= 1898 Trilj earthquake =

Earthquake in modern Croatia

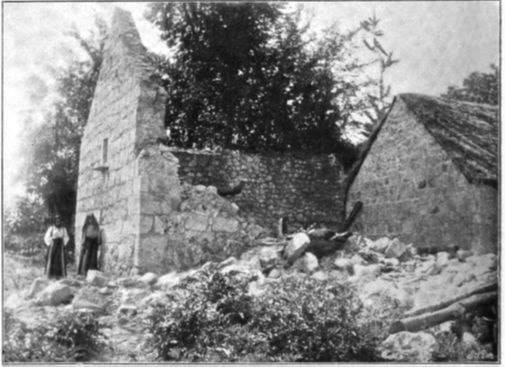

- Location within Croatia
- Local date: July 2, 1898
- Local time: 05:17
- Magnitude: 6.7 M_{w}
- Depth: 10.0 km (6.2 mi)
- Epicenter: 43.62°N 16.73°E
- Areas affected: Trilj, Kingdom of Dalmatia
- Max. intensity: MSK-64 VIII (Damaging) – MSK-64 IX (Destructive)
- Casualties: 6 dead Hundreds injured

The 1898 Trilj earthquake occurred on Saturday, July 2, 1898, near the town of Trilj in the then-Kingdom of Dalmatia, Austria-Hungary, with the moment magnitude of 6.7. The estimated intensity at the epicenter was VIII–IX on the Medvedev–Sponheuer–Karnik scale. It is one of the strongest earthquakes in Croatian history. This is also the first time an earthquake in Croatia were recorded by seismographs at Italian, German, British, Ukrainian, Russian and Slovenian seismic stations.

== Background ==
The region of Dalmatia saw many large earthquake in the last 200 years as it lies on a convergent boundary region between Africa and Eurasia. Regional plate tectonics are complex, and involve the motions of numerous microplates and regional-scale structures. The Adriatic block immediately west of the earthquake is thought to move somewhat independently to Eurasia and Africa, driving surrounding faulting in Italy and along the eastern Adriatic coast from Croatia to Albania.

Several large earthquake occurred in 1925, 1927, and in 1962 in Makarska. The most notable earthquake was back in 1667 in Dubrovnik area which claimed 3,000 lives.

== Damage and casualties ==
The town of Turjaci, Košute, Čaporice, Gardun, Grab, Trilj, Vedrine and Vojnić suffered the most damage. Some houses were completely demolished, and many were damaged. Landslides and cracks in the ground were observed. Churches and schools were damaged. Some wells ran out of water.

Kišpatić (1899) states from the Report of the Presidency of the Dalmatian governments "that in all, 2,365 residential and commercial buildings were damaged, 5 parish houses and 2 churches were destroyed".

The number of victims was much less than expected. It was harvest time so many residents were in the fields at the time of the earthquake. However, three children and three women were killed in Trilj. There were 12 people severely injured in Turjaci, and 20 people in Vojnić were also seriously wounded. In Gardun, Košute, Trilj and Čaporice, half of all houses were destroyed, and over 40 were wounded. About 10,000 people became homeless.

== See also ==
- 1667 Dubrovnik earthquake
- 1962 Makarska earthquake
- List of earthquakes in Croatia
