= List of German exonyms for places in Croatia =

This is a list of German exonyms for places in Croatia.
The entire territory that belongs today to the Republic of Croatia, was governed by Austria-Hungary until 1918, and some Hungarian exonyms became common in German, and have been used interchangeably with the German exonym for a period. These Hungarian names are noted below. Additionally, parts of these territories ruled by Austria-Hungary were formerly governed by the Republic of Venice, the Republic of Ragusa, and the Kingdom of Italy, and Italian names also migrated to German usage; these names are also noted.

Not included are translations of non-proper nouns, names spelled the same, and names respelled to match German pronunciation rules.

== Cities and regions ==
Croatia Kroatien
Croatian place	German name	Notes
Adžamovci	Rittersturn	
Anderturn	Tar	
Andrijaševci	Sankt Andreas	
Anton	Sankt Anton	
Bačevak	Bauk	
Baderna	Mumpadern	Compare Italian Monpaderno
Badljevina	Abtei	
Bakar	Buccari	German uses Italian name
Banjevci	Turn	
Bapska	Bapskau	
Barban	Barben	
Baranja	Branau	
Baška	Weschke	
Baška Voda	Bast	
Bastaji	Bastei	
Benkovac	Bencovazzo	German uses Italian name
Beketinci	Sankt Niklas	
Bektež	Bektess	
Beli	Kaißol	Compare Italian Caisole
Benićanci	Sankt Benedikt	
Benkovac	Sankt Benedikt	
Beram	Burgerdorf	
Beravci	Beresslau	
Beričanci	Gradatz	
Bibalist	Koritna	
Bijela	Bela	
Bijela Stijena	Sankt Maria	
Bijelo Brdo	Wellibardo	
Bilišane	Willigradt	
Biljak	Williak	
Biškupci	Biskupetz	
Bjelanovci	Wellenowatz	
Bjelovar	Belowar	
Bocanjevci	Agminor	
Bogatić	Wogatischen	
Boljun	Vaniol	
Borovik	Borowach	
Borovo	Worow	
Borut	Warut	
Botonega	Woltenegg	
Brest	Bräx	
Brest	Brixel	
Breza	Prisach	
Brežanovci	Brischanowatz	
Brezik	Georgshof	
Breznica	Bresnitz	
Brežnica	Preßnitz	
Brgud	Burgatz	
Bribir	Pribier	
Brnaza	Bernabeck	
Brnobići	Verbonitz	
Brodski Drenovac	Drenowitz	
Brodski Stupnik	Stolpnik	
Brseč	Berschetz	
Brtonigla	Ortenegl	
Budrovci	Sankt Lorenz	
Buk	Buchol	
Bušetina	Buschentz	
Buzet	Pinquent	Compare Italian Pinguente
Cabuna	Sankt Georg	
Čačvina	Zazwin	
Cavtat	Alt Ragus	Compare Italian Ragusavecchia
Čeminac	Laskafeld	
Čepić	Pitsch	
Čepinski Martinci	Sankt Martin	
Cerna	Asorn	
Cerovlje	Zerolach	
Cetina	Zentina	
Ciglenik	Zieglenik	
Čikat	Tschigale	
Cittanova	Neuenburg	
Cremušina	Sirtsch	
Crnac	Arnotz	
Črnotiče	Tschernotisch	
Croatian Littoral	Kroatisches Küstenkand	
Dalj	Dallia	
Dalmatia	Dalmatien	
Daruvar	Darowar	
Dežanovac	Deschanowatz	
Đakovo	Diakowar	
Dioš	Dioschwar	
Dobrinj	Dobrauen	
Dolenj Vas	Niederdorf	
Donj Tučepi	Sankt George in Dalmatien	
Donja Bebrina	Arbei	
Donja Brela	Wrulitz	Once the same city as Gornja Brela
Donja Vrba	Untere Weide	
Donja Vriješka	Sankt Anna	
Donje Vinovo	Wenowitz	
Donji Andrijevci	Sankt Andreas	
Donji Bogićevci	Sagowia	
Donji Gravholjani	Owar	Compare Hungarian Óvár
Donji Muć	Petrois	
Dragović	Dragowitz	
Drenovci	Drenowitz	
Drivenik	Drewenick	
Drniš	Ternisch	
Dubovac Okučanski	Dubowatz	
Dubraja	Kloster	
Dubrave	Paßberg	
Dubronić	Dubrochnitsch	
Dubrovnik	Ragus	Compare Italian Ragusa
Đulovac	Wercke	
Đurđenovac	Sankt Georg	
Đurđenovac	Sankt Georgen	
Đurđevac	Sankt Georgwar	Compare Hungarian Szentgyörgyvár
Đurići	Sankt Georg	
Dvori	Neuenburg	
Erdut	Erdung	
Erešnjevica	Zensorgwartz	
Ernestinovo	Ernestinenhof	
Fažana	Wazan	
Ferovac	Wärwitz	
Filožići	Sankt Niklas	
Forkuševci	Forkuschewitz	
Gabonjin	Boachen	
Gabrovica	Gambrovitz	
Garčin	Garzin	
Glavotok	Sankt Maria	
Golaz	Kartsberg	
Gologorica	Gologoritz	
Golubić	Golubschitsch	
Gorenja Vas	Oberdorf	
Goričac	Gortzetz	
Gorjani	Görrach	
Gornja Brela	Wrulitz	Once the same city as Donja Brela
Gornja Slivnica	Slimwitz	
Gornje Ogorje	Gurbitz	
Gornji Gravholjani	Oberwar	
Goveđe Polje	Ostenitz	
Grab	Grau	
Grabovac	Albertfeld	
Grabovicna	Grabornitz	
Gradac	Gradatsch	
Gradina	Grägen	
Gradinje	Gutteneck	
Gradište	Christburg	
Grdo Selo	Grünenburg	
Grimalda	Grimmelz	
Grobnik	Grobnich	
Grožnjan	Krisingan	Compare Italian Grisignana
Grubišno Polje	Poglack	
Harkanovci	Kawinz	
Hercegovac	Herzogsturn	
Hrastin	Chrastin	
Hrastovac	Eichendorf	
Hrkanovci Đakovački	Hergowitz	
Hrvace	Charwitz	
Hum	Cholm	Compare Italian Colmo
Hum	Gothenburg	
Hvar	Lesina	German uses Italian name
Ičevo	Nietschewo	
Ika	Wichau	
Ilok	Illack	
Imotica	Imotitz	
Imotski	Eimot	
Imotski	Imoschi	German uses Italian name
Istarske Toplice	Niedergrund	
Istria	Istrien	
Ivanovo Polje	Sankt Johann	
Ivanovo Selo	Johannesdorf	
Ivoševci	Zutsch	
Jakšić	Chweimen	
Jarmina	Hermann	
Jesenik	Jassig	
Jezenovik	Jeschenwick	
Jezero	Seedorf	
Josipovac	Ober Josefsdorf	
Josipovac	Sankt Josef	
Jurjevac Punitovački	Sankt Georg	
Kalinovac	Bersewitz	
Kamensko	Kamengröl	
Kamensko	Kaminach	
Kapan	Antonifeld	
Kapelna	Sankt Niklas	
Kaptol	Kapitel	
Karinz	Charinz	
Karlovac	Karlstadt	
Kašćerga	Kastern	
Kastav	Chästau	
Kaštel Žegarski	Schegar	
Klana	Klan	
Klanec	Klainz	
Klenovšćak	Klem	
Klis	Chliss	
Kljake	Klik	
Klokočevac Ilovski	Illau	
Kloštar	Kloster	
Knemca	Knemica	
Knin	Tenin	German uses Italian (Venetian) name
Končanica	Zaokuntsch	
Konjevrate	Kullikwrate	
Kopanica	Kopanitz	
Koprivnica	Kopreinitz	
Korčula	Curzola	German uses Italian name
Koreničani	Unter Stopranitz	
Korog	Koroch	
Korušce	Korisge	
Kosovo	Kosorwitsch	
Kostanjica	Kastan	Compare italian Castagna
Kostrćane	Sankt Maria am See	
Košuti	Kosel	
Kotišina	Kotitschin	
Kožljak	Wachsenstein	
Kraj	Grakau	
Krašica	Krassitz	
Kravice	Krawitz	
Krbune	Korwun	
Kričke	Kraleiss	
Kringa	Kreink	
Križevci	Kreuz	
Krndija	Gordwin	
Krndija	Kerndia	
Kršan	Gartschan	
Kršikla	Karschichl	
Krstolac	Kristolowatz	
Kućice	Zakuitsch	
Kutjevo	Chuteowo	
Kvarner	Kvarner-Bucht	
Labin	Tüberg	
Labinci	Sankt Domenig	Compare Italian Santa Domenica
Lesešćine	Fuchsdorf	
Letaj	Letey	
Lićani	Iltz	
Lindar	Linder	
Lipik	Libegg	
Ljubac	Jubau	
Ljubitovica	Lubustiach	
Ljubotić	Laval	
Ljupina	Lopina	
Loborika	Rowarig	Compare Italian Lavarigo
Lokva	Laqua	
Londžica	Lunza	
Lopur	Lopar	
Lovran	Lauran	Compare Italian Laurana
Lovreč	Sankt Laurentzen	Compare Italian San Lorenzo
Ložane	Loschan	
Lubenice	Lubenitz	
Lupoglav	Mahrenfels	
Makarska	Macharscha	
Male Mune	Munach	German name also refers to Vele Mune
Mali Lošinj	Lussin	German uses Venetian name
Malikovo	Malkowo	
Malinska	Durischal	
Malo Vukovje	Wiewar	Compare Hungarian Újvár
Maovice	Mewe	
Marićanci	Sankt Maria	
Marijanci	Sankt Maria	
Markušica	Sankt Markus	
Maslenica	Fort Sankt Markus	
Medari	Sankt Maria	
Međimurje	Zwischenmurgebiet	
Medvida	Poziach	
Merag	Märag	
Miholjac	Miholtz	
Mikleuš	Sankt Niclas	
Mikluševci	Sankt Niklas	
Mimice	Steingral	
Mirkovci	Sankt Emrich	
Momjan	Momlan	
Mošćenica	Moschkanitz	
Mošćenice	Moschenitz	
Moseč	Mosatsch	
Mrzović	Merschowitz	
Nadin	Nödin	
Našice	Naschitz	
Našička Breznica	Deutsch Bresnitz	
Nin	Fleissenburg	
Njivice	Sniewitz	
Nos Kalik	Zumpogg	
Novalja	Navala	
Novigrad	Stuhlberg	
Novigrad	Wiewar	
Novo Selo	Selniach	
Novo Zvečevo	Papuck	
Očizla	Otschisl	
Okučani	Poktuschan	
Omanovac	Monatz	
Omišalj	Moschau	Compare Italian Castelmuschio
Omošćice	Grimmelzitz	
Opanci	Popon	
Opatija	Sankt Jakobi	Compare Italian San Giacomo al Palo
Opatovac	Sankt Lorenz	
Oprisavci	Sabow	
Oprtalj	Pörzol	Compare Italian Portole
Opuzen	Opus	German uses Venetian name
Orahovice	Rahotscha	
Orebić	Sarabitsch	Compare Italian Sabbioncello
Orešac	Deutsch Oreschatz	
Orubica	Chrusowitz	
Osijek	Esseg(g)	Compare Hungarian Eszék
Oslici	Posshart	
Osor	Opsor	
Ostojićeva	Sankt Niclas	
Ostrovica	Ostrowitz	
Otavice	Ottawitz	
Oton	Hotton	
Pađene	Patzinä	
Padva	Padua	
Paka	Packe	
Pakoštane	Schantpag	
Pakovo Selo	Geiger	
Pakračka Poljana	Poglan	
Pakrani	Pekern	
Pasikovci	Posgawinetz	
Pavlovac	Sankt Paul	
Paz	Passberg	
Pazin	Mitterburg	
Pazinski Novaki	Neusaß	
Perković	Prokowitsch	
Permani	Fern	
Petrijevci	Petrowitz	
Pićan	Piben	
Pinezići	Sankt Foska	Compare Italian Santa Fosca
Pirovac	Slosseln	Compare Italian Slosella
Piškorevci	Pischka	
Pivare	Sankt Maria	
Pivnica	Slawitz	
Plavna	Plaundia	
Plavno	Plaude	
Pleternica	Pleternitz	
Pljak	Lach	
Podborski Batinjani	Heiligenfrauenwald	
Podgaće	Podgatsch	
Podgrad	Neuhaus	
Podgraje	Potgrey	
Podpićan	Perg	
Podravlje	Engersdorf	
Podravske Slatina	Saladnach	
Pogdorac	Pogdoratsch	
Polača	Pölatz	
Poljana	Pollana	
Poreč	Parenz	Compare Italian Parenzo
Porozina	Poresin	
Potnjani	Zambotel	Compare Hungarian Szombathely
Potravlje	Wetteritsch	
Povljana	Poglin	
Požega	Poschegg	
Praproče	Prapotz	
Premantura	Prumentor	Compare Italian Promontore
Pribude	Budag	
Pribudić	Pribodetz	
Pridraga	Pridratzn	
Primošten	Kap-Zesto	
Privlaka	Wrevilack	Compare Italian Brevilacqua
Prokljan	Proklan	
Prvča	Proratz	
Psunj	Pezung	
Pula	Polei	Compare Latin and Italian Pola
Punat	Sankt Maria	
Punta Križa	Krutz	
Račice	Woldenstein	
Radovin	Piegar	
Radinje	Rachlitz	
Rajčići	Blatz	
Rakalj	Rachel	Compare Venetian and Italian Rachele
Rakitovica	Karassitz	
Ramljane	Ramling	
Rašpor	Rasburg	
Rastog	Rastorz	
Ravanjska	Rovanpass	
Raven	Sankt Peter	
Razvode	Razutschey	
Retfala	Rietdorf	
Removac	Neuklisser	
Rijeka	Sankt Veit am Flaum	
Roč	Rotz	Compare Italian Rozzo
Rogalji	Rogolz	
Rogoznica	Klein Kap-Zesto	
Rokovci	Rokotz	Compare Hungarian Rokócz
Rovinj	Ruwein	Compare Istriot Ruveigno
Rože	Sankt Maria in Rose	
Rtina	Artan	
Rudpolje	Rudanowatz	
Salež	Salis	
Šarengrad	Wetterwardein	Compare Hungarian Várad
Satnica Đakovačka	Satnitz	
Sekulinci	Zeglack	
Selci Đakovački	Nissen	
Selci Đakovački	Selze	
Semeljci	Simelzen	
Semiè	Zemitsch	
Senj	Zengg	
Sinj	Zain	
Sesvete	Allerheiligen	
Šibenik	Sebenico	German uses Italian name
Šibenik	Sibenning	Compare Italian Sebenico
Širinci	Ziritz	
Široko Polje	Palin	
Sisak	Sissek	
Šiškovci	Banodel	
Skopljak	Wolfsdorf	
Skradin	Sgraden	
Slatinsky Drenovac	Drenowitz	
Slatnik Drenjski	Slatnick	
Slavonia	Slavonien	
Slavonia	Windischland	
Slavonski Brod	Brod an der Save	
Slavonski Brod	Broth	
Slavonski Šamac	Schamatz	
Slunj	Sluin	
Smilčić	Smeltschitz	
Solin	Salonä	German uses Latin and Italian name
Sonković	Martinosewitz	
Sopje	Sopiä	
Sotin	Zednig	
Sovinjak	Sowinach	
Spačva	Spatzwa	
Špišić Bukovica	Bruchowitz	
Split	Splitt	
Split-Dalmatian	Spalato	German uses Italian name
Stari Mikanovci	Sankt Michael	
Stari Pazin	Niederburg	
Staro Petrovo Selo	Sankt Peter	
Stražanac	Straschanatz	
Strmica	Stermitz am Butzin	
Strošinci	Stroschinze	
Sukošan	Sankt Cassian	Compare Italian San Cassiano
Šumber	Schönberg	
Susek	Zuzech	
Sveti Ivanac	Johannisberg	
Sveti Petar u Šumi	Sankt Peter im Wald	
Syrmia	Syrmien	
Tenja	Tenne	
Tinj	Thin	
Tinjan	Tignan	
Toranj	Thurn	
Tovarnik	Sankt Georg	
Tribounj	Tremau	
Trnava	Darnotz	Compare Hungarian Tarnócz
Trnava	Tirnau	
Trnjani	Tarnian	
Trogir	Traff	Compare Italian Traù
Trviž	Terveis	
Trsat	Tersat	
Tublje	Tublach	
Turanj	Toret	Compare Italian Torrette
Turnašica	Neuturn	
Ugljane	Nurgag	
Umag	Humag	
Umljanović	Zamelin	
Unešić	Motschnau	
Vačani	Wätzan	
Valbiska	Sankt Niklas	
Valpowo	Walpau	
Varaždin	Warasdin	
Vaška	Wascha	
Vele Mune	Munach	German name also refers to Male Mune
Velika	Welick	
Velika Drapčevica	Wiessgrad	
Velika Klisa	Klisser	
Velika Trnovitica	Wellicha	
Velušic	Welisch	
Veprinac	Herberstein	
Vetovo	Sonnberg	
Vinjerac	Kastelwenier	Compare Venetian and Italian name Castelvenier
Vinkovci	Winkowitz	
Virovitica	Weretz	
Viškovci	Wischkowitz	
Visoka	Wissak	
Visoka Greda	Wizeky	
Vižinada	Visinat	
Vlašići	Walassigy	
Voćin	Vussin	
Vodice	Woditz	
Vodice	Wotzisberg	
Volosko	Volosca	German uses Italian name
Vrana	Weranien	
Vranja	Goldsburg	
Vrbica	Werbitz	
Vrbnik	Verbnick	
Vrbnik	Vörbnick	
Vrdovo	Weredel	
Vrgorac	Wergoratz	
Vrh	Berg	
Vrpolje	Wratschipogle	
Vrsar	Orser	Compare Italian Orsera
Vučevci	Wolfstal	
Vučjak Kamenečki	Weltschak	
Vučkovac	Wochovitz	
Vujašinovići	Kudentin	
Vukovar	Walkowar	
Vukovije	Wiwar	
Zadar	Zara	German uses Italian name
Zadubravlje	Dobrowein	
Zagvozd	Zagold	
Zagreb	Agram	
Zagreb-Adamovec	Agram-Klosterowitz	
Zagreb-Breštje	Agram-Fischerheim	
Zagreb-Đurđekovec	Agram-Sankt Georg	
Zagreb-Dubrava	Agram-Dombrau	
Zagreb-Horvati	Agram-Korwat	
Zagreb-Lipnica	Agram-Lipnitz	
Zagreb-Markuševac	Agram-Sankt Markus	
Zagreb-Mihaljevac	Agram-Michalowitz	
Zagreb-Moravče	Agram-Morautscha	
Zagreb-Podsused	Agram-Sosel	
Zagreb-Sesvete	Agram-Allerheiligen	
Zamaško	Zamasch	
Zapuntel	Sankt Michael	
Zaton	Zackon	
Završje	Permund	Compare Italian Piemonte
Zdenj	Zdentsch	
Zečevo	Schezewo	
Zelengrad	Schellengradt	
Zelovo Sustinsko	Sustin	
Zemunik	Schemunig	
Žrenj	Strengen	
Zmijacvi	Simitz	
Žminj	Gimino	German uses Italian name
Žminj	Schwing	
Žrmanija	Deutschendorf	
Žrnovica	Zernowitz	
Žumberak	Sichelberg	
Županja	Schaupanie	
Zvoneće	Subnach	

== Natural locations ==
Croatia Kroatien
English name	German name	Croatian place	Type	Notes
Brač	Bratz	Brač	Island	Compare Italian Brazza
Brijuni	Brioni Inselgruppe	Brijuni	Island	German uses the Italian name
Cres	Kersch	Cres	Island	Compare Italian Cherso
Danube	Donau	Dunav	River	
Drava	Drau	Drava	Island	
Hvar	Phar	Hvar	Island	
Ilovik	Nebe	Ilovik	Island	
Ist	Gist	Ist	Island	
Iž	Ese	Iž	Island	Compare Italian Eso
Korčula	Curzola	Korčula	Island	German uses the Italian name
Krk	Vegl	Krk	Island	Compare Italian Veglia
Kupa	Kulpa	Kupa	River	
Lastovo	Augusta	Lastovo	Island	Compare Italian Lagosta
Lošinj	Lötzing	Lošinj	Island	
Maun	Maoni	Maun	Island	German uses Italian name
Mljet	Melide	Mljet	Island	Compare Italian Meleda
Molat	Melade	Molat	Island	Compare Italian Melada
Mur	Mur	Mura	River	
Murter	Mörter	Murter	Island	German uses Venetian and Italian name
Neretva	Narenta	Neretva	River	German uses the Italian name
Olib	Lüb	Olib	Island	
Pag	Baag	Pag	Island	
Pašman	Pasmann	Pašman	Island	
Plavnik	Plaun	Plavnik	Island	
Premuda	Permud	Premuda	Island	
Prvić	Prewig	Prvić	Island	
Rab	Arbey	Rab	Island	Compare Italian Arbe
Sava	Sau	Sava	River	
Sava	Save	Sava	River	
Silba	Silva	Silba	Island	
Susak	Sansig	Susak	Island	Compare Italian Sansego
Ugljan	Uglan	Ugljan	Island	
Unije	Niä	Unije	Island	
Vele Srakane	Kanidol	Vele Srakane	Island	Compare Italian Canidole
Vir	Pontadür	Vir	Island	Compare Italian Puntadura
Vis	Lissa	Vis	Island	German uses Italian name
Žirje	Jassur	Žirje	Island	
Žut	Zuitsch	Žut	Island	
