= Fort Nutjak =

Coordinates: 43.5938°N 16.7155°E

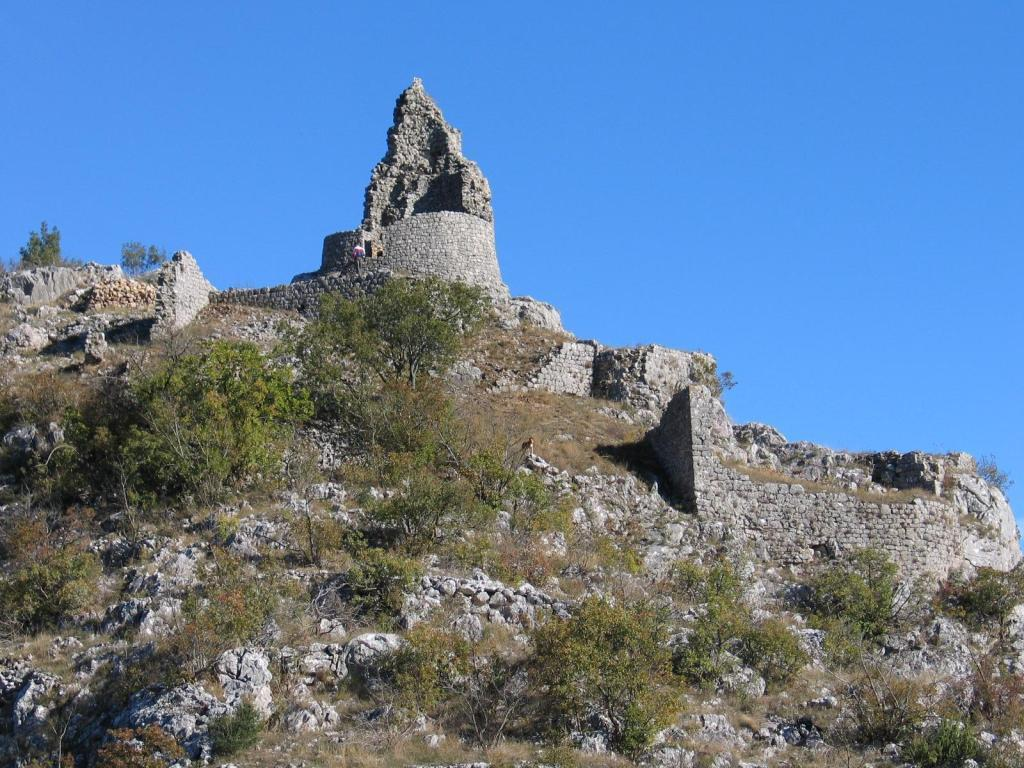
Ruins of Fort Nutjak

Fort Nutjak is a late medieval fortress overlooking the canyon of the Cetina River, about 3 km downstream from the town of Trilj, Croatia, where the river leaves the plateau of Sinjsko Polje and continues its winding path through the canyon to the confluence in Omiš. It was built in the 15th century to protect the land west of the Cetina from Ottoman invasion, most likely by order of duke of Republic of Poljica Žarko Dražojević. Even though he offered it for sale to Venice in 1499, 1502, and 1504, he apparently retained possession until his death in 1508. Sometime before 1513 it was conquered by the Ottomans. The people of Poljica regained control in March 1685, at the start of the Morean War. In 1699, Nutjak was assigned to Venice by the Treaty of Karlowitz and the opposite shore of the Cetina, together with Fort Čačvina, remained under Turkish rule. Venetian sources mention that the Ottomans stationed a garrison of twenty to thirty lightly armed soldiers, which was governed by a dizdar, and fell under the Sanjak of Klis and was subordinate to the kadi of Imotski. Soon, the fort lost its strategic role because a small Venetian fort, the so-called Guardia, was erected at nearby Gardun. The Fort Nutjak's defensive role diminished after the Ottoman expulsion from Imotski in 1717, during the Second Morean War, and by the early 20th century the fortress was in ruins.

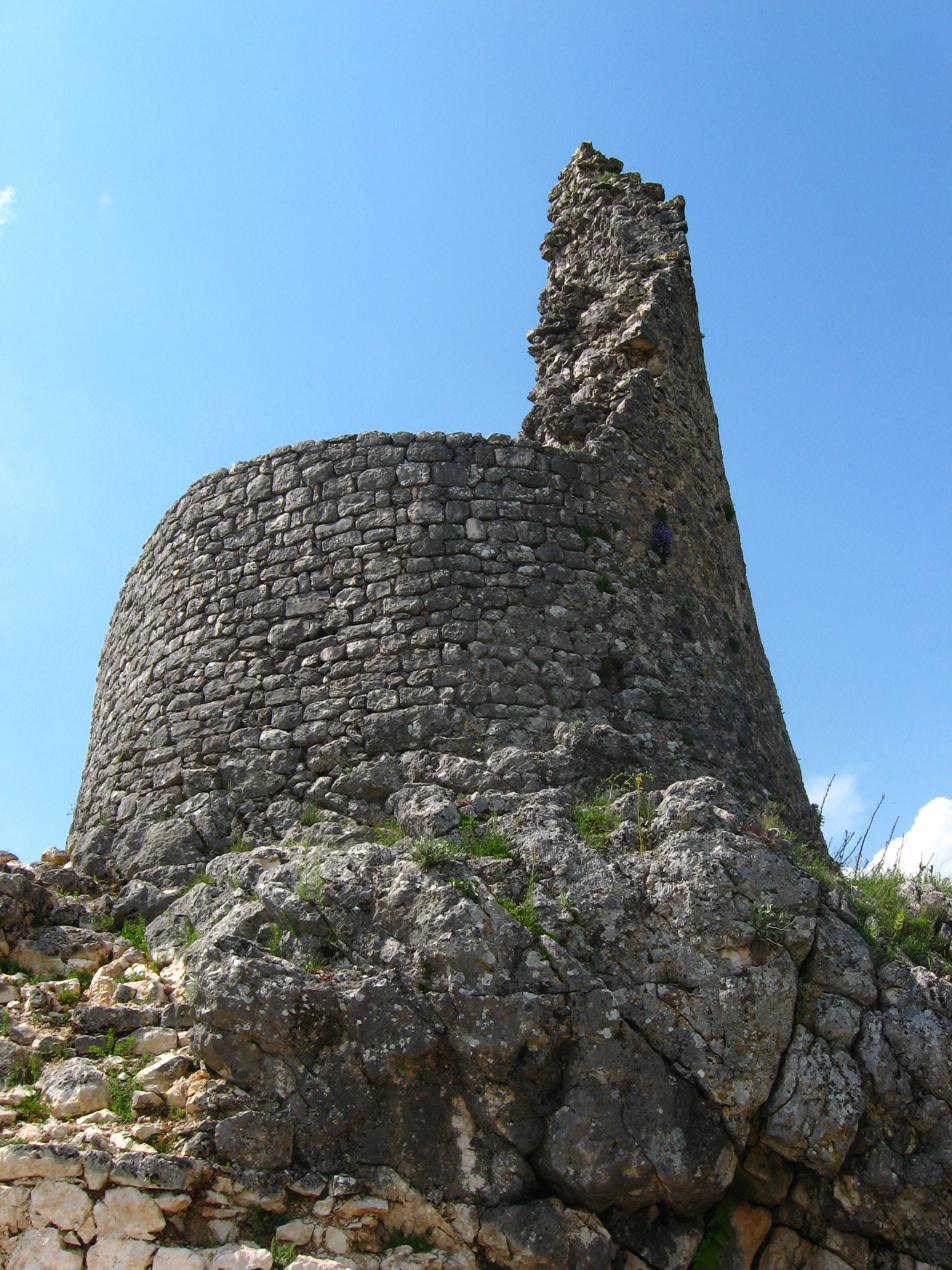
Tower

The complex is dominated by a large circular tower, built of partially processed stone blocks bound with plaster, with a filling of smaller stone. On the west, the main entrance to the fortress is partially preserved in a length of about 7 m and a height of 4 m. There is a small courtyard inside the fortress, and a number of buildings and rooms, with irregular floor plan.

The importance of the Nutjak fortress is evidenced by the fact that Pope Innocent VIII decided to finance its maintenance in 1492, the year of his death. According to archaeological research, the fortress appears to have been built on a prehistoric site.

The first known description and sketch of the fortress were made in 1688 by Venetian cartographer V. M. Coronelli.

The fort is protected as an immovable cultural property of Croatia. It can be reached via a path that branches off from the Trilj–Bisko road at the fourth kilometer.

== See also ==
- Fort Čačvina
