= List of earthquakes in Croatia =

Epicentres of major earthquakes in Croatia with year of occurrence since 1900

This is a list of significant earthquakes that either had their epicentres in Croatia or had a significant impact in the country.

This incomplete list of earthquakes in Croatia includes major earthquakes with epicenters within the country's current borders, as well as earthquakes that had a significant impact within Croatia.

There was no systematic gathering of earthquake data in Croatia before the 19th century. The magnitudes and epicenters of earlier earthquakes cannot be reliably determined, although some estimates exist.

Following the 1963 Skopje earthquake, Yugoslavia (which Croatia was a part of) implemented its first Code for Construction in Seismic Regions in 1964.

== Earthquakes ==
Date	Epicenter	Mag.	Intensity	Deaths	Injuries	Notes
26 March 1502	Medvednica		VIII			The earliest recorded earthquake in Zagreb; destroyed the tower of the St. Mark's Church.
26 March 1511	Slovenia		X			Intensity of MCS VII in Rijeka and VI in Zagreb. Severely damaged the Zagreb Cathedral. See 1511 Idrija earthquake
28 July 1516	Dubrovnik		IX			
15 September 1590	Austria		VII–IX			Damaged the fortified town of Medvedgrad. See 1590 Neulengbach earthquake
6 April 1667	Dubrovnik		IX–X	3,000–5,000		See 1667 Dubrovnik earthquake
11 February 1699	Slovenia					Destroyed the fortified towns of Veliki Kalnik and Medvedgrad, as well as the tower of the St. Mark's Church in Zagreb.
28 November 1750	Rijeka					Series of earthquakes lasting from 28 November to 17 December destroyed the Rijeka City Tower and the Trsat Castle, damaged numerous churches, and caused pollution of local wells in Rijeka and its surroundings. Many residents were rendered homeless. The rebuilding efforts, which began in 1753, transformed the city. See 1750 Rijeka earthquake
9 November 1880	Medvednica	6.3	VIII	1	29	See 1880 Zagreb earthquake
2 July 1898	Sinj, Trilj	6.7	IX	6	Hundreds	See 1898 Trilj earthquake
17 December 1905	Kašina		VIII			Significant damage in Zagreb.
2 January 1906	Kašina	5.8	VIII			Significant damage in Zagreb.
8 October 1909	Pokupsko	6.0	VIII			Pokupsko earthquake was extensively studied by Andrija Mohorovičić, which led him to discover the Mohorovičić discontinuity.
12 March 1916	Novi Vinodolski	5.9				Major damage.
29 January 1917	Rude, Zagreb County	5.8				Significant damage in Zagreb.
30 May 1925	Knin	c. 6.2				
20 July 1927	Jelsa	c. 6.2				
27 March 1938	Bilogora	5.9				See 1938 Bilogora earthquake.
29 December 1942	Imotski	6.2	IX	20+		More than 20 people dead.
7 January 1962	Podgora	6.2	VII	4		Four people died. See 1962 Makarska earthquakes
11 January 1962	Makarska	6.1	IX	2		Two people killed. See 1962 Makarska earthquakes
13 April 1964	Dilj, Slavonski Brod	6.0	VII	3		Over 5,000 houses destroyed or damaged, three people were killed. See 1964 Dilj earthquake
15 April 1979	Montenegro	7.0	X			Widespread damage in south-east Croatia; more than 1,000 buildings damaged in Dubrovnik alone. See 1979 Montenegro earthquake
16 March 1982	Novi Marof	4.5	VIII			Damage to cultural heritage in the Hrvatsko Zagorje area exceeded 1.38 billion Yugoslav dinars.
27 November 1990	Dinara	5.6	VII			Ten people injured, landslides affected rail transport.
25 August 1995	Požega	4.9	V			Minor damage in the city centre.
5 September 1996	Ston	6.0	VIII		Several	350 buildings destroyed or rendered unsafe. See 1996 Ston–Slano earthquake
23 May 2004	Imotski-Grude	5.0	VI-VII			Minor damage reported in several villages.
22 March 2020	Zagreb	5.5	VII	2	26	See 2020 Zagreb earthquake
29 December 2020	Petrinja	6.4	IX	9	26	See 2020 Petrinja earthquake
Note: The inclusion criteria for adding events are based on WikiProject Earthquakes' notability guideline that was developed for stand alone articles. The principles described also apply to lists. In summary, only damaging, injurious, or deadly events should be recorded.

== See also ==
- List of earthquakes in Italy
- List of earthquakes in Slovenia
- List of earthquakes in Bosnia and Herzegovina
- List of earthquakes in Albania

== Bibliography ==
- Atalić, Josip; Šavor Novak, Marta; Uroš, Mario (2019). "Seismic risk for Croatia: overview of research activities and present assessments with guidelines for the future". Građevinar. 71 (10). Zagreb: Croatian association of civil engineers: 923–947. doi:10.14256/JCE.2732.2019. ISSN 1333-9095.
- Nola, Iskra Alexandra; Doko Jelinić, Jagoda; Žuškin, Eugenija; Kratohvil, Mladen (2013). "Potresi – povijesni pregled, okolišni i zdravstveni učinci i mjere zdravstvene skrbi" [Earthquakes – A Historical Review, Environmental and Health Effects, and Health Care Measures]. Archives of Industrial Hygiene and Toxicology (in Croatian). 64 (2). Zagreb: Institute for Medical Research and Occupational Health: 327–336. doi:10.2478/10004-1254-64-2013-2304. ISSN 1848-6312. PMID 23819942.
- Simović, Veselin (2000). "Potresi na zagrebačkom području" [Earthquakes in Zagreb area]. Građevinar (in Croatian). 52 (11). Zagreb: Croatian association of civil engineers: 637–645. ISSN 1333-9095.
- Škreb, Stjepan (1929). "Zagrebački potresi" [Zagreb's earthquakes]. Narodna starina (in Croatian). 8 (20). Croatian State Archives: 209–211. ISSN 1849-1529.
- Herak, Davorka; Herak, Marijan (2012). "Seizmičnost i potresna opasnost na makarskom području" (PDF). In Mustapić, Marko; Hrstić, Ivan (eds.). Makarsko primorje danas. Makarsko primorje od kraja Drugog svjetskog rata do 2011 [Makarska Littoral today. Makarska Littoral from the end of World War II to 2011]. Biblioteka Zbornici (in Croatian). Vol. 40. Zagreb: Institut društvenih znanosti Ivo Pilar. pp. 267–276. ISBN 978-953-6666-87-4.
- Jurukovski, Dimitar; Gavrilović, Predrag (1994). "(Former) Yugoslavia". In Paz, Mario (ed.). International Handbook of Earthquake Engineering. Boston, MA: Springer. pp. 528–535. doi:10.1007/978-1-4615-2069-6_38. ISBN 978-1-4613-5859-6.
