= Vinine =

Vinine may refer to:

- Vinine, Neum, a village in Bosnia and Herzegovina
- Vinine, Croatia, a village near Trilj
