= Budimiri =

Settlement in Split-Dalmatia County, Croatia

- Settlement
- Interactive map of Budimiri
- Location within Croatia
- Coordinates: 43°34′08″N 16°48′58″E
- Country: Croatia
- County: Split-Dalmatia
- City: Trilj

Area
  - Total: 11.4 km^{2} (4.4 sq mi)

Population (2021)
  - Total: 69
  - Density: 6.1/km^{2} (16/sq mi)
- Time zone: UTC+1 (CET)
  - Summer (DST): UTC+2 (CEST)
- Postal code: 21240 Trilj
- Area code: +385 (0)21

Budimiri is a settlement in the City of Trilj in Croatia. In 2021, its population was 69.

== Demographics ==
Budimiri: Population trends 1857–2021
v

population	505	556	561	341	543	458	723	573	541	574	566	480	336	236	149	106	69
	1857	1869	1880	1890	1900	1910	1921	1931	1948	1953	1961	1971	1981	1991	2001	2011	2021

Note:From 1857 to 1880 and in 1921, this contains data for the settlement of Vinine. Sources: Croatian Bureau of Statistics publications
