= Vrabac =

Vrabac (sparrow) may refer to:

- Vrabac (surname)
- Vrabac (bus), an electric minibus line in Belgrade, Serbia
- Šoštarić Vrabac, Yugoslav primary glider
- Vrabac, Serbian reconnaissance drone
- Vrabač, a village in Croatia
