= List of earthquakes in 1962 =

Earthquakes in 1962
Approximate epicenters of the earthquakes in 1962
- 4.0–5.9 magnitude
- 6.0–6.9 magnitude
- 7.0–7.9 magnitude
- 8.0+ magnitude
- Strongest: United Kingdom, Fiji (Magnitude 7.5) May 21
- Deadliest: Iran Qazvin Province, Iran (Magnitude 7.0) September 1 12,225 deaths
- Total fatalities: 12,332

Number by magnitude
- 9.0+: 0

This is a list of earthquakes in 1962. Only magnitude 6.0 or greater earthquakes appear on the list. Lower magnitude events are included if they have caused death, injury or damage. Events which occurred in remote areas will be excluded from the list as they wouldn't have generated significant media interest. All dates are listed according to UTC time. Maximum intensities are indicated on the Mercalli intensity scale and are sourced from United States Geological Survey (USGS) ShakeMap data. The year was characterized by fairly moderate activity. The largest of 10 magnitude 7.0 + earthquakes measured 7.5 and struck Fiji. Iran had the deadliest event with over 12,000 deaths in September. Apart from this there was few other deaths from earthquakes. Colombia had the most with 47 in July.

== Overall ==
=== By death toll ===
Rank	Death toll	Magnitude	Location	MMI	Depth (km)	Date
1	12,225	7.0	Iran, Qazvin Province	IX (Violent)	15.0	September 1
2	47	6.5	Colombia, Choco Department	VI (Strong)	64.0	July 30
3	16	6.2	Italy, Campania	VI (Strong)	20.0	August 21
4	15	6.1	Albania, Fier County	VII (Very strong)	26.4	March 18

- Note: At least 10 casualties

=== By magnitude ===
Rank	Magnitude	Death toll	Location	MMI	Depth (km)	Date
1	7.5	0	United Kingdom, Fiji	I (Not felt)	390.0	May 21
= 2	7.3	0	northern Mid-Atlantic Ridge	I (Not felt)	10.0	March 17
= 2	7.3	0	Japan, off the east coast of Honshu	VI (Strong)	28.0	April 12
= 3	7.2	0	Panama, south of	VII (Very strong)	25.0	July 26
= 3	7.2	0	Argentina, Santiago del Estero Province	I (Not felt)	588.7	December 9
= 4	7.1	0	Chile, Araucania Region	IX (Violent)	30.0	February 14
= 4	7.1	0	Japan, off the east coast of Hokkaido	VII (Very strong)	60.0	April 23
= 4	7.1	0	Indonesia, Barat Daya Islands	VII (Very strong)	30.2	May 15
= 5	7.0	4	Mexico, Guerrero	VIII (Severe)	25.0	May 11
= 5	7.0	12,225	Iran, Qazvin Province	IX (Violent)	15.0	September 1

- Note: At least 7.0 magnitude

== Notable events ==
=== January ===
January
- Strongest: 6.5 M_{w} Dominican Republic
- Deadliest: 6.2 M_{w} Yugoslavia; 4 deaths
- Total fatalities: 5

Number by magnitude
- 8.0–8.9: 0
- 7.0–7.9: 0
- 6.0–6.9: 8

Date	Country and location	M_{w}	Depth (km)	MMI	Notes	Casualties	
Date	Country and location	M_{w}	Depth (km)	MMI	Notes	Dead	Injured
4	Japan, off the south coast of Honshu	6.2	50.0	VI			
5	Indonesia, off the west coast of Sumatra	6.0	30.1				
7	Yugoslavia, Dalmatia, Croatia	6.2	15.0	VIII	In the first of the 1962 Makarska earthquakes, 4 people were killed and some damage was caused. A few days later another event struck in an example of a doublet earthquake.	4	
8	Dominican Republic, Peravia Province	6.5	35.6	VII			
9	Japan, off the southeast coast of Hokkaido	6.0	49.0	V			
11	Yugoslavia, Dalmatia, Croatia	6.2	15.0	IX	In the second of the 1962 Makarska earthquakes, 2 people died and 2,290 homes collapsed.	1	
25	United Kingdom, Makira, Solomon Islands	6.0	45.0				
26	Greece, southwest of Crete	6.0	25.0				

=== February ===
February
- Strongest: 7.1 M_{w} Chile
- Total fatalities: 0

Number by magnitude
- 8.0–8.9: 0
- 7.0–7.9: 1
- 6.0–6.9: 4

Date	Country and location	M_{w}	Depth (km)	MMI	Notes	Casualties	
Date	Country and location	M_{w}	Depth (km)	MMI	Notes	Dead	Injured
3	Indonesia, off the north coast of Papua (province)	6.3	23.0	VI			
14	Chile, Araucania Region	7.1	30.0	IX	Some damage was caused.		
20	Japan, off the southeast coast of Hokkaido	6.1	50.7	V			
20	Burma, Kachin State	6.3	35.0	VI			
27	Chile, Bio-Bio Region	6.2	25.0	VI			

=== March ===
March
- Strongest: 7.3 M_{w} northern Mid-Atlantic Ridge
- Deadliest: 6.1 M_{w} Albania; 15 deaths
- Total fatalities: 16

Number by magnitude
- 8.0–8.9: 0
- 7.0–7.9: 1
- 6.0–6.9: 10

Date	Country and location	M_{w}	Depth (km)	MMI	Notes	Casualties	
Date	Country and location	M_{w}	Depth (km)	MMI	Notes	Dead	Injured
7	United States, Northern Mariana Islands	6.9	635.0				
11	Philippines, east of Mindanao	6.3	44.6	V			
12	Panama, south of	6.5	25.0	VII	Some damage was caused.		
17	northern Mid-Atlantic Ridge	7.3	10.0				
18	New Hebrides, Vanuatu	6.0	15.0	VI			
18	Albania, Fier County	6.1	26.4	VII	15 people were killed and some damage was caused.	15	
18	China, Guangdong Province	6.0	15.0	VIII	1 person was killed and another 2 were injured. 1,200 homes were destroyed.	1	2
19	Indonesia, Gulf of Tomini	6.0	145.3				
22	Australia, off the north coast of Papua and New Guinea	6.4	35.0	VIII			
24	Australia, Madang Province, Papua and New Guinea	6.0	117.8				
26	Chile, off the coast of Los Lagos Region	6.2	30.9	VI			

=== April ===
April
- Strongest: 7.3 M_{w} Japan
- Deadliest: 6.4 M_{w} Peru; 9 deaths
- Total fatalities: 15

Number by magnitude
- 8.0–8.9: 0
- 7.0–7.9: 2
- 6.0–6.9: 6
- 5.0–5.9: 1

Date	Country and location	M_{w}	Depth (km)	MMI	Notes	Casualties	
Date	Country and location	M_{w}	Depth (km)	MMI	Notes	Dead	Injured
1	Iran, South Khorasan Province	5.8	15.0	VII	5 people were killed and some damage was reported.	5	
10	Greece, Ionian Sea	6.2	15.0	V			
12	Japan, off the east coast of Honshu	7.3	28.0	VI			
18	Peru, off the coast of northern	6.4	49.4	V	9 people were killed and some damage was caused.	9	
19	Soviet Union, Sakha Republic, Russia	6.0	15.0				
20	Haiti, north of	6.6	25.0	VI			
23	China, Yunnan Province	6.0	0.0	VII	Some damage was caused. Unknown depth.		
23	Japan, off the east coast of Hokkaido	7.1	60.0	VII			
30	Japan, Miyagi Prefecture, Honshu	6.1	15.0	VII	1 person was killed and at least 101 were injured. Some damage was caused.	1	101+

=== May ===
May
- Strongest: 7.5 M_{w} United Kingdom
- Deadliest: 7.0 M_{w} Mexico; 4 deaths
- Total fatalities: 7

Number by magnitude
- 8.0–8.9: 0
- 7.0–7.9: 3
- 6.0–6.9: 7

Date	Country and location	M_{w}	Depth (km)	MMI	Notes	Casualties	
Date	Country and location	M_{w}	Depth (km)	MMI	Notes	Dead	Injured
7	Soviet Union, Kuril Islands, Russia	6.5	25.0	VI			
10	New Zealand, West Coast, New Zealand	6.0	25.0	VI			
11	Mexico, Guerrero	7.0	25.0	VIII	4 people were killed and at least 101 were injured. Some homes were destroyed.	4	101+
15	Indonesia, Barat Daya Islands	7.1	30.2	VII			
19	Mexico, Guerrero	6.8	25.0	VII	Large aftershock of previous event from May 11. 3 people were killed and 16 were injured in this event. Some homes collapsed.	3	16
21	China, northern Qinghai Province	6.6	17.0	VIII	A few homes were damaged or destroyed.		
21	United Kingdom, Fiji	7.5	390.0				
22	United Kingdom, Santa Cruz Islands, Solomon Islands	6.6	114.4				
22	Australia, East New Britain Province, Papua and New Guinea	6.1	15.0	VI			
31	Japan, Volcano Islands	6.6	269.1				

=== June ===
June
- Strongest: 6.5 M_{w} Japan
- Total fatalities: 0

Number by magnitude
- 8.0–8.9: 0
- 7.0–7.9: 0
- 6.0–6.9: 4
- 5.0–5.9: 1

Date	Country and location	M_{w}	Depth (km)	MMI	Notes	Casualties	
Date	Country and location	M_{w}	Depth (km)	MMI	Notes	Dead	Injured
11	Yugoslavia, Republika Srpska, Bosnia and Herzegovina	5.9	15.0	VII	Major property damage was caused with costs being $40 million (1962 rate).		
23	Japan, Ryukyu Islands	6.5	23.0				
24	China, Yunnan Province	6.0	15.0	VII	2,550 homes were destroyed.		
25	Taiwan, east of	6.4	35.0	V			
28	United States, Hawaii (island), Hawaii	6.2	8.9	VI			

=== July ===
July
- Strongest: 7.2 M_{w} Panama
- Deadliest: 6.5 M_{w} Colombia; 47 deaths
- Total fatalities: 47

Number by magnitude
- 8.0–8.9: 0
- 7.0–7.9: 1
- 6.0–6.9: 6

Date	Country and location	M_{w}	Depth (km)	MMI	Notes	Casualties	
Date	Country and location	M_{w}	Depth (km)	MMI	Notes	Dead	Injured
2	United Kingdom, Santa Cruz Islands, Solomon Islands	6.2	104.3				
6	Afghanistan, Badakhshan Province	6.7	216.2	IV			
17	Japan, off the east coast of Hokkaido	6.0	49.9	V			
25	United Kingdom, south of Cayman Islands	6.1	20.0				
26	Panama, south of	7.2	25.0	VII	Some damage was caused.		
30	Australia, off the north coast of Papua and New Guinea	6.6	25.0	VII			
30	Colombia, Choco Department	6.5	64.0	VI	47 people were killed and 300 were injured. Major damage was caused.	47	300

=== August ===
August
- Strongest: 6.8 M_{w} Chile
- Deadliest: 6.2 M_{w} Italy; 16 deaths
- Total fatalities: 17

Number by magnitude
- 8.0–8.9: 0
- 7.0–7.9: 0
- 6.0–6.9: 8
- 5.0–5.9: 1

Date	Country and location	M_{w}	Depth (km)	MMI	Notes	Casualties	
Date	Country and location	M_{w}	Depth (km)	MMI	Notes	Dead	Injured
1	Australia, off the north coast of Papua and New Guinea	6.3	25.0	VII			
3	Chile, Antofagasta Region	6.8	124.8	VII			
11	Taiwan, northeast of	6.5	128.8	V			
17	Philippines, southwest of Panay	6.0	20.0	V			
19	China, northern Xinjiang Province	6.3	33.2	VIII	Some homes were destroyed.		
21	Italy, Campania	6.2	20.0	VI	The 1962 Irpinia earthquake killed at least 16 people and caused damage.	16	
26	Japan, off the south coast of Honshu	6.0	15.0	VI			
28	Greece, Peloponnese (region)	6.1	110.2		1 person was killed and some damage was caused.	1	
30	United States, northern Utah	5.9	10.0	VII	Some damage was caused in the 1962 Cache Valley earthquake. Damage costs were $1 million (1962 rate).		

=== September ===
September
- Strongest: 7.0 M_{w} Iran
- Deadliest: 7.0 M_{w} Iran; 12,225 deaths
- Total fatalities: 12,225

Number by magnitude
- 8.0–8.9: 0
- 7.0–7.9: 1
- 6.0–6.9: 6

Date	Country and location	M_{w}	Depth (km)	MMI	Notes	Casualties	
Date	Country and location	M_{w}	Depth (km)	MMI	Notes	Dead	Injured
1	Iran, Qazvin Province	7.0	15.0	IX	The 1962 Buin Zahra earthquake left 12,225 people dead and another 2,776 injured. Major property damage was caused with costs of $30 million (1962 rate). 21,310 homes were destroyed.	12,225	2,776
10	United Kingdom, Fiji	6.5	630.6				
12	Afghanistan, Baghlan Province	6.3	35.0	VI			
18	Panama, south of	6.8	30.0	V			
22	Burma, Kachin State	6.1	25.0	VI			
24	Japan, southeast of Hokkaido	6.0	30.0	IV			
29	Argentina, Santiago del Estero Province	6.4	573.0				

=== October ===
October
- Strongest: 6.5 M_{w} Taiwan
- Total fatalities: 0

Number by magnitude
- 8.0–8.9: 0
- 7.0–7.9: 0
- 6.0–6.9: 4

Date	Country and location	M_{w}	Depth (km)	MMI	Notes	Casualties	
Date	Country and location	M_{w}	Depth (km)	MMI	Notes	Dead	Injured
6	New Hebrides, Vanuatu	6.3	60.0				
6	New Hebrides, Vanuatu	6.0	35.0	V	Aftershock.		
6	New Hebrides, Vanuatu	6.0	35.0	V	Aftershock.		
8	Taiwan, off the east coast of	6.5	35.0	VI			

=== November ===
November
- Strongest: 6.2 M_{w} 2 events
- Total fatalities: 0

Number by magnitude
- 8.0–8.9: 0
- 7.0–7.9: 0
- 6.0–6.9: 2
- 5.0–5.9: 1

Date	Country and location	M_{w}	Depth (km)	MMI	Notes	Casualties	
Date	Country and location	M_{w}	Depth (km)	MMI	Notes	Dead	Injured
6	Iran, Hormozgan Province	5.7	15.0	VI	Some damage was caused.		
16	India, Andaman Islands	6.2	27.0	VII			
29	New Hebrides, Vanuatu	6.2	35.0	VI			

=== December ===
December
- Strongest: 7.2 M_{w} Argentina
- Total fatalities: 0

Number by magnitude
- 8.0–8.9: 0
- 7.0–7.9: 1
- 6.0–6.9: 8
- 5.0–5.9: 1

Date	Country and location	M_{w}	Depth (km)	MMI	Notes	Casualties	
Date	Country and location	M_{w}	Depth (km)	MMI	Notes	Dead	Injured
7	Japan, west of the Izu Islands	6.6	431.2				
8	Tonga	6.2	39.4				
9	Argentina, Santiago del Estero Province	7.2	588.7				
17	China, Ningxia Province	5.7	20.0	VII	A few homes collapsed.		
21	Indonesia, south of Java	6.2	55.0				
21	United States, Fox Islands (Alaska)	6.4	20.6		Series.		
21	United States, Fox Islands (Alaska)	6.5	25.0		Series.		
22	United States, Fox Islands (Alaska)	6.5	33.3		Series.		
26	Soviet Union, Commander Islands, Russia	6.7	22.8				
29	Chile, Tarapaca Region	6.2	50.0	VI			
