= Tilurium =

Illyrian fortified settlement of the Delmatae

Coordinates: 43.6114°N 16.7157°E

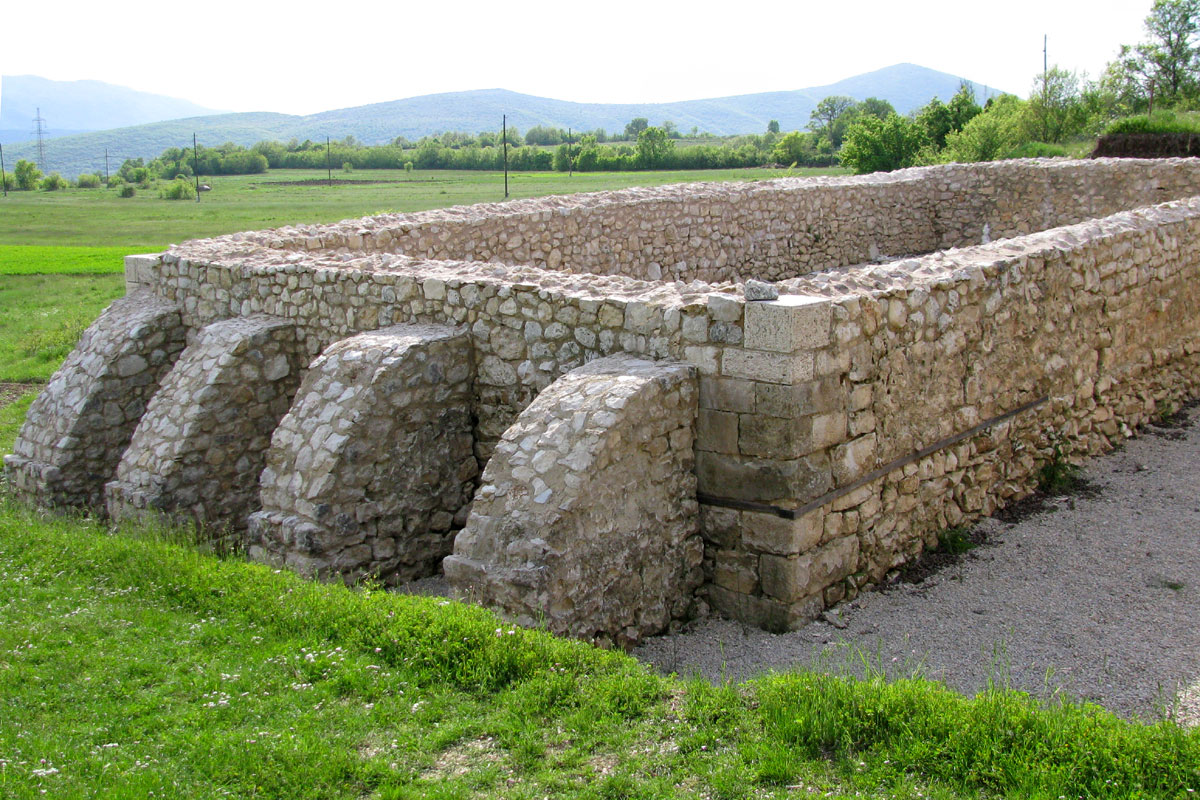
Roman Military Barracks

Tilurium was an ancient settlement and military site located at Gardun above the modern town of Trilj in Croatia. Originally an Illyrian hill-fort of the Delmatae tribe, it later became a major Roman legionary fortress and continued as a fortified post into Late Antiquity. Tilurium occupied a plateau on the northeast side of the Cetina River (ancient Hippos), strategically commanding the river crossing known as Pons Tiluri, the Tilurium Bridge. The site covered approximately 12 hectares, and the modern village of Gardun sits over its remains.

The camp was a key military centre in Dalmatia. At first, the 9th Hispanic legion (Legio IX Hispana) was stationed there, then the 7th Roman legion (Legio VII Claudia Pia Fidelis). At this location, workshops specialized in stone masonry crafted tombstones and other monuments for the 7th legion.

== History ==
=== Pre-Roman ===
Tilurium's origins lie with the Delmatae, an Illyrian tribe of the Dalmatian hinterland. Prior to the Roman conquest, the Delmatae built fortified hilltop enclosures (oppida) of which Tilurium was one. Such Illyrian fortifications were typically oval or circular and served as tribal centres or refuges in times of conflict. The region around Tilurium often saw warfare, both intertribal and against Roman incursions, during the late pre-Roman era. In 6–9 AD, the Great Illyrian Revolt (Bellum Batonianum) shook the province; one of the final phases of this rebellion took place between Burnum and Tilurium, underscoring the strategic importance of the Tilurium area in resisting Rome. The Roman victory in 9 AD marked the end of organised Illyrian resistance and paved the way for a permanent Roman military presence at Tilurium.

=== Roman Era ===
Legio IX Hispana was initially stationed here. After the suppression of the Delmatae in 9 AD, the Romans integrated Tilurium into their frontier defense network. A permanent legionary fortress (castrum) was established on the Gardun plateau, using the site's commanding view of the Cetina valley and the vital river crossing.

In the early 1st century AD the Roman legion Legio VII Claudia arrived from Macedonia during or soon after the Illyrian revolt and built up the fortress's defenses. The tropaion (victory monument) dates to the early Imperial era (after 9 AD). Tilurium served as the legion's base for several decades and became one of the most important military hubs in the region, guarding inland routes to the heart of Dalmatia and linking to the provincial capital Salona via a network of Roman roads.

By the mid-1st century AD as the province stabilised, Rome redeployed its legions. Around 45-58 AD, Legio VII Claudia was withdrawn from Tilurium and sent to Viminacium, Moesia. Veterans of the Seventh Legion were granted land north of Tilurium, founding the nearby Colonia Claudia Aequum (at modern Čitluk near Sinj) after 45 AD.

Evidence from inscriptions and archaeological finds suggests that auxiliary units occupied Tilurium in the ensuing decades. For example, inscriptions of the Cohors III Alpinorum (Third Alpine cohort) attest to the presence of auxiliary troops at or near Tilurium in 75 AD. Remains of an auxiliary fort have been found approx. 550 m south of the legionary fortress on a karstic plateau above the river Cetina, which must have controlled the crossing.

=== Later Roman ===
As Roman rule endured, by the 3rd and 4th centuries the site probably functioned as a logistics station and defensive strongpoint on the road between the coast and interior. Archaeological finds show continued occupation into the Late Roman period.

During Late Antiquity Tilurium was a smaller fort or castellum. It was repaired or maintained to serve as a refuge against new threats as shown by coins and weapons from the reign of Justinian I (527–565 AD) found on site.

== The Site ==
The fortress of Tilurium was laid out in typical Roman fashion on the plateau about 339 m above sea level. The ramparts formed a rectangular enclosure of about 12 ha, adapted to the terrain. It gave a commanding view and field of fire over the surrounding valleys. The fortress was oriented to control the approach to the Pons Tiluri bridge and the principal gate probably opened towards the south or west, facing the river crossing.

Today, parts of the stone walls of the camp are still visible on the western and northern sides. Segments of the fort's perimeter are visible, including remains of corner towers and buttresses that reinforced the curtain walls. The construction was of dry-stone or mortared limestone, using local stone.

Excavations since 1997 have identified the layout of the main gateways of the camp. While gate structures have not been completely preserved, geophysical surveys and trenches have pinpointed breaks in the rampart where the porta praetoria (main gate) and other gates once stood. An amphitheatre and bathhouse were located just south of the camp's decumanus maximus (main east-west road). Also revealed was a monumental antique building with buttresses, a water cistern, a building with a figural mosaic, as well as numerous Roman artifacts, including fragments of high-quality ceramic and glassware, various jewelry and everyday objects, metal components of military gear, tools and weaponry, coin samples, and fragmented inscriptions and sculptures.

The camp contains part of a tropaion, a monument erected after the victory over the Delmatae, depicting the conquered Illyrians.

=== The Mosaics ===
A building with fragments of three mosaic floors lies in the centre of the camp, two older floors with smaller fragments and a later one of area almost 120 m^{2} in five fragments of around 12 m^{2}. The mosaics date to the turn of the 1st century BC and the 1st century AD. The later mosaic consists of white, pink and grey-black tiles, forming a geometric pattern of alternating black and white squares or rhombi. The central field used to feature a figure, but only the rear part of a bull has been preserved, consisting of white and pink tiles on a black background. The two older mosaics featured blue curls on a white background, and a geometric pattern of alternating rectangular fields of different colours.

== See also ==
- List of ancient cities in Illyria
