= Strizirep =

Settlement in Split-Dalmatia County, Croatia

- Settlement
- Interactive map of Strizirep
- Location within Croatia
- Coordinates: 43°35′29″N 16°50′09″E
- Country: Croatia
- County: Split-Dalmatia
- City: Trilj

Area
  - Total: 10.5 km^{2} (4.1 sq mi)

Population (2021)
  - Total: 33
  - Density: 3.1/km^{2} (8.1/sq mi)
- Time zone: UTC+1 (CET)
  - Summer (DST): UTC+2 (CEST)
- Postal code: 21240 Trilj
- Area code: +385 (0)21

Strizirep is a settlement in the City of Trilj in Croatia. In 2021, its population was 33.

== Demographics ==
Strizirep: Population trends 1857–2021
v

population	273	298	282	328	367	421	433	467	488	492	430	388	386	220	99	31	33
	1857	1869	1880	1890	1900	1910	1921	1931	1948	1953	1961	1971	1981	1991	2001	2011	2021

Sources: Croatian Bureau of Statistics publications
