= Velić, Croatia =

Settlement in Split-Dalmatia County, Croatia

Velić
- Settlement
- Interactive map of Velić
- Location within Croatia
- Coordinates: 43°37′26″N 16°47′13″E
- Country: Croatia
- County: Split-Dalmatia
- City: Trilj

Area
  - Total: 8.4 km^{2} (3.2 sq mi)

Population (2021)
  - Total: 266
  - Density: 32/km^{2} (82/sq mi)
- Time zone: UTC+1 (CET)
  - Summer (DST): UTC+2 (CEST)
- Postal code: 21240 Trilj
- Area code: +385 (0)21

Velić is a settlement in the City of Trilj in Croatia. In 2021, its population was 266.

== Demographics ==
Velić: Population trends 1857–2021
v

population	236	250	253	306	336	359	377	364	432	401	393	412	395	408	298	288	266
	1857	1869	1880	1890	1900	1910	1921	1931	1948	1953	1961	1971	1981	1991	2001	2011	2021

Sources: Croatian Bureau of Statistics publications
