= Vedrine =

Settlement in Split-Dalmatia County, Croatia

- Settlement
- Interactive map of Vedrine
- Location within Croatia
- Coordinates: 43°37′23″N 16°44′38″E
- Country: Croatia
- County: Split-Dalmatia
- City: Trilj

Area
  - Total: 6.8 km^{2} (2.6 sq mi)

Population (2021)
  - Total: 815
  - Density: 120/km^{2} (310/sq mi)
- Time zone: UTC+1 (CET)
  - Summer (DST): UTC+2 (CEST)
- Postal code: 21240 Trilj
- Area code: +385 (0)21

Vedrine is a settlement in the City of Trilj in Croatia. In 2021, its population was 815.

== Demographics ==
Vedrine: Population trends 1857–2021
v

population	188	620	368	299	356	415	646	464	480	479	481	545	759	735	779	851	815
	1857	1869	1880	1890	1900	1910	1921	1931	1948	1953	1961	1971	1981	1991	2001	2011	2021

Sources: Croatian Bureau of Statistics publications
