= Krivodol, Trilj =

Settlement in Split-Dalmatia County, Croatia

Krivodol
- Settlement
- Interactive map of Krivodol
- Location within Croatia
- Coordinates: 43°38′31″N 16°49′08″E
- Country: Croatia
- County: Split-Dalmatia
- City: Trilj

Area
  - Total: 10.9 km^{2} (4.2 sq mi)

Population (2021)
  - Total: 1
  - Density: 0.092/km^{2} (0.24/sq mi)
- Time zone: UTC+1 (CET)
  - Summer (DST): UTC+2 (CEST)
- Postal code: 21240 Trilj
- Area code: +385 (0)21

Krivodol is a settlement in the City of Trilj in Croatia. In 2021, its population was 1.

== Demographics ==
Krivodol: Population trends 1857–2021
v

population	164		210	201	215	368		295	226	226	221	147	31	11	6	2	1
	1857	1869	1880	1890	1900	1910	1921	1931	1948	1953	1961	1971	1981	1991	2001	2011	2021

Sources: Croatian Bureau of Statistics publications
