= 1962 Irpinia earthquake =

1962 earthquake in southern Italy

- Location within Italy
- UTC time: 1962-08-21 18:19:33
- ISC event: 875196
- USGS-ANSS: ComCat
- Local date: 21 August 1962
- Local time: 18:19 CET
- Magnitude: 6.15 M_{w}
- Depth: 9.0 km (5.6 mi)
- Epicenter: 41.22°N 15.01°E
- Type: Strike-slip
- Areas affected: Italy
- Max. intensity: MMI IX (Violent)
- Casualties: ≤20 dead

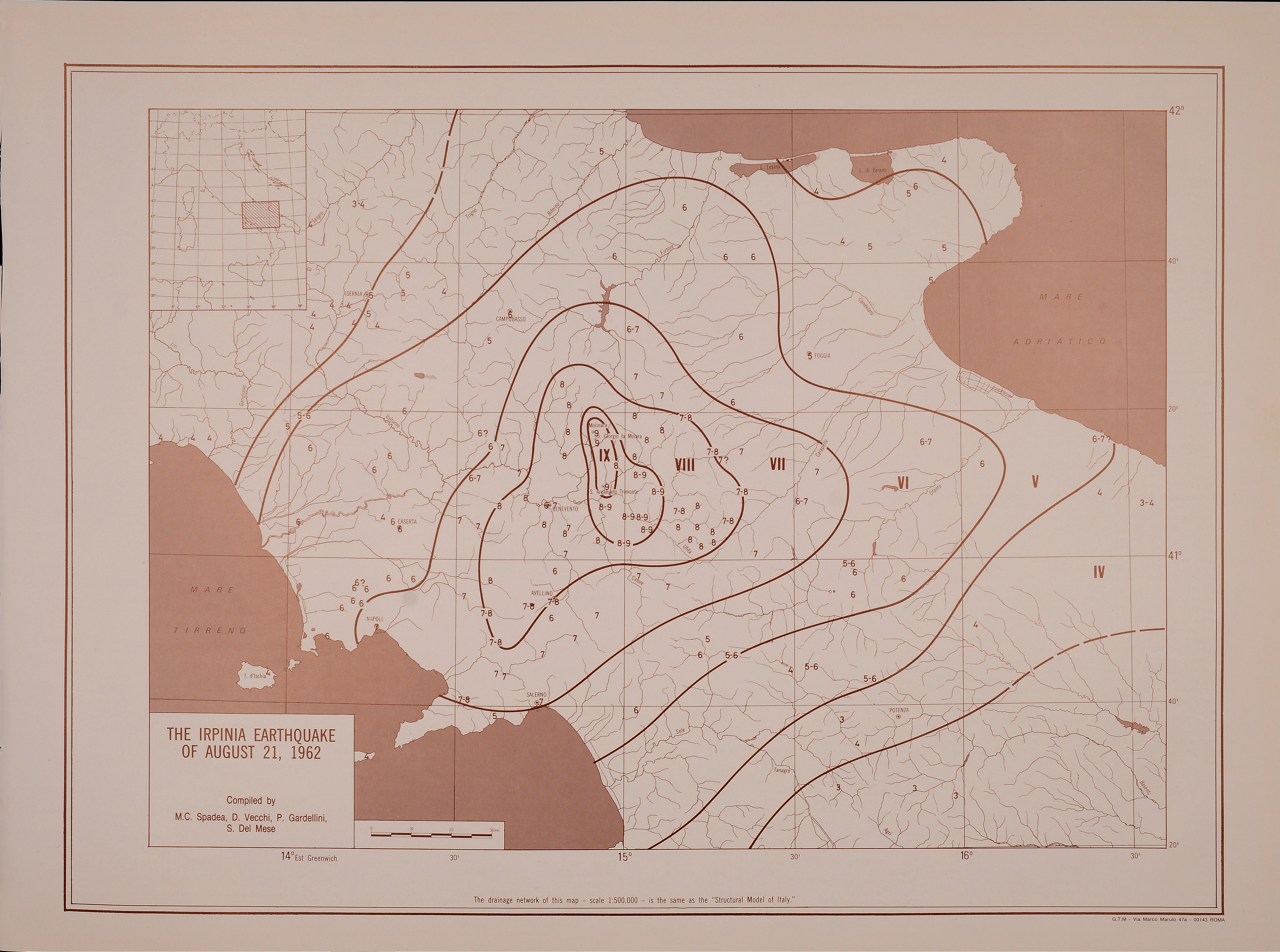
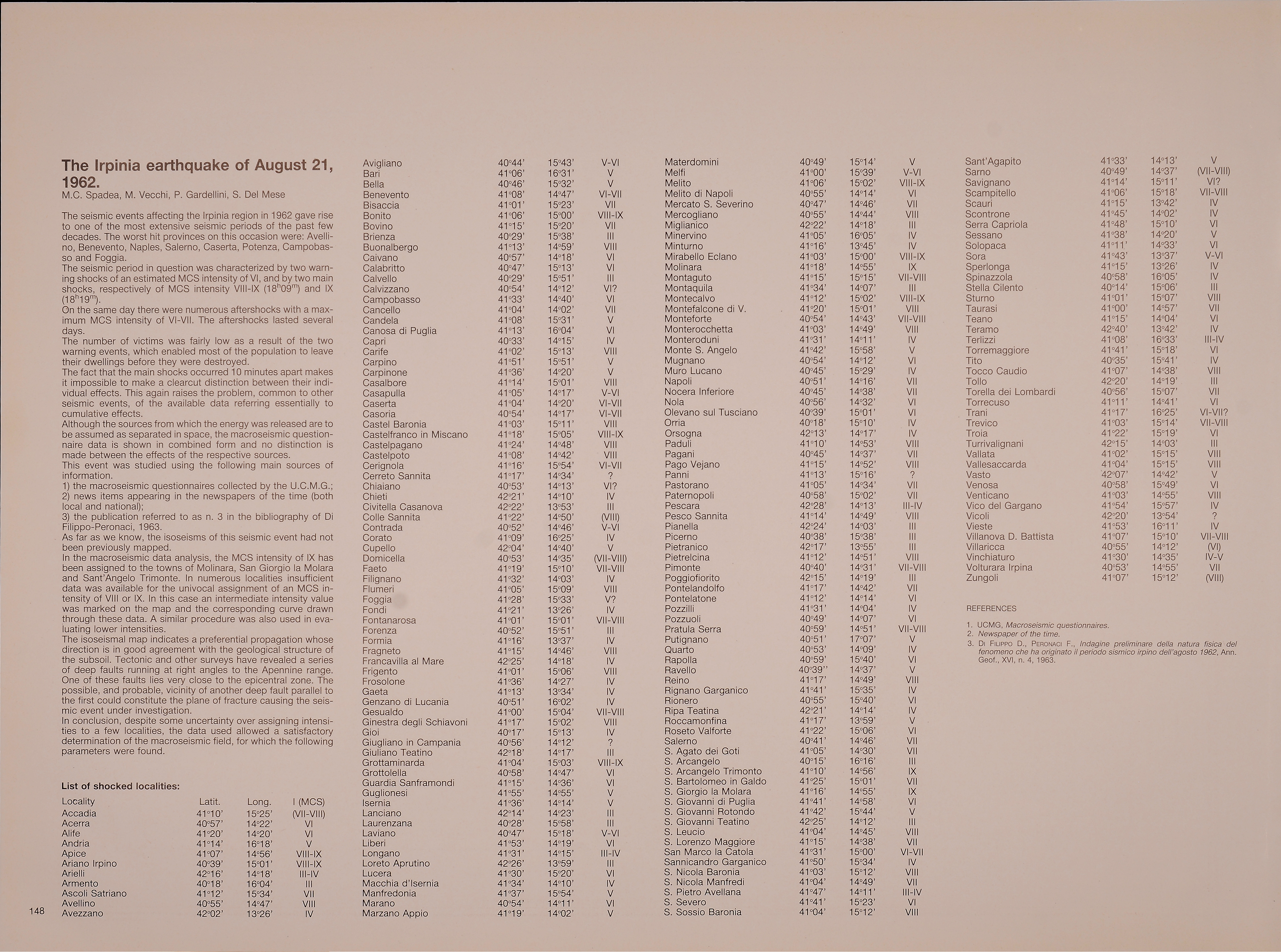
Map and details

The second shock in the 1962 Irpinia earthquake sequence was the largest and most destructive in a series of earthquakes in the southern Apennines. It occurred on 21 August at 18:19 CET, measuring M_{w} 6.15 and assigned a maximum intensity of IX (Violent). It was preceded by an M_{w} 5.68 foreshock, and followed by a 5.34 aftershock. The earthquakes resulted in nearly 20 fatalities and significant property losses.

== Tectonic setting ==
The central Italian Peninsula is dominated by active extensional tectonics, forming the Apennine Mountains. One explanation is that slab rollback is occurring within the Adriatic plate as it subducts beneath the Tyrrhenian Sea. Another explanation is because the back-arc basin in the Tyrrhenian Sea opening at a faster rate than the African plate is colliding with the Eurasian plate. Extensional tectonics in the region have been active since the Pliocene epoch, mainly accommodated by northwest–southeast striking normal faults. The faults associated with large earthquakes on the peninsula are geologically young in age, and rarely rupture the surface. Occasionally, strike-slip events like the 1456 Central Italy earthquakes, as well as the 1971 (M_{w} 5.0) and 2012 (M_{w} 4.6) moderate earthquakes in the southern Apennine region suggest the dominant style of faulting is not limited to normal dip-slip. Strike-slip faults on the Italian Peninsula are oriented east–west.

== Geology ==
Prior to the occurrence of the large foreshock at 18:09, a series of foreshocks were already present in the afternoon that same day. The mainshock struck at 18:19 with a moment magnitude of 6.15 M_{w} and Richter scale magnitude of 6.1 M_{L}. Very few aftershocks were instrumentally recorded; the largest measured 5.4 M_{L}. Both the foreshock and mainshock occurred at a depth of 8 km, based on waveform analysis, but this result is still controversial and unreliable. The lack of documented surface ruptures further instigated controversy into the mechanism of the earthquakes. The seismology community debated between strike-slip and normal faulting as the cause.

A study in 2016 reevaluated its depth to 9 km, and generated a reliable strike-slip focal mechanism. The epicenters are located between the zone of northwest–southeast trending normal faults and east–west striking strike-slip faults. The earthquake sequence represent strike-slip faulting with small normal components along either east–west or north–south trending faults. The location of the 1962 earthquakes is close to the faults that triggered the 1456 earthquakes.

== Impact ==
The first of three severe shocks occurred at 18:09 local time. While it did not cause any damage, it was felt strong enough to frighten residents in Benevento and Avellino. Many residents were driven out of their homes in fear of further shocks. The second shock was the most destructive and violent. It damaged 68 municipalities across the provinces of Benevento and Avellino. A maximum intensity of IX was assigned in the towns of Melito Irpino, Molinara, Reino, and Sant'Arcangelo Trimonte. These towns sustained heavy damage, with at least 90% of all structures affected. More than 50% of the total buildings affected were a total loss due to the severity of damage or complete destruction. Nearly twenty people died and 16,000 were made homeless.

=== Aftermath ===
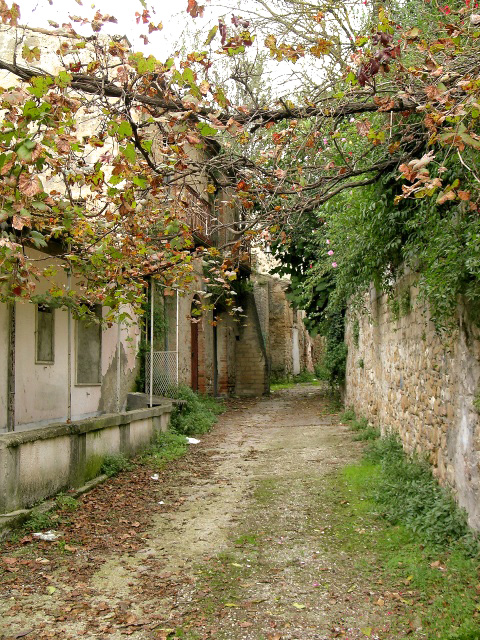
The town of Apice, abandoned after the earthquake.

The Council of Ministers, allocated 2 billion Italian liras for first responders and 400 million for assistance. More than 20,000 tents were erected over a period of next ten days for the homeless. Significant quantities of medical supplies, food and clothing were distributed. More than 2,000 barracks were constructed by civil and military engineers to house homeless.

After the earthquakes, there were concerns about the potential for landslides as the shocks had destabilized ground conditions on the nearby hills. As a result, authorities decided to evict the residents of Melito Irpino and Apice. The old medieval Melito Irpino is currently a ghost town.

== See also ==
- List of earthquakes in 1962
- List of earthquakes in Italy
