= Strmendolac =

- Settlement
- Location in Croatia Strmendolac (Croatia)
- Coordinates: 43.595°N 16.762°E
- Country: Croatia
- County: Split-Dalmatia County
- Municipality: Trilj

Area
  - Total: 5.7 km^{2} (2.2 sq mi)
- Elevation: 400 m (1,300 ft)

Population (2021)
  - Total: 158
  - Density: 28/km^{2} (72/sq mi)
- Time zone: UTC+1 (CET)
  - Summer (DST): UTC+2 (CEST)
- Postal code: 21240
- Area code: 021
- Vehicle registration: ST

Strmendolac is a settlement near Trilj in the Split-Dalmatia County of Croatia.

== Geography ==
Strmendolac is located at the Karst Plateau, 4 kilometers East of Trilj. The village can be reached by road from the South from Čaporice, from the Southeast, from the direction of Ugljane and from the main road from Trilj. The village is surrounded by mountains. Many streams run through the village, joining into one larger one called Krolin Potok. The village drinking water comes from 18 natural sources. The area has many karst formations, including caves, sinkholes and cracks. Garepuša is one of the largest caves in the area of Strmendolac, with a diameter about 4.5 meters. In the 1980s, the cave's colors began to reflect the colors of the stones from the river Grab. Two types of forests are present: deciduous forests of elm, ash and oak; and planted coniferous forests of pine and spruce.

== Demographics ==
The natives are Croats, who make up the majority of the population. Most of the population are members of the Roman Catholic Church. Since the 1990s, the population has experienced consistent decline. In 2011, the village had 221 residents.

== History ==
Strmendolac was settled in the Illyrian era, as documented by ruins and monuments. The Ottomans, crushed rural resistance and included the area in their empire. The most interesting archaeological finds in the region are seven-foot crosses. The church of St. Nicholas was built in 1767. During World War II the area was shelled by the Italian army. Villagers hid in ˝bunkers˝ that they had built at the war's beginning. At the end of the war, the villagers hid their weapons in the hills. Care must be taken when visiting wooded areas, because weapons may still be hidden there.

The Turks ruled for almost two hundred years until in the early 16th century, Venetians ruled, most villages around Kamešnica were based in Herzegovina. Some Muslims converted to Christianity during this period. After 1691, the area returned to Turkish hands. The Požarevačka Peace Treaty was concluded in 1718 after a military coup. Kamešnica was thereby freed from the Turkish authorities. In 1732, the area became part of the newly established parish of Ugljane and joined the parish church during this reorganization. Under Venetian rule in 1797, the area was torn apart again when Austrian troops marched into the hinterland of Dalmatia. In 1806, the territory was ruled by the French, but again returned to the hands of the Austrians after the defeat of Napoleon at Leipzig in 1813.

The village had 173 inhabitants in 1857 and up to 225 inhabitants in 1910. In 1918, the area was considered a new Serbo-Croatian-Slovenian state, and it then became part of the first Jugoslavije. During the war, the territory was not under any direct authority. Italian military troops planned attacks on the area, but no army entered the area for fear of ambush. After the war, the area became a part of socialist Yugoslavia.

Since 1991, Strmendolac has belonged to Croatia.

== Sport ==
"Rural Olympics" were traditionally held on May 1. According to some data, some 2000 people once attended. Games and competitions included football, archery, and shooting.
