= Ljut =

Settlement in Split-Dalmatia County, Croatia

- Settlement
- Interactive map of Ljut
- Location within Croatia
- Coordinates: 43°38′13″N 16°51′50″E
- Country: Croatia
- County: Split-Dalmatia
- City: Trilj

Area
  - Total: 5.5 km^{2} (2.1 sq mi)

Population (2021)
  - Total: 6
  - Density: 1.1/km^{2} (2.8/sq mi)
- Time zone: UTC+1 (CET)
  - Summer (DST): UTC+2 (CEST)
- Postal code: 21240 Trilj
- Area code: +385 (0)21

Ljut is a settlement in the City of Trilj in Croatia. In 2021, its population was 6.

== Demographics ==
Ljut: Population trends 1857–2021
v

population			11	46	82	251			145	192	212	168	33	25	10	5	6
	1857	1869	1880	1890	1900	1910	1921	1931	1948	1953	1961	1971	1981	1991	2001	2011	2021

Note:Data for 1857, 1869, 1921 and 1931 population data are contained in the settlement of Voštane, as well as part of the data from 1880 to 1900. From 1880 to 1910, it was reported as part of the settlement. Sources: Croatian Bureau of Statistics publications
