= Tijarica =

Settlement in Split-Dalmatia County, Croatia

- Settlement
- Interactive map of Tijarica
- Location within Croatia
- Coordinates: 43°35′17″N 16°55′05″E
- Country: Croatia
- County: Split-Dalmatia
- City: Trilj

Area
  - Total: 44.6 km^{2} (17.2 sq mi)

Population (2021)
  - Total: 366
  - Density: 8.21/km^{2} (21.3/sq mi)
- Time zone: UTC+1 (CET)
  - Summer (DST): UTC+2 (CEST)
- Postal code: 21240 Trilj
- Area code: +385 (0)21

Tijarica is a settlement in the City of Trilj in Croatia. In 2021, its population was 366.

== Demographics ==
Tijarica: Population trends 1857–2021
v

population	806	946	1022	1156	1333	1452	1469	1525	1511	1518	1458	1407	1250	1068	750	374	366
	1857	1869	1880	1890	1900	1910	1921	1931	1948	1953	1961	1971	1981	1991	2001	2011	2021

Sources: Croatian Bureau of Statistics publications
