= Jabuka, Croatia =

Settlement in Split-Dalmatia County, Croatia

Jabuka
- Settlement
- Interactive map of Jabuka
- Location within Croatia
- Coordinates: 43°37′59″N 16°45′18″E
- Country: Croatia
- County: Split-Dalmatia
- City: Trilj

Area
  - Total: 6.1 km^{2} (2.4 sq mi)

Population (2021)
  - Total: 239
  - Density: 39/km^{2} (100/sq mi)
- Time zone: UTC+1 (CET)
  - Summer (DST): UTC+2 (CEST)
- Postal code: 21240 Trilj
- Area code: +385 (0)21

Jabuka is a settlement in the City of Trilj in Croatia. In 2021, its population was 239.

== Demographics ==
Jabuka: Population trends 1857–2021
v

population	187		154	247	295	330	320	362	341	369	381	371	404	355	341	306	239
	1857	1869	1880	1890	1900	1910	1921	1931	1948	1953	1961	1971	1981	1991	2001	2011	2021

Sources: Croatian Bureau of Statistics publications
