= Nova Sela, Trilj =

Settlement in Split-Dalmatia County, Croatia

Nova Sela
- Settlement
- Interactive map of Nova Sela
- Location within Croatia
- Coordinates: 43°31′16″N 16°47′02″E
- Country: Croatia
- County: Split-Dalmatia
- City: Trilj

Area
  - Total: 6.2 km^{2} (2.4 sq mi)

Population (2021)
  - Total: 141
  - Density: 23/km^{2} (59/sq mi)
- Time zone: UTC+1 (CET)
  - Summer (DST): UTC+2 (CEST)
- Postal code: 21240 Trilj
- Area code: +385 (0)21

Nova Sela is a settlement in the City of Trilj in Croatia. In 2021, its population was 141.

== Demographics ==
Nova Sela: Population trends 1857–2021
v

population	297		125	224	174	194		391	358	378	361	345	284	503	165	139	141
	1857	1869	1880	1890	1900	1910	1921	1931	1948	1953	1961	1971	1981	1991	2001	2011	2021

Sources: Croatian Bureau of Statistics publications
