= 1962 Makarska earthquakes =

Earthquakes on the eastern Adriatic coast

- Location within Croatia
- UTC time
- 1962-01-07 10:03:13
- 1962-01-11 05:05:03
- ISC event
- 873992
- 874017
- USGS-ANSS
- ComCat
- ComCat
- Local date
- January 07, 1962
- January 11, 1962
- Local time
- 11:03:13 CET
- 06:05:03 CET
- Magnitude
- A: 5.9 M_{L} 6.2 M_{w}
- B: 6.2 M_{w}
- Depth: 15.0 km (9.3 mi)
- Epicenter: 43.247°N 17.019°E
- Max. intensity: MMI VIII (Severe); MMI IX (Violent)
- Tsunami: Yes
- Casualties: January 7: 4 fatalities January 11: 2 fatalities Total: 6 fatalities

The 1962 Makarska earthquakes occurred on January 7 to January 11 near the towns of Podgora and Makarska in Dalmatia, Croatia (at the time part of SFR Yugoslavia). The event is what is known as a doublet earthquake, where there are two or more main shocks occurring in a short span of time. The two earthquake measured 6.2 on the moment magnitude scale. The first tremor was assigned VIII (Severe), and the second event IX (Violent) on the Modified Mercalli intensity scale.

The earthquakes killed a total of 6 people, and caused damage to vulnerable structures. A tsunami may have been triggered by the quakes according to nearby tide gauges.

== Geological location ==
Dalmatia, the southern part of Croatia, is located in a tectonic thrust zone in the Adriatic basin with the African and Eurasian plates colliding within it. However, some believe that the entirety of the Adriatic lies in a separate micro-plate known as the Apulia-Adriatic micro-plate that moves northeast into the Swiss Alps at a rate of about 1-2 millimeters in the north and 4-5 millimeters in the south. In the west, it's situated nearby the Dinaric Alps which runs through the Balkan peninsula all the way to Albania in the south. It also neighbors the Italian west coast which is also a hot zone for earthquakes and where you can find the Apennine Mountains, also known as the spine of the Italian peninsula.

Due to this, the entirety of the Croatian west coast is exposed to seismic activity, which includes earthquakes with magnitudes above 6. The most notable event is the 1667 Dubrovnik earthquake that occurred near the town of Dubrovnik reaching intensities as high as IX resulting in the deaths of many.

== Earthquakes ==
=== January 7 ===
The first earthquake measured a preliminary 5.8 on the body wave magnitude scale and was initially believed to be a foreshock to the second earthquake; however, this idea was later ruled out. Its epicenter was between the town of Makarska in the mainland and the island of Hvar southwest.

=== January 11 ===
The second earthquake was much stronger with magnitudes of 6.1–6.2. It was deemed the mainshock of the two. Fortunately it occurred further from population centres such as Makarska and Podgora. Despite this, many more buildings were damaged and local accounts said the residents were more terrified.

Further shocks rocked the area for 15 days, damaging local infrastructure and further levelling buildings on the islands near the epicenter, especially on Hvar.

=== Tsunami ===
There has been some speculation that the strength of the earthquake was enough to generate a tsunami a high as one meter in height. Further studies revealed that gauges recorded a small change in wave height right after the earthquake struck. However, no tsunami was noticed by the locals and no damage was caused by the said tsunami.

== Damage and casualties ==
According to local information, 3,256 buildings and houses completely collapsed, 108 of them being schools, and about 500 others were seriously damaged to the point of being demolished soon afterwards. Makarska suffered the full brunt having 193 buildings collapsed from the second earthquake, followed by Podgora with 111 and Drašnice having 100 buildings collapsed. About 400 other buildings were spared by only suffering cracks in the walls and only needed reparations.

The first earthquake killed four people, most likely from falling debris and collapsed walls. The second quake, which was much better documented, killed two people. One of them was Emil Marinović, 20 years of age when his house fell onto him in Podgora. Another person from Drašnice, 62-year-old Jure Prlac was killed after he was hit in a local landslide.

In response, the Yugoslav army sent 200 tents to accommodate the 3,500 people most affected, however the majority decided to flee the area and seek refuge in other areas. In the years that followed the area still greatly suffered from the effects of the earthquakes and more people left for other areas. At one point there were only 200 residents left in Makarska.

== Impact ==
The local populace in the afflicted areas was forced to evacuate due to the heavy damage and the devastating consequences that were caused by the earthquakes. The effects of this event can still be observed, especially in Makarska and nearby Biokovsko Selo where the village is still very much silent. The elderly residents remember the event in shocking detail. The earthquake is also well known in seismic studies in Croatia. Ivan Hrstić, a local scientist, discussed the earthquake during a scientific conference in 2012.

== See also ==
- 1667 Dubrovnik earthquake
- 1898 Trilj earthquake
- 1996 Ston–Slano earthquake
- List of earthquakes in 1962
- List of earthquakes in Croatia
