= Čaporice =

Settlement in Split-Dalmatia County, Croatia

- Settlement
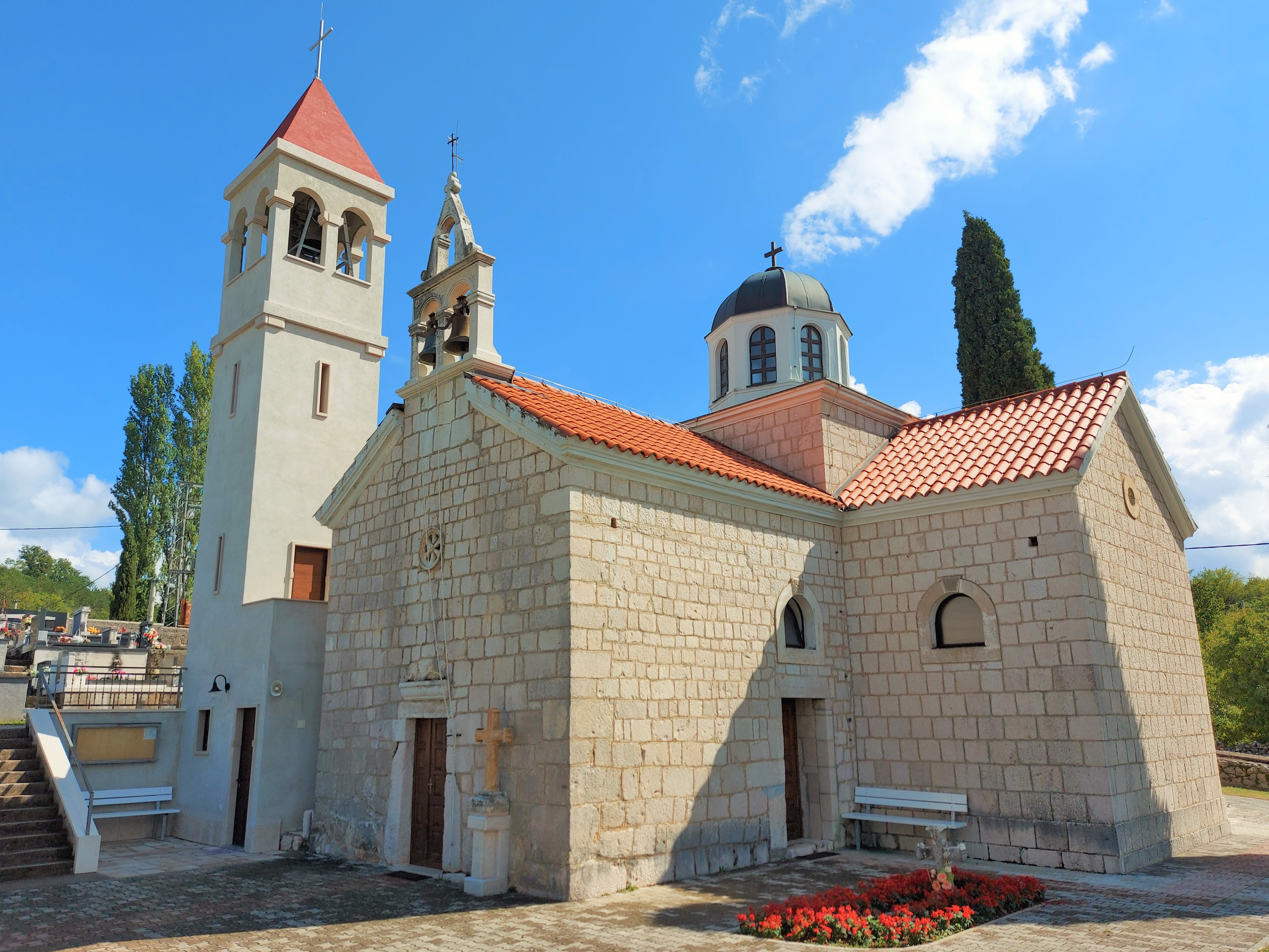
- Parish Church of Saint Roch in Čaporice
- Interactive map of Čaporice
- Location within Croatia
- Coordinates: 43°35′42″N 16°43′52″E
- Country: Croatia
- County: Split-Dalmatia
- City: Trilj

Area
  - Total: 6.6 km^{2} (2.5 sq mi)

Population (2021)
  - Total: 328
  - Density: 50/km^{2} (130/sq mi)
- Time zone: UTC+1 (CET)
  - Summer (DST): UTC+2 (CEST)
- Postal code: 21240 Trilj
- Area code: +385 (0)21

Čaporice is a settlement in the City of Trilj in Croatia. In 2021, its population was 328.

== Demographics ==
Čaporice: Population trends 1857–2021
v

population	395	475	483	585	677	599	646	731	613	708	655	638	628	819	421	389	328
	1857	1869	1880	1890	1900	1910	1921	1931	1948	1953	1961	1971	1981	1991	2001	2011	2021

Sources: Croatian Bureau of Statistics publications
