= Podi, Croatia =

Settlement in Split-Dalmatia County, Croatia

Podi
- Settlement
- Interactive map of Podi
- Location within Croatia
- Coordinates: 43°39′18″N 16°47′31″E
- Country: Croatia
- County: Split-Dalmatia
- City: Trilj

Area
  - Total: 6.9 km^{2} (2.7 sq mi)

Population (2021)
  - Total: 4
  - Density: 0.58/km^{2} (1.5/sq mi)
- Time zone: UTC+1 (CET)
  - Summer (DST): UTC+2 (CEST)
- Postal code: 21240 Trilj
- Area code: +385 (0)21

Podi is a settlement in the City of Trilj in Croatia. In 2021, its population was 4.

== Demographics ==
Podi: Population trends 1857–2021
v

population	324		138	354	542	369		797	588	492	444	299	139	49	28	13	4
	1857	1869	1880	1890	1900	1910	1921	1931	1948	1953	1961	1971	1981	1991	2001	2011	2021

Sources: Croatian Bureau of Statistics publications
