= Voštane =

Settlement in Split-Dalmatia County, Croatia

- Settlement
- Interactive map of Voštane
- Location within Croatia
- Coordinates: 43°39′40″N 16°54′07″E
- Country: Croatia
- County: Split-Dalmatia
- City: Trilj

Area
  - Total: 24.5 km^{2} (9.5 sq mi)

Population (2021)
  - Total: 26
  - Density: 1.1/km^{2} (2.7/sq mi)
- Time zone: UTC+1 (CET)
  - Summer (DST): UTC+2 (CEST)
- Postal code: 21240 Trilj
- Area code: +385 (0)21

Voštane is a settlement in the city of Trilj in Croatia, located near the border with Bosnia and Herzegovina. In 2021, its population was 26.

== Demographics ==
Voštane: Population trends 1857–2021
v

population	434	702	516	662	568	599	826	826	330	415	476	465	418	313	157	42	26
	1857	1869	1880	1890	1900	1910	1921	1931	1948	1953	1961	1971	1981	1991	2001	2011	2021

Sources: Croatian Bureau of Statistics publications

== Landmarks ==
A historic burial ground from the 14th and 15th centuries is situated at the locality "Na Mašete". Most of some 40 grave markers are simple flat slates, but the site also contains several gabled tombstones (stećci), which feature relief carvings depicting fighters and hunting expeditions.

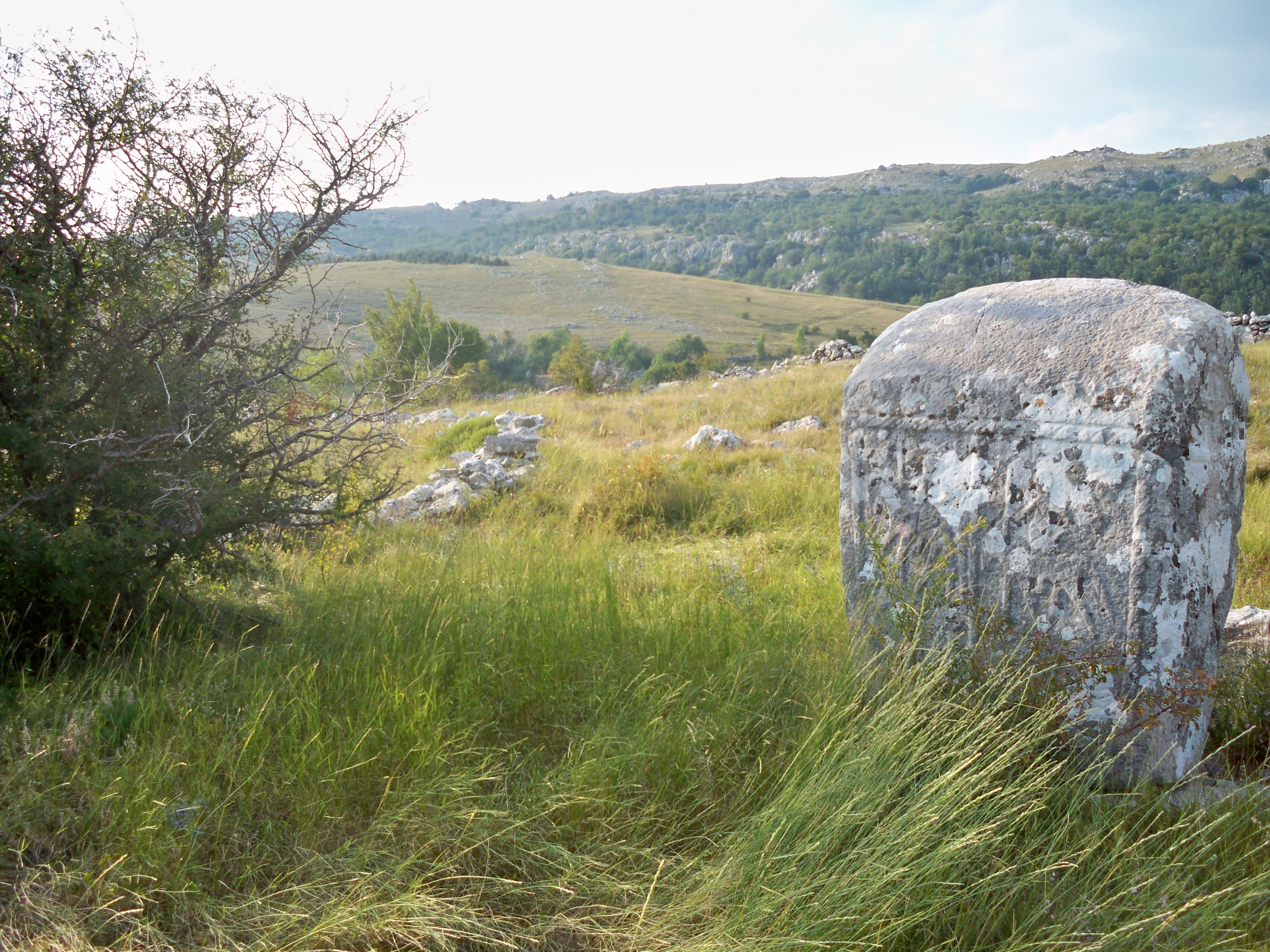
Stećak at the "Na Mašete" locality near Voštane

The sizable stone Parish Church of the Holy Name of Jesus, constructed in 1935 over the foundations of an earlier church, stands as the main religious center; it was significantly updated through renovations in the 1970s and 80s. The village also holds historical significance with its Chapel of St Clement, a 19th-century structure once used by the pastor, which reflects the expansion of St Clement's cult from Poljica, where he is honored as the guardian of cattle.
