= 1962 Buin Zahra earthquake =

Earthquake in Iran

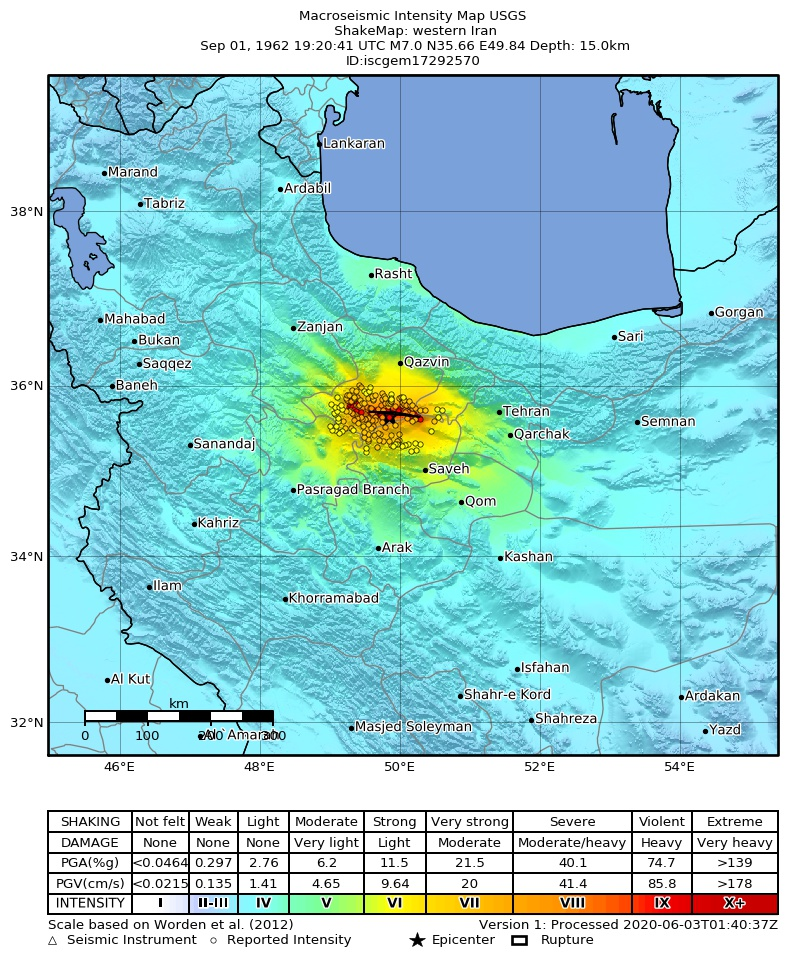
- USGS ShakeMap

- Location within Iran
- UTC time: 1962-09-01 19:20:41
- ISC event: 17292570
- USGS-ANSS: ComCat
- Local date: September 1, 1962
- Local time: 22:50:41 IRST
- Magnitude: 7.1 M_{L}
- Depth: 10 km (6.2 mi)
- Epicenter: 35.63°N 49.87°E
- Fault: Ipak Fault
- Areas affected: Iran
- Max. intensity: MMI IX (Violent)
- Casualties: at least 12,225 dead, 2,776 injured

The 1962 Buin Zahra earthquake (Persian: زمین‌لرزه ۱۳۴۱ بویین‌زهرا) occurred on September 1 in the area of Buin Zahra, Qazvin province, Iran. The shock had a Richter magnitude of 7.1 and resulted in 12,225 fatalities. Qazvin Province lies in an area of Iran that experiences large earthquakes. The 1962 event originated on one of many faults in the area, called the Ipak Fault. The fault is believed to have been reactivated multiple times.

== Geology ==
Iran is a seismically active zone, lying between the converging Eurasian and Arabian plates. Because it has both strike-slip and reverse faults, earthquakes often proceed so that if one fault is overwhelmed by movement, the movement will branch off to another fault, creating a separate earthquake.

Buin Zahra County lies within a zone of active thrust faults, complemented by folds, that extends south from the Alborz mountains. Despite the presence of faults, Qazvin province does not regularly experience earthquakes. However, the space between earthquakes allows pressure to build up on faults, increasing the power – and magnitude – of the earthquakes.

Specifically, the 1962 event originated on the Ipak Fault of northern Iran, along which it and aftershocks cut roughly 64 miles (103 km) of west-northwest trending surface faulting. A feature that extends for 64 miles (103 km) with its connected, smaller faults, the fault runs from the village of Ipak to Takhrijin. Iranian geologist Manuel Berberian's research indicates that the Ipak Fault is at least as old as the Carboniferous period, and has probably been reactivated several times since its formation. On the fault's south side, Carboniferous material is visible; this debris is not evident on the north side, which suggests that the fault was acting as a "dividing fault" while the area around it underwent sedimentation. Berberian could find no trace of Upper Guadalopian or Julfian sediments north of the fault. Another possible reason for this anomaly could be erosion; uplift could have exposed the northern portion of the fault but not the south.

== Damage and casualties ==
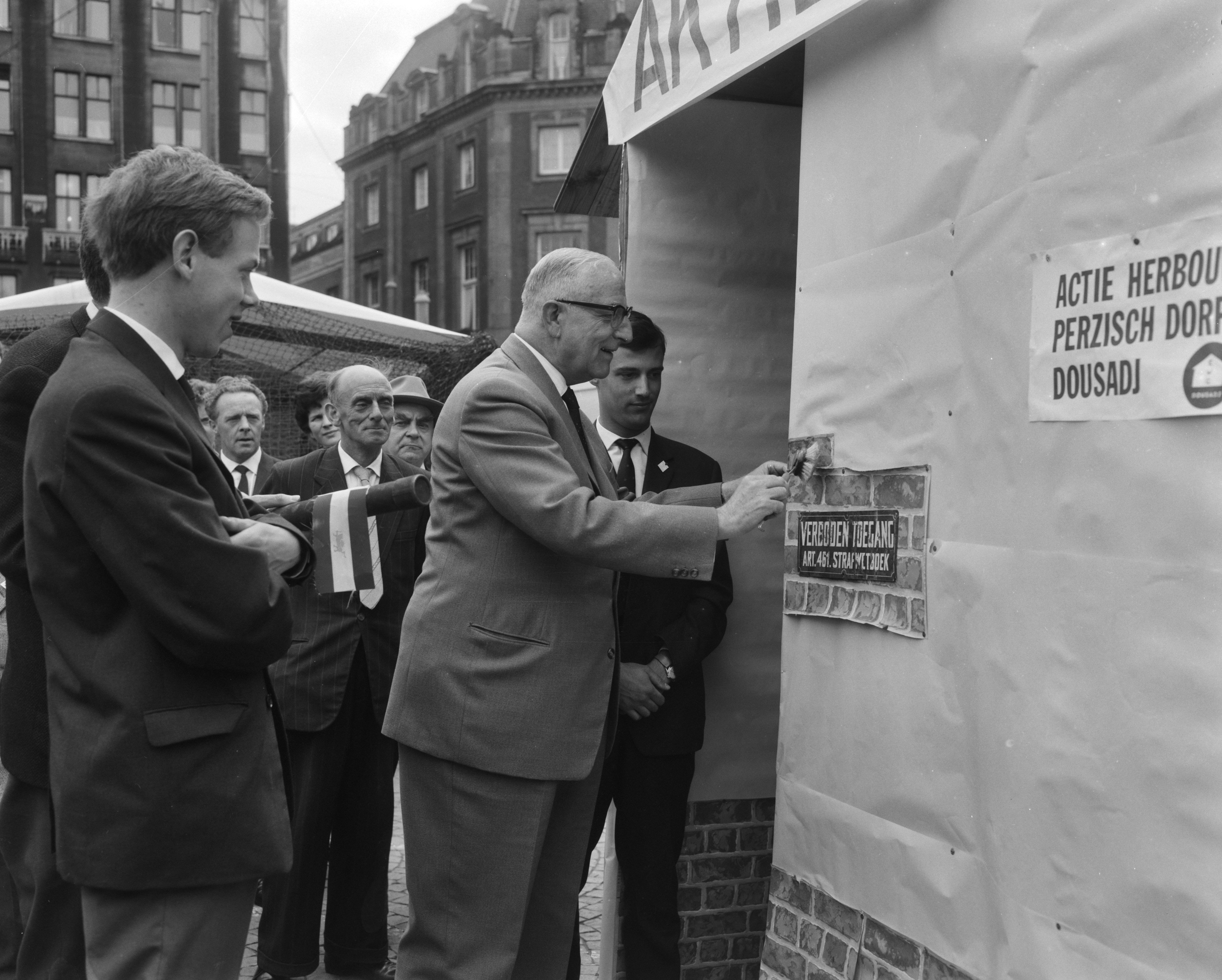
"Actie Herbouw Perzisch Dorp Dousadj" ("action rebuilding of the Persian village Dousadj") organized by the Dutch people

12,225 fatalities resulted from the earthquake. An additional 2,776 people were injured, along with 21,310 houses either destroyed or too damaged to repair. 35 percent of domestic livestock was also killed, and several landslides and rock falls followed the rupture. 21,000 houses were destroyed, mainly because they were made up of mud and brick. Over 7,500 were buried in 31 individual villages, followed by reports from 60 additional villages. In these villages, however, 26,618 survived. One hospital in Tehran was "packed" with over 2,500 victims. Queen Juliana of the Netherlands visited the earthquake site in a state visit the next year. Dutch charities had helped rebuild the area.

Slight damage was experienced in Tehran, the nation's capital. Cities as far away as Tabriz, Esfahan and Yazd reported the tremor. Sandblows also formed along the rupture zone. The earthquake was also declared the largest rupture in the region since approximately 1630. Multiple reports came from the Rudak area of earthquake lights.

== Relief efforts ==
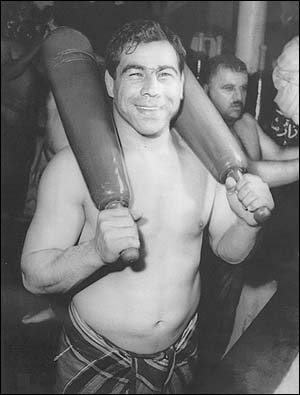
Gholamreza Takhti and students organized relief efforts.

Rescue operators suggested that an aerial and on-land search should be initiated to help victims. Officials expressed worries that people had gone for over a week with no aid. Iranian wrestling star Gholamreza Takhti gathered blankets, money, and food for victims and transported them by trucks. Because government response was slow, students at the University of Tehran took matters into their own hands. After gathering supplies, the students organized an effort to dispatch medical students and interns to the site of the disaster. Their teams were however blocked by Iranian National Guard members who had been commanded to kill any civilians who tried to help victims; writer Marcello di Cintio cites in Poets and Pahlevans: A Journey into the Heart of Iran that the "Shah was not about to let a crowd of students draw attention to his inept relief efforts".

== Future threats ==
Since roughly 90 percent of Iran lies within seismically active land, the threat from earthquakes is high. In 2002, an earthquake in Buin Zahra killed more than 250 people and left roughly 25,000 without homes.

In addition to its geological threat, Iran has poor earthquake engineering. In a 2004 report by ScienceDaily, it was listed as "the worst offender" globally for poor earthquake engineering. Professor Roger Bilham of the University of Colorado at Boulder, a geophysicist who specializes in earthquake-related deformation and hazards, blames construction practices for the fact that since the start of the 20th century, 1 in 3,000 Iranians has died in an earthquake-related incident. Bilham adds, "Most of Iran needs rebuilding. If the population of Iran had a choice between spending oil revenues on munitions or houses that won't kill them, I suspect they would choose a safe home. It's all a matter of earthquake education." A Common Country Assessment by The United Nations for Iran has similar results, stating that, "While adequate building regulations exist for large cities, it is generally believed that they are not rigorously adhered to... most of those who have suffered in recent major earthquakes have lived in small towns and villages. Earthquake-proof construction is very rare in those areas and adequate building regulations are not yet in place".

== Gallery ==
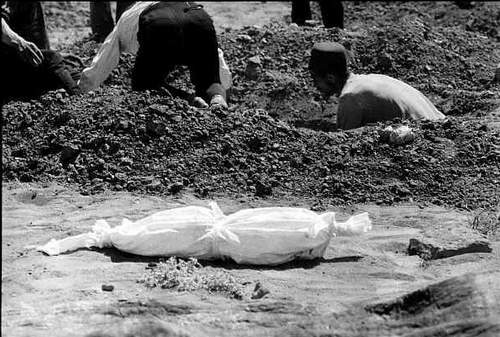

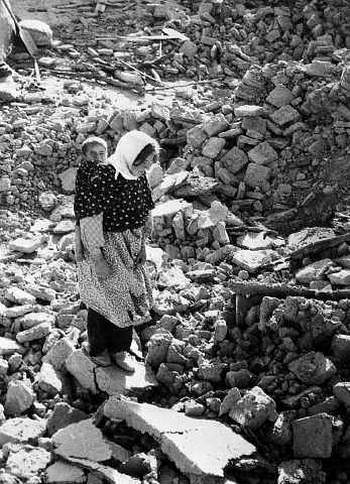

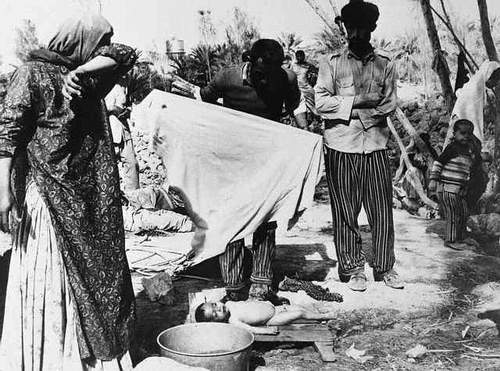

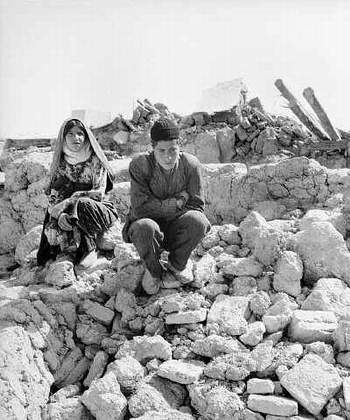

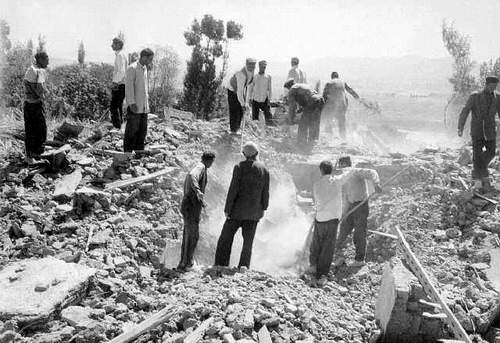

== See also ==
- List of earthquakes in 1962
- List of earthquakes in Iran

== Bibliography ==
- Ambraseys, N. N. (July 1, 1963). "The Buyin-Zara (Iran) earthquake of September, 1962 a field report". Bulletin of the Seismological Society of America. 53 (4): 705. Bibcode:1963BuSSA..53..705A. doi:10.1785/BSSA0530040705. Archived from the original on July 24, 2011.
- Berberian, Manuel (1976). "The 1962 Earthquake and Earlier Deformations Abong (sic) the Ipak Earthquake Fault". Geological Survey of Iran. 39: 419–427.
- Mostafazadeh, Mehrdad; Mokhtari, Mohammad (2003). "Source Time Function of Caspian Basin and Surrounding Area Earthquakes" (PDF). Journal of Seismology and Earthquake Engineering. 5 (3). International Institute of Earthquake Engineering and Seismology (IIEES). Archived from the original (PDF) on September 28, 2011.
