= Vojnić Sinjski =

Settlement in Split-Dalmatia County, Croatia

- Settlement
- Interactive map of Vojnić Sinjski
- Location within Croatia
- Coordinates: 43°36′50″N 16°41′20″E
- Country: Croatia
- County: Split-Dalmatia
- City: Trilj

Area
  - Total: 10.3 km^{2} (4.0 sq mi)

Population (2021)
  - Total: 433
  - Density: 42.0/km^{2} (109/sq mi)
- Time zone: UTC+1 (CET)
  - Summer (DST): UTC+2 (CEST)
- Postal code: 21240 Trilj
- Area code: +385 (0)21

Vojnić Sinjski is a settlement in the City of Trilj in Croatia. In 2021, its population was 433.

== Demographics ==
Vojnić Sinjski: Population trends 1857–2021
v

population	426	471	482	537	643	617	660	742	723	802	811	738	744	685	579	577	433
	1857	1869	1880	1890	1900	1910	1921	1931	1948	1953	1961	1971	1981	1991	2001	2011	2021

Sources: Croatian Bureau of Statistics publications
