= Vrabač =

Settlement in Split-Dalmatia County, Croatia

- Settlement
- Interactive map of Vrabač
- Location within Croatia
- Coordinates: 43°39′22″N 16°45′14″E
- Country: Croatia
- County: Split-Dalmatia
- City: Trilj

Area
  - Total: 1.9 km^{2} (0.73 sq mi)

Population (2021)
  - Total: 219
  - Density: 120/km^{2} (300/sq mi)
- Time zone: UTC+1 (CET)
  - Summer (DST): UTC+2 (CEST)
- Postal code: 21240 Trilj
- Area code: +385 (0)21

Vrabač is a settlement in the City of Trilj in Croatia. In 2021, its population was 219.

== Demographics ==
Vrabač: Population trends 1857–2021
v

population	83		92	192	243	123			251	245	228	236	224	237	197	218	219
	1857	1869	1880	1890	1900	1910	1921	1931	1948	1953	1961	1971	1981	1991	2001	2011	2021

Sources: Croatian Bureau of Statistics publications
