= Ugljane =

Settlement in Split-Dalmatia County, Croatia

- Settlement
- Interactive map of Ugljane
- Location within Croatia
- Coordinates: 43°34′16″N 16°45′36″E
- Country: Croatia
- County: Split-Dalmatia
- City: Trilj

Area
  - Total: 24.3 km^{2} (9.4 sq mi)

Population (2021)
  - Total: 336
  - Density: 13.8/km^{2} (35.8/sq mi)
- Time zone: UTC+1 (CET)
  - Summer (DST): UTC+2 (CEST)
- Postal code: 21240 Trilj
- Area code: +385 (0)21

Ugljane is a settlement in the City of Trilj in Croatia. In 2021, its population was 336.

== Demographics ==
Ugljane: Population trends 1857–2021
v

| population | 659 | 1042 | 965 | 1061 | 1287 | 1152 | 1355 | 1036 | 985 | 1048 | 1028 | 840 | 777 | 823 | 486 | 398 | 336 |
| | 1857 | 1869 | 1880 | 1890 | 1900 | 1910 | 1921 | 1931 | 1948 | 1953 | 1961 | 1971 | 1981 | 1991 | 2001 | 2011 | 2021 |

Sources: Croatian Bureau of Statistics publications
