= Rože =

Settlement in Split-Dalmatia County, Croatia

- Settlement
- Interactive map of Rože
- Location within Croatia
- Coordinates: 43°39′47″N 16°50′38″E
- Country: Croatia
- County: Split-Dalmatia
- City: Trilj

Area
  - Total: 6.2 km^{2} (2.4 sq mi)

Population (2021)
  - Total: 22
  - Density: 3.5/km^{2} (9.2/sq mi)
- Time zone: UTC+1 (CET)
  - Summer (DST): UTC+2 (CEST)
- Postal code: 21240 Trilj
- Area code: +385 (0)21

Rože is a settlement in the City of Trilj in Croatia. In 2021, its population was 22.

== History ==
On 24 March 2022 at 14:09 the ŽVOC Split received a call about a wildfire in the area. 360 hectares (890 acres) burned by the time it was put out at 11:00 on the 27th by DVD Trilj with the help of a Canadair CL-415.

== Demographics ==
Rože: Population trends 1857–2021
v

population	206		233	203	249	233	315	337	328	351	374	329	253	247	102	32	22
	1857	1869	1880	1890	1900	1910	1921	1931	1948	1953	1961	1971	1981	1991	2001	2011	2021

Sources: Croatian Bureau of Statistics publications
