= Brnobići =

Brnobići may refer to the following places in Croatia:

- Brnobići, Buzet
- Brnobići, Kaštelir-Labinci
