= Košute =

- Coordinates: 43.629044°N 16.706261°E

Area
  - Total: 14.0 km^{2} (5.4 sq mi)

Population (2021)
  - Total: 1,667
  - Density: 120/km^{2} (310/sq mi)

Košute is a village in southern Croatia located west of Trilj. The population is 1,740 (census 2011).
