= Grab, Split-Dalmatia County =

Settlement in Split-Dalmatia County, Croatia

Grab
- Settlement
- Interactive map of Grab
- Location within Croatia
- Coordinates: 43°38′49″N 16°45′40″E
- Country: Croatia
- County: Split-Dalmatia
- City: Trilj

Area
  - Total: 5.7 km^{2} (2.2 sq mi)

Population (2021)
  - Total: 523
  - Density: 92/km^{2} (240/sq mi)
- Time zone: UTC+1 (CET)
  - Summer (DST): UTC+2 (CEST)
- Postal code: 21240 Trilj
- Area code: +385 (0)21

Grab is a settlement in the City of Trilj in Croatia. In 2021, its population was 523.

== Demographics ==
Grab: Population trends 1857–2021
v

| population | 74 | 834 | 418 | 282 | 268 | 383 | 1380 | 272 | 235 | 390 | 412 | 565 | 774 | 795 | 687 | 546 | 523 |
| | 1857 | 1869 | 1880 | 1890 | 1900 | 1910 | 1921 | 1931 | 1948 | 1953 | 1961 | 1971 | 1981 | 1991 | 2001 | 2011 | 2021 |

Sources: Croatian Bureau of Statistics publications

== Landmarks ==
The source and the upper flow of the Grab River, known for its natural beauty and cultural heritage, is a protected important landscape. A right-bank trail follows the 2 km river, entering a short canyon with hornbeam, oak, and willowwoods. The river branches into ponds with small waterfalls. Wildlife includes around a dozen bird species and about a dozen reptile and amphibian species.

Several old flour mills are situated near the source of the Grab River. The oldest date back to the 17th century, with construction continuing until the 19th century. Some of these mills are still operational, offering a glimpse into past ways of life.

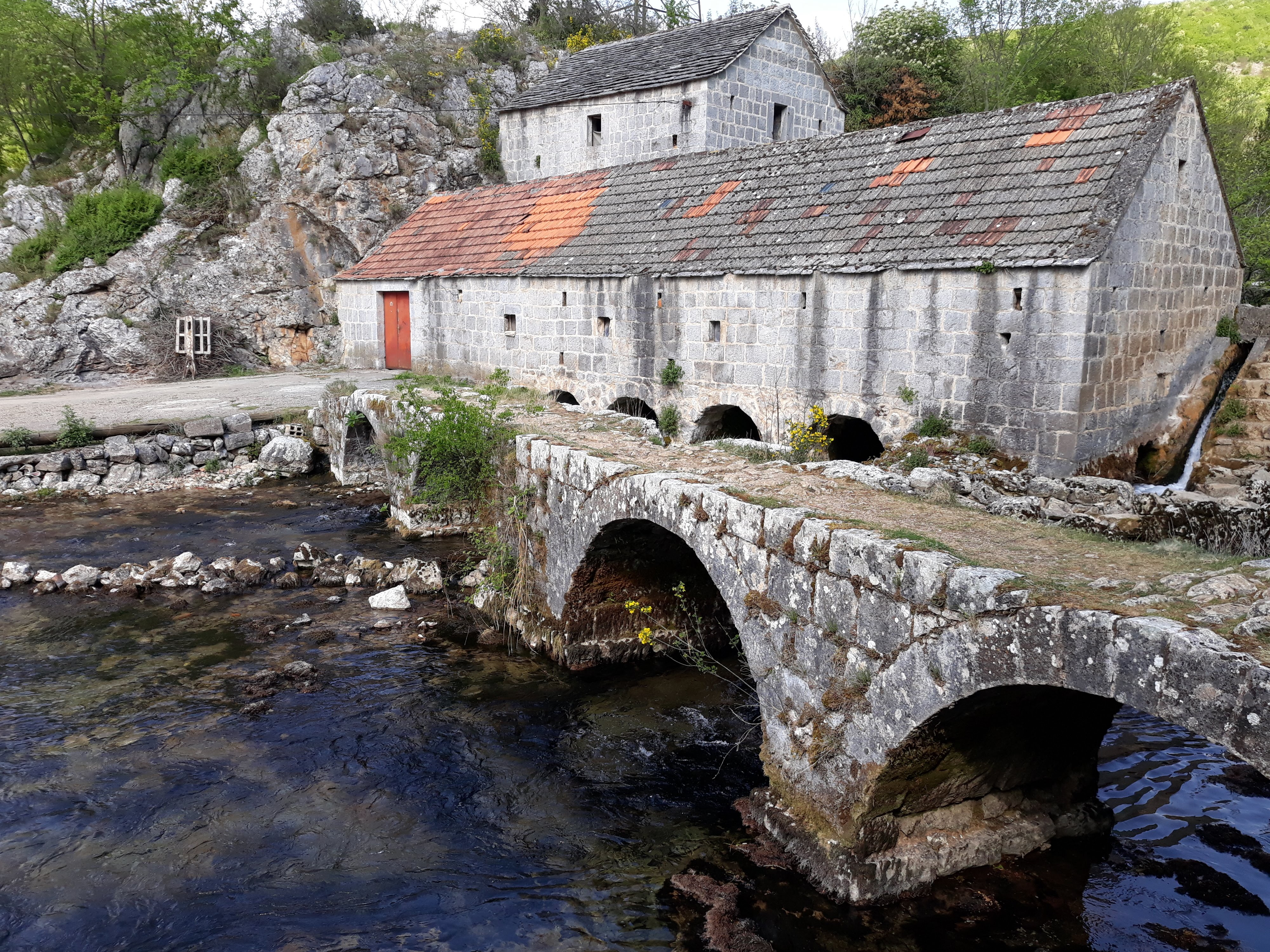
Ćosić family mill

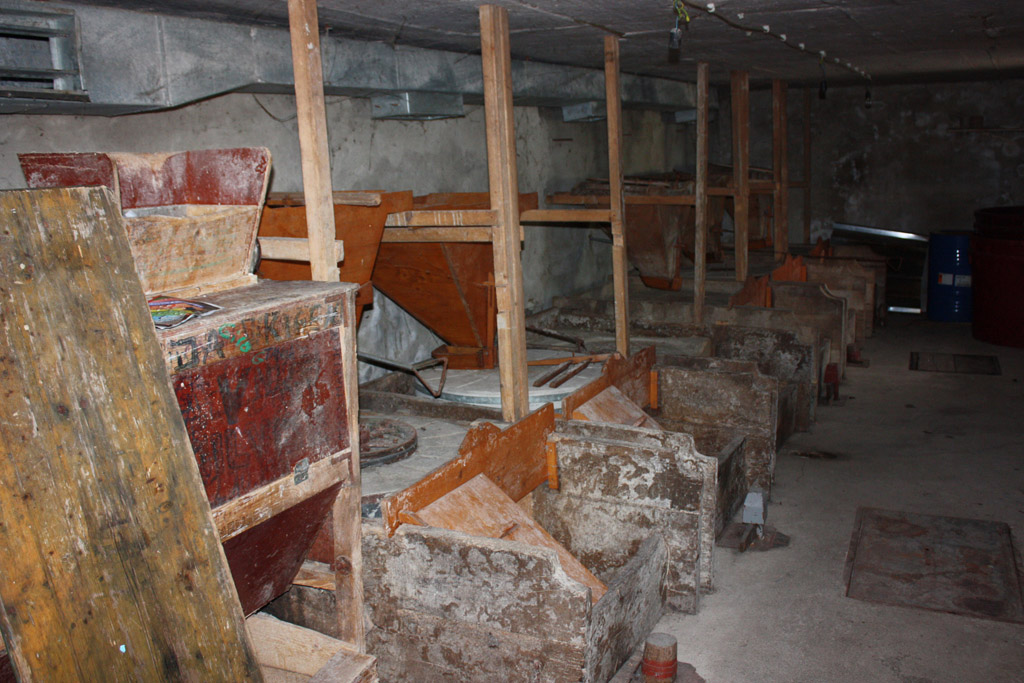
Bugarin family mill

The stone parish church of John the Baptist was built in 1874 on a hill on the Grab River's left bank. It has a single nave, a rectangular apse, and a bell tower with two-light windows and a pyramid roof on its main facade. It is surrounded by an old walled cemetery.
