= Gardun =

- Location within Croatia
- Coordinates: 43°36′42″N 16°43′05″E
- Country: Croatia
- County: Split-Dalmatia
- City: Trilj

Area
  - Total: 4.8 km^{2} (1.9 sq mi)

Population (2021)
  - Total: 68
  - Density: 14/km^{2} (37/sq mi)
- Time zone: UTC+1 (CET)
  - Summer (DST): UTC+2 (CEST)

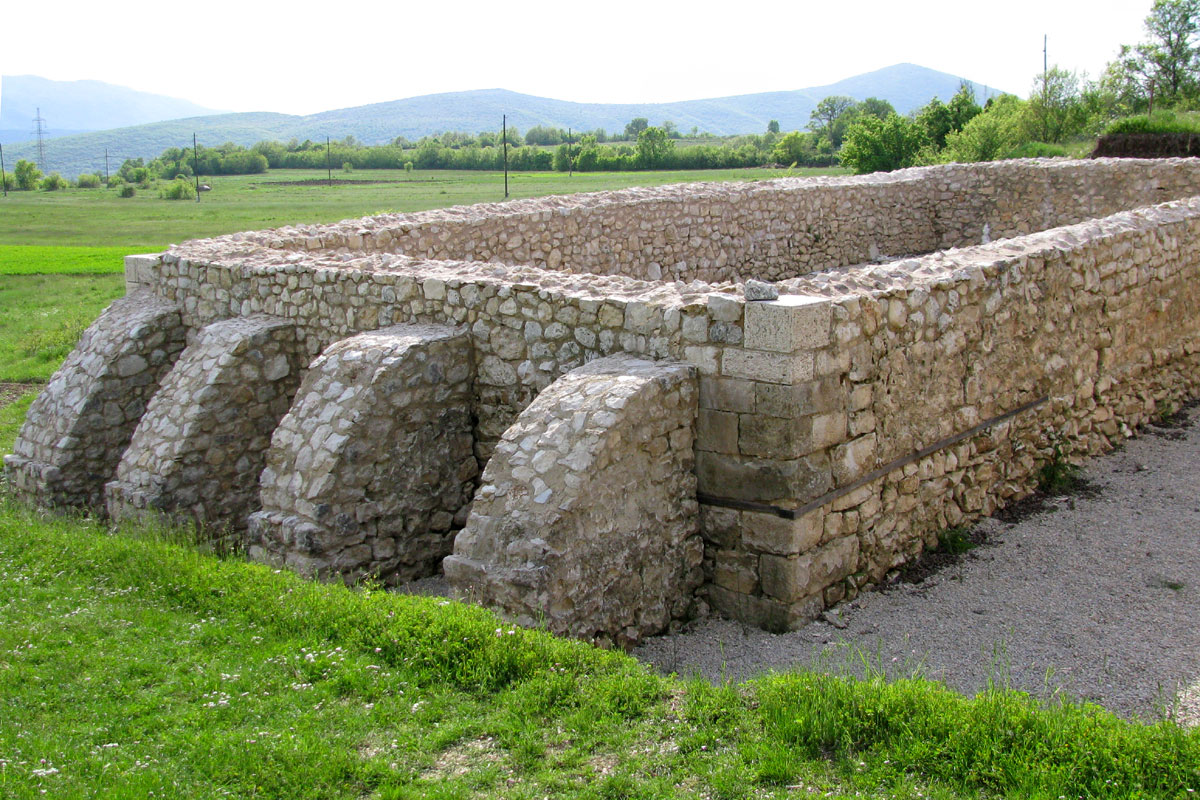
Tilurium remains

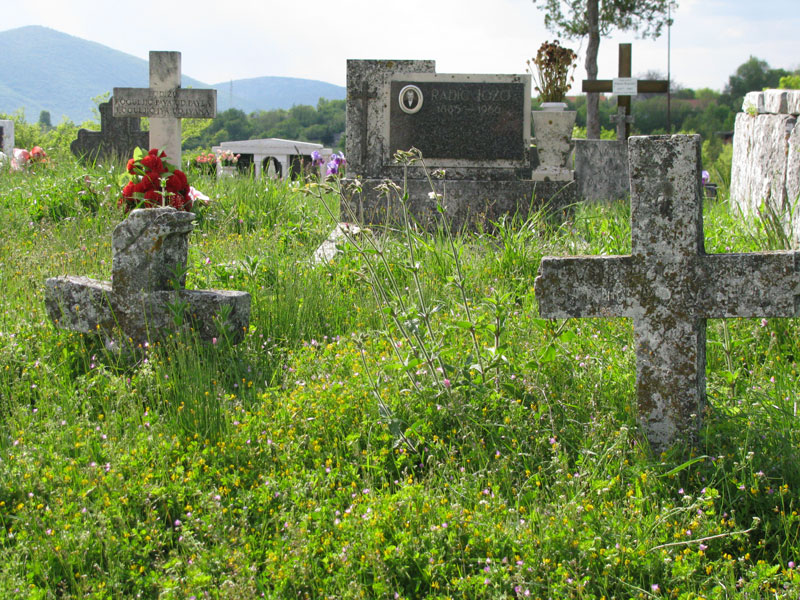
Cemetery, detail

Gardun is a village at the top of the hill of Gardun, just 1 km south of Trilj.

In the 1997, excavations of the remains of legionary fortress of Tilurium started on the southern outskirts of the village.

Tilurium guarded the entrance to the Cetina valley from the south and the approach to the provincial capital at Salona.
