= Vinine, Croatia =

Settlement in Split-Dalmatia County, Croatia

Vinine
- Settlement
- Interactive map of Vinine
- Location within Croatia
- Coordinates: 43°34′08″N 16°47′24″E
- Country: Croatia
- County: Split-Dalmatia
- City: Trilj

Area
  - Total: 5.0 km^{2} (1.9 sq mi)

Population (2021)
  - Total: 16
  - Density: 3.2/km^{2} (8.3/sq mi)
- Time zone: UTC+1 (CET)
  - Summer (DST): UTC+2 (CEST)
- Postal code: 21240 Trilj
- Area code: +385 (0)21

Vinine is a settlement in the City of Trilj in Croatia. In 2021, its population was 16.

== Demographics ==
Vinine: Population trends 1857–2021
v

population				326	197	285		186	153	169	158	153	115	100	35	24	16
	1857	1869	1880	1890	1900	1910	1921	1931	1948	1953	1961	1971	1981	1991	2001	2011	2021

Sources: Croatian Bureau of Statistics publications
