= Trilj =

Town in Dalmatia, Croatia

- Town
- Grad Trilj; Town of Trilj
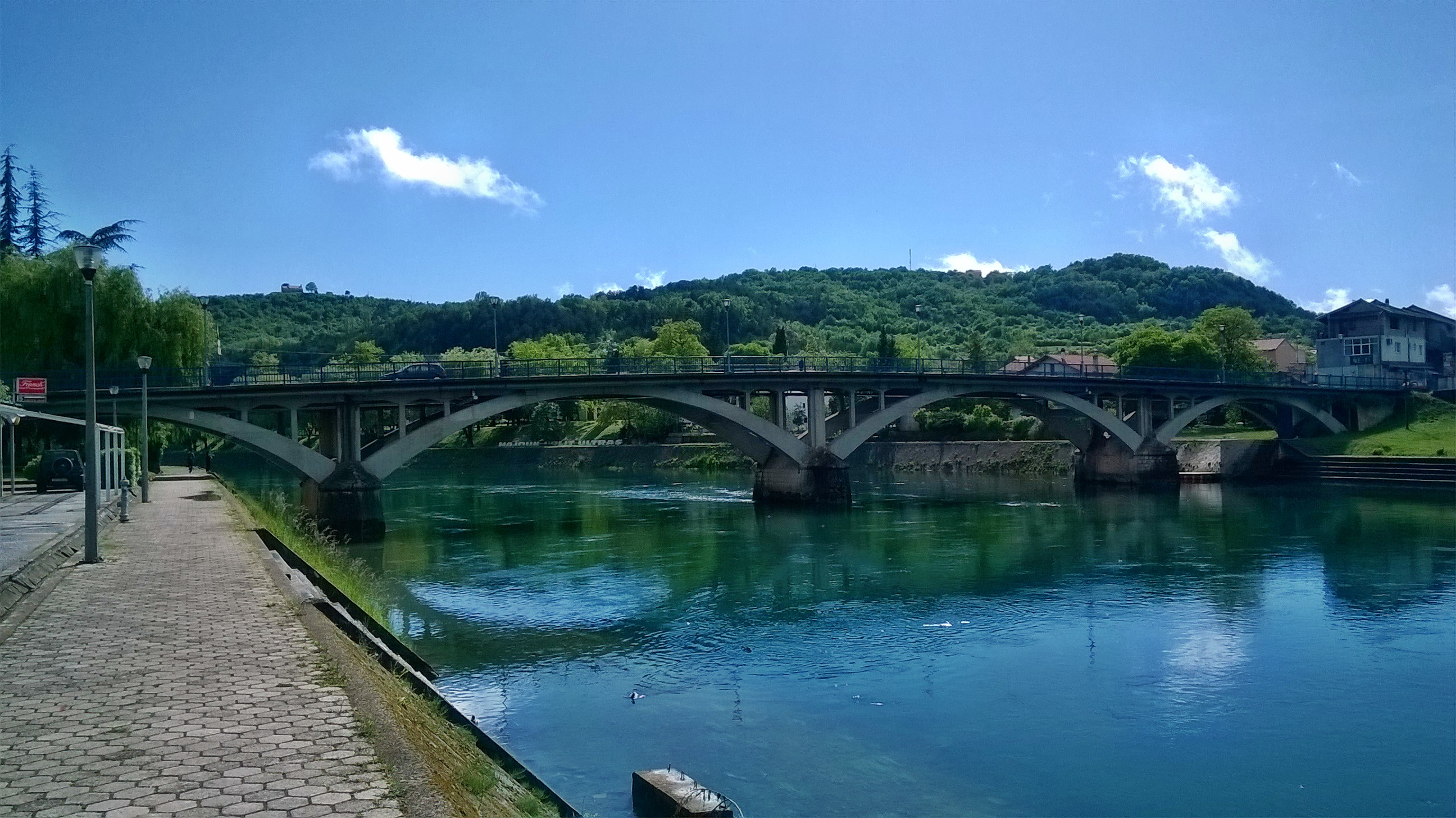
- Cetina river in Trilj

- Location of Trilj in Croatia
- Coordinates: 43.62°N 16.72°E
- Country: Croatia
- Region: Dalmatian Hinterland
- County: Split-Dalmatia County

Government
  - Mayor: Ivan Bugarin (HDZ)

Area
  - Town: 268.0 km^{2} (103.5 sq mi)
  - Urban: 2.2 km^{2} (0.85 sq mi)

Population (2021)
  - Town: 8,182
  - Density: 30.53/km^{2} (79.07/sq mi)
  - Urban: 1,906
  - Urban density: 870/km^{2} (2,200/sq mi)
- Time zone: UTC+1 (CET)
  - Summer (DST): UTC+2 (CEST)
- Postal code: 21240
- Area code: 021
- Website: trilj.hr

Trilj (pronounced [trîːʎ]) is a town and settlement in inland Dalmatia, Croatia. It is located northeast of Split. In 2021, its population was 8182.

Trilj was a traffic hub in Roman times, when a stone bridge Pons Tilurium was built on the Cetina River. A 7th Roman legion military camp called Tilurium was built on a hill above, at the crossroads of Roman roads leading from Salona to Narona and Bosnia.

== History ==
In the area of Trilj there are many archaeological findings dating way back to Mesolithic. The first ethnic group that inhabited this area are the Illyrian tribe Delmatae. They lived in a hill forts along the communication lines that connected their capital Delminium with the Adriatic coast. A hundred and fifty years of fierce fighting against the Romans (165 BC – 9 AD) ended in defeat of Delmati people, after which Romans built the legionary fortress Tilurium.

=== Roman legionary fortress Tilurium ===
At the top of the hill of Gardun, just 1 km (0.6 mi) south of Trilj, remains of a legionary fortress at Tilurium can be found. Tilurium guarded the entrance to the Cetina valley from the south and the approach to the provincial capital of Salona.

=== Čačvina fortress ===
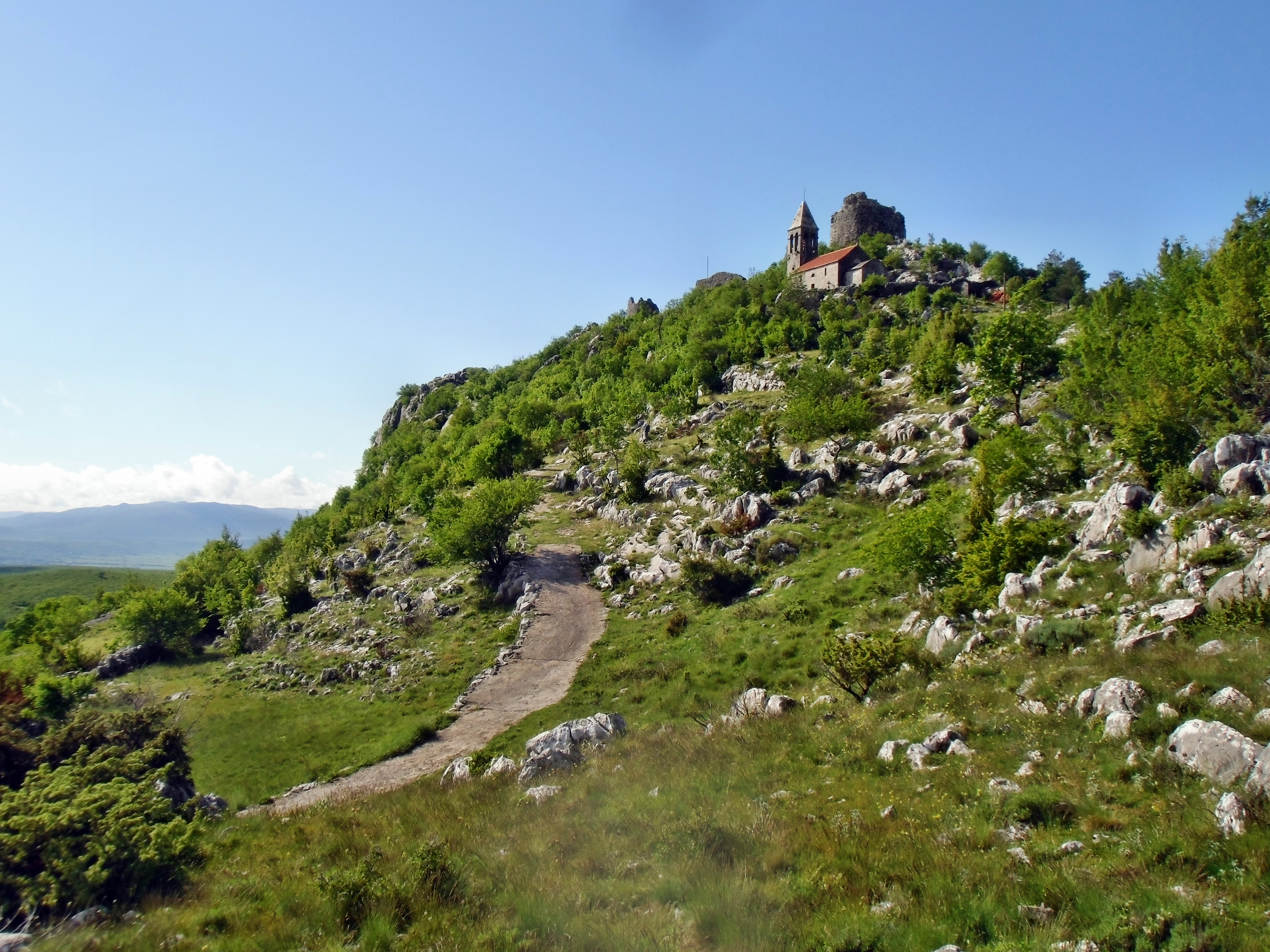
Fort Čačvina

Fort Čačvina is a fortification that guarded approach from Bosnia during the wars with the Ottomans. It is situated 8 kilometres (5 mi) from the town at an altitude of 705 metres (2,313 ft) in a strategic location enabling its crew to oversee traffic of goods through the mountain passage that goes through the Dinaric Alps and leads to Bosnia. The first written record of this fortification dates to 1371.

=== Nutjak fortress ===
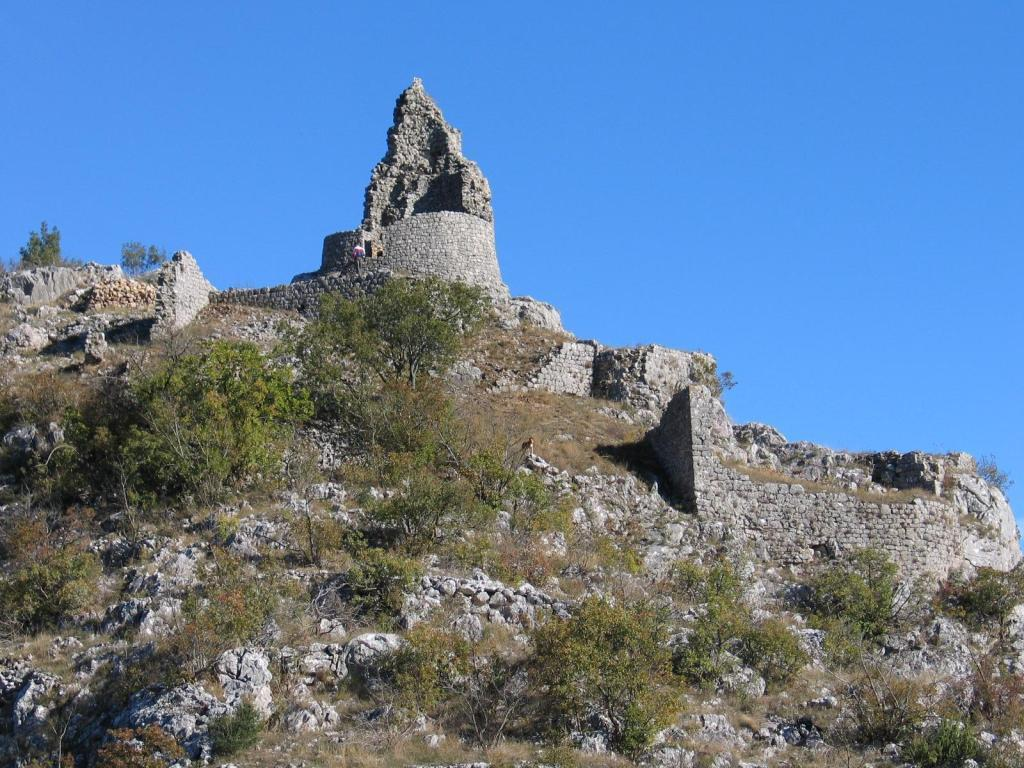
Fort Nutjak

Fort Nutjak is situated on a cliff by the Cetina. The fortress was built in the 15th century by nobleman Žarko Dražojević to protect the land west of the river from Ottoman invasion.

== Population ==
The total population of the municipality in 2011 was 9,109, with 2,076 in Trilj itself and the rest in small villages. The list of settlements was as follows:

- Bisko, population 395
- Budimiri, population 106
- Čačvina, population 93
- Čaporice, population 389
- Gardun, population 83
- Grab, population 546
- Jabuka, population 306
- Kamensko, population 107
- Košute, population 1,740
- Krivodol, population 2
- Ljut, population 5
- Nova Sela, population 139
- Podi, population 13
- Rože, population 32
- Strizirep, population 31
- Strmendolac, population 181
- Tijarica, population 374
- Trilj, population 2,076
- Ugljane, population 398
- Vedrine, population 851
- Velić, population 288
- Vinine, population 24
- Vojnić Sinjski, population 577
- Voštane, population 42
- Vrabač, population 218
- Vrpolje, population 93
Town of Trilj: Population trends 1857–2021
v

population	7116	8078	8555	10060	11475	11903	12337	12972	12586	13338	13507	13529	13394	13894	10799	9109	8182
	1857	1869	1880	1890	1900	1910	1921	1931	1948	1953	1961	1971	1981	1991	2001	2011	2021

Sources: Croatian Bureau of Statistics publications

== Culture ==
=== Trilj Museum ===
Museum was found in 1996 for the purpose of presentation of artifacts from nearby archaeological site (Roman legionary fortress Tilurium). Along with archaeological artifacts in a part of the museum ethnographic collection from Trilj and surrounding area is presented.

== Tourism ==
Trilj and surrounding area are popular tourist area, becoming more popular on annual basis. The area has rich history and offers great opportunities for outdoor activities and adventure Holidays. Surrounding is dominated, on one side by Cetina river that is very diverse with white waters and calm parts, and by mountains of dinaric alps on the other side. Some of the activities include Cetina river fishing, canoeing, rafting, canyoning, horseback riding, cycling, and hiking.
