= Čitluk, Sinj =

Čitluk
- Interactive map of Čitluk
- Location within Croatia
- Coordinates: 43°44′30″N 16°38′38″E
- Country: Croatia
- County: Split-Dalmatia
- City: Sinj

Area
  - Total: 3.7 km^{2} (1.4 sq mi)

Population (2021)
  - Total: 462
  - Density: 120/km^{2} (320/sq mi)
- Time zone: UTC+1 (CET)
  - Summer (DST): UTC+2 (CEST)
- Postal code: 21230 Sinj
- Area code: +385 (0)21

Čitluk is a village situated north of the town of Sinj, Split-Dalmatia County, Croatia, and is one of the settlements within the municipality. In 2021, its population was 462.

== Geography ==
Čitluk is nestled between the Cetina River and the neighboring villages of Hrvace, Karakašica, Jasensko, and Glavice. Its territory stretches out over the hills and valleys, and follows the boundary of the Hrvatačko polje. Lying directly opposite the river is the village of Bajagić.

== History ==
The location of modern-day Čitluk was occupied by the Roman settlement known as Colonia Claudia Aequum. Its origins date to the 1st century, potentially as early as Emperor Augustus's rule, but certainly by Emperor Claudius's era. It held the status of an oppidum civium Romanorum, signifying a settlement of Roman citizens. Among the many valuable items unearthed there, a statue of Hecate and a sculpted head of Heracles are especially notable. Both artifacts are kept in the archaeological collection maintained by the Franciscan monastery in Sinj. Aequum was the birthplace of the Roman general Gnaeus Minicius Faustinus Sextus Iulius Severus, who famously crushed the Jewish revolt and destroyed Jerusalem in 135 AD.

== Demographics ==
Čitluk: Population trends 1857–2021
v

population	108		99	136	243	371			500	516	581	611	616	514	552	488	462
	1857	1869	1880	1890	1900	1910	1921	1931	1948	1953	1961	1971	1981	1991	2001	2011	2021

Note:In 1869, 1921 and 1931 the population data are contained in the data for the village of Karakašica, as well as part of the data for 1857, 1880, 1890, and 1900. Sources: Croatian Bureau of Statistics publications
