= Obrovac =

Obrovac may refer to:

== Places ==
- Obrovac, Croatia, a town near Zadar
- Obrovac, Serbia, a village near Bačka Palanka
- Obrovac, Bosnia and Herzegovina, a village near Banja Luka
- Obrovac Sinjski, a village near Sinj, Croatia

== People ==
- Ivan Obrovac (born 1986), Serbian football midfielder
- Mike Obrovac (1955–2018), American gridiron football player
- Nikola Obrovac (born 1998), Croatian swimmer
- Tamara Obrovac (born 1962), Croatian ethno jazz singer, flutist, songwriter and composer

== See also ==
- Obrov (disambiguation)
