= Sinjska alka =

Equestrian competition in Sinj, Croatia

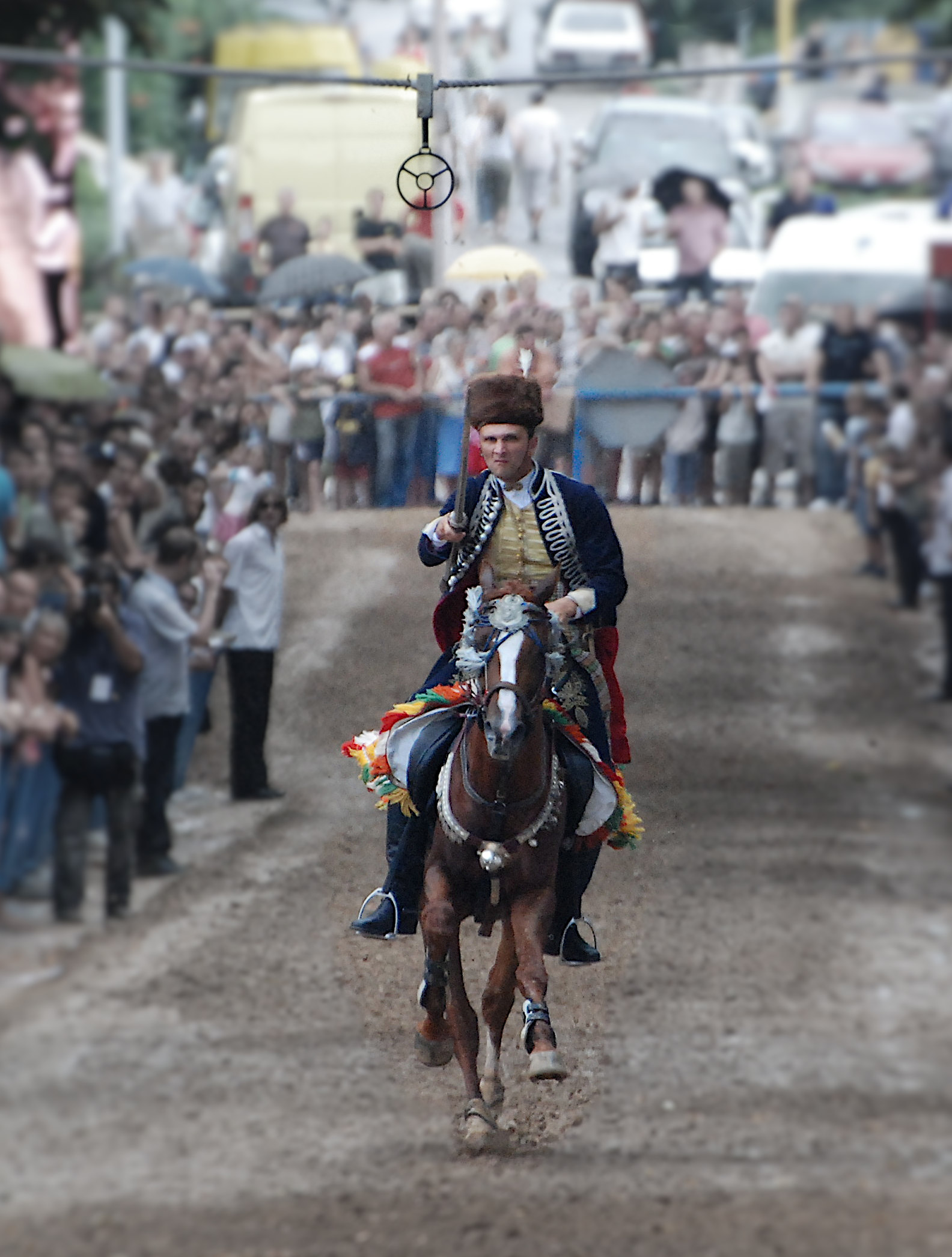
- Date: First Sunday in August
- Frequency: Annual
- Locations: Sinj, Croatia
- Inaugurated: 1715

Sinjska Alka, a knights' tournament in Sinj
- UNESCO Intangible Cultural Heritage
- Country: Croatia
- Reference: 00357
- Region: Europe and North America

Inscription history
- Inscription: 2010 (5th session)
- List: Representative

The Sinjska alka (Croatian pronunciation: [sîːɲskaː âːlka]) is an equestrian competition held in the Croatian town of Sinj. It commemorates a Croatian–Venetian victory in the Ottoman–Venetian war in the night of 14 August 1715, in which around 700 professional Venetian soldiers and 100 locals defended Sinj against an Ottoman army led by Mehmed-paša Ćelić of at least 40,000. Because of this victory, the Venetians retained control over Sinj and integrated it into the Venetian Dalmatia in accordance to the terms of the Treaty of Passarowitz signed in 1718.

The people of Sinj believed that the Lady of Sinj miraculously drove away Ottomans, thus helping them to defend their town. On the national holiday of the Assumption of Mary (Velika Gospa) on 15 August in honor of Lady of Sinj, a procession is organised, during which horsemen in full regalia (Alkari) parade a painting of Our Lady of Sinj throughout the town streets.

The Alka itself is an equestrian competition in which various horsemen riding at full gallop aim their lances at a hanging metal ring (alka), and are awarded points according to which sector of the ring they are able to pierce. In 2010, the Alka was inscribed in the UNESCO Intangible Cultural Heritage Lists.

== Objective ==
Scoring in alka: bottom segments are worth 1 point, top segment is worth 2 points, and the central ring is worth 3 points.

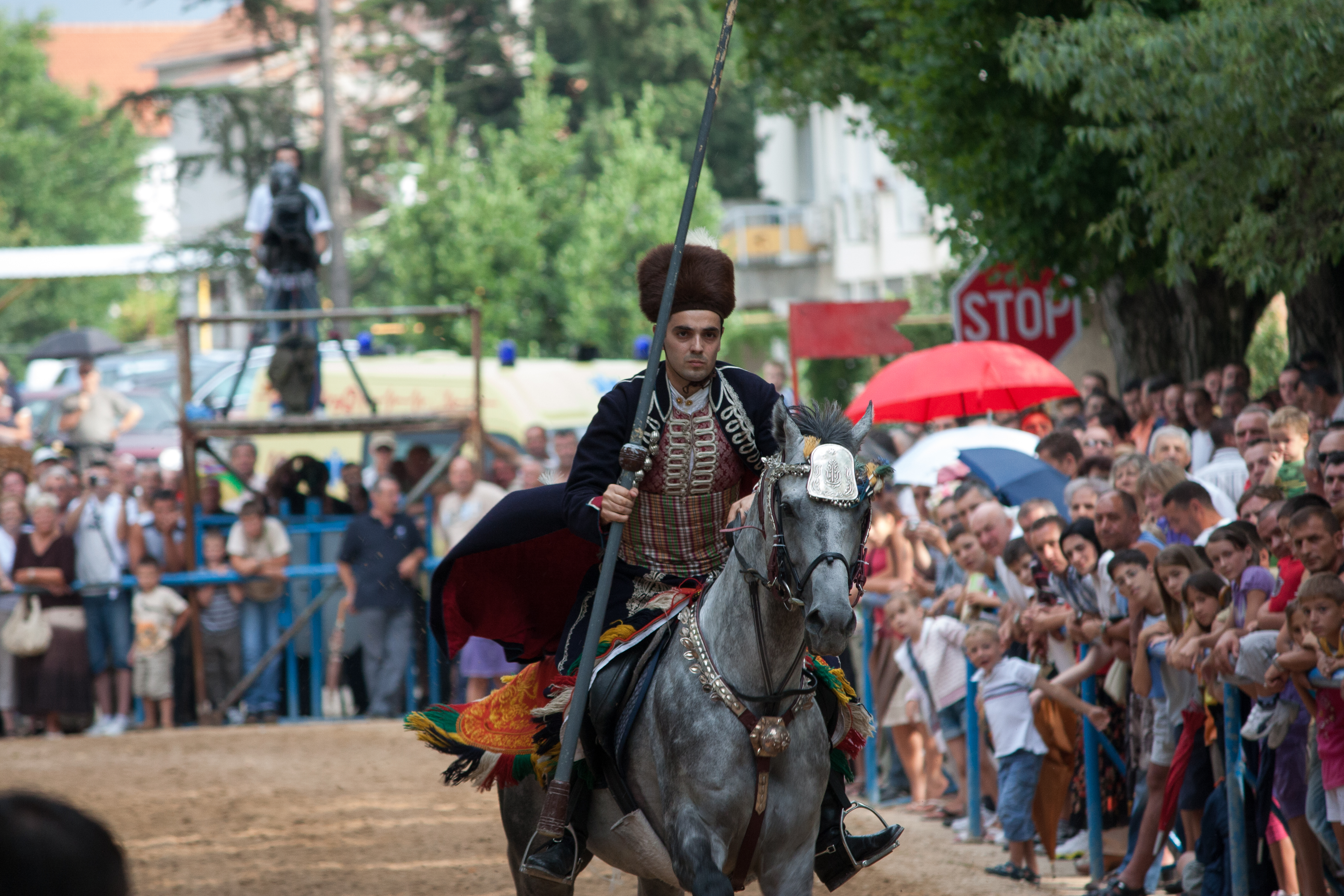
Alkar Ante Zorica, 4-time winner

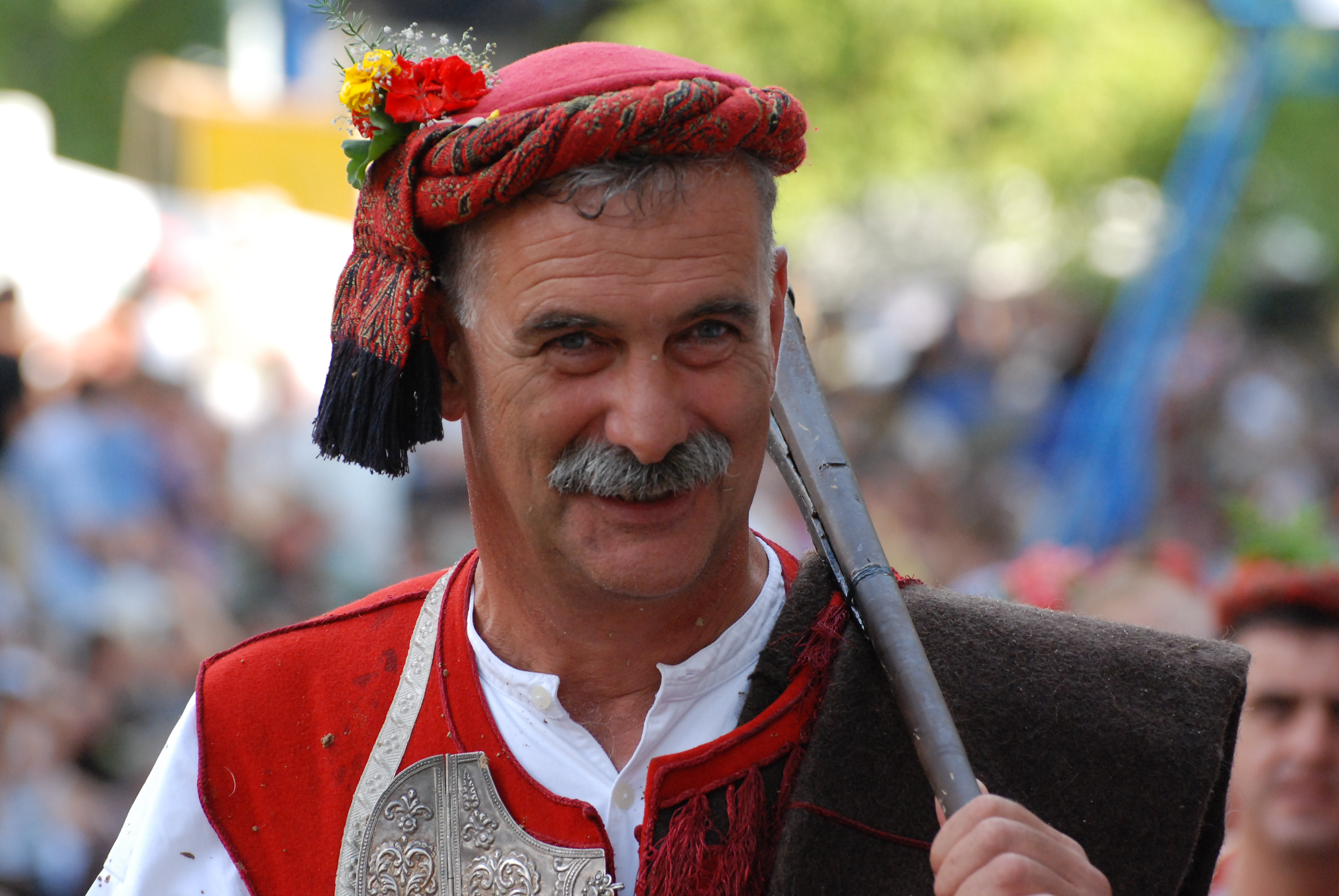
Alkar's squire (alkarski momak)

Alka is the name of the target used in the tournament; it is made of two concentric rings connected by three equally spaced bars. The target is hung on a rope in the middle of the race track. The contestant (Alkar) rides his horse, in full gallop, down the track and tries to hit the central ring with his spear. Depending on which part of the alka he hits, he receives from 1 to 3 points, and no points if he misses. If, however, the alkar sends the alka in the air away from its holder and hits any part of it on its way down, he will be awarded 1-3 points for a target hit and an additional three points, thus increasing the maximum to 6 points in one run. The contest consists of three rounds.

== Participants ==
Only men born in Cetinska krajina (area along the valley of river Cetina in the vicinity of Sinj) can take part in the Alka. It is considered a great privilege to participate in the tournament. The vojvoda ("Duke") of Alka is a ceremonial title representing the commander of the Alkars. It is a great honour to become the alkar vojvoda, and only the most notable men from Cetinska krajina become one. The costumes worn by the alkar men are the same that were worn by the warriors in the 18th century. Each alkar is accompanied by a squire (alkarski momak) who is dressed in a folk costume of old, wearing several kinds of weapons (yatagan, flintlock musket and rifle, mace, shield). Alkars ride horses bred, kept or maintained almost exclusively in Alkars' Stud.

== History ==
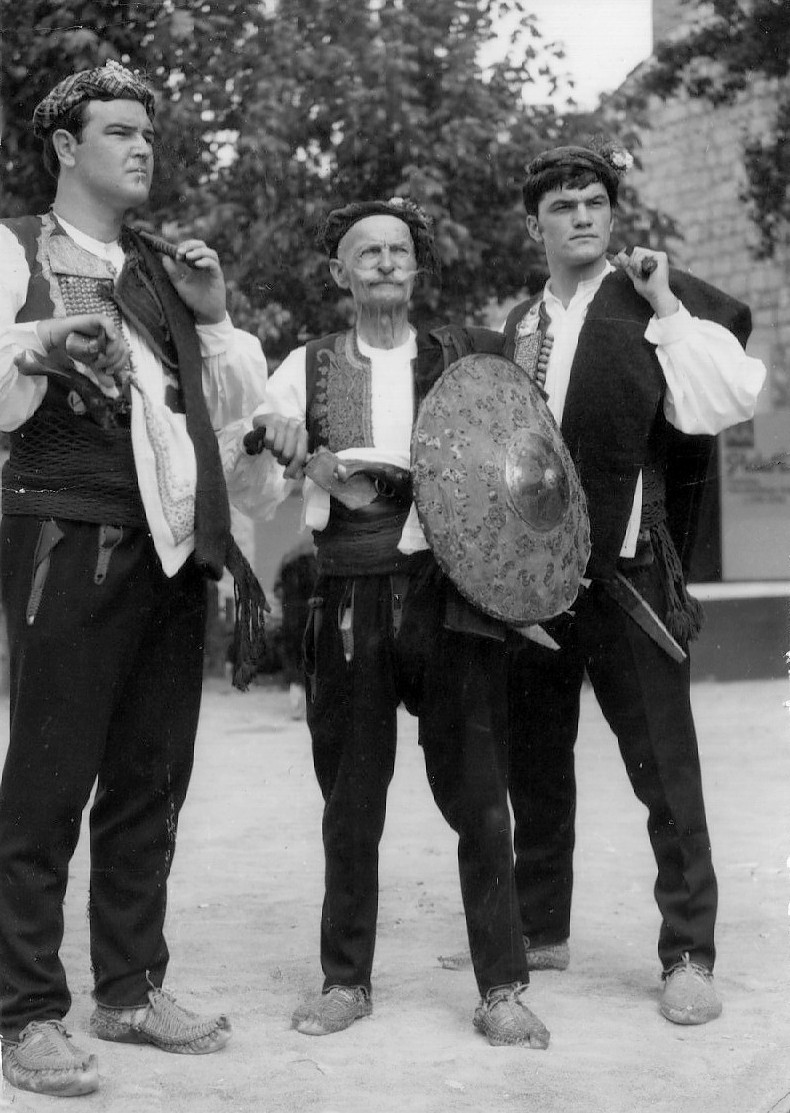
Shield bearer (štitonoša) and two mace-bearers (buzdovandžije) in August 1969

Sinjska Alka was created in the early 18th century as a continuation of knightly competitions that were held across the Venetian Dalmatia: Zadar, Imotski and Makarska. The oldest written mention of Alka are in the three sonnets and an ode written by the Italian poet Julije Bajamonti in 1784. The oldest official file about Alka is a letter of the first Austrian Commissioner for the Austria Dalmatia Count Raymond Thurn that he wrote to the commander of Sinj Josip Grabovac on 10 February 1798. In the letter Count Thurn informs Commander Grabovac that the Palatine Commission from Vienna "approved further maintenance of Alka in Sinj on the last day of the carnival".

In the past Alka was organised at a different time than today, occasionally twice a year (in years: 1798 (the last day of the carnival and on 9 May) and in 1818 (on 15 May and 6 July). In 1834 it was organised on 9 February, in 1838 on 19 April and in 1855 on 4 October because of cholera. Alka is organised regularly on 18 August which is the birthday of Emperor Franz Joseph, since 1849, as determined by the Statute of 1902. Since then, Alka is organised in August (and under the new rules), in the first third of the month, so that Bara, Čoja and Alka could be organised in the same month.

In 1818, during his trip through Dalmatia, the Emperor Francis II visited Sinj, and the locals organized a special Alka in his honor. The Emperor awarded the winner a brilliant ring worth 800 forints. Also, by 1818, Vienna was rewarding the winner a prize of 100 florins, and this was probably main reason for the continuation of this knightly tournament. When the Emperor Franz Joseph rose to power in 1848 he established the award in the amount of 100 forints. From 1902 to 1914 prize awarded to winner was 4000 crowns, and from 1914 to 1918 it was 600 crowns.

Alka was repeatedly organised during the visits of rulers or other very important people. On March 28, 1842, Alka was organised in honor of the Austrian Archduke Albrecht during his visit to Sinj, and in the same year on 22 October in honor of the Austrian Archduke Franz Karl. On 18 May 1875, Emperor Franz Joseph visited Sinj. In his honor people of Sinj organised extraordinary solemn Alka. The winner was Mate Bonić. The Emperor awarded him a gold ring.

Alka was organised four times outside of Sinj: in 1832 in Split, in 1922 in Belgrade, 1946 in Zagreb and in 2017 in Vukovar. Vicko Grabovac was the longest-running Alka Duke with 28 commands over Alka festivities (1908–1936). Bruno Vuletić was Alka Duke 21 times (1964–1985) and Ivan Vuletić 17 times (1872–1894).

== Rules ==
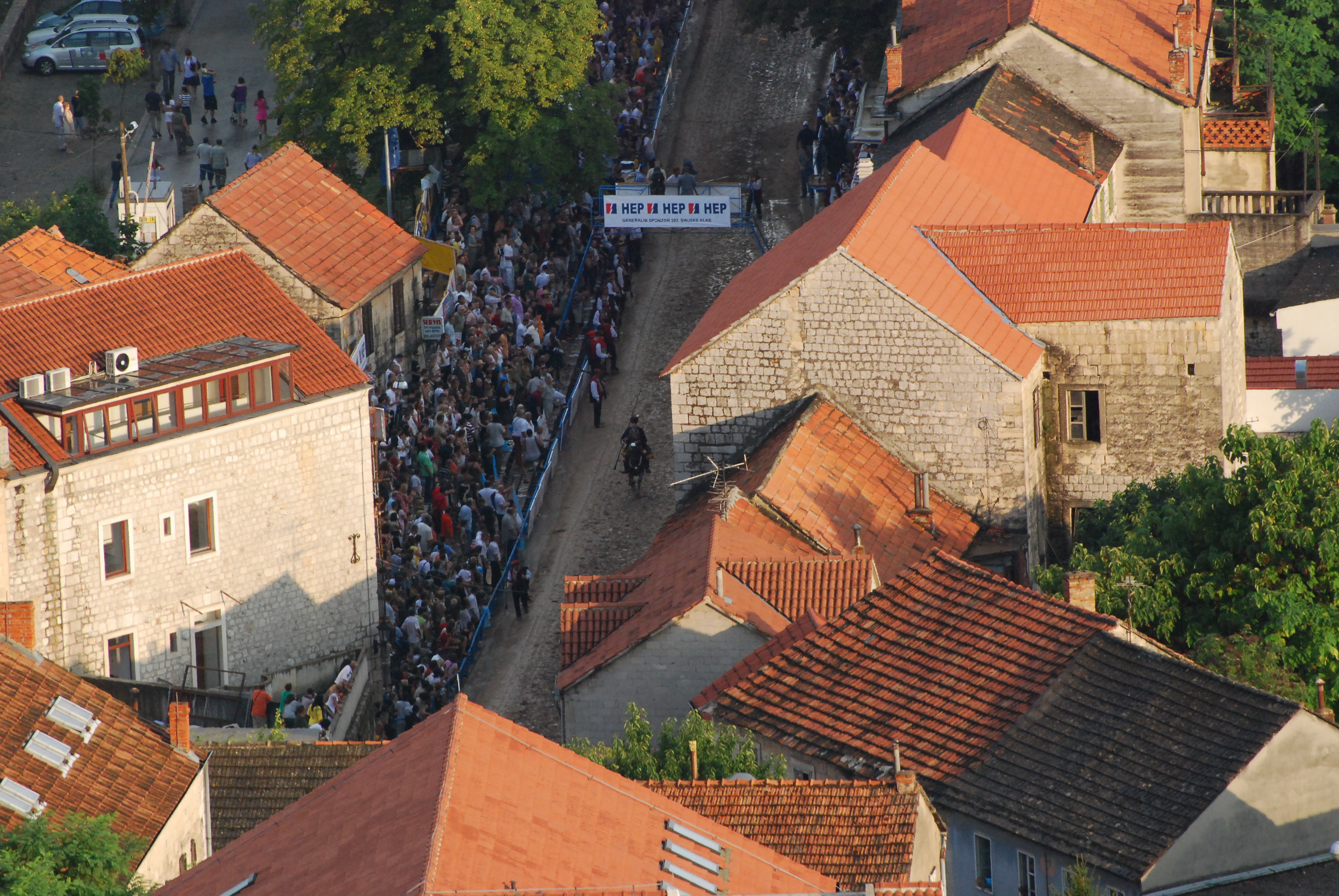
Alka 160 m long racecourse in the center of Sinj

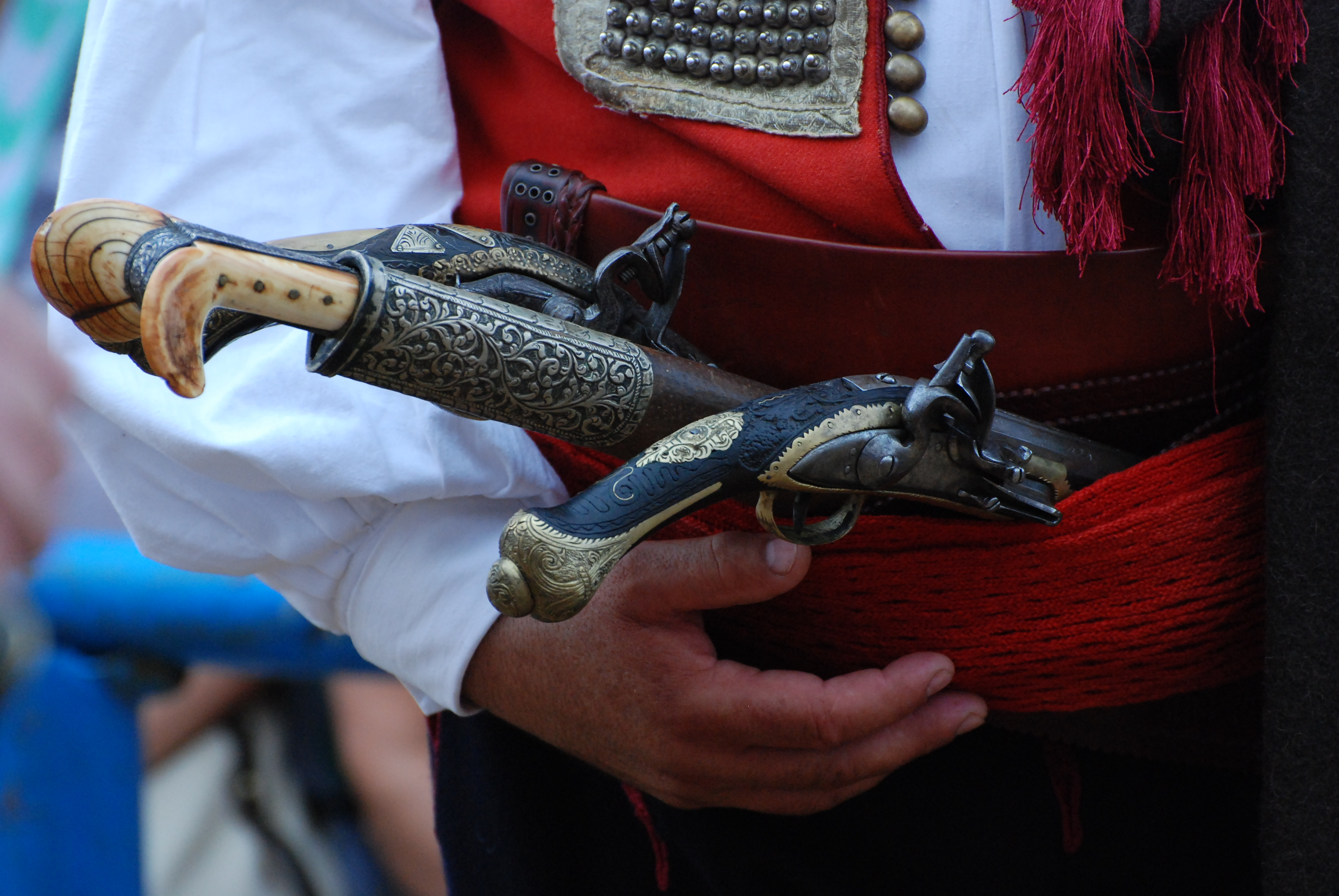
Detail of a squire's dress and weaponry: yatagan and two muskets.

Sinjska alka is an individual equestrian competition. It is held on Sunday of a first full weekend in August every year. At least 11 and at most 17 horseback riders, Alkars can participate. The Alkar has to pass the racecourse length 160 m in full gallop in less than 12 seconds and try to hit the center of a small iron ring called alka. The alka is a ring made of two concentric wrought-iron hoops connected by three equally spaced spokes. The inner ring has a diameter of 35 mm, and the outer of 132 mm. The rims and spokes of alka are 6.6 mm thick and have a pointed edge on the side facing the Alkar. A spring clip on top of the outer ring is used to hang it on the rope. The alka is at 3.32 m height, measured from its center to the ground. The Custodian of the Alka (namještač alke) and his assistant have the responsibility for the proper placement and height of the Alka; the Custodian steadies the pendant ring with a 3.22 m long stick and simultaneously controls the height of it, while his assistant tightens the rope on which the ring hangs.

The aim of the game is to collect as many points in three attempts. During the race, all equipment has to remain on the horse and Alkar, and not one single piece may be allowed to fall off. If this happens without the Alkar being aware of it, he must subsequently seek permission from the Alka Duke for another attempt. However, if an Alkar notices that any item of equipment has fallen off, he must run through with his "spear lowered" without hitting the Alka.

== Museum ==
The Museum of Alka exhibits the costumes, equipment and weapons used by the participants of the Sinjska alka, and preserves archival material related to the history of Sinj and the Cetina region. It is located in the restored Kvartiri complex in Sinj, in a building constructed in 1760 that served as a cavalry barracks during Venetian rule in Dalmatia. The exhibition presents various elements of the tournament in its multi-layered historical contexts, and includes digitalized archives of statutes as well as video recordings of past tournaments and processions. Among the exhibits are a life-size depiction of the Alka procession by sculptor Hrvoje Dumančić, and a reconstruction of the 1715 Battle of Sinj. The exhibition design was created by Nikolina Jelavić Mitrović, while the concept of the permanent exhibition was developed by Joško Belamarić and Ante Milošević. For many years, the Croatian Conservation Institute worked on the restoration of the original costumes, equipment and weapons, as well as on producing their replicas. The museum was officially opened on 8 August 2015 during the 300th anniversary celebrations of the Alka. In 2025, the museum received the European Heritage Award / Europa Nostra Award; the jury noted that the museum expands a one-day event into a sustainable model of awareness-raising and education throughout the year, which is significant for the local community that preserves the tradition.

== See also ==
- National symbols of Croatia
