= Sinjsko Polje =

Karstic field in Croatia

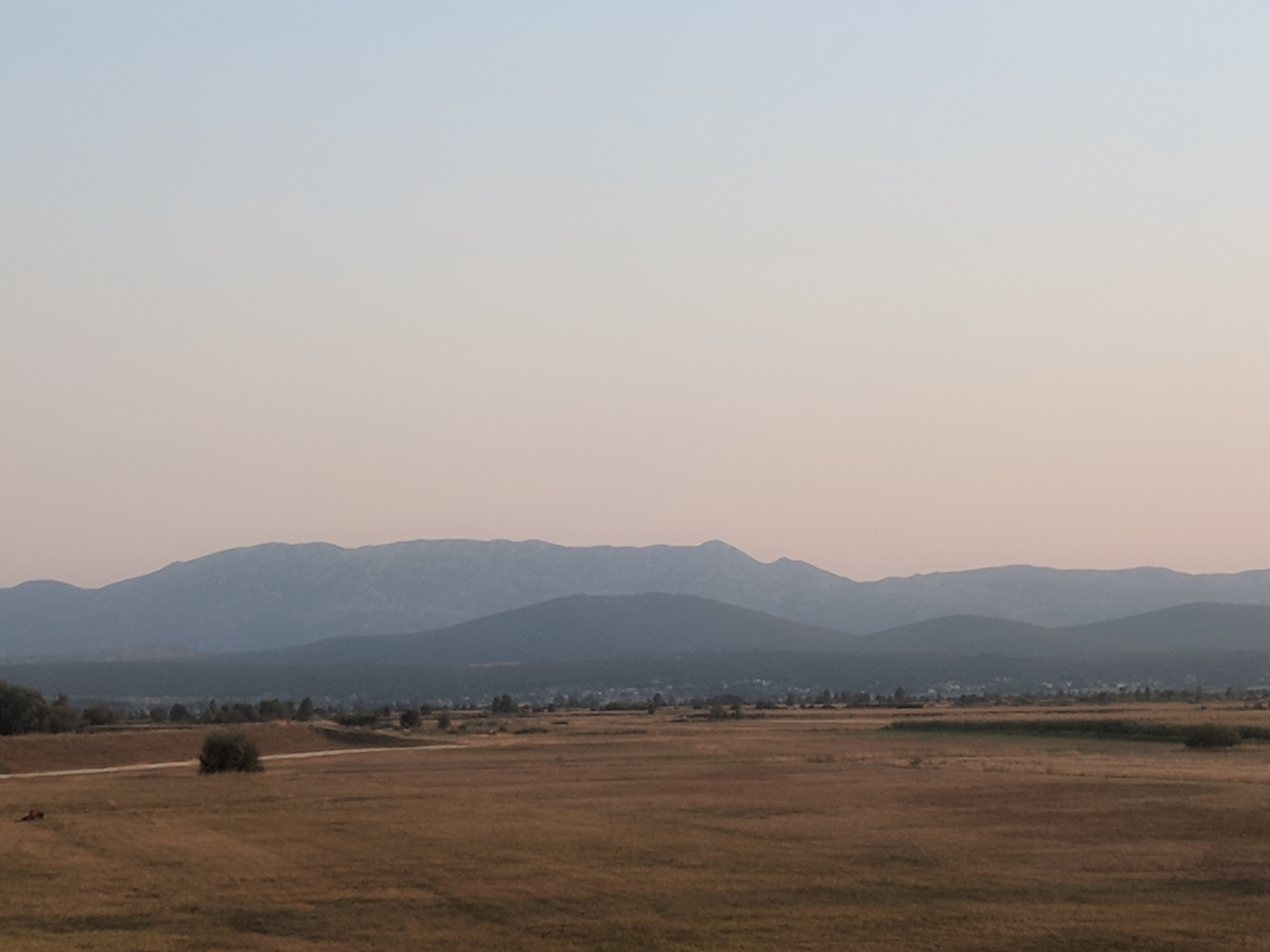
- View from the Cetina River bank

- Location within Croatia
- Floor elevation: 295–301 m (968–988 ft)
- Area: 64 km^{2} (25 mi^{2})

Geography
- Country: Croatia
- State/Province: Split-Dalmatia County
- Population center: Sinj
- Coordinates: 43.68°N 16.7°E
- Mountain range: Dinaric Alps
- Rivers: Cetina

Location
- Interactive map of Sinjsko Polje

Sinjsko Polje (lit. 'Field of Sinj') is a polje (karstic field) in the inner Dalmatia region of Croatia, the fifth largest in Croatia, covering an area of 64 square kilometres (25 sq mi). The Cetina River flows along the edge of the field, and receives a number of tributaries.

The field is 12 km long and up to 7 km wide. It is enclosed by the slopes of Visoka, Svilaja, Dinara, and Kamešnica from west to northeast, and some lower hills to the southwest. In the past, the field was periodically flooded because of the abundant flow of water from the river and numerous springs, but the construction of drainage canals and interventions on the Cetina, with the regulated artificial Peruća Lake located upstream, enabled the development of agriculture. The canals are in total 150 km long; even though around 20 km^{2} could be irrigated, only a quarter of this area is systematically irrigated. Conditions for a stable, high-yielding and crop-intensive production are yet to be achieved.

The climate is Mediterranean-mountainous, with strong winter gusts of dry and cold air, frequent temperature inversions, summer droughts, and occasional heavy rainfall.

There are several fruitful archaeological sites from the Neolithic period along the Cetina at Sinjsko Polje. Remains of huts and valuable, rare finds have been found, which show that the Cetina River was an important area in the interior of the Adriatic hinterland since prehistoric times.

Several settlements are located along the edge of the field: Sinj as the center of the region of Cetinska Krajina, Glavice, Brnaze, Hrvace, Otok, Trilj, Košute, Turjaci.

The field hosts a grass strip that was once the main airport for the city of Split. Nowadays, the airport is used for gliding and parachuting.

== Gallery ==
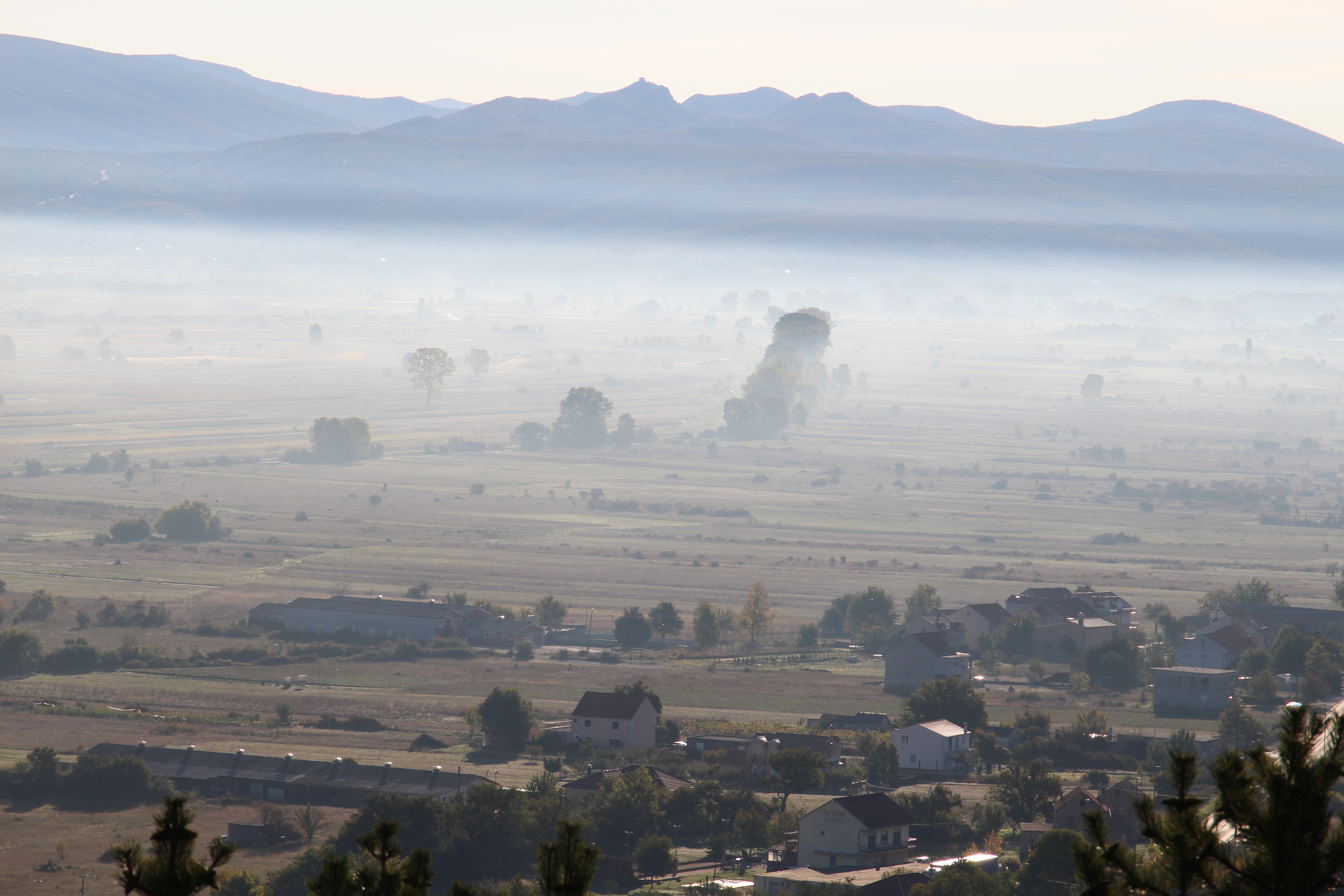
Morning mist over Sinjsko polje

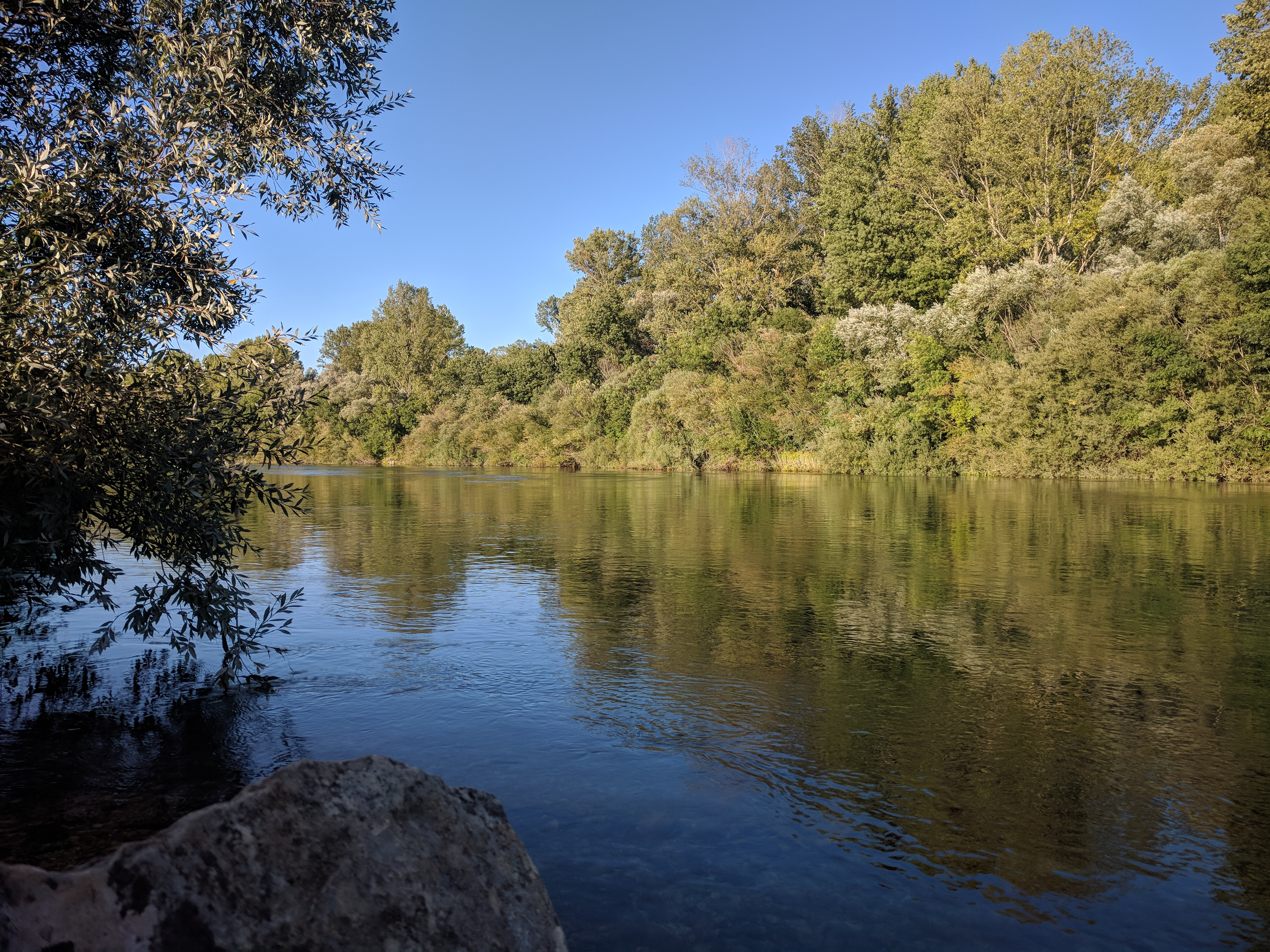
Cetina River at Sinjsko polje
