= Sinj =

Town in Split-Dalmatia, Croatia

- Town
- Grad Sinj; Town of Sinj
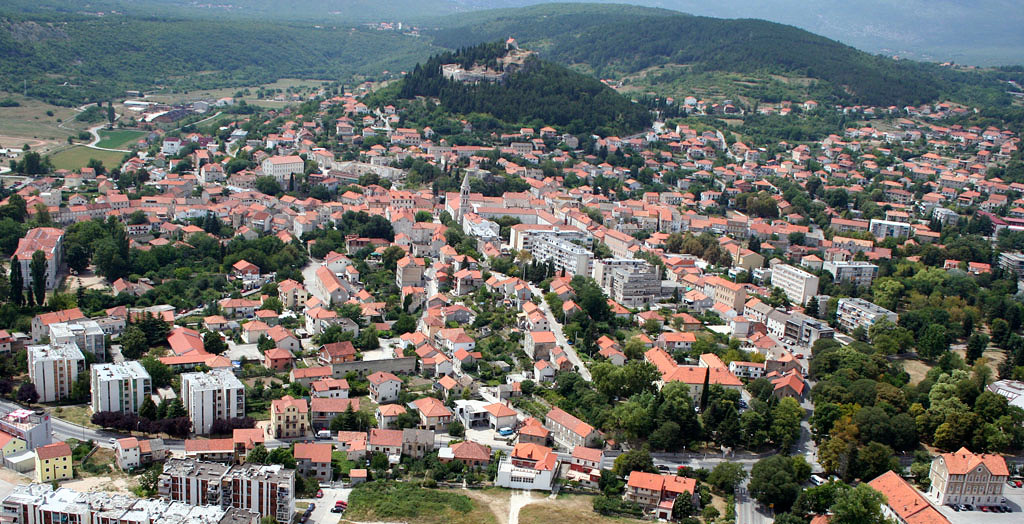
- Aerial view of Sinj

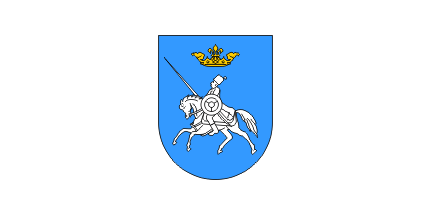
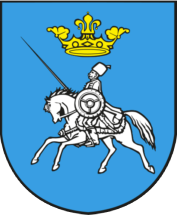
- Flag Seal
- Interactive map of Sinj
- Location of Sinj in Croatia
- Coordinates: 43°42′9″N 16°38′17″E
- Country: Croatia
- Region: Dalmatian Hinterland
- County: Split-Dalmatia County

Government
  - Type: Mayor-Council
  - Mayor: Miro Bulj (Most)
  - Town Council: 19 members: MOST (8); HDZ (7); Independent list of Stipislav Jadrijević (3); SDP (1)

Area
  - Town: 193.4 km^{2} (74.7 sq mi)
  - Urban: 7.7 km^{2} (3.0 sq mi)
- Elevation: 326 m (1,070 ft)

Population (2021)
  - Town: 23,452
  - Density: 121.3/km^{2} (314.1/sq mi)
  - Urban: 10,771
  - Urban density: 1,400/km^{2} (3,600/sq mi)
- Time zone: UTC+1 (CET)
  - Summer (DST): UTC+2 (CEST)
- Postal code: 21230
- Area code: +385 021
- Vehicle registration: ST
- Website: sinj.hr

Sinj (Croatian: [sîːɲ]) is a town in the continental part of Split-Dalmatia County, Croatia. As of the 2021 census, the population was 23,500 people, of which 10,800 inhabited its urban core.

Sinj is known for a knights' tournament of Sinjska alka, which has been held since the beginning of the 18th century as a sign of victory over the Ottoman Empire, and for the shrine of Our Lady of Sinj. The urban center of Sinj is a protected cultural heritage site.

== Geography ==
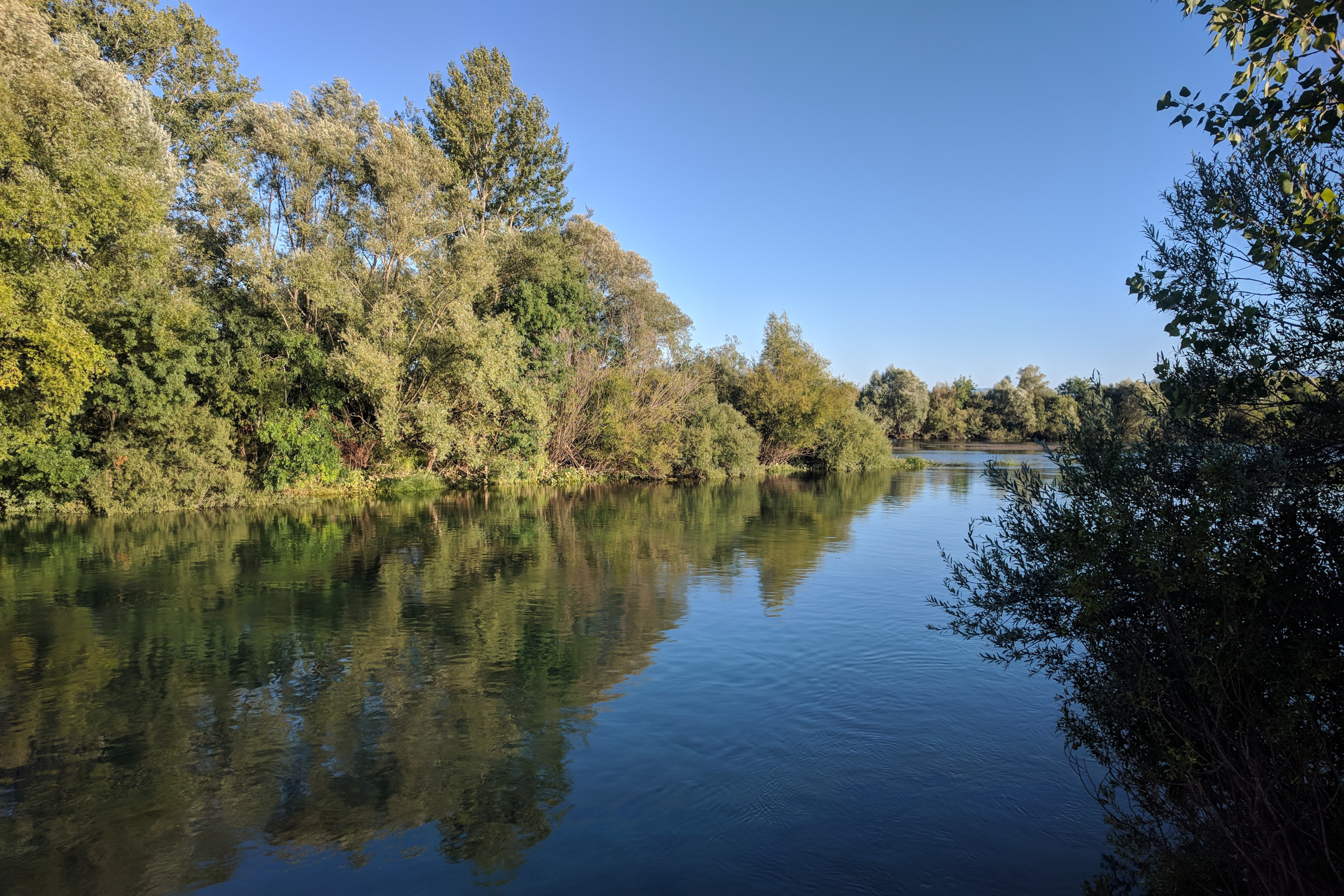
Cetina river near Sinj

Sinj is located in Dalmatia, in the region historically known as Cetinska Krajina, a group of settlements situated around a fertile karstic field of Sinjsko Polje (300 m AMSL), once shaped by the flood waters of the Cetina river. The field lies between the mountains of Svilaja (1508 m), Dinara (1913 m), Kamešnica (1855 m) and Visoka (890 m). Further south, the mountain Mosor (1339 m) separates Sinj from the Adriatic sea.

== Climate ==
The mountains give Sinj its specific sub-Mediterranean climate, with a total annual rainfall of about 1300 mm. Winters are wet and cold, especially in the mornings, when temperatures can drop below -10 °C, whereas summers are hot and dry, with temperatures surpassing +40 °C. Partly due to its location in a valley, Sinj is one of the coldest Dalmatian towns in winter and one of the warmest in summer.

Since records began in 1950, the highest temperature recorded at the local weather station was 40.5 °C (104.9 °F), on 3 August 2017. The coldest temperature was −24.2 °C (−11.6 °F), on 17 February 1956.

== History ==
=== Prehistory ===
Several stone weapons and tools discovered in the region attest to the area's population dating back to the Mesolithic. Many caves and dugouts contain evidence of later Neolithic settlements. About 1000 years BC, the area was inhabited by the Illyrian tribe Dalmatae. They were settled in the area between the rivers of Krka and Cetina, where they clashed with the Romans in the period of wars from 156 BC to 9 AD, ending with their complete defeat under the leadership of Bato the Daesitiate.

=== Roman era ===
In Roman times, there were two important localities in the vicinity of Sinj: Colonia Claudia Aequum near today's village of Čitluk, and Tilurium, today's Gardun near Trilj.

Aequum was probably founded by Emperor Augustus as Oppidum Civium Romanorum. Among the various monuments, the famous statue of Hekate (Diana) and the head of Heracles were discovered there, which are kept in the archaeological collection of the Franciscan monastery. This is the birthplace of Roman general Sextus Julius Severus, who suppressed the Jewish uprising and destroyed Jerusalem in 135 AD.

During the long period of peace (Pax Romana), the Romans built roads in the area, fortified Osinium (Sinj), on Illyrian foundations, and Tilurium on the southernmost edge of the polje of Sinj; they built a bridge on Cetina (Pons Tilurii) and numerous villa rusticas. Tilurium was once home to the Roman 7th legion, followed by Roman auxiliary units.

Since the fall of the Western Roman Empire in 476, the Cetina region had been ruled by the Byzantine Empire.

=== Arrival of Croats ===
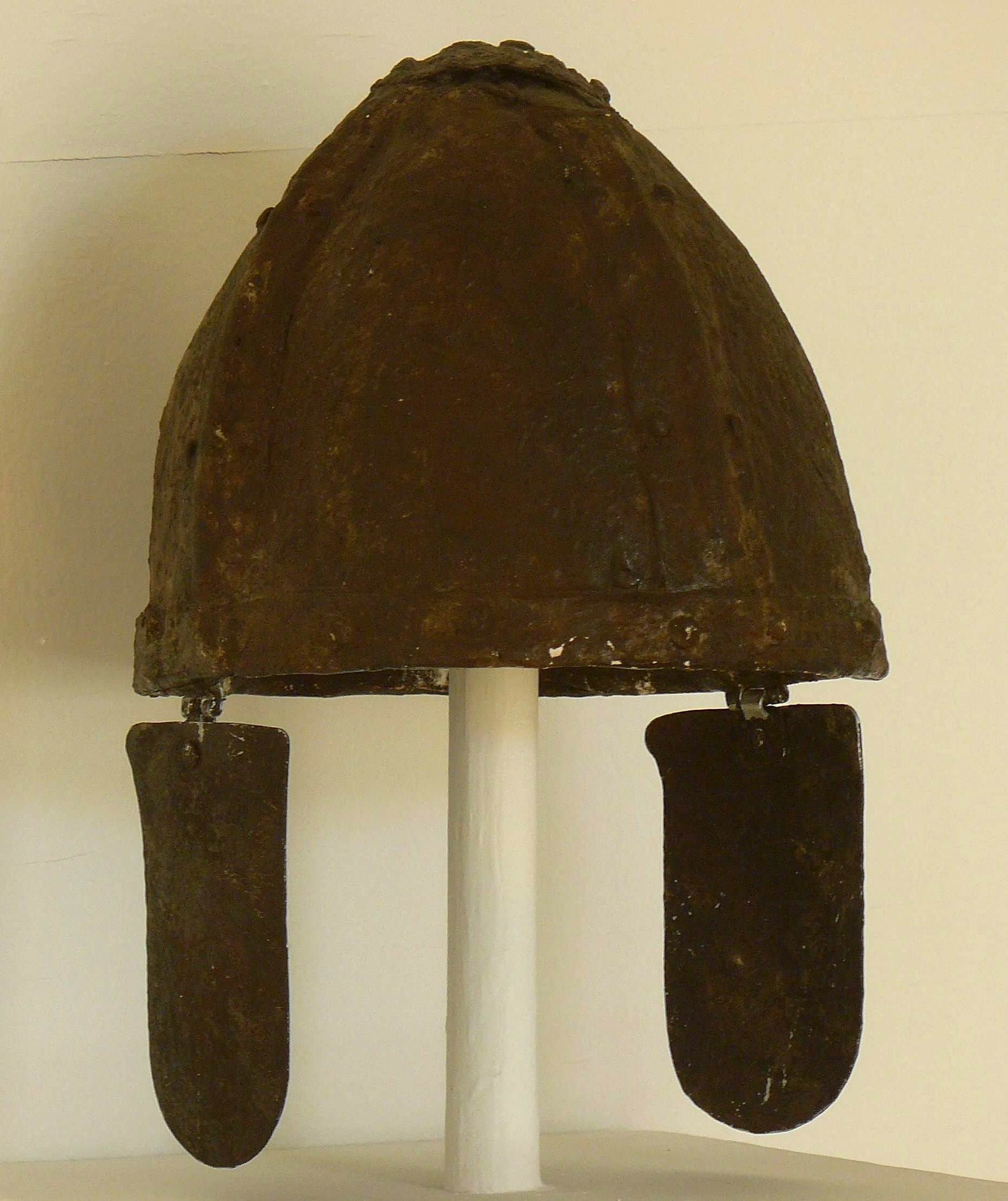
Iron spangenhelm, Migration Period

It is unknown when the Croats settled in the area. The Byzantine Emperor Constantine VII mentions the County of Cetina among the Croatian administrative units in his 10th century De Administrando Imperio. The county was located in the middle course of the Cetina River, in what is today the Sinjsko Polje carst field. Its center was the town of Cetina, on the site of today's Sinj. From the mid-14th century, the town was increasingly called after the local fortress of Sinj (Vsinj).

Following the extinction of the Trpimirović dynasty in 1102, the country was united with Hungary under the Árpád dynasty. The Cetina was ruled almost independently by the Domald family since the beginning of the 13th century, when in 1210, Prince Domald of Cetina was awarded the Cetina County by king Andrew II. From the end of the 13th century it is under the powerful Croatian Šubić family, falling under the rule of the Nelipić family in the middle of the 14th century. The toponym Sinj is recorded in written sources in a document from 1345 in which King Louis I of Anjou granted the nobleman Ivan Nelipčić the right to "castrum Zyn", while in a charter from 1341 the castrum is listed as "Fsini" or "Frini".

When Ivaniš Nelipić died without male descendants in 1434, Sinj was ruled by noble families such as Frankopan and Talovac, and despite their efforts, it never fell under the Counts of Celje. Since the collapse of the Bosnian Kingdom in the 1460s, Sinj has been increasingly attacked by the Ottoman Turks, and was defended by the bans Pavao Špirančić and Ivan Thuz, duke Ivaniš Korvin and prince Žarko Dražojević of Poljica. Discord and conflicts follow, and Sinj is eventually ruled by the Turks.

=== Ottoman and Venetian era ===
The Cetina County was gradually conquered during the Ottoman incursions from 1483 to 1524, when it ceased to exist. In 1516, Sinj was conquered, and eventually lost its importance, becoming a small settlement on the road connecting Bosnia to the Adriatic Sea. Part of the Croatian population fled, part remained, and the smallest part converted to Islam. At the time, the fortress and its suburb had about a hundred houses and about a thousand inhabitants.

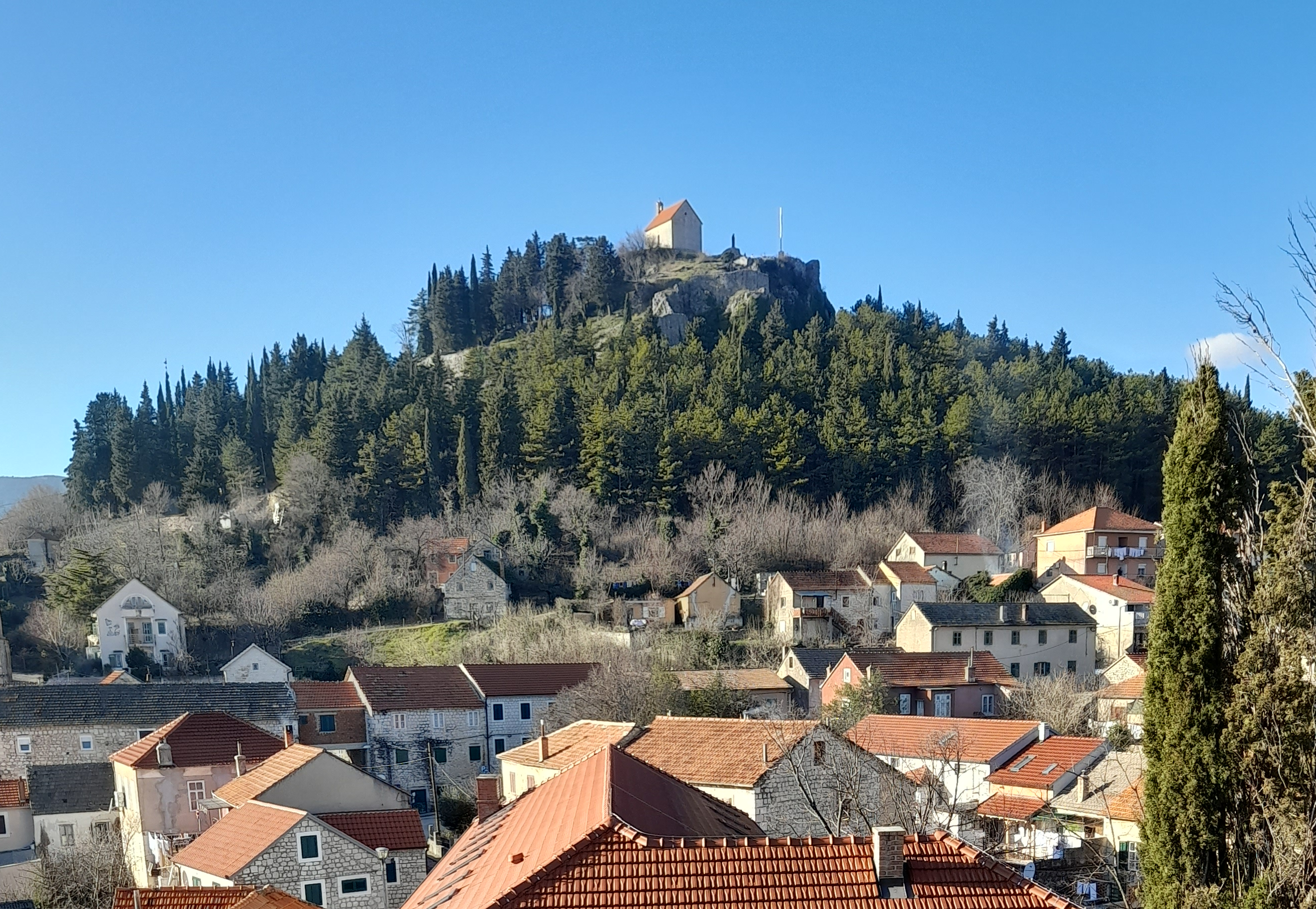
Remains of the Old Town of Sinj fortress on top of the hill

With the return of power of the Republic of Venice to nearby Fortress of Klis in 1648, Sinj regained its old importance as the last Turkish outpost towards the Venetian possessions. After several failed attempts to break free from Turkish rule, the new provisor Girolamo Cornaro with about 7,000 fighters captured the fortress on September 25, 1686.

At the end of the 17th century, the area became part of the Venetian military border, when it is called Cetinska krajina, a name that has remained to this day.

Due to harsh living conditions and constant oppression under Ottoman rule, the domicile population declined, so Venetian authorities attempted to attract people from western Bosnia. The most massive migration took place in 1687, led by the Franciscans from the Rama monastery. In August 1715, during the Second Morean War, the Turks tried to retake Sinj and kept it under siege. The siege was unsuccessful, owing primarily to the collapse of Ottoman logistics, hunger and the outbreak of dysentery; on the night of August 15, the Turks fled to Livno. Contrary to popular belief, it appears that Venetian professional army units bore the majority of the burden in the conflict with Ottoman forces, rather than local fighters. The "Diary of the Siege of Sinj" is a written Venetian account of the events; no Turkish sources mentioning the siege or battle have been discovered thus far.

Following the Treaty of Požarevac in 1718, the entire region fell under the Venetian Republic. The period is considered one of poor prospects, although the town began to develop as a result of increased trade with Bosnia. The settlement was moved from the old and unsuitable fortress to the plain, where a new church, a monastery and the first residential houses were built soon after.

=== Austrian and French rule ===
The Republic of Venice and its possessions were abolished by the agreement between Napoleon and Holy Roman Empire (Austria) on October 17, 1797. Napoleon ceded the Venetian possessions to Austria, and in July the first Austrian troops arrived in Cetinska Krajina. This marked the beginning of the first Austrian occupation of Dalmatia, which would last for eight years. As a result of new Austrian policies, Sinj's first public elementary school opened in 1798.

1817 map of Sinj

With the defeat in the Battle of Austerlitz in 1805, Austria was forced to hand over all former Venetian possessions to Napoleon, giving the region a new master at the beginning of 1806. A tumultuous and significant period of French rule began that would last seven years. In 1811, the French established the Municipality of Sinj. The French administration canceled state subsidies wherever it was possible, thus canceling the support for Alka. Following Napoleon's defeat in Russia and near Leipzig in 1813, the Austrian army reoccupied Dalmatia, and Sinj. After the Congress of Vienna in 1815 and until 1918, the town was part of the Austrian monarchy (Austria side after the compromise of 1867), head of the district of the same name, one of the 13 Bezirkshauptmannschaften in the Kingdom of Dalmatia.

To get to know the newly acquired properties, Austrian Emperor Francis II takes a journey through Dalmatia in 1818, and visits Sinj. The people of Sinj use the opportunity to organize the tournament of Alka, which Francis II liked so much that he established a permanent annual financial support.

View from the Old Town at the end of the 19th century

Despite Germanisation and Austrian bureaucracy, Sinj made significant progress under the Austrians. In 1854, the first public high school in Dalmatia with Croatian as the language of instruction was founded in Sinj by the Franciscan Province of Split. Due to its favorable strategic position, Sinj become an important Austrian military center in Dalmatia. The bridges over the Cetina river were built between 1849 and 1851; sewerage was installed in 1878, and by the end of the century, the town had taken on its current urban form; in 1891, an important tobacco trade center opened. With the town's economic growth, which was based on trade with its neighbors and beyond, it was granted a railway connection to Split. In 1898, a major earthquake struck the town, causing widespread damage. In 1912, the town received a water supply system that provided drinking water from the Kosinac karst spring. The First World War began in 1914, with significant casualties in the Cetina region.

=== Kingdom of Serbs, Croats, and Slovenes ===
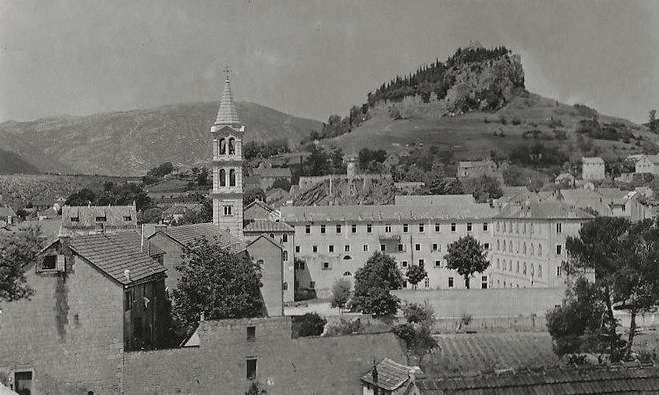
The church bell tower, and the Old Town of Sinj on the hill in the background in c. 1934. The fortress' fortifications were removed during the Napoleonic conquest in the early 19th century.

After the defeat of Austria in WWI, a new union was created in 1918, the Kingdom of Serbs, Croats, and Slovenes. The new state under the rule of the Karađorđević dynasty failed to meet public expectations. When Stjepan Radić was assassinated in the National Assembly in Belgrade in 1928, the town sent an Alka delegation to his funeral in Zagreb. Between the two world wars, the town developed a vibrant and diverse cultural life: two amateur theater groups, large choirs, two brass bands, and a philharmonic orchestra were established, and a large number of local intellectuals received classical (est. 1854) and real (est. 1921) high school education.

The city center was first electrified around 1922.

=== Second World War ===
The town and nearby settlements were under the rule of military forces of the Independent State of Croatia, Italian, and German armies. This resulted in the spread of the idea of Partisan resistance, followed by frequent reprisals by the fascist regime against the local population. The people's liberation army included approximately 500 soldiers from the town of Sinj. In total, 1338 partisans died in the fighting, 143 of whom were killed in the Battle on Sutjeska . The occupiers killed 1,888 people and set fire to 2,933 homes in 59 villages across the region. Eight partizans were declared National Heroes of Yugoslavia. In the famous Battle of the Neretva, nineteen-year-old Bruno Vuletić from Sinj commanded the 3rd Battalion of the 2nd Dalmatian Brigade, some of which were the first to cross the collapsed bridge and attack the Axis-aligned Chetniks.

On October 25, 1944, the town was liberated by the forces of the 20th Division of the Yugoslav Army.

During the war, 479 residents of the Sinj region were interned in concentration camps, the majority of whom never returned. On April 22, 1945, Ante Bakotić from Sinj led the escape of male prisoners from the Jasenovac Concentration Camp, shortly before the end of WWII. Many of the 1,073 detainees at the time, including Bakotić, did not survive the flight.

=== Socialist Republic of Croatia ===
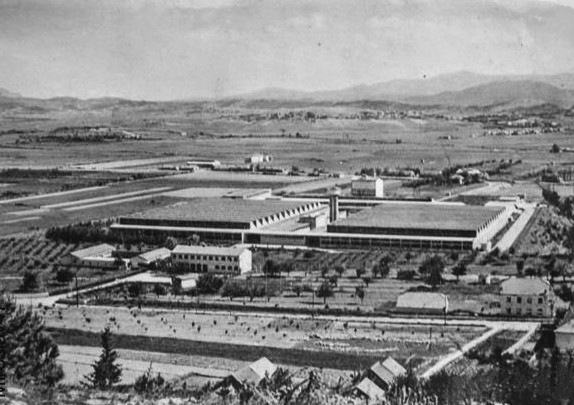
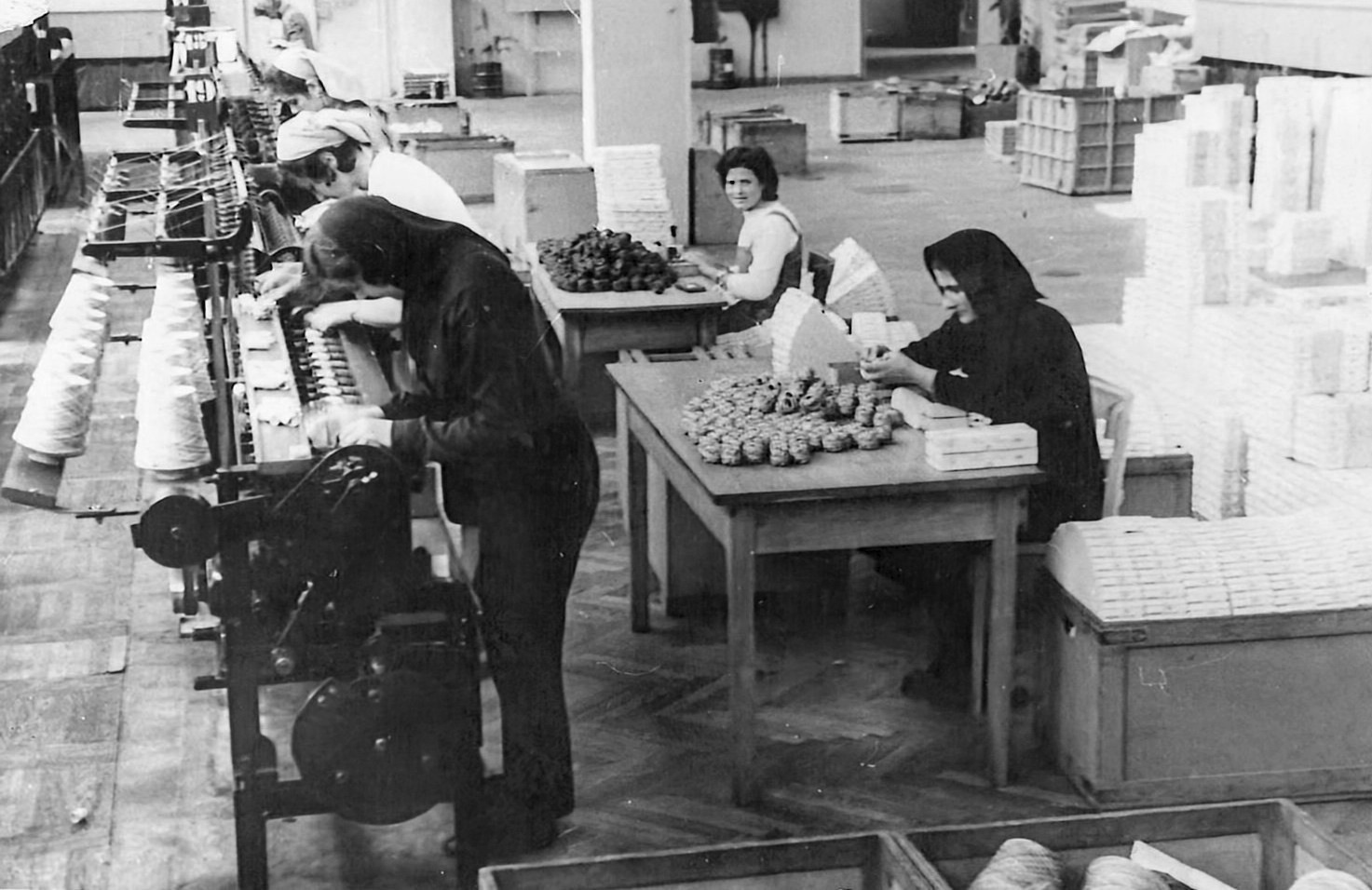
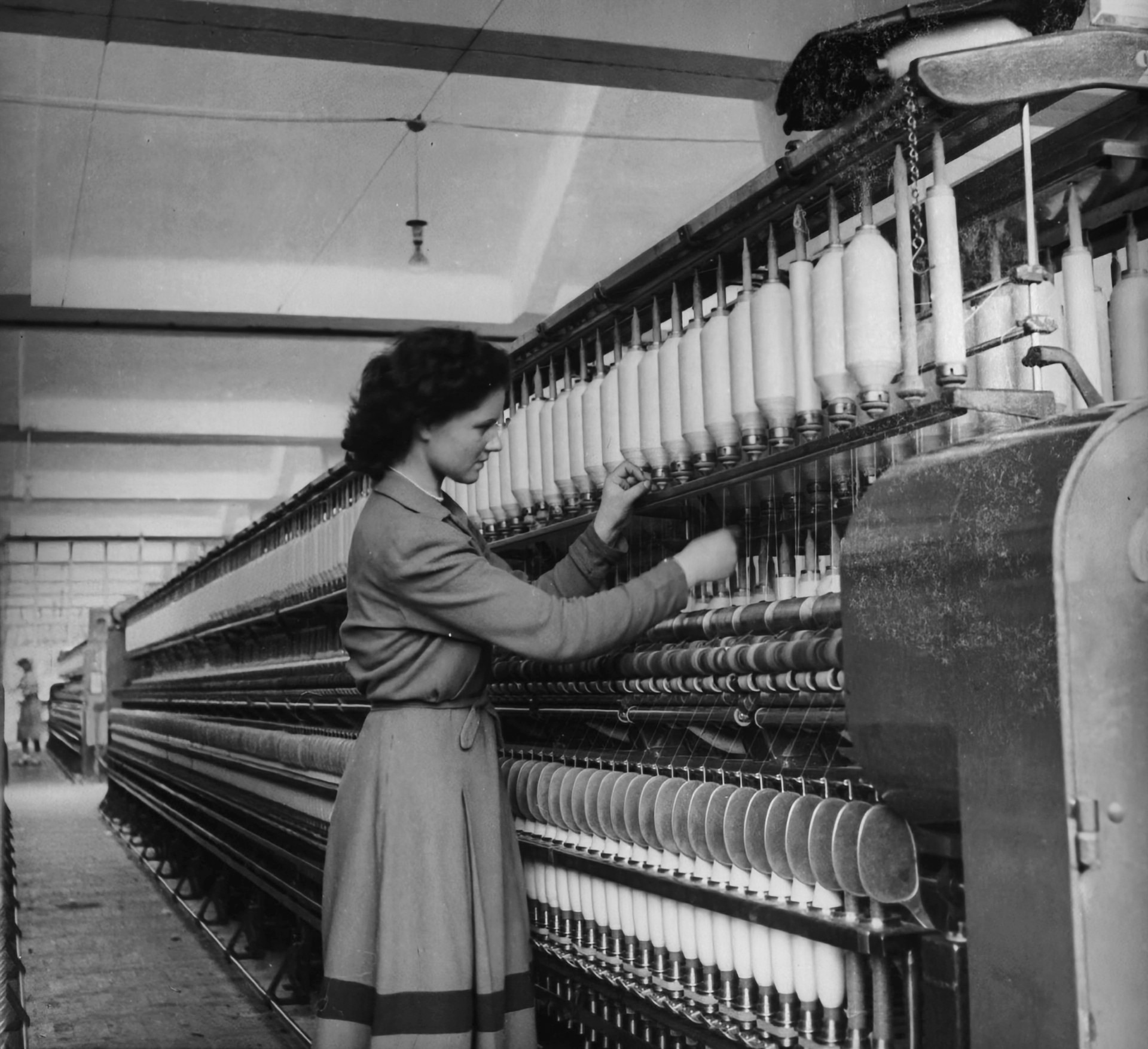
The Dalmatinka Yarn and Thread Factory in 1950s/1960s

Following WWII, there was extensive work to increase literacy, emancipate women, and accelerate industrial development. Dalmatinka cotton processing factory was established in 1951, along with Trnovača agricultural plant, Cetinka factory, Naprijed wood processing company, and Autoprijevoz, a freight and bus transport company. Three hydroelectric plants were built along the Cetina river: Peruća (1960), Orlovac (1972), and Đale (1989). Comprehensive healthcare was established, and a health center with a maternity ward was built. A variety of sports, art, and technical clubs, as well as the town's scout organization, were formed. In 1959, the town's music school began offering lessons in solfeggio, piano, violin, and wind instruments.

The city was rapidly expanding through planned construction, which began with housing for workers at the newly established megafactory Dalmatinka; the town's Olympic swimming pool was built in parallel with the building of the factory. Sinjski skojevci Elementary School opened (in 1977), as well as with a new large sports hall, a hotel, a hippodrome for the 1979 Mediterranean Games, and a large high school building. The construction of the Split-Zagreb state road (1963) improves traffic connections, but the narrow-gauge railway known as Sinjska rera, which connected the town to Split, was discontinued in 1962.

=== Independent Croatia ===
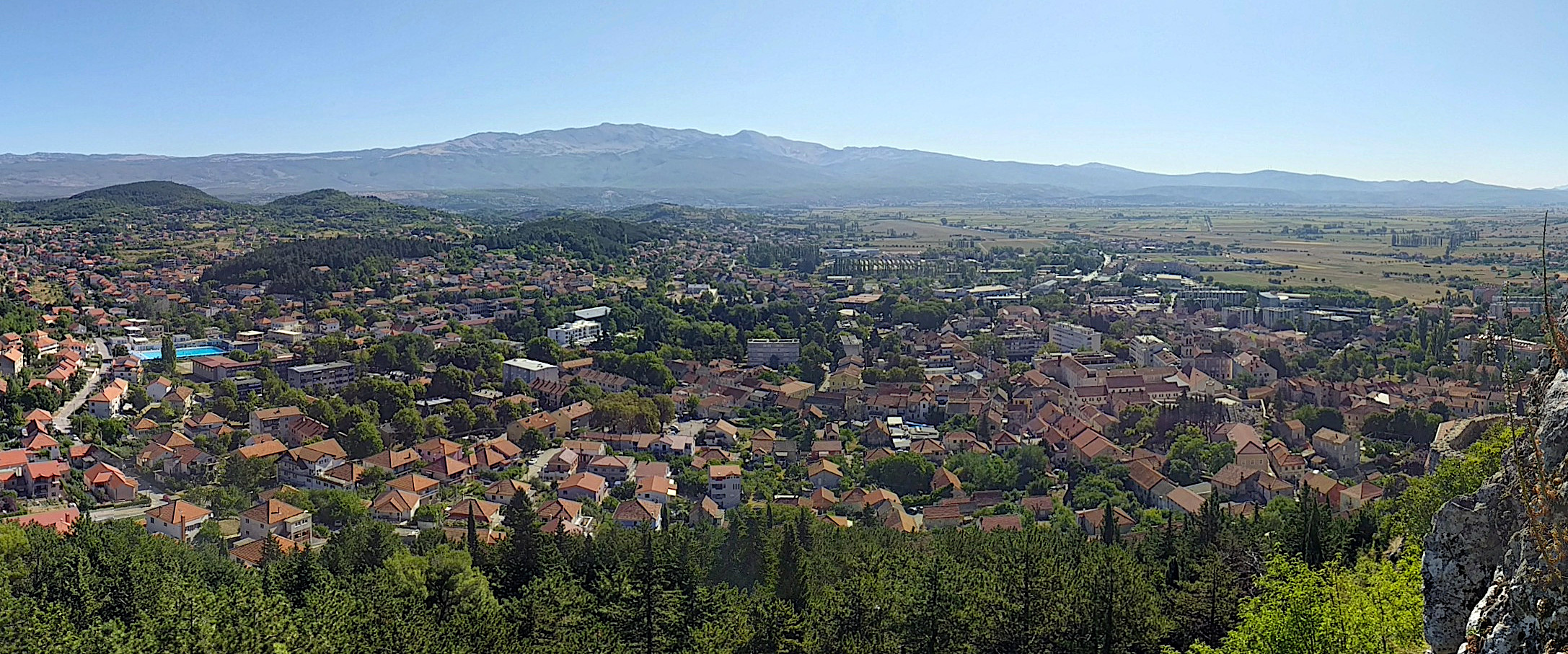
View of Sinj from the Old Town

Since the summer of 1991, a large part of the old Municipality of Sinj was occupied, and Sinj was within artillery range of the rebel Serbs' positions, about 6 km away; some 3,000 shells were fired at the city. Along with the rest of Dalmatia, Sinj was cut off from the Croatia in terms of transportation and energy.

In modern Croatia, Sinj has regressed economically: industry from the socialist period either collapsed or was destroyed by war and tycoon privatization during the war. Most of the economy consists of service activities. The city promotes the development of agriculture, transport, tourism, and industry, so far with limited success.

== Demographics ==
As of the 2021 census, the total population of the municipality was 23 452, distributed across the following settlements:

- Bajagić, population 496
- Brnaze, population 3 124
- Čitluk, population 462
- Glavice, population 3 597
- Gljev, population 225
- Jasensko, population 306
- Karakašica, population 682
- Lučane, population 601
- Obrovac Sinjski, population 794
- Radošić, population 681
- Sinj, population 10 771
- Suhač, population 577
- Turjaci, population 1 014
- Zelovo, population 122
Town of Sinj: Population trends 1857–2021
v

population	7600	8256	9025	10089	11543	13205	13770	14829	15526	16864	18687	20598	23849	25985	25373	24826	23452
	1857	1869	1880	1890	1900	1910	1921	1931	1948	1953	1961	1971	1981	1991	2001	2011	2021

Sources: Croatian Bureau of Statistics publications

== Attractions ==
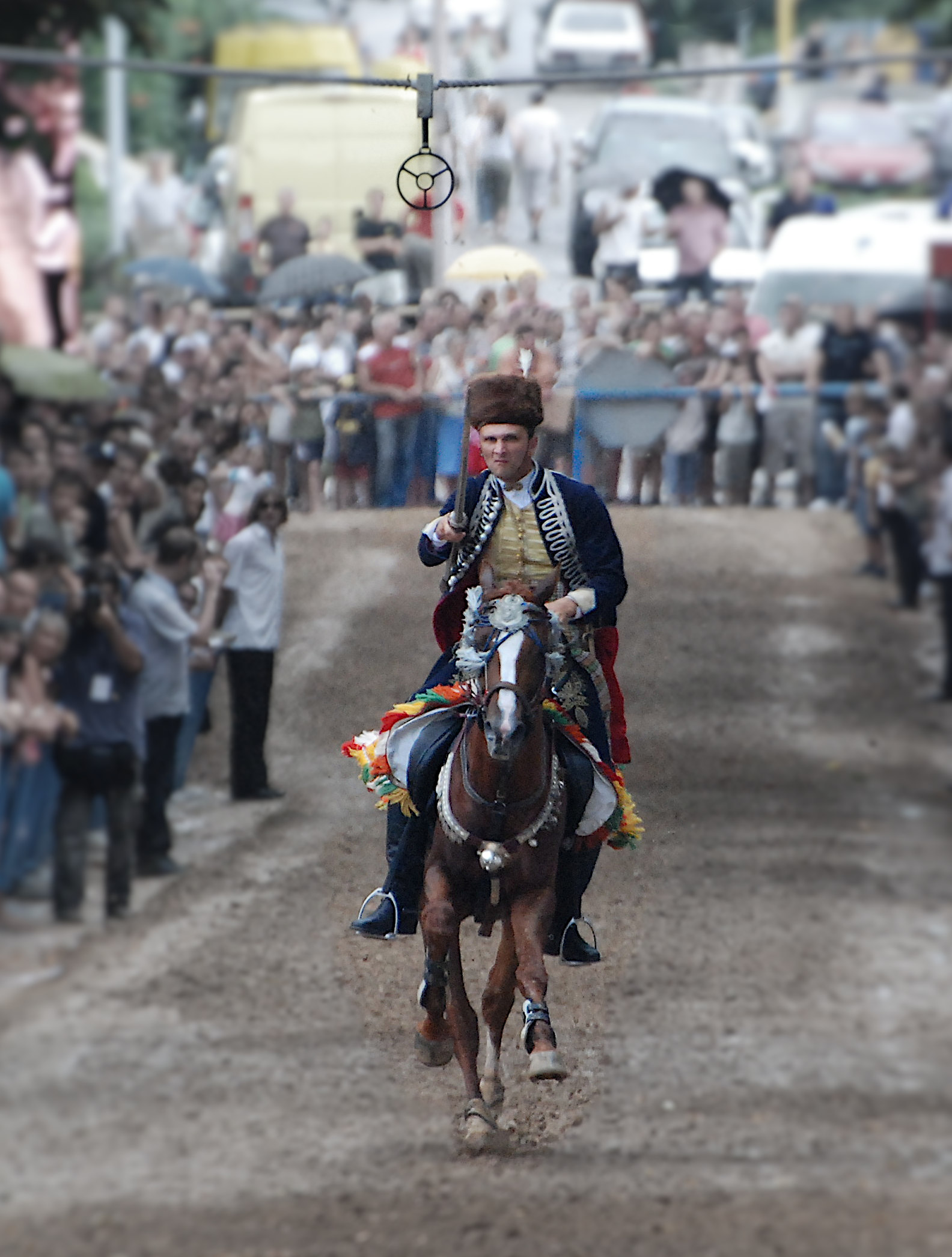
Sinjska alka knight's tournament

Sinj is well-known for Sinjska alka, a knights' tournament that is now on UNESCO Intangible Cultural Heritage List. Taking place in early August, it is a tourist attraction, and receives extensive media coverage and Croatia's political establishment attention. Sinj is also a pilgrimage site, with thousands of Christian worshippers visiting on the feast of the Assumption to participate in the procession with the painting of Our Lady of Sinj.

Sinj is home to the Museum of the Cetinska Krajina Region, Museum of Alka, Archaeological Collection of the Franciscan Monastery, and two galleries.

== Sports ==
The local chapter of the HPS is HPD "Svilaja", which had 32 members in 1936. At the time, the chapter had lain dormant for several years, until its 1118 dinar debt was paid off that year. Membership rose to 52 in 1937 under the Šimun Bradić presidency. It was liquidated on 20 January 1939.

== Notable people ==
- Ante Bakotić
- Ivica Buljan
- Davor Domazet-Lošo
- Ivan Lovrić
- Veljko Đurić Mišina
- Ivan Filipović Grčić
- Dragutin Kamber
- Miko Tripalo
- Marko Veselica
- Vladimir Veselica

== Twin towns and sister cities ==
Sinj is twinned with:

- Montemarciano, Italy
- Sansepolcro, Italy
- Barban, Croatia
- Đakovo, Croatia
- Vukovar, Croatia
- Šibenik, Croatia
- Trogir, Croatia
- Prozor-Rama, Bosnia and Herzegovina
- Prnjavor, Bosnia and Herzegovina
