= Aequum =

Coordinates: 43.742619°N 16.657328°E

Aequum was a Roman colony located near modern-day Čitluk, a village near Sinj, Croatia. It was founded by the emperor Claudius sometime after AD 45 and settled with the veterans of Legio VII Claudia Pia Fidelis.

== Location ==
The valley of the middle part of the Cetina river and its surrounding area, known as the District of Cetina, represent the backbone of the entire area and separate geographical region of mountainous Dalmatian hinterland. Its 100 km-long (62 mi) stream flows through dry karst fields covered by sub-Mediterranean vegetation where many archaeological remains are preserved. Modern day Čitluk is situated near the town Sinj at the edge of the Cetina valley.

== History and significance ==
During the Roman administration in the mid-first century AD, Aequum reached the status of an agrarian Roman colony after it was settled by the veterans of Legio VII Claudia Pia Fidelis during the rule of emperor Claudius (41–45 AD). The colonia was founded by Claudius and named colonia Claudia Aequum; it was the only colony in the interior of the province of Dalmatia.

Aequum was a planned city of 32 ha (79 acres) enclosed by walls 400 m × 330 m (1,310 ft × 1,080 ft) with features of classic forms of ancient urbanism (urbs quadrata). The town had an orthogonal grid of streets with numerous public building and city fortifications. Aequum was the center of a wider area where the colonists lived, and it was packed with public services, with very little housing. The city offered colonists from a wider area a place to fulfill their administrative, cultural, religious and social needs and duties. In his 1774 Viaggio in Dalmazia ("Journey to Dalmatia"), Alberto Fortis describes the ruins of canals and an ancient amphitheatre.

== The Site ==
The area is not fully explored. The remains of a forum with a capitol, towers of the fortification complex of the eastern city gate, thermal baths and parts of cult buildings and the remains of the monumental fortification complex of the southern city gate were discovered. Fragments of the statue of Hercules and the statue of Hecate (Diana Lucifera) are of exceptional value and are preserved in the archaeological collection of the Franciscan Monastery at Sinj.

== Notable persons ==
Sextus Julius Severus was a member of one of the most notable families in Roman Dalmatia. He served as governor of Moesia and was appointed governor of Britain in 131. According to Cassius Dio, Severus was Hadrian's best general. In 135 AD, he suppressed the Jewish rebellion (Bar Kokhba revolt) in Judaea, the event that marked the beginning of the Jewish diaspora.
