= Ivan Filipović Grčić =

Ivan Filipović Grčić (c. 1660 – 1715) was a Croatian Catholic priest, soldier and writer.

Ivan Filipović Grčić was born in Sinj. He participated in the beginning of the Morean War, where he joined a group of men from the Cetina region to fight the Ottomans.

In 2016 the town of Sinj unveiled a statue in his honour.
