= Radošić =

Radošić may refer to:

- Radošić, Sinj, a village near Sinj, Croatia
- Radošić, Lećevica, a village in Lećevica, Croatia
