= Vladimir Veselica =

Croatian politician and economist (1938–2013)

Personal details
- Born: 23 January 1938 Glavice near Sinj, Kingdom of Yugoslavia (now Croatia)
- Died: 11 December 2013 (aged 75) Zagreb, Croatia
- Education: Faculty of Economics, University of Zagreb
- Occupation: Politician; Economist; University professor

Vladimir Veselica (23 January 1938 – 11 December 2013) was a Croatian politician, economist and university professor born in Glavice near Sinj. He graduated and received PhD in economics from the Faculty of Economics, University of Zagreb in 1970. In the aftermath of the Croatian Spring, Veselica was removed from his post of a lecturer at the Higher School of Foreign Trade in 1972 as the supporter of the ousted leadership of the League of Communists of Croatia and the ideas championed by Matica hrvatska. In 1974–1989, Veselica performed managerial functions in Konstruktor-Split construction company. In 1989, he founded and chaired the Croatian Democratic Party (HDS) established shortly before the 1990 Croatian parliamentary election. He was a member of the Croatian Parliament in 1990–1992 and a minister without portfolio in the 1991 Cabinet of Franjo Gregurić. Veselica was a professor at the Zagreb Faculty of Economics from 1992 until his retirement in 2008. He died in Zagreb on 11 December 2013.

== See also ==
- Marko Veselica – Croatian politician, older brother of Vladimir Veselica
