= Bajagić =

Bajagić may refer to:

- Bajagić, Croatia, a village near Sinj
- Momčilo Bajagić (born 1960), Serbian musician
