= Glavice =

Glavice may refer to:

- Glavice, Croatia, a village near Sinj
- Glavice, Bugojno, a village near Bugojno, Bosnia and Herzegovina
- Glavice, Sanski Most, a village near Sanski Most, Bosnia and Herzegovina
