= Gljev =

Settlement in Split-Dalmatia County, Croatia

- Settlement
- Interactive map of Gljev
- Location within Croatia
- Coordinates: 43°44′06″N 16°45′40″E
- Country: Croatia
- County: Split-Dalmatia
- City: Sinj

Area
  - Total: 28.7 km^{2} (11.1 sq mi)

Population (2021)
  - Total: 225
  - Density: 7.84/km^{2} (20.3/sq mi)
- Time zone: UTC+1 (CET)
  - Summer (DST): UTC+2 (CEST)
- Postal code: 21238 Otok
- Area code: +385 (0)21

Gljev is a settlement in the City of Sinj in Croatia. In 2021, its population was 225.

== Demographics ==
Gljev: Population trends 1857–2021
v

population	357	420	425	519	631	733	679	698	694	683	713	669	637	562	363	326	225
	1857	1869	1880	1890	1900	1910	1921	1931	1948	1953	1961	1971	1981	1991	2001	2011	2021

Sources: Croatian Bureau of Statistics publications
