= Museum of the Cetinska Krajina Region =

Museum in Sinj, Croatia

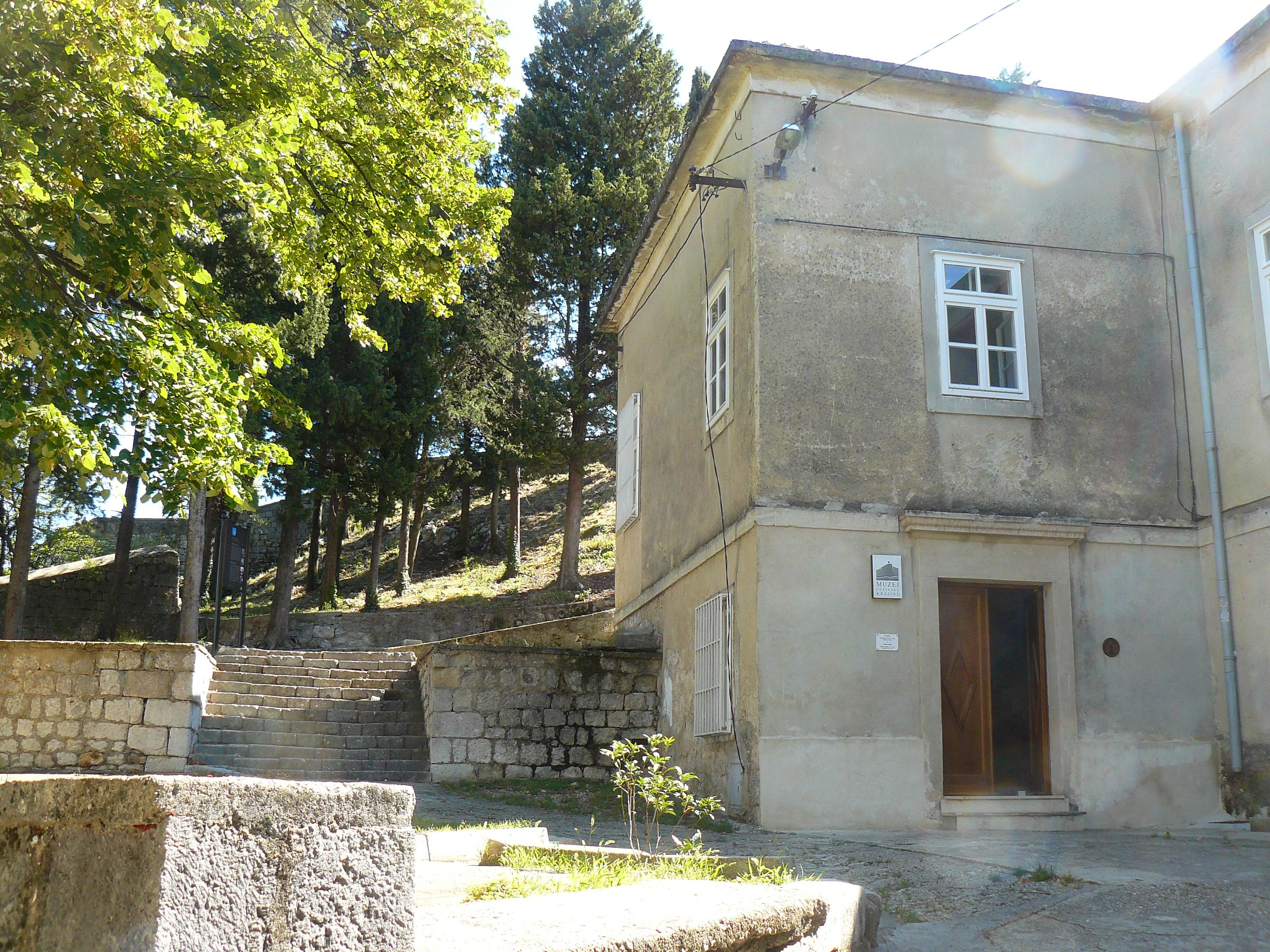
Museum of the Cetinska Krajina Region in Sinj

The Museum of the Cetinska Krajina Region (Croatian: Muzej Cetinske krajine) in Sinj is a museum focusing on the cultural and historical heritage of the Cetinska Krajina region. It was founded in 1956 and has several collections including archaeological, numismatic, cultural historical, ethnographic and natural science collections.
