= Ruda (river) =

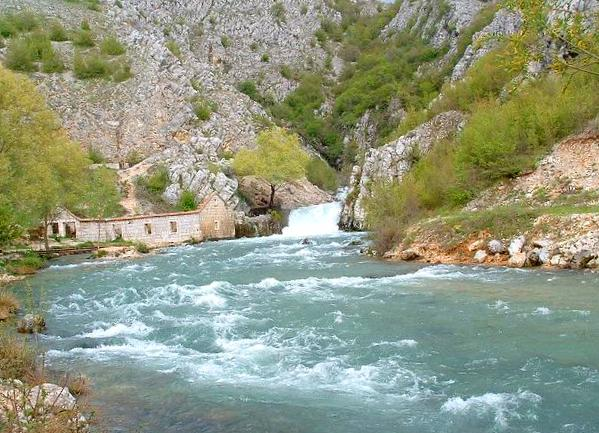

Location
- Country: Croatia

Physical characteristics
- Mouth
  - location: Cetina
  - coordinates: 43.6283°N 16.7325°E

Basin features
- Progression: Cetina→ Adriatic Sea

Ruda is a small river in the Dalmatian Zagora region of Croatia. It is a left tributary of the Cetina river, into which it flows about 1 km north of Trilj. The Orlovac Hydroelectric Power Plant, located partly in the Split-Dalmatia County and partly in Bosnia and Herzegovina, discharges the water used to generates power into the Ruda river.
