= Ante Bakotić =

Croatian Partisan

- Born: 14 June 1921; Sinj, Kingdom of Serbs, Croats and Slovenes
- Died: 22 April 1945 (aged 23); Jasenovac, Independent State of Croatia
- Occupation: Military technician

Ante Bakotić (14 June 1921 – 22 April 1945) was a Croatian Partisan known for marking the beginning of the 1945 breakthrough from the Jasenovac concentration camp by shouting "Forward, comrades!".

== Early life and education ==
Ante Bakotić was born in Sinj on 14 June 1921 as the fourth child in the family of six. He attended primary school in his native Sinj, where he also enrolled in the high school that he for unknown reasons stopped and began to study the carpenter trade. Due to poor working conditions and mistreatment by his masters, Bakotić left the apprenticeship and enrolled in Military-technical school in Kruševac from which he eventually graduated. After graduation, he went to Sarajevo and started working in the defense industry. He joined the League of Communists of Yugoslavia in 1939.

== Participation in World War II ==
During 1941-45, World War II Bakotić fought as a member of the Yugoslav Partisans. In the spring of 1942 Bakotić and a group of partisans were caught by enemies in the Neretva valley, and were deported to Jasenovac prison .

Until the end of September 1944, there was a secret Communist Party organization of the Jasenovac prison, led by the People's Hero of Yugoslavia Milo Bošković; this secret conclave had been working on preparations for the prison detainees breakthrough. The work of the organisation was compromised on 21 September 1944, which led to the brutal murder of almost all of its members. Bakotić eventually restarted the plan, this time as Secretary. The organisation operated in secret on the plan for the breakthrough. Its work culminated in the spring of 1945.

== Breakthrough ==
The male camp detainees attempted their breakthrough and breakout on 22 April 1945, just before the end of the war. The building in the women's camp had housed 760 women until the evening before when the women were marched to their deaths. The number of male detainees, on the night of the 21–22 April, was 1,073. That night they decided to breakthrough on the morning on 22 April around 10 am. Bakotić played a prominent role in the breakthrough by shouting "Forward, comrades!", which marked the beginning of the breakthrough. Bakotić did not survive. He was killed near the eastern gate of the camp. He was 23 years old. Of the 1,073, only around 80 survived the escape, including Ilija Ivanović (later awarded the Order of Stjepan Radić, see below), wrote of his experiences in Witness to Jasenovacs Hell.

Bakotić's death was described by two surviving detainees in their memoirs:

Čedomir Huber: "When we got out of the gate, Ante was fatally flattened. I stopped to help him but he told me to go ahead and that someone had to stay alive. With last bit of energy, I saw, he dragged himself to the shore of Sava and lost in its waves."

Mile Ristić: "I remember that I saw Ante Bakotić walking on the road with his lungs heaving like a blacksmith's bellows. I invited him to come down to me and to go through the dead angle. He just waved his hand and didn't go down. Then, he was hit by a bullet, and he crashed into the river."

== Remembrance ==
- On 31 October 2009, Croatian President Stjepan Mesić revealed a commemorative plaque on the facade of the Bakotić's birth house in Sinj, in the same place from whence the prior plaque was removed in the mid-1990s, and stored in the Museum of Cetina region. During the night of 23–24 February 2013, unknown vandals tried to remove the memorial plaque, eventually damaging it. The plaque was returned the next day, 25 February 2013.
- On the 68th anniversary of the breakthrough of the last group of prisoners of Jasenovac camp, on the proposal of the Public Institution of the Jasenovac Memorial, Croatian President Ivo Josipović awarded the Order of Stjepan Radić to three living participants of the breakthrough: Yeshua Abinun, Ilija Ivanoviċ, and Basil Zuko.

== Bibliography ==
- Đurđević-Đukić, Olga (1975). Narodni heroji Jugoslavije, A-M, N-Ž. Beograd: Mladost.
