= Turjaci =

Settlement in Sinj, Croatia

- settlement
- Interactive map of Turjaci
- Location within Croatia
- Coordinates: 43°38′46″N 16°40′23″E
- Country: Croatia
- County: Split-Dalmatia
- City: Sinj

Area
  - Total: 18.7 km^{2} (7.2 sq mi)

Population (2021)
  - Total: 1,014
  - Density: 54.2/km^{2} (140/sq mi)
- Time zone: UTC+1 (CET)
  - Summer (DST): UTC+2 (CEST)
- Postal code: 21230 Sinj
- Area code: +385 (0)21

Turjaci is a settlement in the City of Sinj in Croatia. In 2021, its population was 1014.

== Demographics ==
Turjaci: Population trends 1857–2021
v

population	544	661	603	748	821	997	998	1194	1143	1251	1281	1319	1403	1259	1169	1138	1014
	1857	1869	1880	1890	1900	1910	1921	1931	1948	1953	1961	1971	1981	1991	2001	2011	2021

Sources: Croatian Bureau of Statistics publications
