= Radošić, Sinj =

Settlement in Split-Dalmatia County, Croatia

Radošić
- Settlement
- Interactive map of Radošić
- Location of Radošić in Croatia
- Coordinates: 43°41′46″N 16°36′11″E
- Country: Croatia
- County: Split-Dalmatia
- City: Sinj

Area
  - Total: 12.8 km^{2} (4.9 sq mi)

Population (2021)
  - Total: 681
  - Density: 53.2/km^{2} (138/sq mi)
- Time zone: UTC+1 (CET)
  - Summer (DST): UTC+2 (CEST)
- Postal code: 21230 Sinj
- Area code: +385 (0)21

Radošić is a village within the area of the City of Sinj in Croatia. In 2021, its population was 681.

== Demographics ==
Radošić: Population trends 1857–2021
v

population	299	365	320	354	370	412	434	436	543	628	694	632	612	605	602	686	681
	1857	1869	1880	1890	1900	1910	1921	1931	1948	1953	1961	1971	1981	1991	2001	2011	2021

Sources: Croatian Bureau of Statistics publications
