= Our Lady of Sinj =

Venerated painting

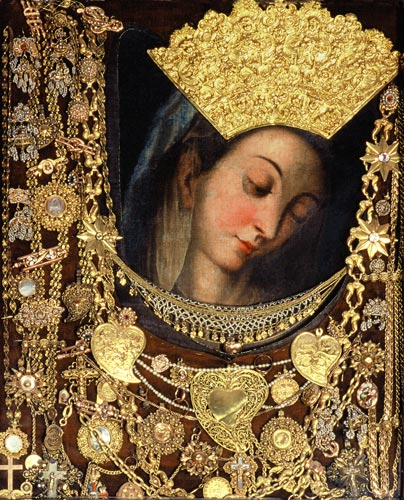
Our Lady of Sinj

Our Lady of Sinj (Croatian: Gospa sinjska) is the title given to a painting venerated as miraculous of Mary, mother of Jesus. The sanctuary in Sinj where the painting is located is a pilgrimage site.

== The painting ==
It may have been created by an unknown Venetian artist in the 16th century. The painting was originally located in Sinj and was moved to Rama, Bosnia and Herzegovina when Sinj was invaded during the Ottoman wars in Europe in 1536. It was returned to Sinj in 1687. Today, it is kept in the Franciscan monastery of the Franciscan Province of the Most Holy Redeemer. It was crowned on 1716.

== See also ==
- Marian shrines in Croatia
