= Mosor =

Mountain range in Croatia

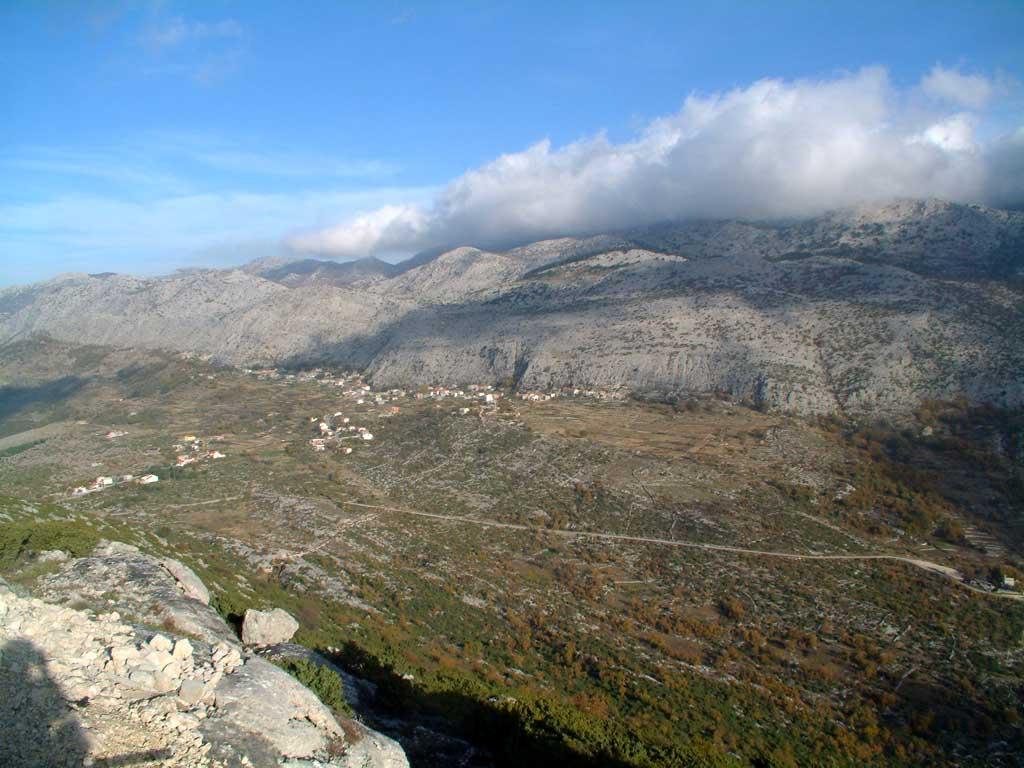
- View of Mosor from the Mosor Star Village

Highest point
- Elevation: 1,339 m (4,393 ft)
- Coordinates: 43°31′37.80″N 16°38′14.40″E

Geography
- Location within Croatia
- Location: Split-Dalmatia County, Croatia

Mosor (Latin: Massarus), or Mount Mosor (Massarus Mons; Italian: Monte Massaro), is a mountain range in Croatia located near the city of Split on the Adriatic coast. It belongs to Dinaric Alps, and stretches from the pass of Klis in the northwest to the Cetina River in the southeast.

The highest point is the eponymous Mosor peak at 1,339 m.a.s.l. There are no inhabited areas on the mountain above 600 metres. Mosor is mainly composed of karst — limestone rocks.

It attracts mountaineers from Croatia. There are two alpine huts and many mountaineering paths on Mosor.

== Mountain huts ==
In the 1935–1936 season, the Dom Kraljice Marije mountain hut, at 900 metres (3,000 ft) in elevation, saw 720 visitors, including 10 Czechoslovak, 7 German and 4 Italian citizens. The logger's hut on Uznička Kosa at 940 metres (3,080 ft) saw 29 visitors. In the 1936–1937 season, the Dom Kraljice Marije saw 740 visitors, including 5 German, 2 Czechoslovak, 2 Austrian and 1 English citizen; the logger's hut was closed that year. In the 1937–1938 season it saw 541 visitors, including 17 Czechoslovak, 9 Italian, 5 Austrian, 3 German and 1 Polish citizens; the logger's hut below Kunjevoda at 940 metres (3,080 ft) saw 138 visitors.
