= Jasensko =

Settlement in Split-Dalmatia County, Croatia

- Settlement
- Interactive map of Jasensko
- Location within Croatia
- Coordinates: 43°43′39″N 16°39′18″E
- Country: Croatia
- County: Split-Dalmatia
- City: Sinj

Area
  - Total: 2.3 km^{2} (0.89 sq mi)

Population (2021)
  - Total: 306
  - Density: 130/km^{2} (340/sq mi)
- Time zone: UTC+1 (CET)
  - Summer (DST): UTC+2 (CEST)
- Postal code: 21230 Sinj
- Area code: +385 (0)21

Jasensko is a settlement in the City of Sinj in Croatia. In 2021, its population was 306.

== Demographics ==
Jasensko: Population trends 1857–2021
v

population	186		13	221	191	198			294	319	353	360	326	422	365	341	306
	1857	1869	1880	1890	1900	1910	1921	1931	1948	1953	1961	1971	1981	1991	2001	2011	2021

Sources: Croatian Bureau of Statistics publications
