= Obrov =

Obrov may refer to:

- Obrov, Montenegro
- Obrov, Hrpelje-Kozina, Slovenia
