= Obrovac Sinjski =

Settlement in Split-Dalmatia County, Croatia

- Settlement
- Interactive map of Obrovac Sinjski
- Location of Obrovac Sinjski in Croatia
- Coordinates: 43°43′48″N 16°41′06″E
- Country: Croatia
- County: Split-Dalmatia
- City: Sinj

Area
  - Total: 22.1 km^{2} (8.5 sq mi)

Population (2021)
  - Total: 794
  - Density: 35.9/km^{2} (93.1/sq mi)
- Time zone: UTC+1 (CET)
  - Summer (DST): UTC+2 (CEST)
- Postal code: 21238 Otok
- Area code: +385 (0)21

Obrovac Sinjski is a village within the area of the City of Sinj in Croatia. In 2021, its population was 794.

== Demographics ==
Obrovac Sinjski: Population trends 1857–2021
v

population	439	527	585	691	756	819	913	993	1015	1060	1041	978	987	991	913	804	794
	1857	1869	1880	1890	1900	1910	1921	1931	1948	1953	1961	1971	1981	1991	2001	2011	2021

Sources: Croatian Bureau of Statistics publications
