= Obrovac, Banja Luka =

Obrovac Обровац (Serbian)
- Village (Selo)
- Location within Bosnia and Herzegovina
- Coordinates: 44°46′12″N 16°53′24″E
- Country: Bosnia and Herzegovina
- Entity: Republika Srpska
- Municipality: Banja Luka

Population (2013)
  - Total: 499
- Time zone: UTC+1 (CET)
  - Summer (DST): UTC+2 (CEST)

Obrovac (Serbian Cyrillic: Обровац) is a village in the municipality of Banja Luka, Republika Srpska, Bosnia and Herzegovina. The village is situated near the Vrbas River and is part of the Banja Luka metropolitan area.

According to statistical data, Obrovac had a population of 1,046 in 1991 and 469 in 2013, indicating a significant decline over the two decades.
