= Karakašica =

Coordinates: 43°44′N 16°38′E

- Village
- Interactive map of Karakašica
- Country: Croatia
- County: Split-Dalmatia County

Area
  - Total: 1.2 sq mi (3.0 km^{2})

Population (2021)
  - Total: 682
  - Density: 590/sq mi (230/km^{2})
- Time zone: UTC+1 (CET)
  - Summer (DST): UTC+2 (CEST)

Karakašica is a village in Croatia. It is connected by the D1 highway.
