= Cetina =

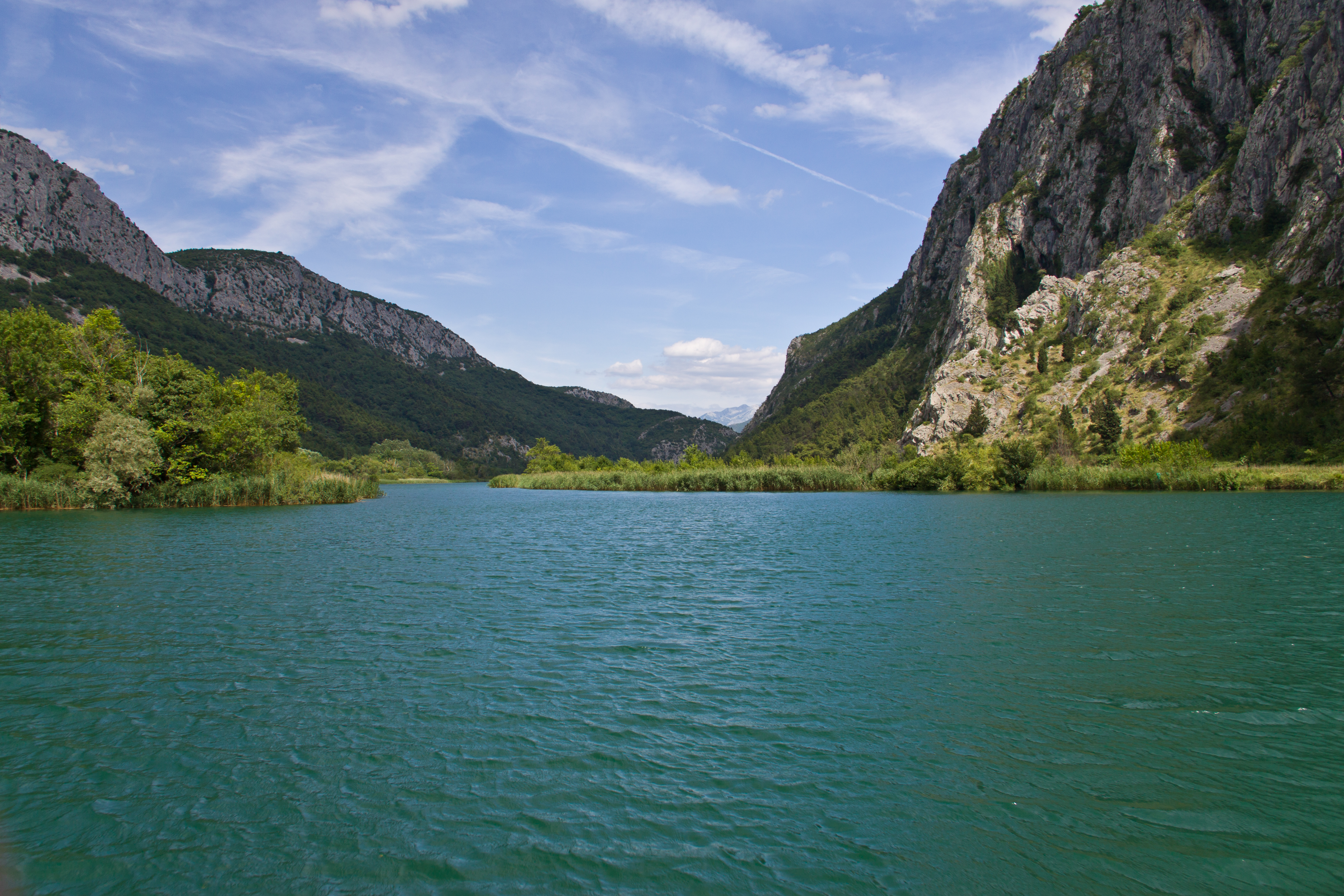
- Cetina flowing through rocky, karst terrain.

Location
- Country: Croatia

Physical characteristics
- Source
  - location: Dinara
- Mouth
  - location: Adriatic Sea
  - coordinates: 43.4398°N 16.6864°E
- Length: 101 km (63 mi)
- Basin size: 1,463 km^{2} (565 mi^{2})

The Cetina (pronounced [ˈʦětina]) is a river in southern Croatia. It has a length of 101 km (63 mi) and its basin covers an area of 1,463 km^{2} (565 mi^{2}). From its source, Cetina descends from an elevation of 385 metres (1,263 ft) above sea level to the Adriatic Sea. It is the most water-rich river in Dalmatia.

The Cetina is home to the only known species of freshwater coralline algae Pneophyllum cetinaensis. The species is endemic to the river.

== Geography and geology ==
The canyon of Cetina river and Gubavica waterfalls near Zadvarje

Cetina river mouth at Omiš

Cetina has its source in the northwestern slopes of Dinara. Rising from a spring at Milasevo near a small village called Cetina, 7 kilometres (4.3 mi) north of Vrlika, it flows 101 kilometres (63 mi) to the Adriatic Sea. A large artificial lake begins near Vrlika, the Peruća Lake, which was created by a dam some 25 kilometres (16 mi) downstream. Cetina then passes into the lower portion of the Sinj karst field, through the city of Sinj. After that it runs eastward, through the city of Trilj and then back westward around the Mosor mountain, before flowing into the Adriatic in the city of Omiš.

Apart from its visible basin, the Cetina also receives a lot of water from the west Bosnian karst field via underground routes. Its lower course begins from the Gubavica Falls, at 49 metres (161 ft) above sea level, near the village of Zadvarje, 20 kilometres (12 mi) from Omiš. Here it leaves its canyon and flows into a valley which has nevertheless retained something of the appearance of a canyon.

The latter portion of Cetina and its relatively large drop in elevation was used to build several substantial hydroelectric power plants. Its water is also bottled as Cetina.

The total drainage area of the catchment is around 12,000 km^{2}, and the annual discharge is around 105 m^{3}s^{−1} as a consequence of a mean annual rainfall of 1380 mm.

Bounded to the east by the Dinaric Alps, which rise to an elevation of 2,000 metres (6,600 ft), and to the northwest by mountain Svilaja, the majority of the catchment drains calcareous rocks of Cretaceous age, predominantly limestone. Rocks of Triassic and Jurassic age also crop out in the catchment and include dolomitic limestone and flysch. The underlying karst geology controls relief with a series of structurally aligned basins separated by high ridges.

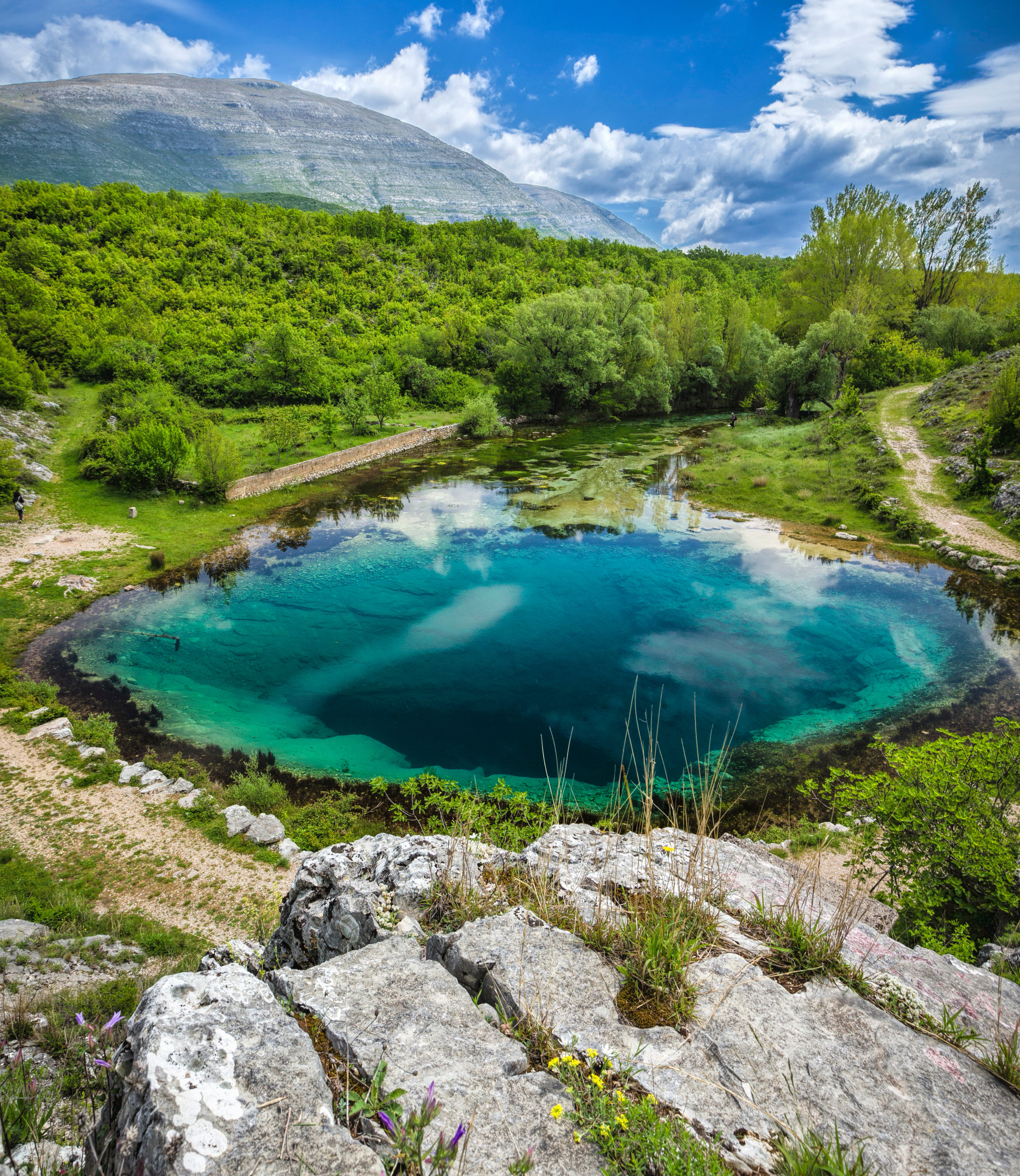
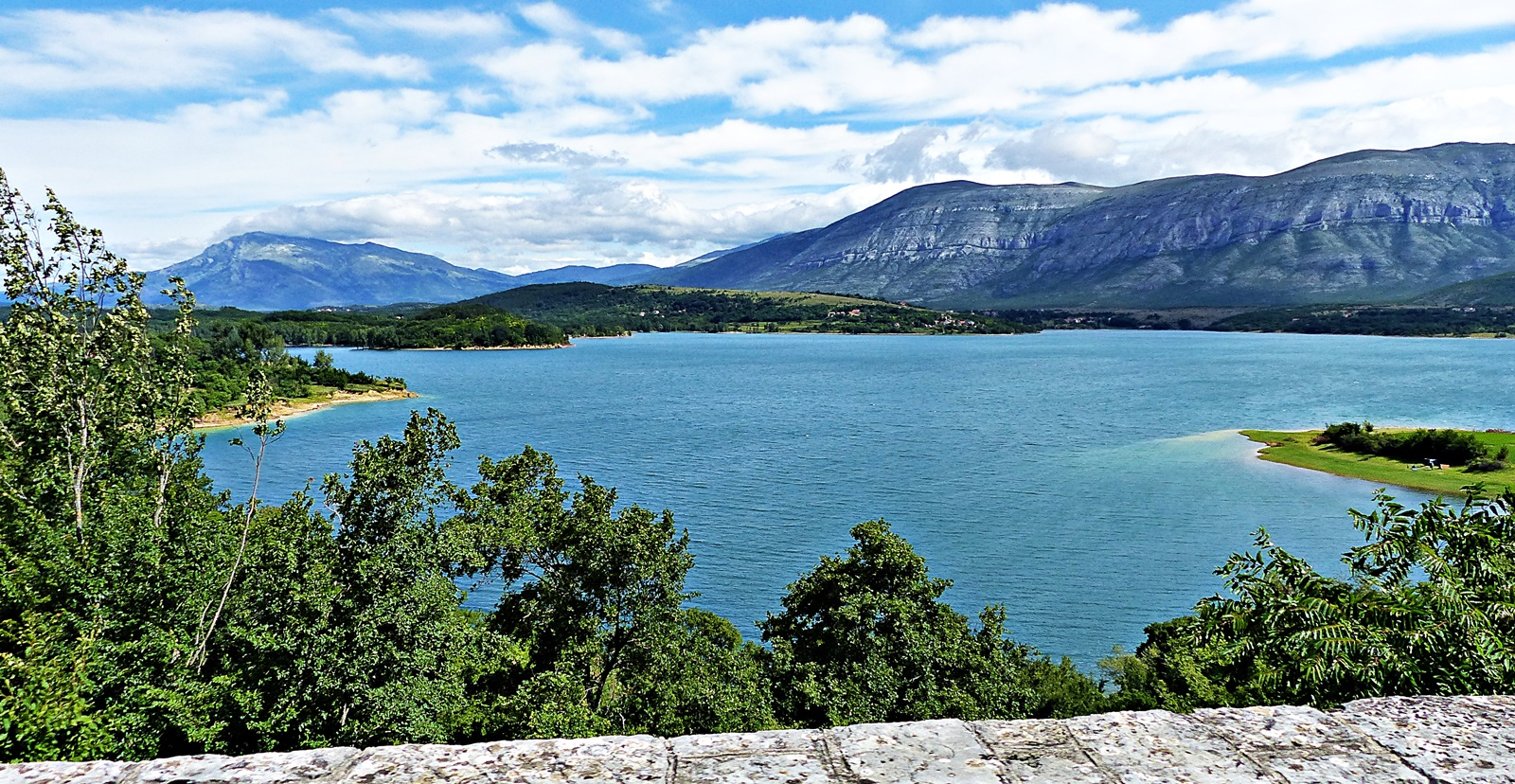
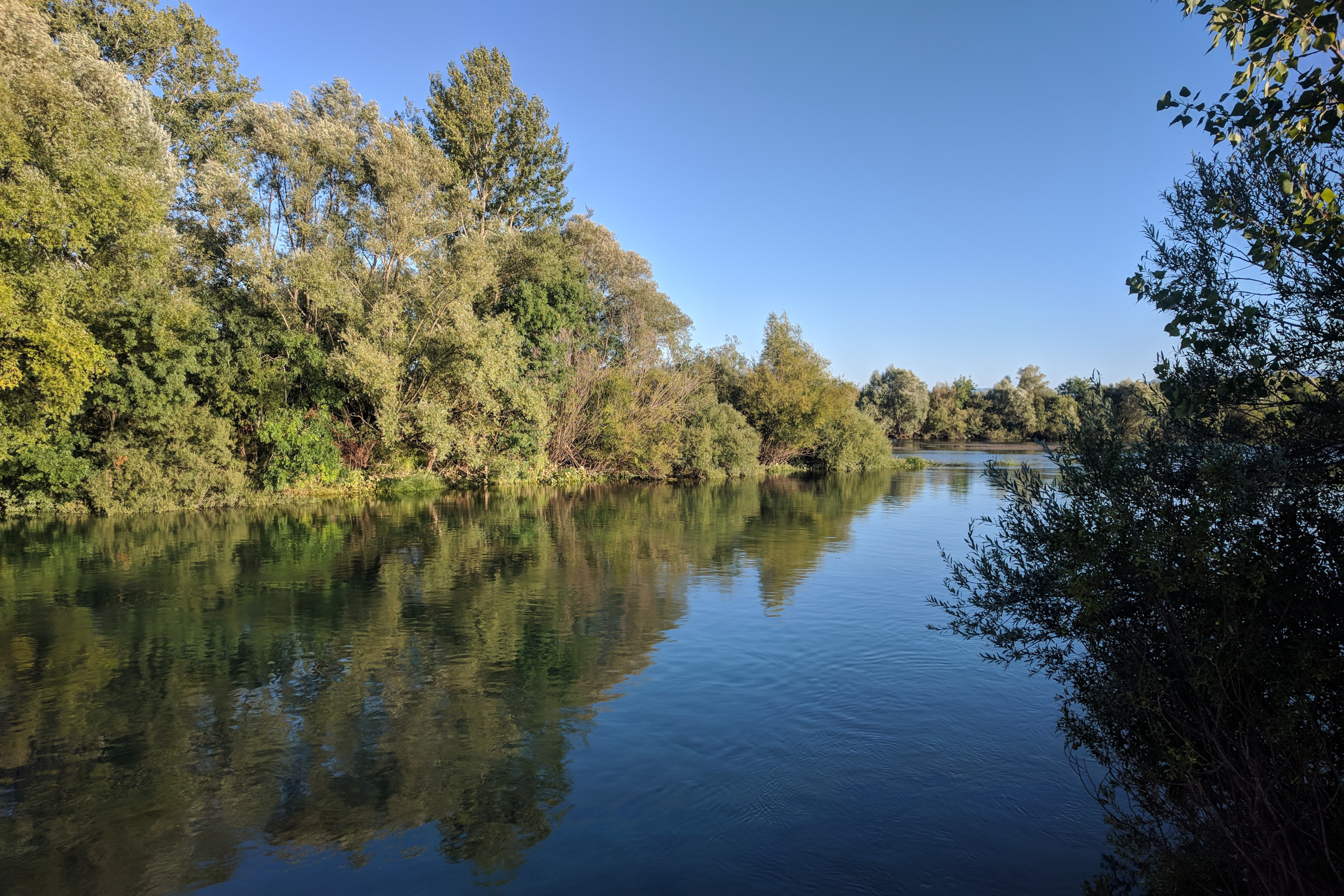
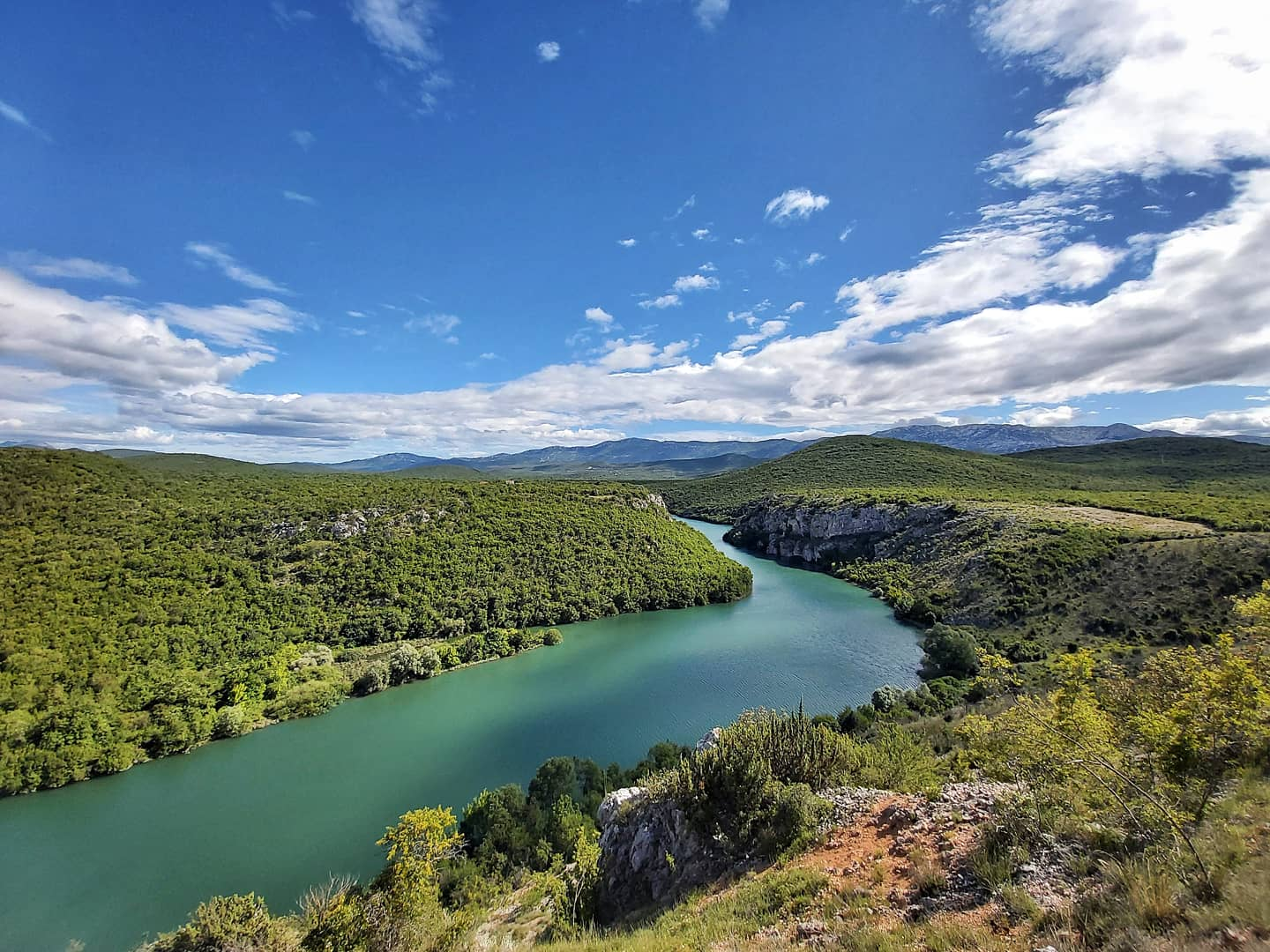
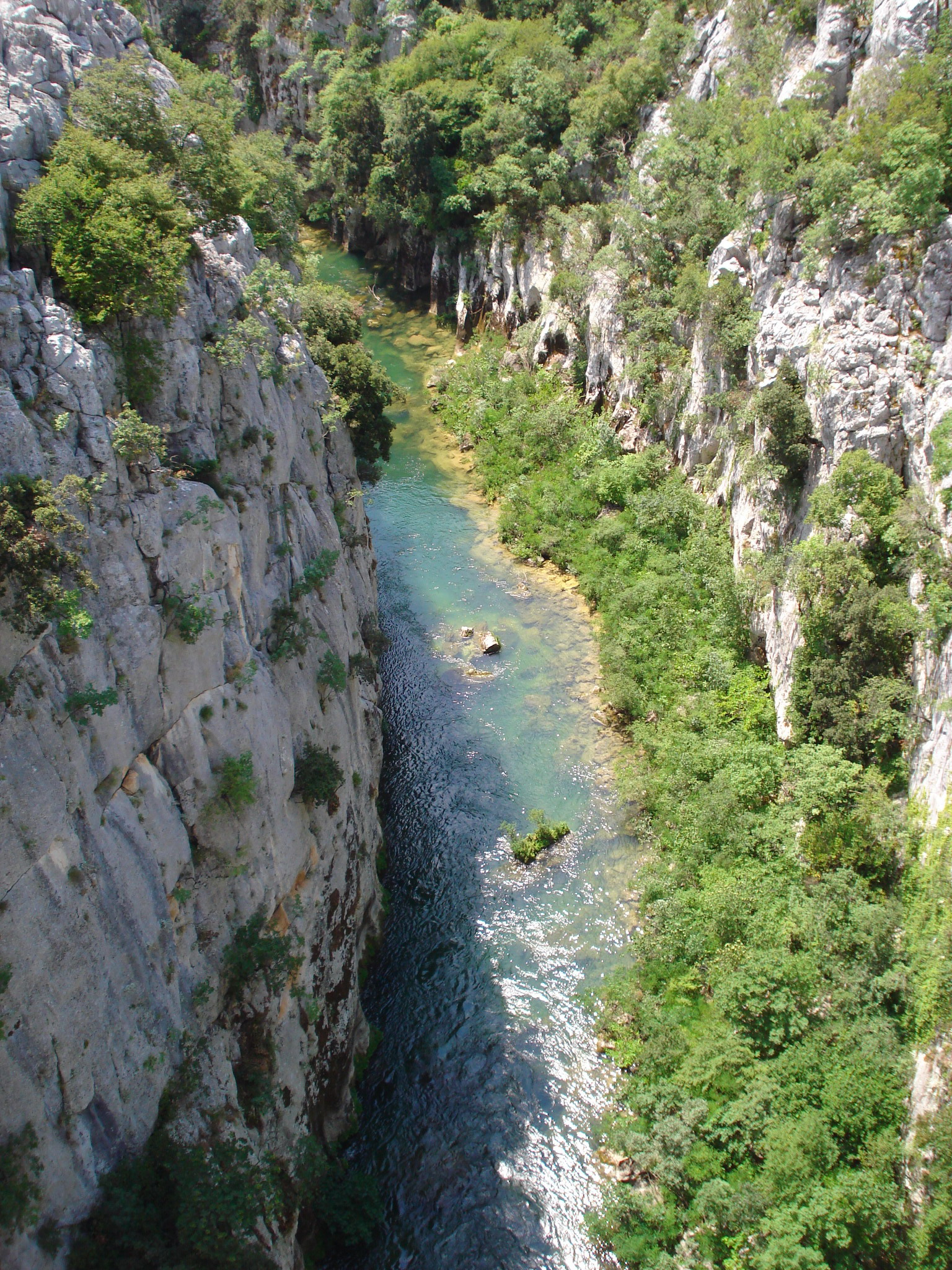
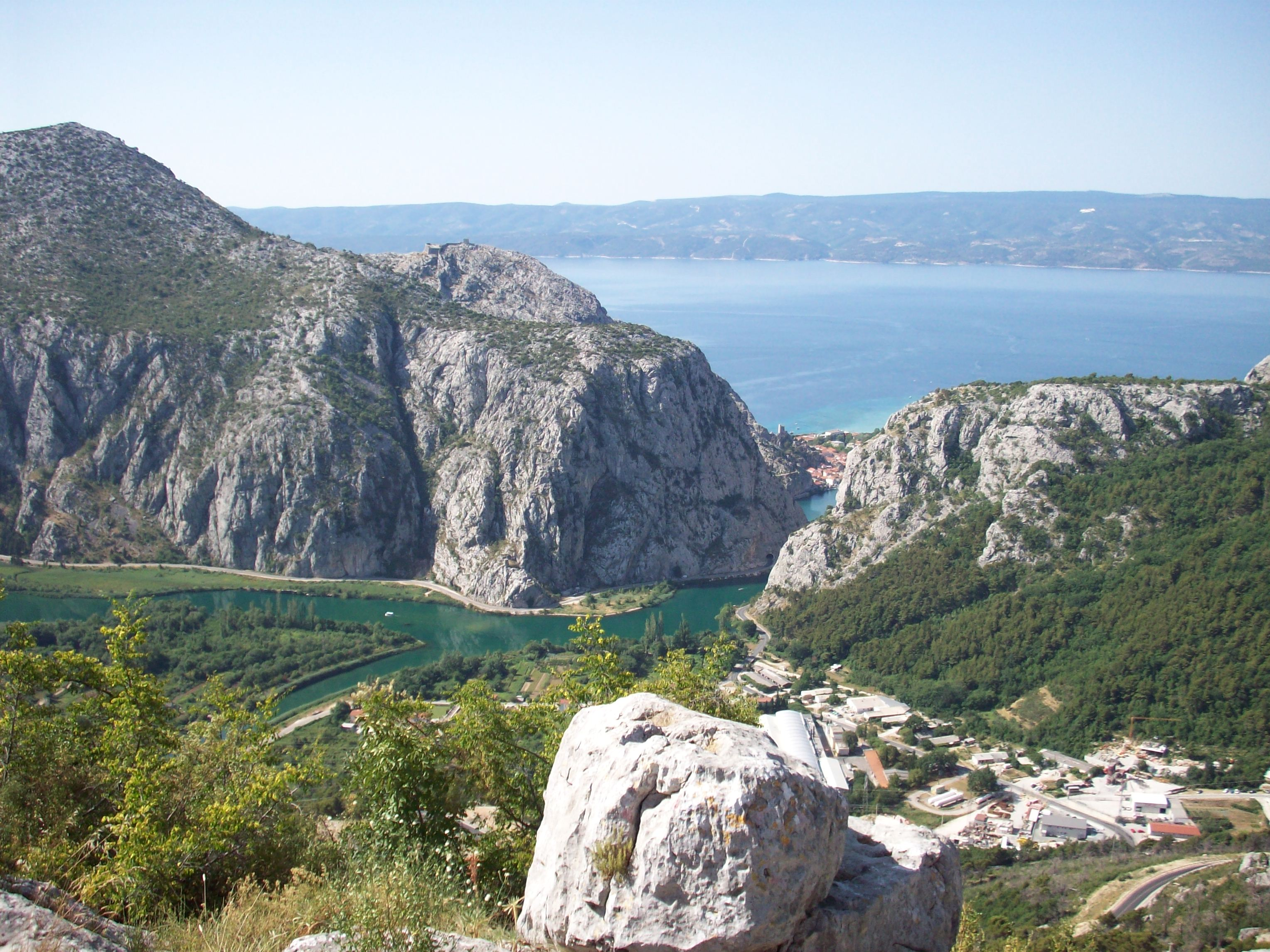
Top row: The source is a karst spring. Peruća Lake. Cetina at Sinjsko polje.
Bottom row: Near Trilj. Canyon near Šestanovac. Mouth of the river at Omiš.

== History and archaeology ==
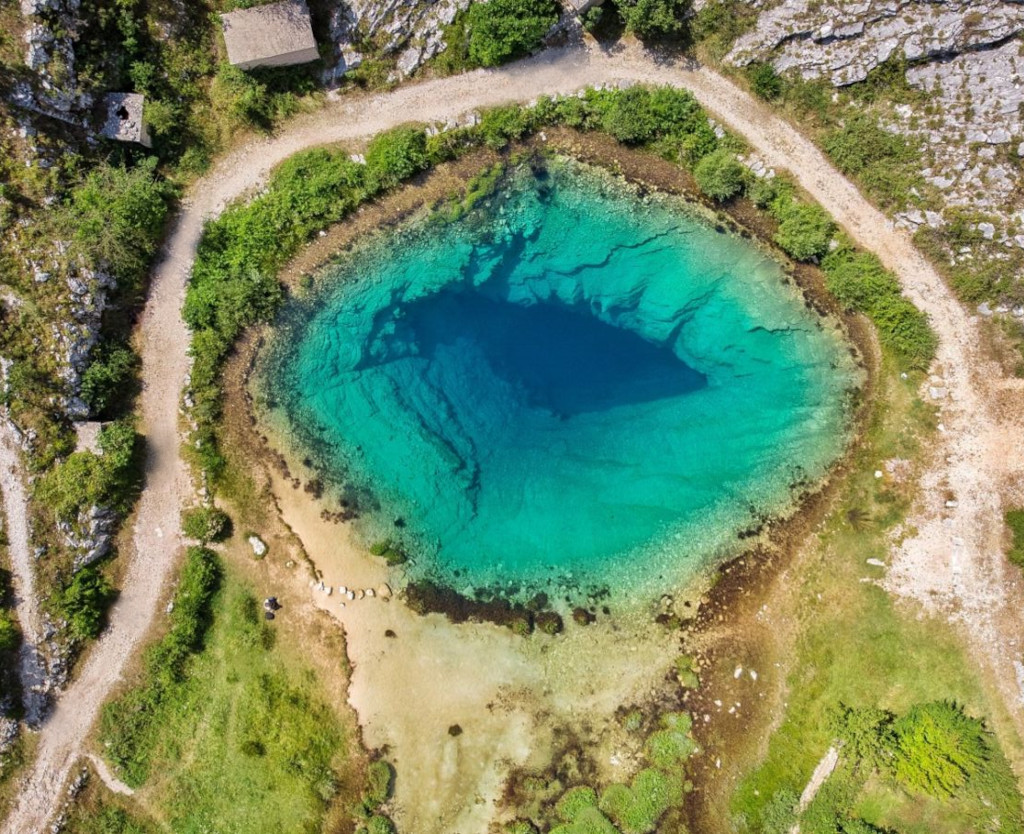
River source

The Cetina Valley and the narrow passage at Klis have always functioned as a principal trade route between the Croatian coast and hinterland. Strategically, it has been pivotal to the development, not only of the Balkans, but also of significant parts of Europe. The earliest evidence for agricultural activity is from the Early Neolithic in the upper part of the valley. In the Early Bronze Age the Cetina culture, a geographically pervasive group with contacts throughout the Adriatic basin, became dominant. Extensive mound fields are recorded on the lower valley slopes at several locations around Cetina, Vrlika and Bajagić. As in other parts of Europe, the river appears to have been the focus of the intentional deposition of artifacts throughout prehistory. This is particularly true at the confluence of the Cetina and Ruda rivers at Trilj.

The area is intimately associated with the heartland of the Delmatae and the area's strategic importance is emphasised by the citing of the legionary fortress at Tilurium (Gardun), just above today's city of Trilj, which guards the entrance to the valley from the south and the approach to the provincial capital at Salona.

During the early medieval period, toponymic evidence suggests that the Cetina Valley and perhaps the river itself became a frontier between Slavic and Late Roman power. The area around Sinj eventually emerged as a centre of Slavic power and ultimately established itself as a heartland of the Early Croatian State, especially in the areas of its upper flow.

During later periods the area was highly contested and passed between a number of regional and local powers before conquest by the Ottoman Empire during the early 16th century. After this it retained a frontier role between Ottoman Empire and Republic of Venice until the reconquest of the area 150 years later.

Today canyon of the river Cetina is very popular among tourists looking for adventure activities like rafting, canyoning, zip-line, rock climbing, kayaking and other outdoor activities.
