= Bajagić, Croatia =

Settlement in Split-Dalmatia County, Croatia

Bajagić
- Settlement
- Interactive map of Bajagić
- Location of Bajagić in Croatia
- Coordinates: 43°45′40″N 16°39′50″E
- Country: Croatia
- County: Split-Dalmatia
- City: Sinj

Area
  - Total: 24.9 km^{2} (9.6 sq mi)

Population (2021)
  - Total: 496
  - Density: 19.9/km^{2} (51.6/sq mi)
- Time zone: UTC+1 (CET)
  - Summer (DST): UTC+2 (CEST)
- Postal code: 21238 Otok
- Area code: +385 (0)21

Bajagić is a village within the area of the City of Sinj in Croatia. In 2021, its population was 496.

== History ==
The local parish was established in 1780, after the end of the Ottoman rule. The parish church of St. Nicholas with an adjacent early medieval cemetery is located in the village.

== Demographics ==
Bajagić: Population trends 1857–2021
v

population	551	632	705	853	909	982	956	974	936	973	1007	906	868	844	696	562	496
	1857	1869	1880	1890	1900	1910	1921	1931	1948	1953	1961	1971	1981	1991	2001	2011	2021

Sources: Croatian Bureau of Statistics publications
