= Glavice, Croatia =

Village in Split-Dalmatia County, Croatia

Glavice
- Settlement
- Interactive map of Glavice
- Location of Glavice in Croatia
- Coordinates: 43°42′14″N 16°39′07″E
- Country: Croatia
- County: Split-Dalmatia
- City: Sinj

Area
  - Total: 15.8 km^{2} (6.1 sq mi)

Population (2021)
  - Total: 3,597
  - Density: 228/km^{2} (590/sq mi)
- Time zone: UTC+1 (CET)
  - Summer (DST): UTC+2 (CEST)
- Postal code: 21230 Sinj
- Area code: +385 (0)21

Glavice is a village within the City of Sinj in Croatia. In 2021, its population was 3597.

== History ==
Around eighty early medieval east-west oriented graves have been found at five locations in Glavice in the hamlet of Poljaci, dated to the turn of the 8th and 9th centuries and from the first half of the 9th to early 10th century. Artifacts included small daggers, jewelry, and ceramic vessels. Several of these graves had the Greek cross (crux quadrata), the St. Andrew's cross (crux decussata), or the Maltese cross carved on the inside of the grave, which represents the local specificity of medieval cemeteries in the narrower area of the Cetina region.

== Demographics ==
Glavice: Population trends 1857–2021
v

population	1202	1265	1349	1371	1630	2187	2226	2578	2741	2914	3093	3376	3775	4055	3876	3753	3597
	1857	1869	1880	1890	1900	1910	1921	1931	1948	1953	1961	1971	1981	1991	2001	2011	2021

Sources: Croatian Bureau of Statistics publications
