= Peruća Lake =

- Perućko jezero (Croatian)
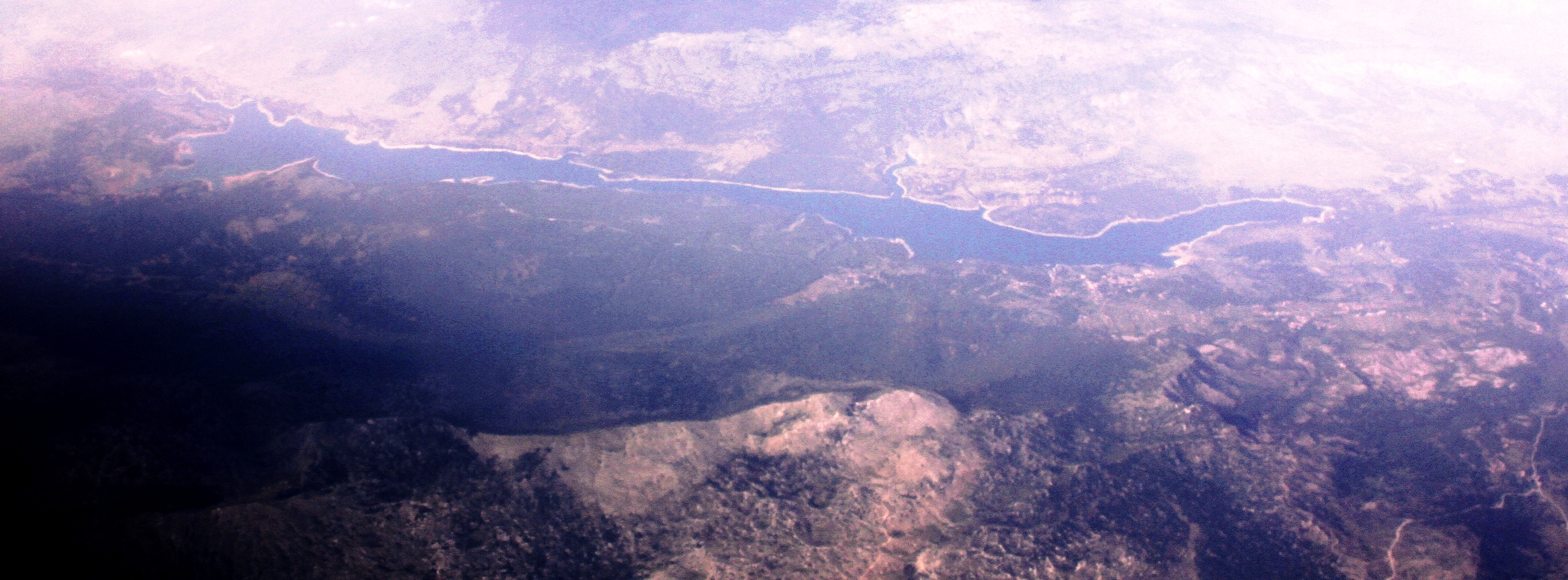

- Location within Croatia
- Interactive map of Peruća Lake
- Location: Split-Dalmatia County, Dalmatia
- Coordinates: 43°51′N 16°31′E
- Type: artificial lake
- Primary inflows: Cetina
- Primary outflows: Cetina
- Catchment area: 3,700 km^{2} (1,400 sq mi)
- Basin countries: Croatia
- Max. length: 18 km (11 mi)
- Max. width: 3 km (1.9 mi)
- Surface area: 13.0 km^{2} (5.0 sq mi)
- Max. depth: 64 m (210 ft)
- Water volume: 565 hm^{3} (458,000 acre⋅ft)
- Surface elevation: 360 m (1,180 ft)

Lake Peruća or Peruča (Croatian: Jezero Peruča or Perućko jezero) is the second largest artificial lake in Croatia, after Lake Dubrava. It is located in the Split-Dalmatia County.

== Location ==
Located in inland Dalmatia, south of the source of the River Cetina, northeast of the State route D1 between the towns of Sinj and Vrlika.

The Lake is on the course of the River Cetina, bounded by Svilaja mountain to the southwest and Dinara mountain to the northeast.

== Building of the dam ==
The Lake is fed by water from the Cetina River, and drains an area of 3,700 km^{2}, while the total catchment area of the Cetina is around 12,000 km^{2}. The annual discharge is around 105 m^{3} s^{−1} as a consequence of a mean annual rainfall of 1380 mm. This is why the artificial lake was created by building a dam on Cetina River in 1958, some 25 km downstream. The Peruća lake was the first large reservoir created in karst and the first remote reservoir in the Cetina Hydropower System that makes use of its 390 m total elevation drop. The reservoir was impounded in the Cetina canyon upstream of the Hrvatačko Polje (a karst field) by the construction of the 63 m high Peruća earth dam and grout curtain. The Peruća lake reservoir active storage is about 37% of the mean annual inflow, and it considerably affects the Cetina flow regulation at the downstream power plants between Sinjsko Polje (field) and the Adriatic. The head concentration which is the result of Peruća Dam construction is used by the Peruća Hydroelectric Power Plant. The Peruća lake reservoir's active storage is 565 million m^{3} at the maximum operating level at an elevation of 361.50 m.a.s.l. The maximum reservoir flood level is 362.00 m.a.s.l. This was considered a great achievement at that time. The majority of the catchment drains calcareous are rocks of the Cretaceous period, predominantly limestone. Peruća lake is the third largest lake in Croatia by size. It is spread over 10–20 km², and is 60–70 m at its maximum depth, depending on quantity of rain/snow in winter.

Building the dam on the Cetina and creating the lake, has limited flooding downstream. Dalmatia has secured a greater energy supply.

Before it was built, the State of SFRY nationalised land which belonged to the inhabitants of the neighbouring settlements of Vrlika, Garjak, Kosore, Ježević, Laktac, Dabar, Vučipolje, Zasiok, Gornji Bitelić, Donji Bitelić, Rumin, Hrvace, Satrić, Potravlje, Maljkovo, Otišić and Maovice. In the middle of the lake, there was an old Orthodox Dragović Monastery. Before the artificial lake for the hydroelectric power station at Peruća was created, the Dragović monastery was moved to a hill not far from the old fortress at Gradina.

== Croatian War of Independence ==
The Peruća Dam was gravely damaged during the Croatian War of Independence, when on January 28, 1993, in the aftermath of Operation Maslenica, at 10:48 a.m., the dam was blown up in an intentional effort to destroy it by Serbian/Yugoslav army forces. They mined it with 30 tons of explosive and detonated the charges with the intention of harming thousands of Croatian civilians downstream. The explosion caused heavy damage, but ultimately failed to demolish the dam. The Croatian communities in the Cetina valley (from Sinj to Omiš) were nevertheless in great danger of being flooded by water from Peruća lake. The actions of the UNPROFOR officer Mark Nicholas Gray (Major in the British Royal Marines) prevented the disaster at the Dam because before the explosion he had raised the spillway channel and reduced the level of water in the lake by four meters. This prevented total collapse of the dam and engineers were quickly able to maintain the integrity of the dam. Subsequently, the Croatian forces intervened and recovered the dam and the surrounding area. On January 29, a small Croatian army team, supported by engineers previously employed in dam maintenance, verified that the main outlet valve could be accessed. It was accessible but stuck due to two years of neglect, loaded with 700 tons of hydrostatic pressure. The engineers then refilled the oil in the hydraulic pumps and used an UNPROFOR engine to restart them. This allowed for the lake to finally drain into Cetina, at a rate of 187 m^{3}/s.

In August 1993, HEP started to repair the dam. The works on the dam were completed some time after the war ended, in May 1996.

In 2002, Colonel Gray was awarded the MBE (although not for his actions at Peruća). In 2011, Croatian President Ivo Josipović decorated four Croatian soldiers for valor in combat at Peruća. On 27 January 2013, the 20th anniversary of the HV recapture of the Peruća dam, Gray was awarded Order of Duke Domagoj by president Josipović.

== Gallery ==
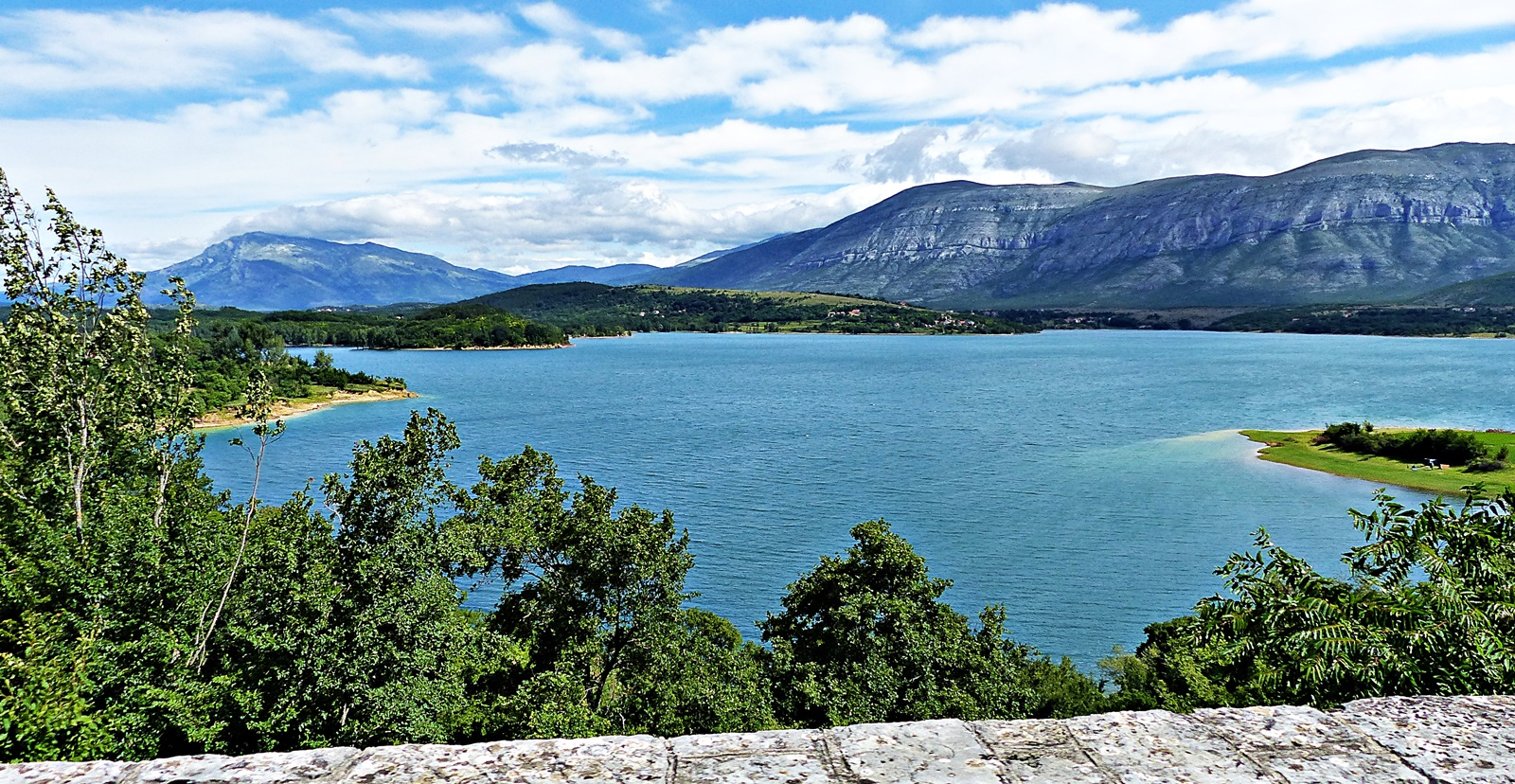
Peruća Lake

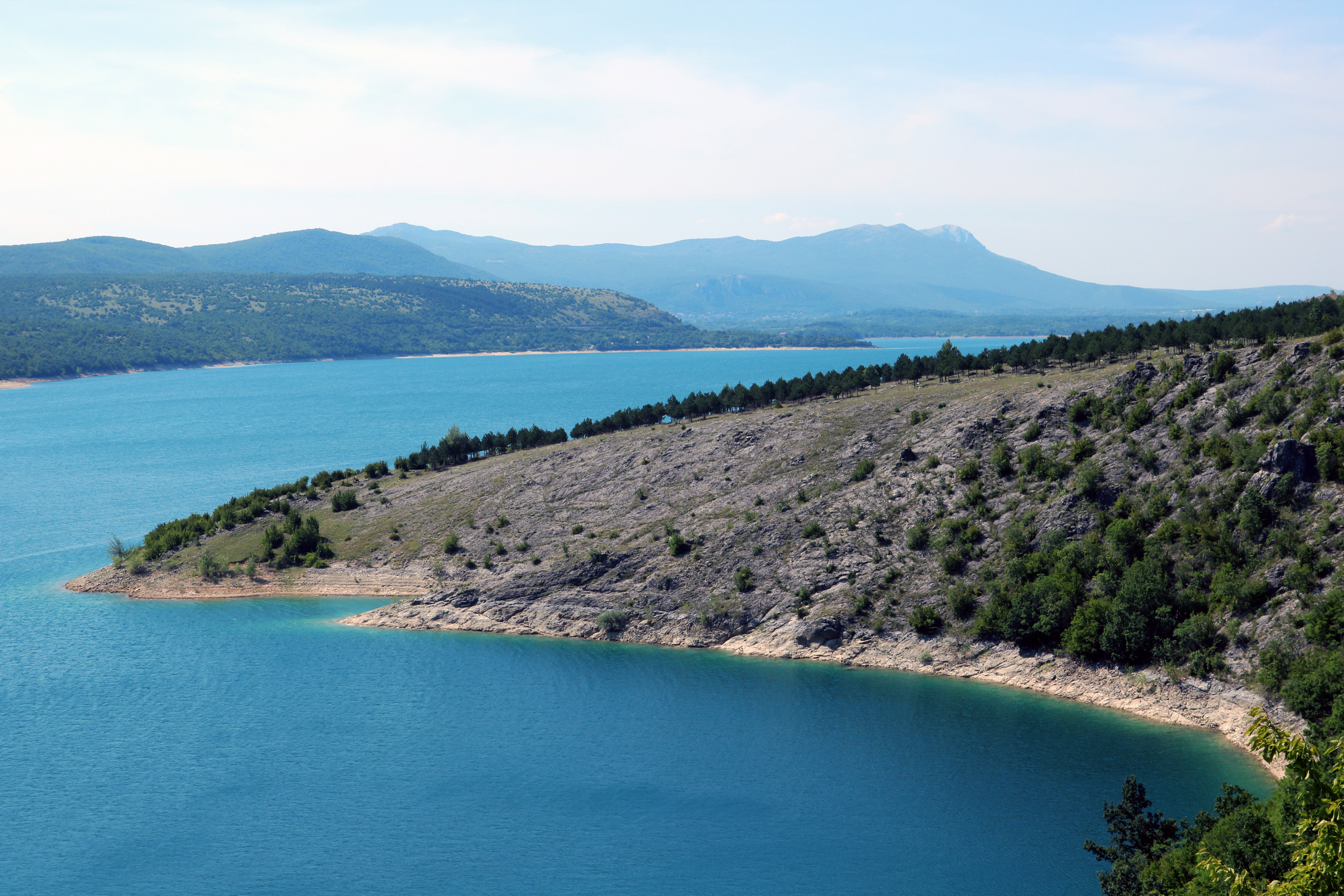
Peruća Lake

== See also ==
- List of lakes in Croatia
- List of dam failures

== Notes ==
- Monster of Peruća lake is a snake Elaphe quatuorlineata (Croatian: Kravosas or dalmatinski udav), which can grow to more than 3 m in length. It appears rarely on the lake. Every 10 to 15 years there is an eyewitness who claims its existence. It is the biggest European snake.
