= Civljane =

Civljane Цивљане (Serbian)
- Municipality
- Općina Civljane; Општина Цивљане; Municipality of Civljane
- Interactive map of Civljane
- Location within Croatia
- Coordinates: 43°57′N 16°24′E
- Country: Croatia
- Region: Dalmatia (Dalmatian Hinterland)
- County: Šibenik-Knin County

Government
  - Mayor: Sanja Bjelobrk (Ind.)

Area
  - Municipality: 82.9 km^{2} (32.0 sq mi)
  - Urban: 21.2 km^{2} (8.2 sq mi)

Population (2021)
  - Municipality: 171
  - Density: 2.06/km^{2} (5.34/sq mi)
  - Urban: 47
  - Urban density: 2.2/km^{2} (5.7/sq mi)
- Time zone: UTC+1 (CET)
  - Summer (DST): UTC+2 (CEST)
- Postal code: 22300 Knin
- Website: civljane.hr

Civljane (Serbian Cyrillic: Цивљане) is a village and municipality in Šibenik-Knin County, Croatia. With only 239 inhabitants, Civljane was the smallest municipality in Croatia by population in 2011. Civljane is an underdeveloped municipality which is statistically classified as the First Category Area of Special State Concern by the Government of Croatia.

== History ==
In the 9th century, probably during the time of Duke Branimir of Croatia, the Church of Holy Salvation (Crkva sv. Spasa) was built in Cetina, near Vrlika, then called Vrh Rike. It is the only Croatian early medieval church with almost entirely preserved walls.

The Serbian Orthodox Church of Holy Salvation on the spring of the Cetina River was built in 1940, founded by Marko Četnik and his wife Jelena. The church was rebuilt in 1974.

== Population ==
As of 2011, there are 188 Serbs, making up 78.7% of the population, and 44 Croats, making up 19.7% of the population, and 7 others. There are 216 Croatian speakers, and 4 Serbian speakers.

The average age of residents is 71, making Civljane the oldest municipality in Croatia.

In 2021, the municipality had 171 residents in the following 2 settlements:

- Cetina, population 124
- Civljane, population 47
Civljane: Population trends 1857–2021
v

population	1333	1325	1242	1677	1903	2049	2324	2473	2484	2617	2797	2365	1958	1672	137	239	171
	1857	1869	1880	1890	1900	1910	1921	1931	1948	1953	1961	1971	1981	1991	2001	2011	2021

Sources: Croatian Bureau of Statistics publications

== Languages ==
Serbian Language, along with Serbian Cyrillic alphabet, is the second official language in the municipality alongside the Croatian language which is official in the whole country. As of 2023, most of the legal requirements for the fulfillment of bilingual standards have not been carried out. There is no Cyrillic signage on official buildings, street signs or seals. Cyrillic is not used on any official documents, nor are there public legal and administrative employees proficient in the script. Preserving traditional Serbian place names and assigning street names to Serbian historical figures is legally mandated, but not carried out.

== Geography ==
The municipality is located in the Dalmatian Hinterland, north of the town of Vrlika and Peruća Lake, on the field near the spring of Cetina River, on altitude of approximately 400 m, just under south base of mountain Dinara. The settlement of Civljane itself covers an area of 17.80 km^{2}. Parts of the settlement are hamlets:

- Čitluk
- Dubrava pod Kozjakom
- Kotluša
- Kozjak
- Marjevci pod Kozjakom

== See also ==
- Vrlika
- Glavaš - Dinarić Fortress
- Church of Holy Salvation
- Orthodox church of Holy Salvation
