= Bodrožić =

Bodrožić is a surname found among Croats and Serbs.

The surname is found in the Dalmatian hinterland, in the villages of Laktac, Koljane, Kosore, Biočić, and Žitnić. A family migrated to Sajković from Koljane in the 19th century. The Orthodox Bodrožić (Serbian Cyrillic: Бодрожић) have the slava (patron saint) of St. Stephen, except for those in Kosore, which have St. Sava.

- Ivana Bodrožić (born 1982), Croatian writer and poet
- Josip Bodrožić (born 1973), Australian-Croatian kickboxer
- Marica Bodrožić (born 1973), Croatian-born German writer
- Milica Bodrožić, Serbian writer
