= Prozor Fortress =

Medieval fortress in Croatia

Prozor Fortress Tvrđava Prozor - Gradina
- Vrlika, in Split-Dalmatia County; Croatia
- Prozor Fortress seen from the town of Vrlika

Site information
- Type: Stronghold, Castle, Fortress
- Controlled by: List of rulers 1.) Small stronghold (Gradina): 3rd century BC - 12 BC Illyrian tribe of Dalmatae; Roman Empire; 640-864 Dukes of Croatia; 864-925 House of Trpimirović; 925 Kingdom of Croatia ruled by King Tomislav; 925-1102 Croatian kings from House of Trpimirović; 1102-1406 Croatian nobility during union between Kingdom of Croatia and Kingdom of Hungary; 2.) Prozor Fortress: 1406-1416 Grand Duke of Bosnia Hrvoje Vukčić Hrvatinić; 1416-1434 Croatian noble Prince Ivan III Nelipac; 1434-1440 Croatian noble Ivan Frankopan and his widow; 1440-1522 Mihača (Mikac) Nikolin Vitturi from Trogir, commissioner of King Sigismund; 1522-1688 Ottoman Empire; 1688-1797 Republic of Venice; 3.) Fortress loses its strategic importance: 1797-1805 Austrian Empire as a part of Holy Roman Empire; 1805-1813 First French Empire under Napoleon Bonaparte; 1813-1918 Austrian Empire
- Open to the public: Yes
- Condition: Ruined, slightly renovated

Location
- Coordinates: 43.9138°N 16.3951°E

Site history
- Built: 3rd century BC ?, expended in 1406
- Built by: small stronghold by Dalmatae expended by Hrvoje Vukčić
- Materials: Limestone

Prozor Fortress (Croatian: Tvrđava Prozor or Gradina) is a medieval fortress situated in the continental part of Split-Dalmatia County, in inland Dalmatia, just above the town of Vrlika in Croatia. From its origin as a small stronghold built by the ancient Illyrian tribe Dalmatae, it developed into a fortress in the 15th century, during the reign of Bosnian feudal lord Hrvoje Vukčić Hrvatinić.

== Location ==
Prozor Fortress sits prominently above the town of Vrlika. It was chain link of near by forts like fort Glavaš - Dinarić and Potravnik. The closest large towns are Sinj, Knin, and Drniš. Prozor Fortress also has views of the Peruća Lake (Perućko jezero) and mountains Dinara and Kamešnica to the east and mountain Svilaja to the southwest. Prozor Fortress is made of stone like other fortresses in Dalmatia. It is partially restored, and entrance is free of charge. The way up to Prozor Fortress starts at the Roman Catholic parish church in Vrlika. It takes a 1.5-kilometre (0.9 mi) car ride towards small village of Maovice, followed by a 25-minute walk along a dirt trail.

== History ==
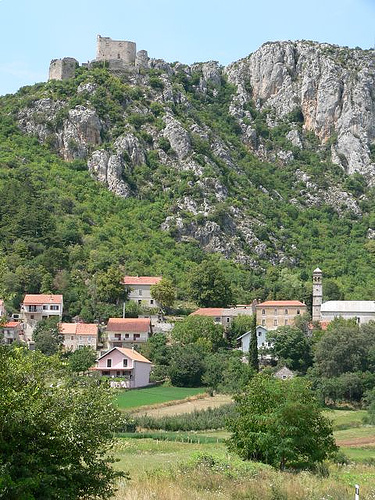
Prozor Fortress above the town of Vrlika

Prior to the arrival of the South Slavs, the Dalmatae are said to have lived in the region. The known history of Prozor Fortress begins parallel with the history of Vrlika in the 7th century, when the Croats moved there and formed a village on the spring of the river Cetina, in a field below the mountain Dinara. In the 9th century probably during the time of Duke Branimir of Littoral Croatian Duchy, the old Croatian Catholic Church of Holy Salvation, Cetina (Croatian: Crkva Sv. Spasa) was built near Vrlika, then called Vrh Rike.

After the crowning of Ladislaus as the Hungarian King in Zadar in 1403, and in political maneuvering against his arch political rival and enemy, king Sigismund, he appointed Hrvatinić as his deputy for Croatia and Dalmatia as he promised earlier. In 1406, king Ladislaus of Naples gifted Prozor Fortress, at that time Castrum Werhlychky, as a center of Vrlička župa to the Hrvoje Vukčić.

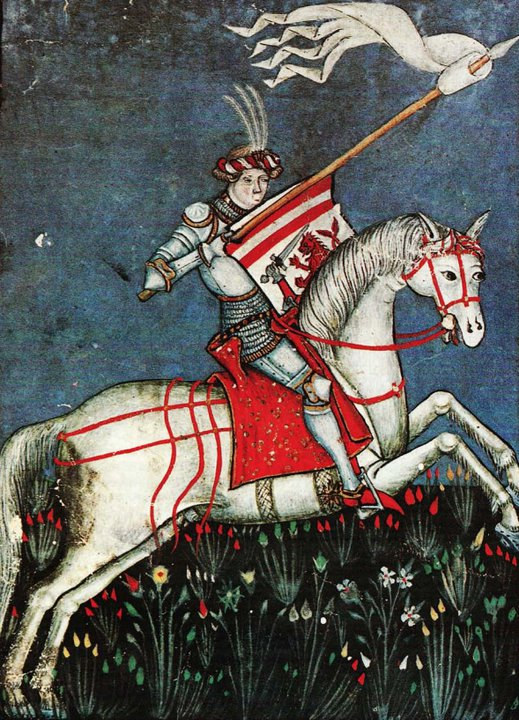
Hrvoje Vukčić Hrvatinić expanded Prozor fortress.

Hrvoje Vukčić Hrvatinić was most powerful Bosnian nobleman and magnate of his time, and carried a title of "Grand Duke of Bosnia, Knyaz of Donji Kraji, and Duke of Split" (later Herzog of Split), and now he was made by Ladislaus his "deputy for this Dalmatian territory, calling him his Vicar General for the regions of Slavonia (in partibus Sclavonie)". He was the most prominent member of House of Hrvatinić, one of the most important of three feudal families in medieval Bosnia at the time, beside royal dynasty.

At the beginning of the 15th century, Hrvoje Vukčić fortified and strengthened the Prozor Fortress over the Vrlika valley to defend inhabitants from the invasion by the Ottoman Empire. After 1416, and Hrvoje Vukčić death, his son Balša Hercegović was unable to hold Prozor Fortress, which then passed to Ivaniš Nelipić, and later to Ivan Frankopan.

In 1421, King Sigismund donated Vrlika with the Prozor Fortress to Mihača Nikolin Vitturi, but Ivaniš Nelipić refused to hand over the fortress. When wealthy Prince Ivaniš Nelipić, the last male member of Frankopan's illustrious clan, died in 1434, the problem of inheritance became acute. According to his will, his only daughter, Princess Catherine or Margarita Nelipić, was to inherit all of his extensive possessions from the Velebit ranges to Cetina river. Her patrimony was argued and eventually shared by Frankopan. In spite of the legality of this bequest, and his consent to the marriage upon request of the late Ivaniš Nelipić, king Sigismund denounced the testament and demanded that Frankopan turn over to him the legacy of his wife's inheritance. When Frankopan refused to obey, Sigismund proclaimed him a rebel and deprived him of all honors and possessions. After that the fortress was lost to Venetian noble Mihača (Mikac) Nikolin Vitturi from Trogir, who was a commissioner of king Sigismund.

The Turks invaded the fortress in 1522, and held it until 1688. After the fortress was taken, the Turks, disregarding the conditions of its surrender, massacred all within it. After the Turks, the fortress belonged to the Republic of Venice, then to the Austrian Empire, when it lost its main strategic importance. From 1805 to 1813, it was under French rule, and from 1813 to 1918 it again under Austrian rule, as was all Croatia.

== Architecture ==
Layout of Prozor Fortress

Prozor Fortress was built on isolated rock, detached from the craggy cliff on the end of mountain Svilaja range of hills. The remains of the Prozor Fortress are the ruins of a spacious residential building, a water tank, stone walls and a chapel. The Prozor Fortress was expended while it was owned by Hrvoje Vukčić Hrvatinić at the end of 14th and early 15th centuries from the small stronghold built by the Illyrian tribe of Dalmatae. In Turkish times the mahala, or the housing area of Vrlika fortress, developed around it. Prozor Fortress is dominated by the tall keep or donjon, around which is an open court with houses and a chapel. The courtyard is defended by the lower ramparts and a round tower. A drawbridge once gave access to the keep. Today's condition of Prozor Fortress is poorly, as the fortress is ruined, although slightly renovated.

== See also ==
- List of castles in Croatia
- List of rulers of Croatia

== Sources ==
- Regional Surveys of the World (1996). Eastern Europe and the Commonwealth of Independent States, Fourth Edition. London: Europa Publications Limited. ISBN 1-85743-058-1.
- Soldo, Josip Ante (2001). Vrlika - Monografija (in Croatian). Šibenik: Viatoni. ISBN 953-98670-0-2.
- Wilkinson, Sir John Gardner (2005) [1848]. Dalmatia and Montenegro: with a journey to Mostar in Herzegovia...Vol I. London: John Murray – Harvard College Library. ISBN 1-4021-8253-8.
