= Bitelić =

Bitelić may refer to:

- Gornji Bitelić, a hamlet near Hrvace, Croatia
- Donji Bitelić, a hamlet near Hrvace, Croatia
