= Otišić =

- Location within Croatia
- Coordinates: 43°51′N 16°27′E
- Country: Croatia
- County: Split-Dalmatia
- City: Vrlika

Area
  - Total: 51.0 km^{2} (19.7 sq mi)

Population (2021)
  - Total: 39
  - Density: 0.76/km^{2} (2.0/sq mi)
- Time zone: UTC+1 (CET)
  - Summer (DST): UTC+2 (CEST)

Otišić is a small village in the Split-Dalmatia County, Croatia. Located in inland Dalmatia, south of Vrlika, on the State route D1 between towns of Sinj and Vrlika. Otišić is a settlement in the Vrlika municipality, with a population of about 20, the majority of whom are ethnic Serbs (2001 census). The 1991 census, held before the War in Croatia (1991–1995), registered Otišić with a population of 1,006, out of which 996 were ethnic Serbs. During the War, the village was held by the Republic of Serb Krajina. In 2007, the settlement, which had up until then been a part of Sinj, was joined into Vrlika. Otišić spreads on 51.01 km^{2}, between mountain Svilaja on the southwest and 25-km long Peruća Lake - Power Plant Accumulation on the northeast. There are the following hamlets or geographical parts of the village: Draga Otišićka, Gaj, Poljana, Ječmište, Krivošija, Dubrava, Ograde, Poljice Otišićko, Rudopolje Sinjsko, Svilaja, Ševina Njiva, Tavan, and Vlake.

The village of Otišić was inhabited by a large number of Serb brotherhoods, such as: Stojisavljević, Rnić, Borković, Dragić, Ustić, Arambasić, Gajić, Petrović, Meljanac, Krivosić, Zagorac, Krunić, Grubić, Vujasin and others. In the village there is a small Eastern Orthodox Church (crkva sv. Arhanđela Mihaila), which was built in 1889. There is some archeological interest of the area because of finding site from Stone Age and Roman Empire, and remains of an early Christian Church.

== See also ==
- Dabar, Split-Dalmatia County
- Laktac, Split-Dalmatia County
- Koljane, Split-Dalmatia County
- Sušci, Split-Dalmatia County
