= Hrvace =

Municipality in Split-Dalmatia, Croatia

- Municipality
- Location of Hrvace in Croatia
- Coordinates: 43°45′36″N 16°37′12″E
- Country: Croatia
- Region: Dalmatia
- County: Split-Dalmatia County

Area
  - Municipality: 207.8 km^{2} (80.2 sq mi)
  - Urban: 20.0 km^{2} (7.7 sq mi)

Population (2021)
  - Municipality: 3,144
  - Density: 15.13/km^{2} (39.19/sq mi)
  - Urban: 1,483
  - Urban density: 74.2/km^{2} (192/sq mi)
- Postal code: 21233
- Website: opcina-hrvace.hr

Hrvace is a village and a municipality in Croatia in the Split-Dalmatia County.

== Demographics ==
In the 2011 census, it had a total population of 3,617, in the following settlements:

- Dabar, population 22
- Donji Bitelić, population 317
- Gornji Bitelić, population 192
- Hrvace, population 1,566
- Laktac, population 2
- Maljkovo, population 76
- Potravlje, population 651
- Rumin, population 190
- Satrić, population 456
- Vučipolje, population 107
- Zasiok, population 38

In the same census, 98% were Croats.

Hrvace: Population trends 1857–2021
v

population	5056	5919	5742	6483	7065	7512	7392	7706	7810	8212	7137	6692	6206	5296	4116	3617	3144
	1857	1869	1880	1890	1900	1910	1921	1931	1948	1953	1961	1971	1981	1991	2001	2011	2021

Sources: Croatian Bureau of Statistics publications

== Geography ==
The village sits on the D1 road between Sinj and Vrlika on the edge of the small karst field and under Svilaja mountain. The municipality has a lot of natural sites such as the Peruća Lake, Miloš Lake, Orlove Stine (Eagle's Cliffs) and the Cetina river.

== History ==
The name Hrvace comes from the verb "Hrvati" (Croats). The time of the village's first inhabitants is unknown.

Hrvace area was a battleground during the Croatian War of Independence in 1991 and 1992. Every village of the municipality took heavy Serb damage, forcing the large part of the population to move out. The most notable battle includes the one for Peruća dam, where the Serbian Army's goal was mining it, eventually flooding the large part of the Sinj karst field and field-side villages and towns. In 1993, Croatian Army took back the dam, threw out the Serbian Army and prevented heavy damage.

== Economy ==
The food (meat) industry, stone excavation industry and the Peruća power plant are the major economical activities in the municipality.

== Sports ==
NK Hrvace, Third Division South, 3.HNL South champions in 2007/08

Paragliding klub Hrvace

== Education ==
Osnovna škola Dinka Šimunovića (Dinko Šimunović elementary school)
