= Museum of Genocide Victims =

Museum of Genocide Victims may refer to:

- Museum of Occupations and Freedom Fights, Vilnius, Lithuania
- Belgrade Museum of Genocide Victims, see Veljko Đurić Mišina, director

== See also ==
- Genocide
- List of Holocaust memorials and museums
