= Church of Our Lady of Rosary, Vrlika =

Parish Church of Our Lady of Rosary
- Župna crkva Gospe od Ružarija
- Location: Vrlika
- Country: Croatia
- Denomination: Roman Catholic

History
- Status: Parish church
- Dedicated: 1898; 128 years ago

Architecture
- Functional status: Active
- Groundbreaking: 1876
- Completed: 1898

Administration
- Archdiocese: Archdiocese of Split-Makarska

The Church of Our Lady of Rosary (Croatian: Crkva Gospe od Ružarija) is a Roman Catholic church in Vrlika, Croatia. It is located in the center of town.

== Description ==
The church has marble altar with picture of Lady with Jesus in arms. The picture was probably procured in the 18th century in Venice by Filip Grabovac.

It has few statues: statue of Saints Peter and Paul, statue of Saint Anthony, statue of Saint Anne and statue of Sacred Heart.

== History ==
The church was built from 1876 till 1898, when it was dedicated.

During the Croatian War of Independence, statues of Saints Peter and Paul were damaged, because Serbs obtruncate heads.
