= Veliki Kozjak =

Mountain in Croatia

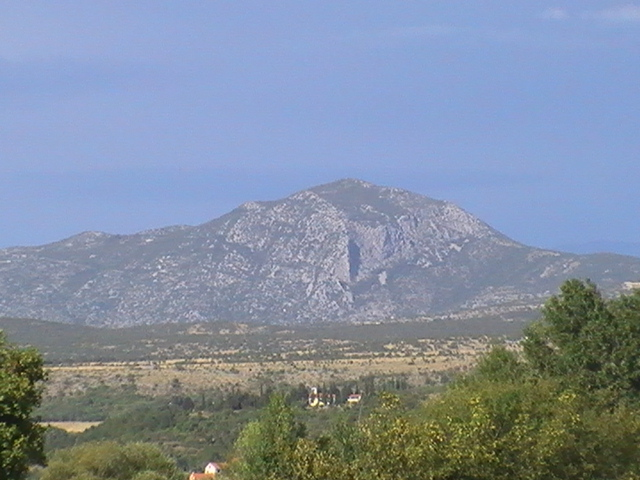

Highest point
- Elevation: 1,207 m (3,960 ft)
- Coordinates: 43°57′43″N 16°19′50″E

Geography
- Location within Croatia
- Location: Dalmatia, Croatia
- Parent range: Dinaric Alps

Veliki Kozjak or just Kozjak is a mountain cliff in Croatia, located inland of Dalmatian Zagora.

It belongs to Dinaric Alps, and stretches over small villages Polača and Kijevo between the towns of Vrlika and Knin. The highest peak of this cliff is Bat (1,207 m), and its southeast peak is Kunica (1,101 m), over the small village of Maovice.

== Gallery ==
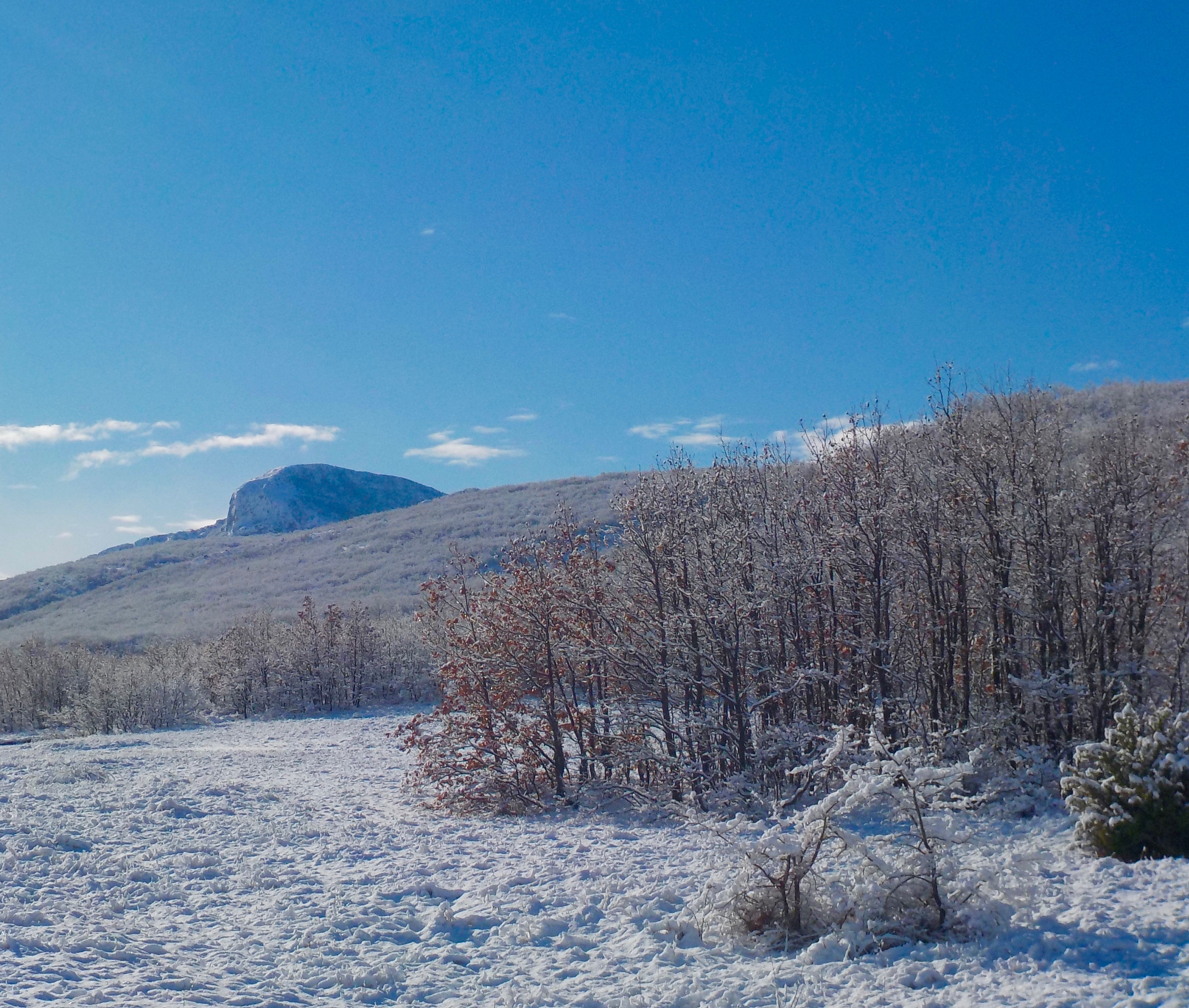
Kozjak from the north in winter

== See also ==
- List of mountains in Croatia
