= Prozor =

Prozor may refer to:

- Prozor, Bosnia and Herzegovina, a town in the Prozor-Rama municipality in Bosnia and Herzegovina
- Prozor, Croatia, a village near Otočac, Croatia
- Prozor Fortress, a fortress in Dalmatia, Croatia

== See also ==
- Ron Prosor, Israeli diplomat
