= Filip Grabovac =

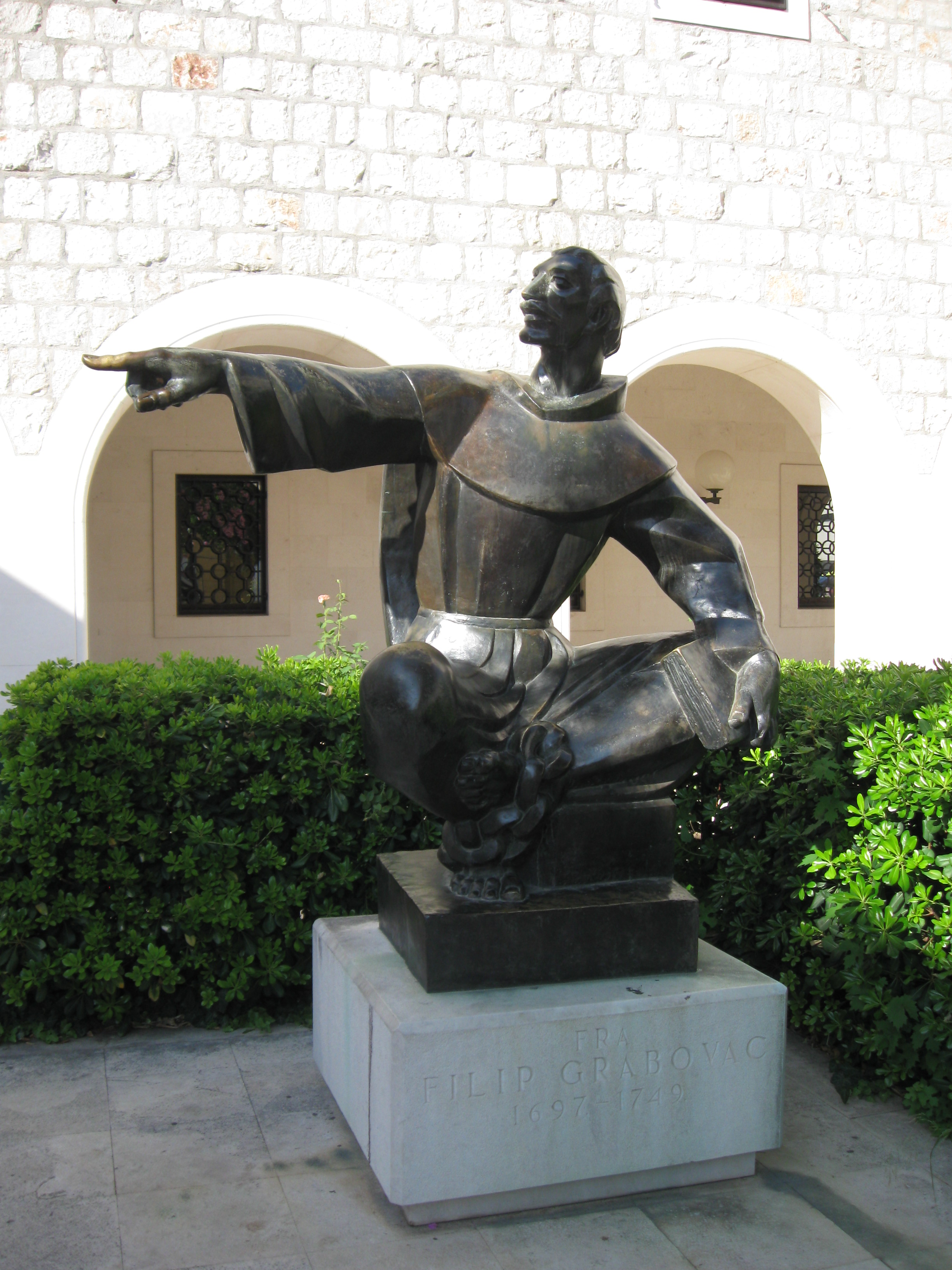
- A monument to Filip Grabovac in Split
- Born: 1697/98; Podosoje near Vrlika
- Died: 13 February 1749
- Other names: Filip Grahovac
- Occupations: Franciscan priest, professor, patriot, poet and writer

Filip Grabovac or Filip Grahovac (1697/98 – 13 February 1749) was a Croatian Franciscan priest, professor, patriot, poet and writer.

Grabovac was born in a village Podosoje near Vrlika. His schooling was at the Franciscan monastery in Brist. In 1719, he completed his novitiate. After becoming a priest, he spent some years as a lecturer. Then, for twenty years or more he served as a military chaplain for Croatian soldiers in the Venetian army (Croati à cavallo, Cavalleria croata). He had come to reside in Verona but his duty included frequent travels in northern Italy, especially Venice. This work was tough on him, and he suffered great bouts of ill health. His salary, which was the same as that of a soldier, didn't make things better, for he had to look after his horse from that same income. It was due to such diligent work and sacrifices that he became renowned in Verona and by 1747 was one of the province's most revered priests.

His songs "Slava Dalmacije" (Glory of Dalmatia) and "Od naravi i ćudi arvacke" (From Croatian nature and temper) were considered extremely patriotic. His 1747 work "Cvit razgovora naroda i jezika iliričkoga aliti arvackoga" (The Flower of Discourse among the Illyrian or Croatian People and Language), contained a reprint of a leaflet he made in 1729 in which attacked the injustice and harmfulness of the Venetian administration in Dalmatia. Because of it, Grabovac soon faced attacks from several people in Venice. He was arrested in Verona and brought to Venice, where he was put in prison. There he fell seriously ill, and was transferred first to a nearby monastery and then to the island of Santo Spirito. Soon afterwards, Grabovac succumbed to his illness and died.

Although the government burned copies of his books wherever they found them, six copies of his work somehow survived. Of the six, only two remained in their entirety. In 1951, the Croatian Academy of Sciences and Arts published an edition of Grabovac's works.
