= Dušan Bilandžić =

Croatian historian and politician

- Born: 20 July 1924; Maljkovo, Kingdom of Serbs, Croats and Slovenes (modern Croatia)
- Died: 4 March 2015 (aged 90); Zagreb, Croatia
- Education: University of Zagreb University of Belgrade
- Awards: Order of Danica Hrvatska with face of Ruđer Bošković Annual State Award for Science
- Scientific career
- Fields: Modern history
- Website: Official website

Dušan Bilandžić (20 July 1924 – 4 March 2015) was a Croatian historian and politician.

== Early life ==
He attended the lower classes of a Franciscan gymnasium in Sinj, and continued his high school education in Osijek. Before World War II, he joined the Young Communist League of Yugoslavia (SKOJ). During the war, he joined the Yugoslav Partisans in 1942 as political commesar in Slavonian partisan units. In the same year, he joined the Communist Party of Yugoslavia. In 1955 he graduated from the University of Belgrade's Law School and from 1945 until 1960 he taught military history at the Military Academy in Belgrade. After he left the army, he began working as a journalist, but soon he was employed in a trade union and in 1965 he was named member of the Trade Union Presidency of Yugoslavia as a representative of Croatia. As he worked in unions under self-management, Bilandžić continued his education. In 1965 he gained a PhD from the University of Zagreb Faculty of Economics. In 1967, after Franjo Tuđman was arrested because of undesirable political activity, Bilandžić succeeded him as the director of the Institute for the History of the Workers' Movement in Croatia. In following years he undertook various political duties and in 1974 was one of the participants in the drafting of the 1974 Yugoslav Constitution. He was a dean on the Faculty of Political Science at the University of Zagreb at the end of the 1970s and the beginning of the 1980s. He became a member of the Yugoslav Academy of Sciences and Arts (JAZU) in 1980. He became regular member of HAZU (earlier JAZU) in 1991.

== Professional work ==
Bilandžić was an enemy of centralization of Yugoslavia after Josip Broz Tito died in 1980. Since he denied the validity of Yugoslav nationality during the 1981 census, he was highly criticized by Belgrade as a separatist and Ustaše. Bilandžić stated that the category of "Yugoslav" led to the disappearance of more than 30,000 Croats in Vojvodina. He feared that the "Yugoslav" category would continue to grow, something which would call into question the entire basis of Yugoslav cultural and political policies, which were predicated on a person having a single national identification. Specifically, a loss of Croats would mean fewer people to support Croat politicians and diminution of their power base within the multinational state.

With democratic elections in Croatia in 1991, Bilandžić joined the list of Social Democratic Party of Croatia, but the election results were devastating. Since he was a good friend of Tuđman, Tuđman named him Croatian representative in Belgrade in 1991. His friendship with Tuđman was very complex, since Tuđman often criticized him, even calling him "a monster" on the TV after Operation Storm in 1995.

His main focus in history was the former Yugoslavia and the position of Croats in it. Besides writing books, he participated in writing articles for various magazines and newspapers. His greatest works are History of SFRY (1978) and Croatian Modern History (1999). Since History of SFRY was written under political censorship, in Croatian Modern History Bilandžić used his previous book as a source, but gave different comments on the same events.

== Comments ==
In 2004, in a popular Croatian talk show, Nedjeljom u 2, Bilandžić stated that Croatia had more sovereignty in the SFR Yugoslavia than it would have in the European Union.

== Public services and awards ==
Bilandžić was a member of the Steering Committee of the Croatian Mainstreem of Emigrants, member of the Commission of the Presidency of the Socialist Republic of Croatia for Pardon and member of the Presidency of the SR Croatia.

He was decorated with the Order of Danica Hrvatska with the face of Ruđer Bošković for his contribution to science, and Annual Award for Science, which he gained for his work Croatian Modern History (Zagreb, 1999). He was also a member of the State Commission for the Historical and War Victims.

== Notable works ==
- Historija Socijalističke Federativne Republike Jugoslavije (History of the Socialist Federal Republic of Yugoslavia) 1 (1978), 2 (1979), 3 (1985).
- Teorija i praksa delegatskog sistema" (Theory and Practice of Delegate System) (1979)
- Jugoslavija poslije Tita (Yugoslavia After Tito) (1985)
- Hrvatska između rata i samostalnosti (Croatia Between War and Independence) (1991)
- Hrvatska moderna povijest (Croatian Modern History; 1999)
- Rat u Hrvatskoj i Bosni i Hercegovini (War in Bosnia and Herzegovina; 1999)
- Propast Jugoslavije i stvaranje moderne Hrvatske (Failure of Yugoslavia and Creation of Modern Croatia; 2001)
- Povijest izbliza (History from Close up; 2006)
