= Veljko Đurić Mišina =

Serbian historian (born 1953)

- Вељко Ђурић Мишина
- Born: 8 January 1953 (age 73); Kosore, PR Croatia, FPR Yugoslavia
- Occupation: Historian
- Known for: History of the Serbian Orthodox Church, genocide & Holocaust studies

Veljko Đurić Mišina (Serbian Cyrillic: Вељко Ђурић Мишина; born 8 January 1953) is a Serbian historian, specializing in the history of the Serbian Orthodox Church, genocides and the Holocaust, and modern history of the Western Balkans. He is currently the director at the Museum of Genocide Victims in Belgrade.

== Biography ==
Mišina was born in the village of Kosore near Sinj, PR Croatia, FPR Yugoslavia, into a Serb family. He studied at the Philosophical Faculty at the University of Belgrade. He defended his doctorate at the University of Novi Sad. He worked at the Historical Museum of Serbia as a curator-historian between 1981 and 1997. He then worked as a teacher at the Philosophical Faculty at the University of Pristina, first as a docent, then associate professor, on the subject of the history of Yugoslavia, between 1997 and 2005. He was employed at the Institute of Serbian Culture in Leposavić as director and head of research projects between 2005 and 2008. He was the director in the European High School for Sport journalism in Belgrade in 2008–09.

The Serbian government decided on 23 June 2013 to appoint him the director of the Museum of Genocide Victims.

== Sources ==
- Музеј Жртава Геноцида Београд. "Вељко Ђурић Мишина". Запослени у Музеју жртава геноцида. Музеј Жртава Геноцида Београд. Archived from the original on 2013-11-13.
- Jovanović, Nataša (7 July 2011). "Veljko Đurić Mišina: Otimanje baštine u službi pribavljanja istorije". Печат.
