= Vinalić =

Settlement in Split-Dalmatia County, Croatia

- Settlement
- Interactive map of Vinalić
- Location within Croatia
- Coordinates: 43°55′16″N 16°26′46″E
- Country: Croatia
- County: Split-Dalmatia
- City: Vrlika

Area
  - Total: 18.9 km^{2} (7.3 sq mi)

Population (2021)
  - Total: 137
  - Density: 7.25/km^{2} (18.8/sq mi)
- Time zone: UTC+1 (CET)
  - Summer (DST): UTC+2 (CEST)
- Postal code: 21236 Vrlika
- Area code: +385 (0)21

Vinalić is a settlement in the City of Vrlika in Croatia. In 2021, its population was 137.

== Demographics ==
Vinalić: Population trends 1857–2021
v

population	286	313	246	275	307	395	482	616	554	645	710	612	490	438	283	216	137
	1857	1869	1880	1890	1900	1910	1921	1931	1948	1953	1961	1971	1981	1991	2001	2011	2021

Sources: Croatian Bureau of Statistics publications
