= Dinarić Fortress =

Coordinates: 44°0′N 16°25′E

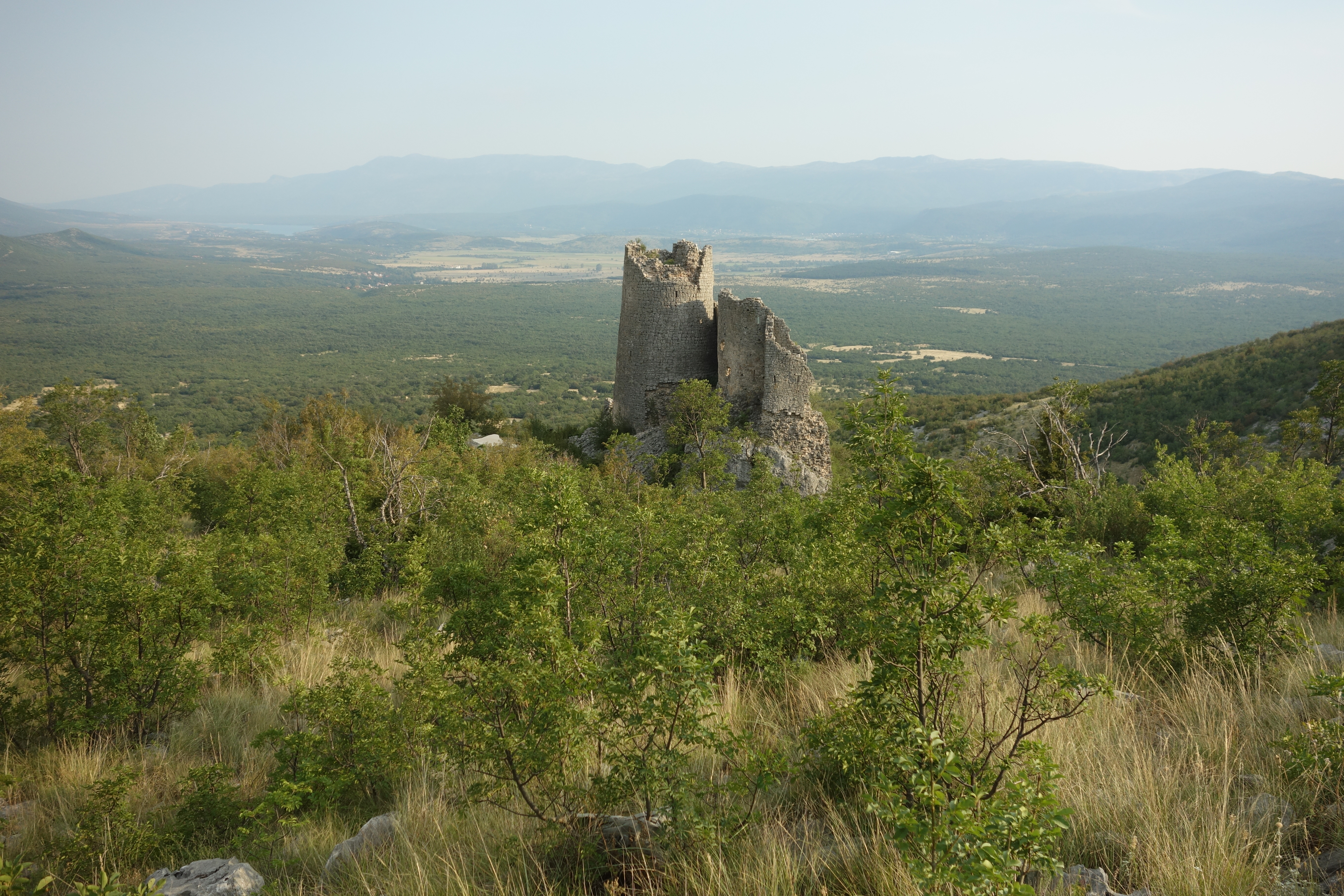
Glavaš Fortress

Location of Glavaš Fortress in Croatia

Glavaš – Dinarić Fortress is a fortress located in the continental part of Dalmatia, Croatia. Dinarić is located below the Dinara mountain, northeast the town of Vrlika, near the village of Kijevo.

Dinarić was built in the 15th century, when Croatia was threatened by Turkish invasions. It was chain link of nearby forts like fort Prozor and Potravnik.

== See also ==
- Vrlika
- Prozor Fortress
