= Cetina, Croatia =

Cetina Цетина (Serbian)
- Village
- Location within Croatia
- Coordinates: 43°58′4″N 16°25′56″E
- Country: Croatia
- County: Šibenik-Knin
- Municipality: Civljane

Area
  - Total: 61.7 km^{2} (23.8 sq mi)

Population (2021)
  - Total: 124
  - Density: 2.01/km^{2} (5.21/sq mi)
- Time zone: UTC+1 (CET)
  - Summer (DST): UTC+2 (CEST)
- Website: www.civljane.hr

Cetina (Serbian Cyrillic: Цетина) is a small village, administratively located in the Civljane Municipality in Šibenik-Knin County, Croatia. According to the 2011 census, the village had 195 inhabitants.

== Geography ==
Located in inland Dalmatia, north from the town of Vrlika, on the route between towns of Knin and Vrlika, Cetina village spreads on 50.98 km^{2}, on the field near the spring of river Cetina, on altitude of approximately 380 m, just under south base of mountain Dinara. Parts of a settlement are hamlets: Dolac nad Lukovačom, Dražica u Lukovači, Jarčište, Lukovača, Nad Glavicom, Nad Lukovačom, Njiva u Lukovači, Podić, Podunište, Sjenokos, Unište, Vaganac and Ždrilo.

== History ==
In the 9th century, probably during the time of Duke Branimir, the old Church of Holy Salvation (Crkva Sv. Spasa) was built in the village. It is one of the oldest and best preserved monuments of the early Croatian sacral architecture.

The Serbian Orthodox Church of the Ascension of the Lord (Hram Vaznesenja Gospodnjeg) was built in 1940 by Marko Četnik and his wife Jelena on the spring of river Cetina. The church was rebuilt in 1974.

== Demographic history ==
- 1857: 606 inhabitants.
- 1921: 981 inhabitants.
- 1961: 1146 inhabitants.
- 1971: 1100 inhabitants.
- 1981: 951 inhabitants.
- 1991: 853 inhabitants; Serbs - 793, Croats - 41, Yugoslavs - 2, Others and Unknown - 17.
- 2001: 123 inhabitants.
- 2011: 195 inhabitants.

== Sources ==
- Jurković, Miljenko (December 1995). "Sv. Spas na vrelu Cetine i problem westwerka u hrvatskoj predromanici" [The Church of the Saviour at the Source of the Cetina River and the Westwork in the Croatian Pre-Romanesque]. Starohrvatska Prosvjeta (in Croatian). III (22). Split: Museum of Croatian Archaeological Monuments: 63–64, 75. ISSN 0351-4536.
