= Laktac =

Coordinates: 43°51′N 16°32′E

- Village
- Interactive map of Laktac
- Country: Croatia
- County: Split-Dalmatia County
- Municipality: Hrvace

Area
  - Total: 3.7 sq mi (9.6 km^{2})

Population (2021)
  - Total: 5
  - Density: 1.3/sq mi (0.52/km^{2})
- Time zone: UTC+1 (CET)
  - Summer (DST): UTC+2 (CEST)

Laktac (Serbian Cyrillic: Лактац) is a settlement in the Hrvace municipality in Croatia.

== Geography ==
Laktac is situated 13 km southeast from Vrlika and 20 km northwest from Sinj, at the foot of the Dinara Mountain Range, on the Cetina river (Peruća Lake). It is located in the wider Dalmatian hinterland.

== History ==
In 1857, while part of the Kingdom of Dalmatia, it had 164 inhabitants. It was inhabited by Orthodox Serbs. It was formerly part of the Sinj municipality. During the Croatian War, it was part of Republika Srpska Krajina.

== Demographics ==
According to the 2011 census, the village had 2 inhabitants. It was uninhabited during the 2002 census. According to the 1991 census the village had 124 inhabitants, with a majority of ethnic Serbs (80.64%), while the rest did not register ethnicity.

Serb returnees have been threatened by a family from neighbouring village Bitelić, who maintain their cattle in Laktac since Operation Oluja.

== Culture and anthropology ==
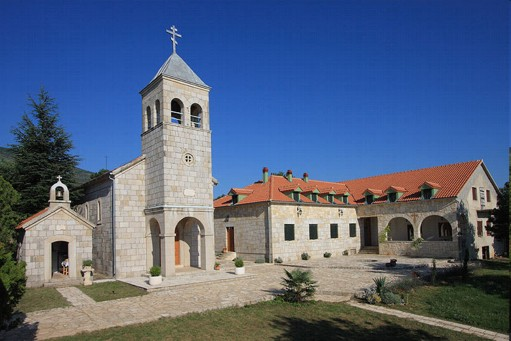
Dragović monastery.

Nearest to the village, towards Koljane, is the Serbian Orthodox Dragović monastery. Some stećci are located on the field between Laktac and Dragović.

The historical families of Laktac were all Orthodox Christian, including Bogovac, Bodrožić, Borković, Vinčić, Nikolić, Katić, Kovačić, Miljković, Peović.

== See also ==
- Dabar, Hrvace
