= Church of the Ascension of the Lord, Cetina =

Serbian Orthodox church in Cetina, Croatia

Church of the Ascension of the Lord
- Храм Вазнесења Господњег; Hram Vaznesenja Gospodnjeg
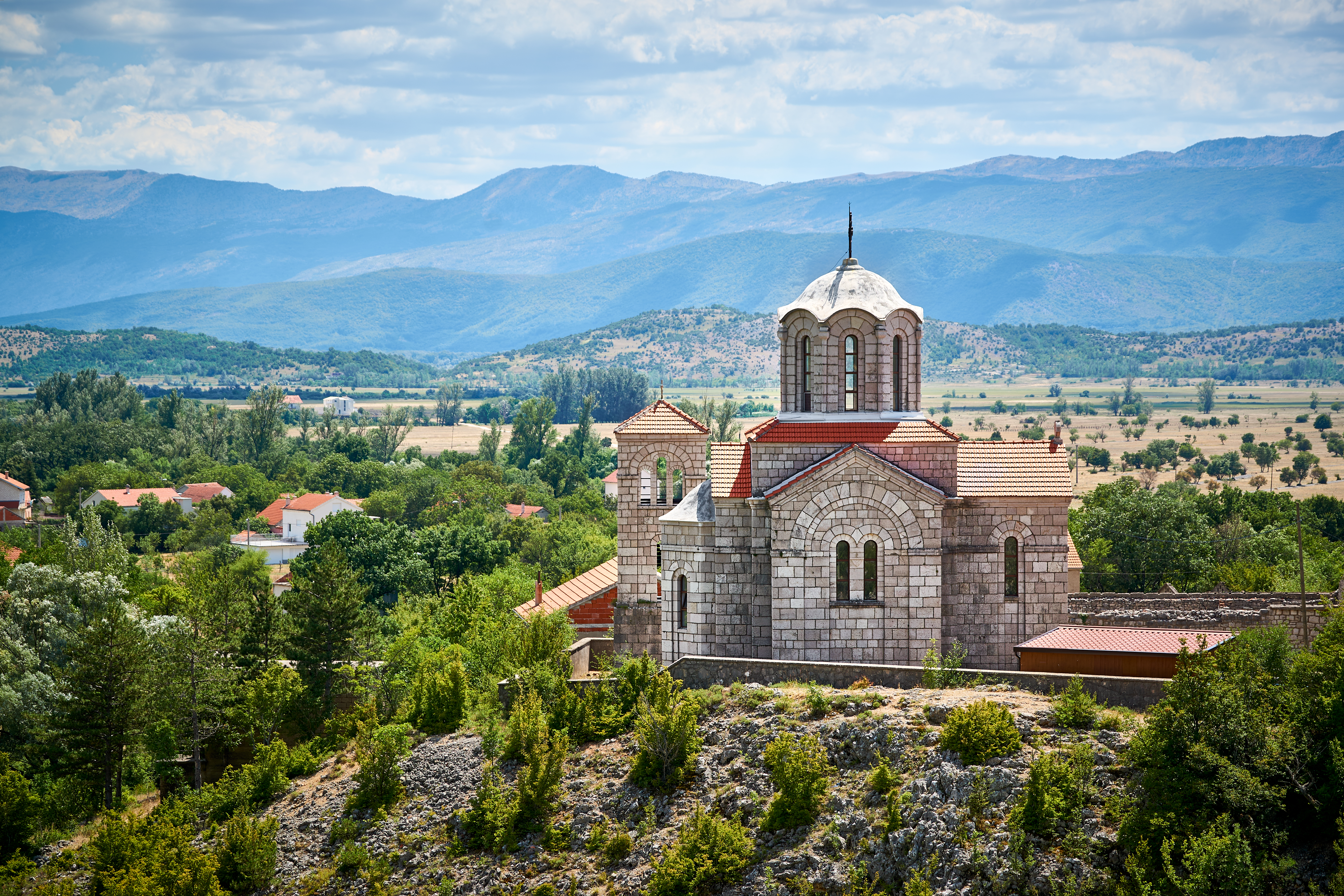
- View at the church and the source of the Cetina river

- Location within Croatia
- Church of the Ascension of the Lord
- 43°58′34.8″N 16°25′46.8″E
- Location: Cetina
- Country: Croatia
- Denomination: Serbian Orthodox

Administration
- Archdiocese: Eparchy of Dalmatia

Church of the Ascension of the Lord (Serbian: Храм Вазнесења Господњег) is a Serbian Orthodox church in the small village of Cetina in Šibenik-Knin County, Croatia.

Built in 1940 by Marko and Jelena Četnik, the church was destroyed during the Second World War and rebuilt in 1974 when new bells were purchased and a stone fence was erected around the church gate. During the Croatian War of Independence, the church and its inventory was burned down and destroyed by Croatian Armed Forces.

This church was built modeled on the Temple St. Joachim and Anne at the Studenica Monastery.

== See also ==
- Church of Holy Salvation, Cetina
- Serbs of Croatia
- List of Serbian Orthodox churches in Croatia
