= Potravlje Fortress =

Potravlje Fortress (also known as Potravnik or Travnik) is a medieval fortress near a village of Potravlje, on Svilaja mountain, 15 kilometres (9 mi) northwest of Sinj, Croatia.

The fortress was probably constructed by Nelipčić dukes, and was first mentioned in 1372. The Turks captured it in 1522, but were pushed out by the Venetians in the late 17th century.

== Location ==
On the eastern slopes of the Svilaja, on one of the hills above Potravlje near Sinj, is the medieval fortress of Travnik (Gradina, Vindušića gradina, Kotromanića kula, Bićin-grad). The hill itself on which the medieval fortress was built is an easily defensible position protected by deep and steep ravines that descend from the Svilaja. Given its strategic location, a hillfort was built there during prehistoric times, traces of which - the remains of a dry-stone rampart or embankment - can be seen on the eastern slope of the hill.

== History ==
A settlement existed at the foot of the fortress in early antiquity (2nd-3rd century), as evidenced by the finds of Roman graves, fibulae and stelae (Roman tombstones) of the Naevius family. On the very hill where the medieval fortress stands, traces of a late antique fortification and settlement with a large church and cemetery at the foot were also found at the Grudine site. The medieval fortress was first mentioned in 1372 as part of the estate of the noble Nelipić family. It is also very often found in sources during the first decades of the 15th century, also in the possession of the same family. In 1505, the fortress was managed by the castellans Stjepan Martinošević and Duke Kožul. The Turks probably conquered it around 1520. According to tradition, they fired cannons at it from the nearby Gradić hill. It is not mentioned in later sources, so it was probably abandoned.

== Specifications ==
The fortress has a triangular ground plan with very well-preserved ramparts and a prominent semicircular tower on the southeast corner, which is partly based on the ramparts and tower of the earlier fortification. There was also an entrance with stairs on the south side. Several poorly preserved walls testify to the existence of buildings within the fortress. The fortress yielded about 30 iron arrowheads for crossbows and bows from the late 14th and early 15th centuries, a three-pronged earring, and Hungarian coins and coins of Hrvoje Vukčić Hrvatinić. The arrows are associated with numerous deliveries of weapons, military equipment, and warriors sent by coastal towns to the princes of the Nelipić house during the 14th and early 15th centuries. The medieval settlement was located at the foot of Travnik.

== Sources ==
- "Castles of Split Dalmatia County". inyourpocket.com. In Your Pocket City Guides. Archived from the original on 2011-06-10.
