= Milica Bodrožić =

Milica Bodrožić (Serbian Cyrillic: Милица Бодрожић) is a Serbian writer and academic specialized on the political history of Yugoslavia. She was a member of the Museum of the Yugoslav People's Revolution in Belgrade.

== Work ==
- Stranke šestojanuarske diktature 1931–1941. godine: doktorska disertacija, 1987
- Jugoslovenska nacionalna stranka pod vladom Bogoljuba Jevtića i Petomajski izbori 1935. godine, Matica srpska, 1991
- O ustašama i četnicima u dubrovačkom kraju 1941–1944. godine
- O nekim pitanjima politike Hrvatske seljačke stranke prema narodnooslobodilačkom pokretu u Hrvatskoj 1943. godine
- Inteligencija Kosova i Metohije u oslobodilačkom ratu i socijalističkoj revoluciji 1941–1944. godine
