= Zasiok =

Settlement in Split-Dalmatia County, Croatia

- Settlement
- Interactive map of Zasiok
- Location within Croatia
- Coordinates: 43°49′13″N 16°33′48″E
- Country: Croatia
- County: Split-Dalmatia
- Municipality: Hrvace

Area
  - Total: 5.6 km^{2} (2.2 sq mi)

Population (2021)
  - Total: 24
  - Density: 4.3/km^{2} (11/sq mi)
- Time zone: UTC+1 (CET)
  - Summer (DST): UTC+2 (CEST)
- Postal code: 21233 Hrvace
- Area code: +385 (0)21

Zasiok is a settlement in the Municipality of Hrvace in Croatia. In 2021, its population was 24.

== Demographics ==
Zasiok: Population trends 1857–2021
v

population	189		269	276	313	446		412	289	307	176	146	110	76	44	38	24
	1857	1869	1880	1890	1900	1910	1921	1931	1948	1953	1961	1971	1981	1991	2001	2011	2021

Sources: Croatian Bureau of Statistics publications
