= Koljane =

- Interactive map of Koljane
- Location within Croatia
- Coordinates: 43°53′N 16°31′E
- Country: Croatia
- County: Split-Dalmatia
- City: Vrlika

Area
  - Total: 71.2 km^{2} (27.5 sq mi)

Population (2021)
  - Total: 21
  - Density: 0.29/km^{2} (0.76/sq mi)
- Time zone: UTC+1 (CET)
  - Summer (DST): UTC+2 (CEST)

Koljane is a small village in Split-Dalmatia County, Croatia. Koljane is a settlement in the Vrlika municipality, and the majority of the population are Croats. In the 1991 census, the population of Koljane was 285, and the majority were Serbs with 90% (257).

Koljane is located in inland Dalmatia, on the coast of Peruća Lake, 15 km east of Vrlika.

Serbian Orthodox Dragović Monastery is situated in Koljane.

On the location of Crkvine, the remains of an early church from the 9th century have been found; the plate of the altar partition, adorned with "pleter" (interlacery ornaments), is one of the best preserved and most beautiful monuments of the early Middle Ages in Croatia. Around the church are numerous graves; their finds include earrings from the 9th to 12th centuries, as well as swords and spurs of the Carolingian type (9th century).

== Notable people ==
- Jovan Krkobabić
- Boško Marinko

== See also ==
- Vrlika
