= Garjak =

Settlement in Split-Dalmatia County, Croatia

- Settlement
- Interactive map of Garjak
- Location within Croatia
- Coordinates: 43°54′04″N 16°27′36″E
- Country: Croatia
- County: Split-Dalmatia
- City: Vrlika

Area
  - Total: 27.8 km^{2} (10.7 sq mi)

Population (2021)
  - Total: 54
  - Density: 1.9/km^{2} (5.0/sq mi)
- Time zone: UTC+1 (CET)
  - Summer (DST): UTC+2 (CEST)
- Postal code: 21236 Vrlika
- Area code: +385 (0)21

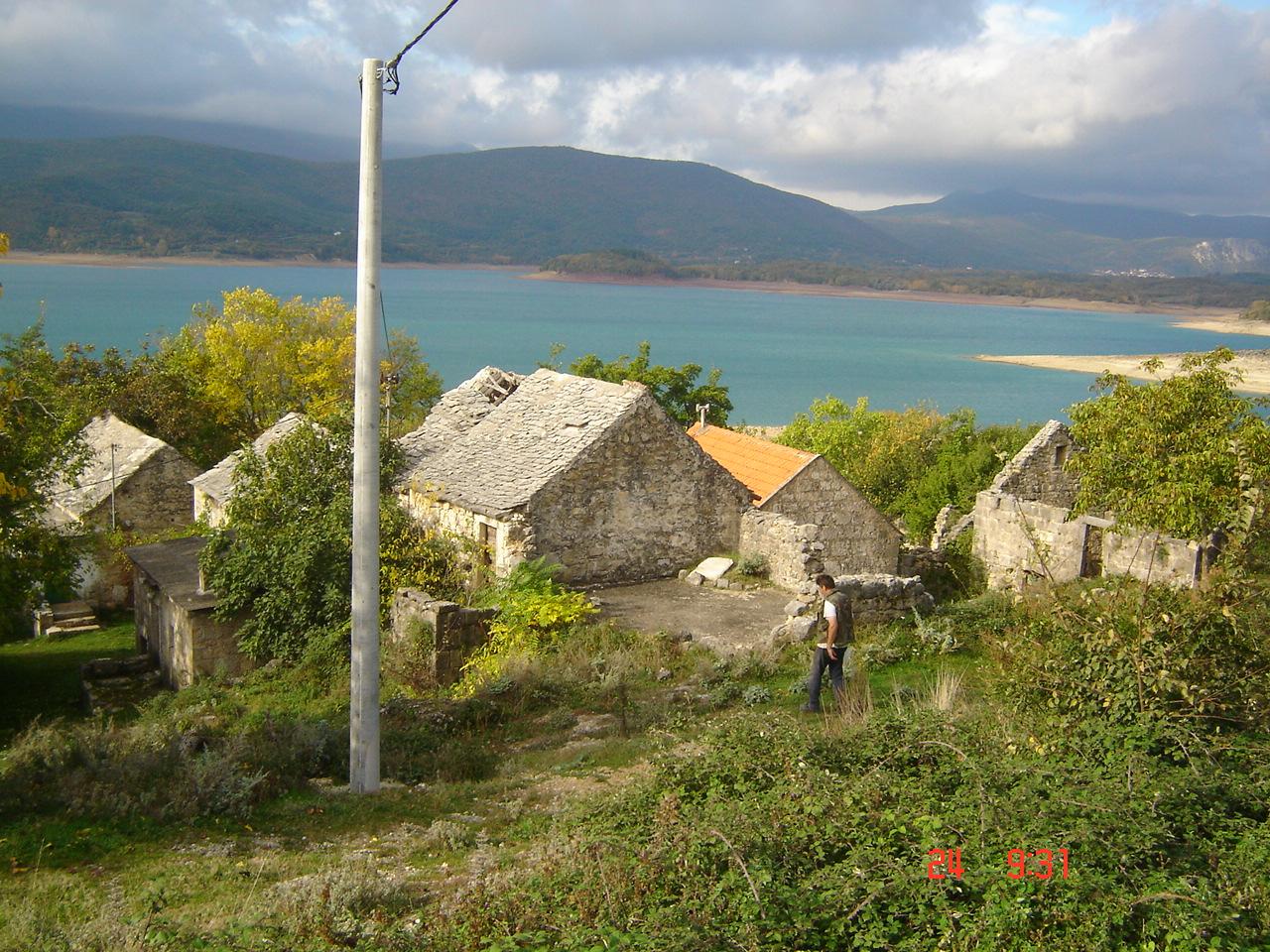
Panorama of Garjak

Garjak is a settlement in the City of Vrlika in Croatia. In 2021, its population was 54.

== Demographics ==
Garjak: Population trends 1857–2021
v

population	601	571	541	614	726	854	875	967	790	819	323	247	192	141	87	88	54
	1857	1869	1880	1890	1900	1910	1921	1931	1948	1953	1961	1971	1981	1991	2001	2011	2021

Sources: Croatian Bureau of Statistics publications
