= Rumin, Croatia =

Settlement in Split-Dalmatia County, Croatia

Rumin
- Settlement
- Interactive map of Rumin
- Location within Croatia
- Coordinates: 43°46′30″N 16°38′28″E
- Country: Croatia
- County: Split-Dalmatia
- Municipality: Hrvace

Area
  - Total: 16.3 km^{2} (6.3 sq mi)

Population (2021)
  - Total: 171
  - Density: 10.5/km^{2} (27.2/sq mi)
- Time zone: UTC+1 (CET)
  - Summer (DST): UTC+2 (CEST)
- Postal code: 21233 Hrvace
- Area code: +385 (0)21

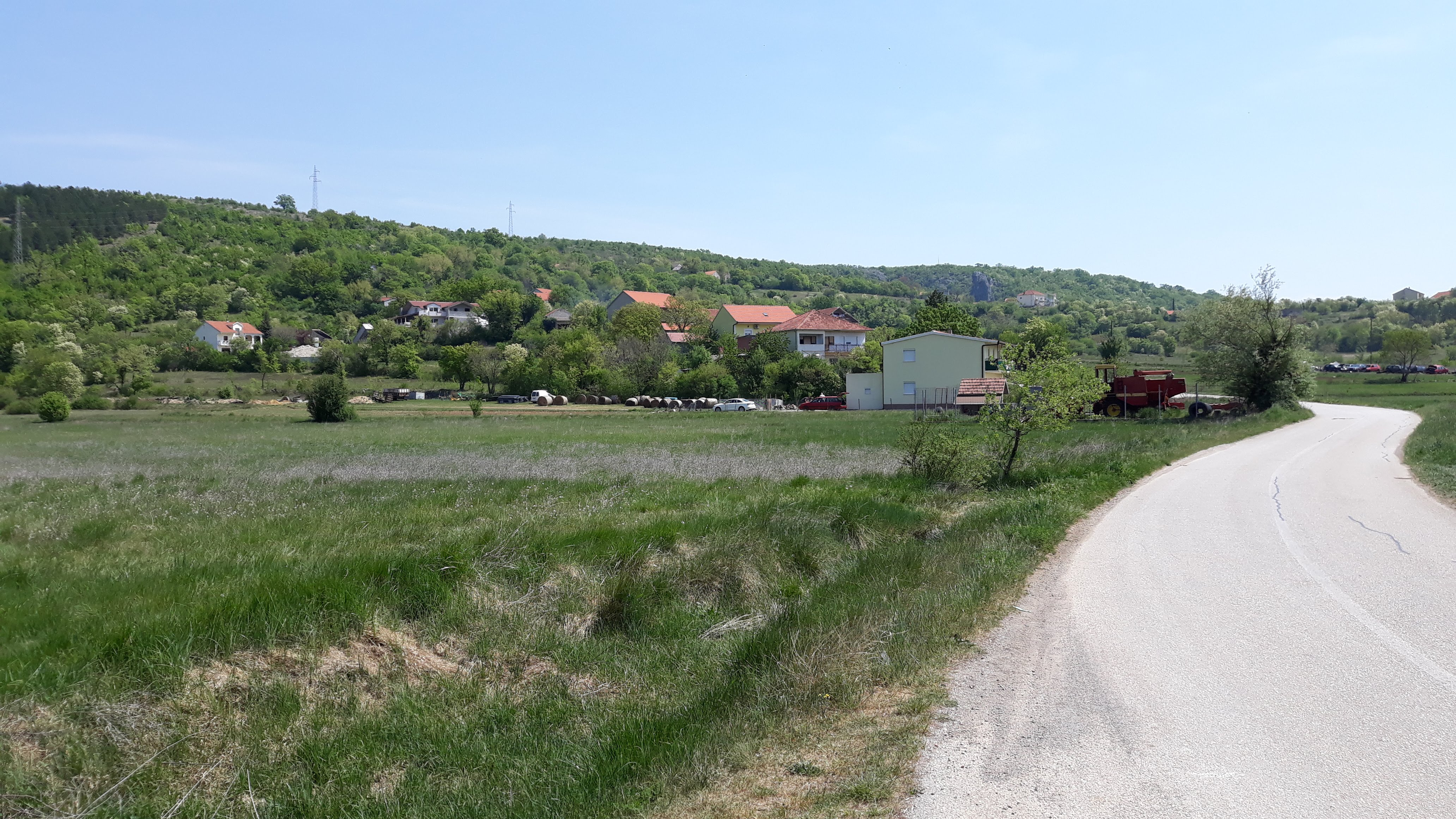
A path in Rumin village, municipaliy of Hrvace, Croatia.

Rumin is a settlement in the Municipality of Hrvace in Croatia. In 2021, its population was 171.

== Demographics ==
Rumin: Population trends 1857–2021
v

population				34		31		45	112	480	440	334	285	226	220	190	171
	1857	1869	1880	1890	1900	1910	1921	1931	1948	1953	1961	1971	1981	1991	2001	2011	2021

Sources: Croatian Bureau of Statistics publications
