= Ježević =

Settlement in Split-Dalmatia County, Croatia

- Settlement
- Interactive map of Ježević
- Location within Croatia
- Coordinates: 43°55′26″N 16°27′54″E
- Country: Croatia
- County: Split-Dalmatia
- City: Vrlika

Area
  - Total: 23.8 km^{2} (9.2 sq mi)

Population (2021)
  - Total: 167
  - Density: 7.02/km^{2} (18.2/sq mi)
- Time zone: UTC+1 (CET)
  - Summer (DST): UTC+2 (CEST)
- Postal code: 21236 Vrlika
- Area code: +385 (0)21

Ježević is a settlement in the City of Vrlika in Croatia. In 2021, its population was 167.

== Demographics ==
Ježević: Population trends 1857–2021
v

| population | 462 | 486 | 521 | 619 | 719 | 770 | 826 | 884 | 707 | 737 | 702 | 664 | 644 | 585 | 349 | 236 | 167 |
| | 1857 | 1869 | 1880 | 1890 | 1900 | 1910 | 1921 | 1931 | 1948 | 1953 | 1961 | 1971 | 1981 | 1991 | 2001 | 2011 | 2021 |

Sources: Croatian Bureau of Statistics publications
