= Satrić =

Settlement in Split-Dalmatia County, Croatia

- Settlement
- Interactive map of Satrić
- Location within Croatia
- Coordinates: 43°46′44″N 16°34′12″E
- Country: Croatia
- County: Split-Dalmatia
- Municipality: Hrvace

Area
  - Total: 13.4 km^{2} (5.2 sq mi)

Population (2021)
  - Total: 413
  - Density: 30.8/km^{2} (79.8/sq mi)
- Time zone: UTC+1 (CET)
  - Summer (DST): UTC+2 (CEST)
- Postal code: 21233 Hrvace
- Area code: +385 (0)21

Satrić is a settlement in the Municipality of Hrvace in Croatia. In 2021, its population was 413.

== Demographics ==
Satrić: Population trends 1857–2021
v

population	411	787	631	507	537	594	462	667	840	841	696	771	569	622	513	456	413
	1857	1869	1880	1890	1900	1910	1921	1931	1948	1953	1961	1971	1981	1991	2001	2011	2021

Sources: Croatian Bureau of Statistics publications
