= Vučipolje, Split-Dalmatia County =

Settlement in Split-Dalmatia County, Croatia

Vučipolje
- Settlement
- Interactive map of Vučipolje
- Location within Croatia
- Coordinates: 43°49′52″N 16°34′55″E
- Country: Croatia
- County: Split-Dalmatia
- Municipality: Hrvace

Area
  - Total: 22.4 km^{2} (8.6 sq mi)

Population (2021)
  - Total: 69
  - Density: 3.1/km^{2} (8.0/sq mi)
- Time zone: UTC+1 (CET)
  - Summer (DST): UTC+2 (CEST)
- Postal code: 21233 Hrvace
- Area code: +385 (0)21

Vučipolje is a settlement in the Municipality of Hrvace in Croatia. In 2021, its population was 69.

== Demographics ==
Vučipolje: Population trends 1857–2021
v

population	248	536	301	361	358	294	664	253	390	415	361	293	207	174	113	107	69
	1857	1869	1880	1890	1900	1910	1921	1931	1948	1953	1961	1971	1981	1991	2001	2011	2021

Sources: Croatian Bureau of Statistics publications
