= Potravlje =

Settlement in Split-Dalmatia County, Croatia

- Settlement
- Interactive map of Potravlje
- Location within Croatia
- Coordinates: 43°47′53″N 16°32′53″E
- Country: Croatia
- County: Split-Dalmatia
- Municipality: Hrvace

Area
  - Total: 36.4 km^{2} (14.1 sq mi)

Population (2021)
  - Total: 527
  - Density: 14.5/km^{2} (37.5/sq mi)
- Time zone: UTC+1 (CET)
  - Summer (DST): UTC+2 (CEST)
- Postal code: 21233 Hrvace
- Area code: +385 (0)21

Potravlje is a settlement in the Municipality of Hrvace in Croatia. In 2021, its population was 527.

== Demographics ==
Potravlje: Population trends 1857–2021
v

population	919	1186	709	1062	1203	1281	1313	1352	1292	1386	1245	1230	1174	1006	823	651	527
	1857	1869	1880	1890	1900	1910	1921	1931	1948	1953	1961	1971	1981	1991	2001	2011	2021

Sources: Croatian Bureau of Statistics publications
