= Dabar, Split-Dalmatia County =

Settlement in Split-Dalmatia County, Croatia

Dabar
- Settlement
- Interactive map of Dabar
- Location within Croatia
- Coordinates: 43°49′52″N 16°33′18″E
- Country: Croatia
- County: Split-Dalmatia
- Municipality: Hrvace

Area
  - Total: 11.5 km^{2} (4.4 sq mi)

Population (2021)
  - Total: 14
  - Density: 1.2/km^{2} (3.2/sq mi)
- Time zone: UTC+1 (CET)
  - Summer (DST): UTC+2 (CEST)
- Postal code: 21233 Hrvace
- Area code: +385 (0)21

Dabar is a settlement in the Municipality of Hrvace in Croatia. In 2021, its population was 14.

== Demographics ==
Dabar: Population trends 1857–2021
v

population	244	447	467	274	339	333	656	370	342	338	242	202	175	121	26	22	14
	1857	1869	1880	1890	1900	1910	1921	1931	1948	1953	1961	1971	1981	1991	2001	2011	2021

Sources: Croatian Bureau of Statistics publications
