= Church of Holy Salvation, Cetina =

Church of Holy Salvation
- Crkva Svetog Spasa
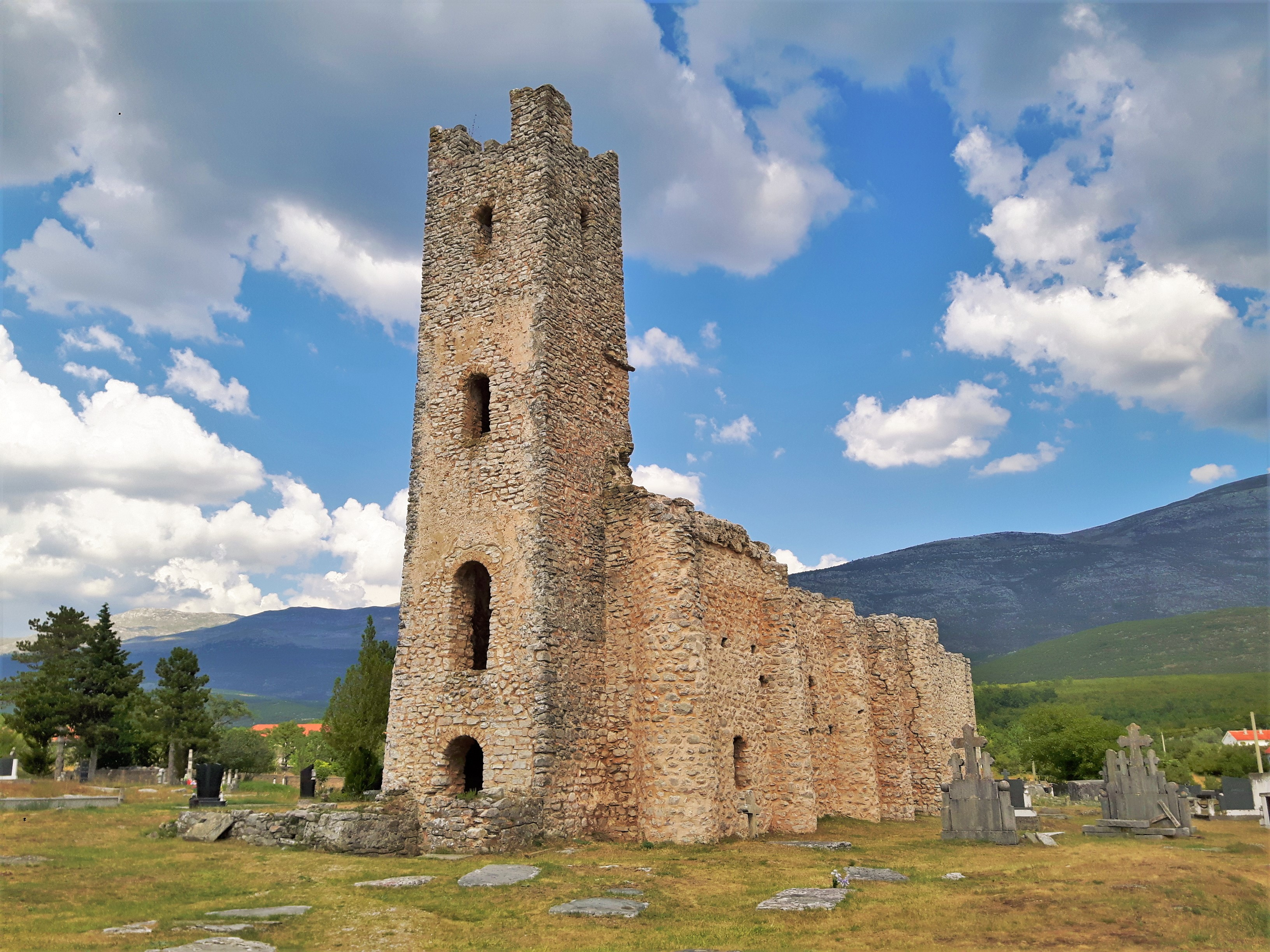
- Church of Holy Salvation

- Location within Croatia
- 43°58′23.6″N 16°25′37.8″E
- Location: Cetina, Croatia
- Country: Croatia
- Denomination: Catholic Church

Architecture
- Years built: 9th century

Cultural Good of Croatia
- Type: Protected cultural good
- Reference no.: Z-4303

The Church of the Holy Salvation or Holy Saviour (Croatian: Crkva Sv. Spasa) was a Pre-Romanesque Catholic church in the Dalmatian Hinterland, Croatia, whose ruins are now a historic site. It is located in the small village of Cetina, near the spring of the river Cetina, 8 km northwest from the town of Vrlika.

The remains of the church are of historical significance in Croatia, as it is the only pre-schism church constructed with a bell tower (with a westwork) which is still standing.

== Description ==
The church was once a one-longitudinal-nave structure with a sanctuary consisting of three apses, in the form of a trefoil on the eastern end. During later reconstruction, the middle apse was pulled down and substituted by a larger, rectangular one. An imposing bell-tower was positioned in front of entrance along with the two-story westwork in front of the church's nave. Westwork is a notable feature of Carolingian architecture, which was at its peak in Europe during the 9th century.

The church is vaulted with five pairs of strong semi-circular buttresses and by the tufa which was found in the ground during an excavations. While the first pair of the buttresses lean diagonally against the edges of the westwork, the second pair reinforces the portion of the wall that separates the westwork from the nave, then the next two pairs support the walls of the nave, and the last pair support the side apses. The vaults support a gallery on the western side near the entrance, accessible by a staircase from the north and entering to a platform on the second story. The gallery, believed to be reserved for the Count when he participated in the services, looked down upon the nave through three round openings, the central one being higher than the others.

== History ==
=== Medieval times ===
The church was built near Vrlika, called Vrh Rike in the 9th to 10th century. It was dated to the time of Duke Branimir of Dalmatian Croatia through comparative analysis of an altar beam with other artefacts carrying Branimir's name by Ivo Petricioli in 1980 and 1984. It is one of the oldest and best preserved larger monuments of the early pre-Romanesque sacral architecture.

It was commissioned as a private church by the local župan (district-prefect) Gastika of Cetina, at the recommendation of Pope Stephen VI, in memory of his family. This is confirmed by inscriptions from a beam taken from the altar, which notes in Latin: AD ONOREM D(omi)N(u)M N(ostri) IESU CHR(ist)I EGO GASTICA HUPPANUS D(onavi) [...] I ET ANIMATE MEE ET MATR(i)S MEE NOMINE NEMIRA ET F(i)LIIS MEIS NOMINE. It translates that the church had been dedicated to Christ and built on the order of the prefect Gastika, the son of Nemira. The beams are held along with other artifacts found at the site at the Archaeological Museum in Split.

=== Destruction ===
In the early 15th century, Hrvoje Vukčić strengthened the Prozor Fortress, and most of the inhabitants moved out of Vrh Rika into Vrlika. After a 1492 invasion by the Ottoman Empire, the church and the settlement sustained heavy damage and a substantial part of the inhabitants fled to Turopolje. The church subsequently fell to ruin. The ruins of the church and surrounding tombs were described by the Archbishop of Split Stjepan Cupilli during his tour of his archdiocese lands in 1708, as well as Alberto Fortis during his travels in 1774, and Ivan Lovrić in 1776.

Despite its damaged state, the church ruins were still viewed as a sacred site by the local population. Franciscan archaeologist Stjepan Zlatović described the pilgrimage local Catholics continued to make every year on Ascension Day, where the Vrlika parish priest would hold a special mass within the church ruins.

In the late 19th century, Franciscan friar Lujo Marun of the Knin parish became the first person to conduct an excavation of the site, the findings which he published in 1895 and 1896. Marun took the first known photograph of the church in 1894, which turned out to be immensely valuable for future researchers, as the photograph depicts parts of the church wall which no longer exist. Despite his efforts, Marun was unable to complete his work and could not therefore offer conclusive evidence on the church's formation.

=== Modern ===
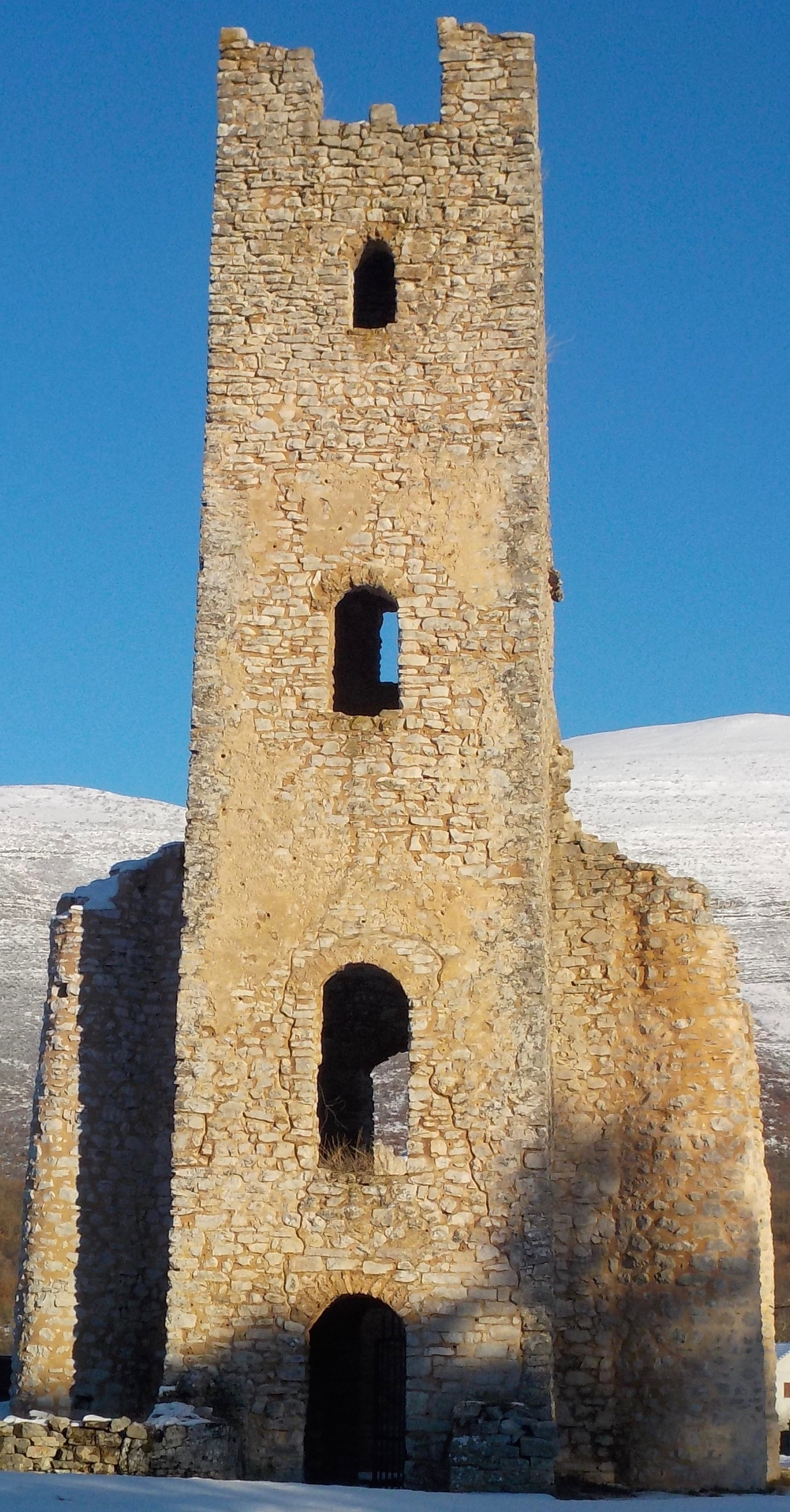
Bell tower

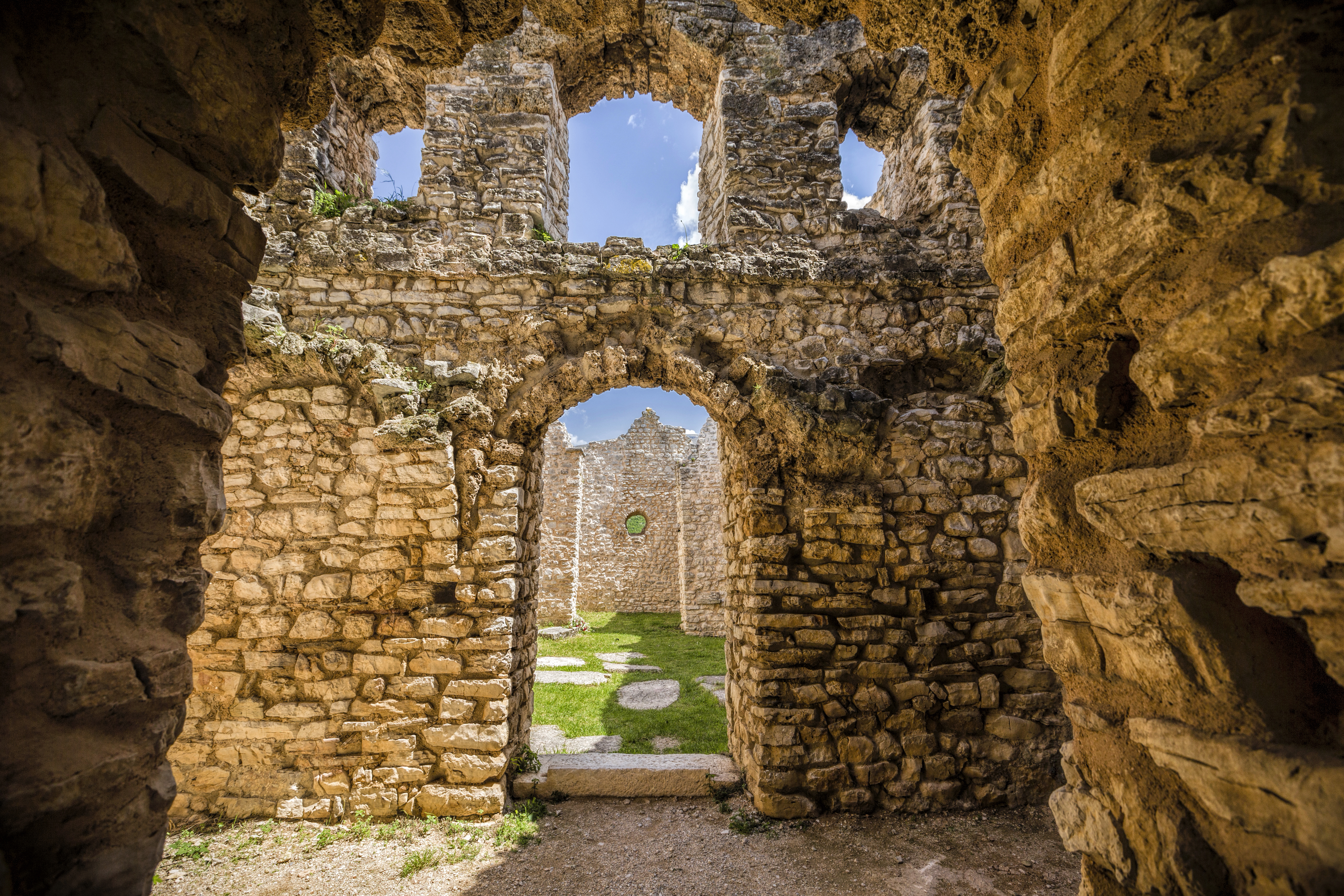
Inside the church

It wasn't until 1947 that a more scientific, archaeological excavation of the site was conducted by the Museum of Croatian Archaeological Monuments. Led by renowned archaeologist Stjepan Gunjača, the team's work focused on excavating inside the church along with the surrounding area and preserving what was left of the existing structures. It was Gunjača and his team who discovered the altar beam confirming district prefect Gastika as the donor for the church. The team unearthed hundreds of old-Croatian graves, many containing jewellery, coins, belts, weaponry, and other artefacts now kept at the archaeology museum in Split. With these findings, the Croatian archaeological group was able to put the age of the church at the late 9th century.

The confusion about its historicity arose in the early 20th century, when Nikodim Milaš the Serbian Orthodox bishop of the Eparchy of Dalmatia, published Pravoslavna Dalmacija (1901) in which based on alleged Simeon Končarević's chronicle, claimed that was built as Eastern Orthodox church during the rule of Bosnian king Tvrtko I and destroyed by the Turks in 1512. Serbian Orthodox church of the Eparchy of Dalmatia still claims the same, while archaeologists from the Serbian Archaeological Society in 1989 rejected Serbian nationalist claims and stated the dispute should be about its exact dating between 9-11th century. The baseless Milaš's claim is easily refuted by the archaeological and historical evidence, which conclusively dates the foundation of the church and surrounding graves to the 10th century at the latest.

The historical and spiritual ownership of the remains of the church has long been a source of tension between the local Croatian Catholic and Serb Orthodox populations, with both sides claiming ownership. After the archaeological excavations were completed in 1954, the Serbian Orthodox population began a campaign of burying their dead haphazardly throughout the grounds in order to lay claim to the church. In 1983, monks from the Serbian Orthodox Church erected iron-barred gates at the entrance of the church and walled off the windows to prevent Catholics from utilising the church. At the same time an ancient wall fragment depicting the Croatian interlace was also destroyed. It was not until after the end of the war that Catholics were able to return to the church and continue their yearly pilgrimage to celebrate the Ascension.

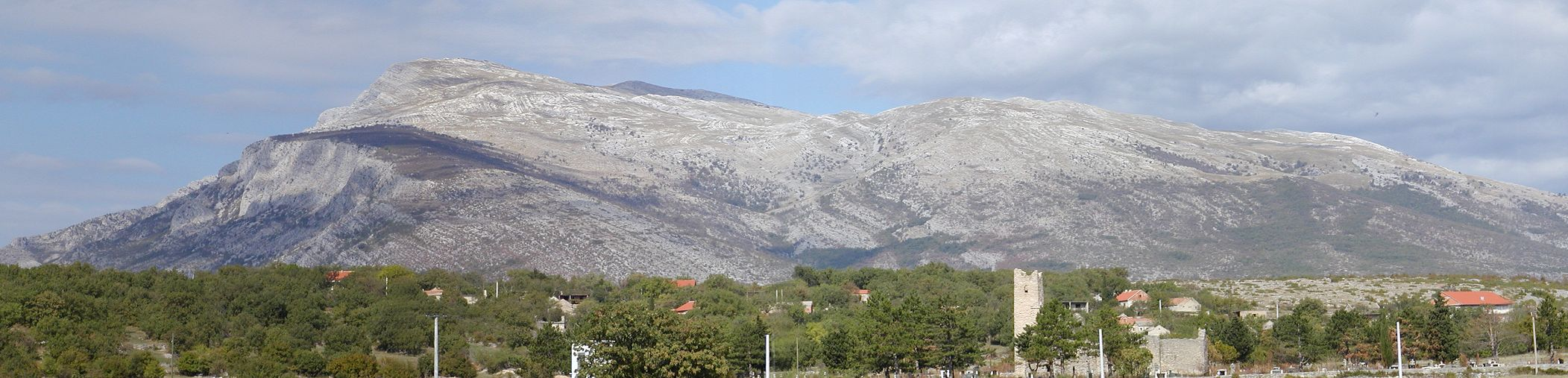
Church of Holy Salvation in front of Dinara mountain

== Graves ==
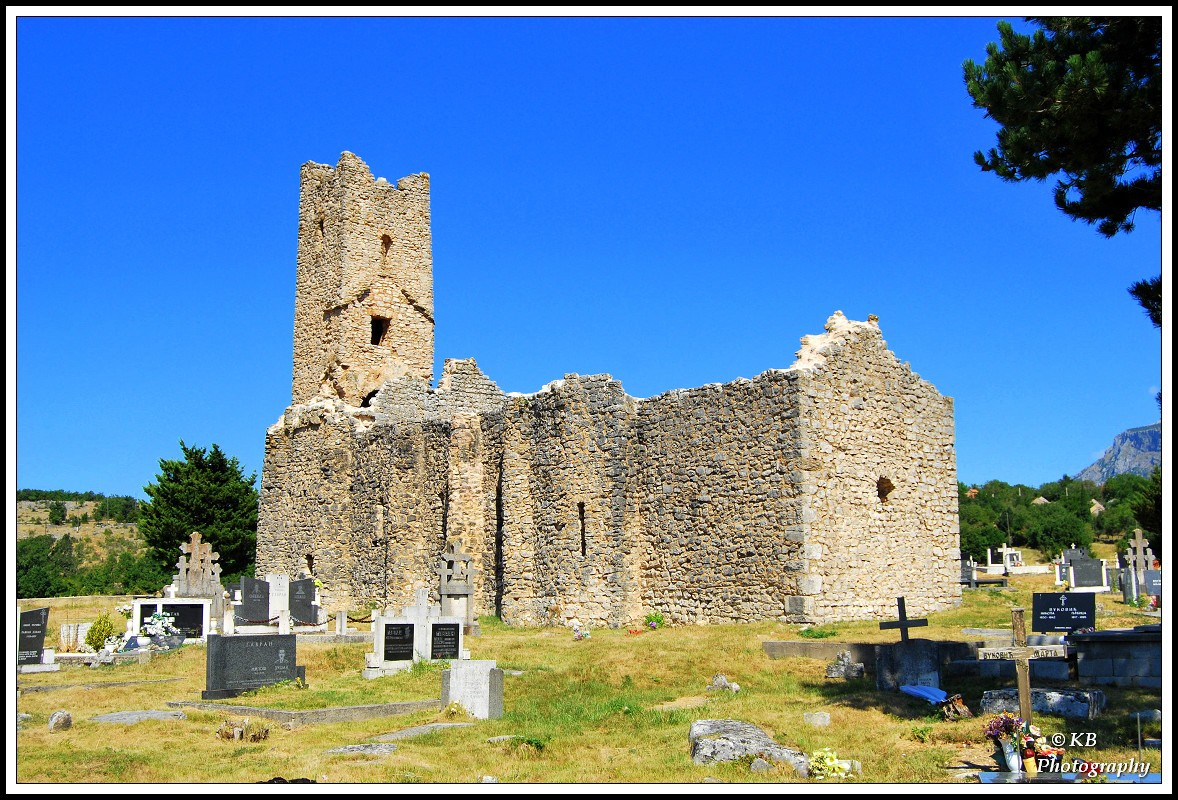
Church of Holy Salvation and its cemetery

The graves found near the Church, dated from the 9th through 14th century, had a specific kind of textile that was found to be comparable in quality with 18th and 19th century clothing. There are over 1,026 old Croatian graves around the church of great archaeological interest. Several tombs have been found in the church itself, most of which (more than 800) originally had stećci, a specific type of medieval tombstone found throughout the western Balkans. The culture of that time was influenced by the Frankish Empire, which was noticed in the archaeological findings from the period and the structure of the church.

The excavations by Gunjača and his team unearthed over 1,000 graves over a 11,250m2 area, the majority estimated to have been buried between the 11th and 16th centuries along with some outliers. Several artifacts found in the graves include earrings, rings, buttons, fabric, tiles, and various coins.

== See also ==
- Architecture of Croatia

== General sources ==
- Jurković, Miljenko (December 1995). "Sv. Spas na vrelu Cetine i problem westwerka u hrvatskoj predromanici" [The Church of the Saviour at the Source of the Cetina River and the Westwork in the Croatian Pre-Romanesque]. Starohrvatska Prosvjeta (in Croatian). III (22). Split: Museum of Croatian Archaeological Monuments: 55–80. ISSN 0351-4536.
- Marasović, Tomislav (December 1995). "Crkva Sv. Spasa na vrelu Cetine: Prilog tipološkoj analizi" [The Church of st Saviour at the Source of the Cetina River]. Starohrvatska Prosvjeta (in Croatian). III (22). Split: Museum of Croatian Archaeological Monuments: 37–54. ISSN 0351-4536.
- Petricioli, Ivo (December 1995). "Crkva Sv. Spasa na vrelu Cetine" [The Church of the Holy Saviour at the Source of the Cetina River]. Starohrvatska Prosvjeta (in Croatian). III (22). Split: Museum of Croatian Archaeological Monuments: 19–28. ISSN 0351-4536.
