= Podosoje, Vrlika =

Coordinates: 43°54′N 16°26′E

Podosje
- Village
- Interactive map of Podosje
- Country: Croatia

Area
  - Total: 4.0 sq mi (10.4 km^{2})

Population (2021)
  - Total: 208
  - Density: 51.8/sq mi (20.0/km^{2})
- Time zone: UTC+1 (CET)
  - Summer (DST): UTC+2 (CEST)

Podosje is a village in Croatia. It is connected by the D1 highway.
