= Gornji Bitelić =

Settlement in Split-Dalmatia County, Croatia

- Settlement
- Interactive map of Gornji Bitelić
- Location within Croatia
- Coordinates: 43°48′07″N 16°38′20″E
- Country: Croatia
- County: Split-Dalmatia
- Municipality: Hrvace

Area
  - Total: 33.4 km^{2} (12.9 sq mi)

Population (2021)
  - Total: 140
  - Density: 4.2/km^{2} (11/sq mi)
- Time zone: UTC+1 (CET)
  - Summer (DST): UTC+2 (CEST)
- Postal code: 21233 Hrvace
- Area code: +385 (0)21

Gornji Bitelić is a settlement in the Municipality of Hrvace in Croatia. In 2021, its population was 140.

== Demographics ==
Gornji Bitelić: Population trends 1857–2021
v

population	755	856	957	1017	1224	1260	1158	1317	1208	606	621	534	553	323	234	192	140
	1857	1869	1880	1890	1900	1910	1921	1931	1948	1953	1961	1971	1981	1991	2001	2011	2021

Sources: Croatian Bureau of Statistics publications
