= Maljkovo =

Coordinates: 43°49′N 16°31′E

- Village
- Interactive map of Maljkovo
- Country: Croatia
- County: Split-Dalmatia County
- Municipality: Hrvace

Area
  - Total: 2.9 sq mi (7.4 km^{2})

Population (2021)
  - Total: 61
  - Density: 21/sq mi (8.2/km^{2})
- Time zone: UTC+1 (CET)
  - Summer (DST): UTC+2 (CEST)

Maljkovo is a settlement in the Hrvace municipality in Croatia . It is connected by the D1 highway.
