= Donji Bitelić =

Settlement in Split-Dalmatia County, Croatia

- Settlement
- Interactive map of Donji Bitelić
- Location within Croatia
- Coordinates: 43°49′06″N 16°37′01″E
- Country: Croatia
- County: Split-Dalmatia
- Municipality: Hrvace

Area
  - Total: 31.8 km^{2} (12.3 sq mi)

Population (2021)
  - Total: 237
  - Density: 7.45/km^{2} (19.3/sq mi)
- Time zone: UTC+1 (CET)
  - Summer (DST): UTC+2 (CEST)
- Postal code: 21233 Hrvace
- Area code: +385 (0)21

Donji Bitelić is a settlement in the Municipality of Hrvace in Croatia. In 2021, its population was 237.

== Demographics ==
Donji Bitelić: Population trends 1857–2021
v

population	639	641	671	717	784	733	651	720	665	1055	999	924	694	615	424	317	237
	1857	1869	1880	1890	1900	1910	1921	1931	1948	1953	1961	1971	1981	1991	2001	2011	2021

Sources: Croatian Bureau of Statistics publications
