= Vrlika =

Town in Split-Dalmatia, Croatia

- Town
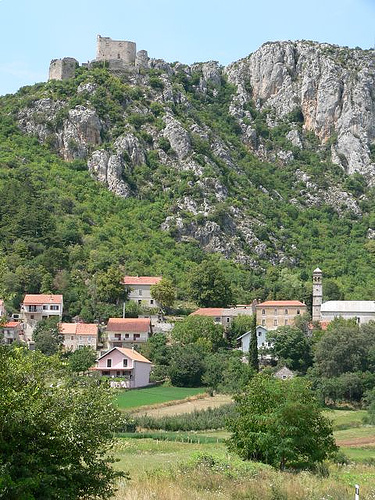
- Vrlika below Prozor Fortress

- Flag Seal

- Location of Vrlika within Croatia
- Coordinates: 43°55′N 16°24′E
- Country: Croatia
- Region: Dalmatian Hinterland
- County: Split-Dalmatia County

Government
  - Mayor: Jure Plazonić (HDZ)

Area
  - Town: 243.5 km^{2} (94.0 sq mi)
  - Urban: 7.6 km^{2} (2.9 sq mi)

Population (2021)
  - Town: 1,728
  - Density: 7.097/km^{2} (18.38/sq mi)
  - Urban: 718
  - Urban density: 94/km^{2} (240/sq mi)
- Time zone: UTC+1 (CET)
  - Summer (DST): UTC+2 (CEST)
- Postal code: 21236 Vrlika
- Area code: 021
- Climate: Cfb
- Website: vrlika.hr

Vrlika is a small town in inland Split-Dalmatia County, Croatia. The closest large towns are Sinj, Knin, and Drniš. Vrlika was given the status of town in 1997. Vrlika is an underdeveloped municipality which is statistically classified as the First Category Area of Special State Concern by the Government of Croatia.

== Location ==
Vrlika is located in the Cetinska Krajina region in Split-Dalmatia County. It is 40 km northwest of the town of Sinj on the State route D1 between the towns of Sinj and Knin and on the regional route which connects Vrlika and Drniš.

== History ==
The oldest evidence for human life in this region is from 30,000 BC. During the Bronze Age, between 1900 and 1600 BC, there was the so-called Cetina culture on the territory of Vrlika municipality. Archaeologists have found ancient graves, a Bronze Age sword and other smaller items dating back to that period. These findings made it clear that in the past this land was densely populated. Prior to the arrival of the Romans, the Illyrian tribe of Dalmatae are said to have inhabited the region. After multiple wars, lasting for as long as 250 years, in the year 9 AD they were finally defeated and annexed by the Romans.

The history of the town begins in the 7th century when it was formed a village on the spring of the river Cetina, in a field below the mountain Dinara. In the 9th century, probably during the time of Duke Branimir of Croatia, the Church of Holy Salvation "Crkva Sv. Spasa" was built near Vrlika, then called Vrh Rike. The church was built by old Croatian Gostiha of Cetina "Cetinski župan Gastika" in memory of his mother and his sons.

Vrlika was first mentioned in written sources in 1069, as the seat of Cetin County (Cetinska županija) – the old Croatian county, which included the towns of: Glavaš, Prozor, Sinj, Trilj, Stolac, Gradac, Nutjak, Tugare and Poljic parish (Poljička župa). Of the five old Croatian counties (Imotska, Zminjska, Kliška i Dridska) that were located in the area of the current Split-Dalmatia County, Cetinska County was the largest.

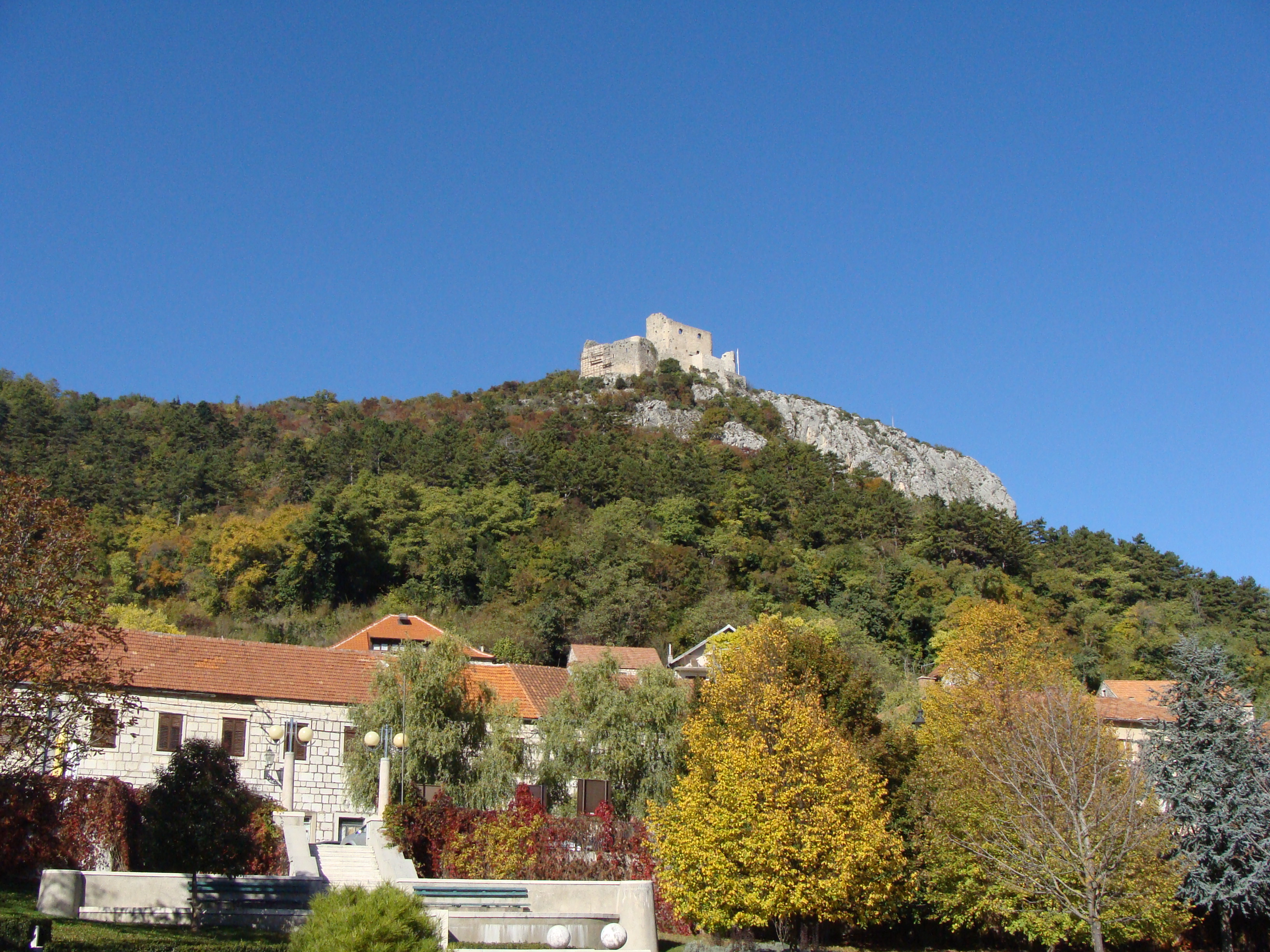
Prozor Fortress overlooking Vrlika

In the year 1406, King Ladislaus of Naples gave Prozor Fortress, at that time Castrum Werhlychky as a center of Vrlička župa, to the Bosnian nobleman Hrvoje Vukčić. During the medieval period, Vrlika, along with the rest of the Balkans, experienced invasion and subsequent occupation by the Ottoman Empire in 1522. During the Ottoman rule, the local population of Vrlika was forced to convert to Islam or leave. Many of the original settlers from Vrlika left for the island of Olib in the Adriatic Sea off the Croatian coast. During Ottoman rule, it was nahija centre as "Vrhrika" initially in Croatian vilayet of Sanjak of Bosnia between 1522 and 1537, laterly in Sanjak of Kilis between 1537 and 1688.

In 1688, the town was liberated from the Ottomans by the Republic of Venice as a result of the Morean War. Locally, the uprising against the Ottomans was led by Croatian priest Father Josip Bogić. It was again occupied by Ottomans briefly in 1715 during Ottoman–Venetian War (1714–1718). During French rule (1805–1814), Vrlika became a municipality in the Šibenik district. Franz Joseph I of Austria visited Vrlika in 1875 and noted impressions in his diary.

The town was part of the Republic of Serbian Krajina on August 26, 1991. It was liberated by Croatian troops on 5 August 1995 during Operation Storm.

== Demographics ==
In the 2021 census, the municipality had a total population of 1,728, in the following settlements:

- Garjak, population 54
- Ježević, population 167
- Koljane, population 21
- Kosore, population 134
- Maovice, population 250
- Otišić, population 39
- Podosoje, population 208
- Vinalić, population 137
- Vrlika, population 718
Town of Vrlika: Population trends 1857–2021
v

population	5920	6226	6311	7545	8727	9529	9819	10382	8686	8854	7366	6458	6262	5621	2705	2177	1728
	1857	1869	1880	1890	1900	1910	1921	1931	1948	1953	1961	1971	1981	1991	2001	2011	2021

Sources: Croatian Bureau of Statistics publications

== Historic, cultural and natural heritage ==
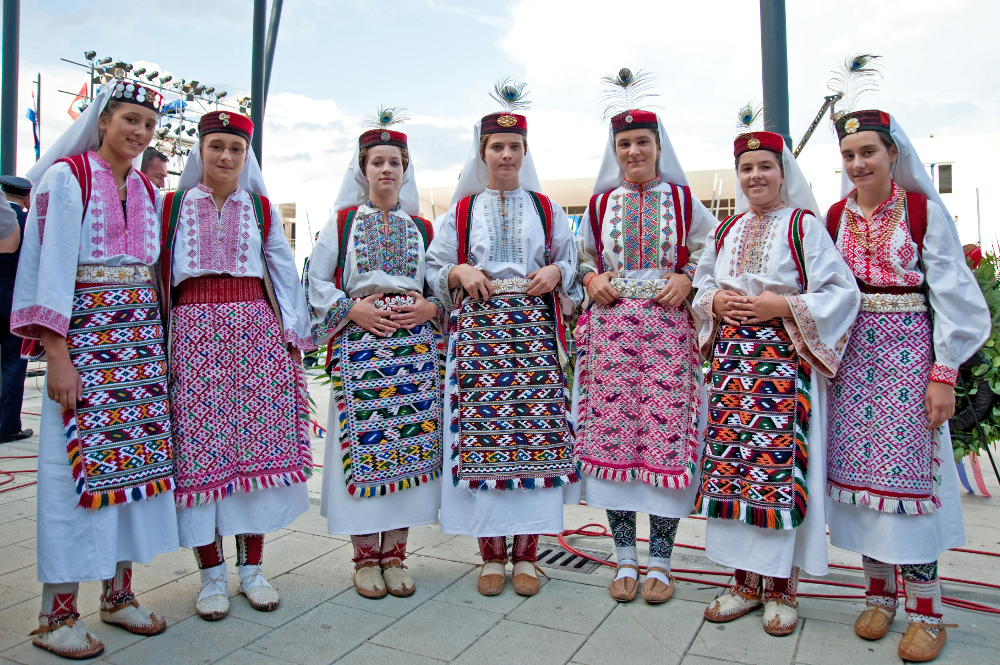
Folk costume of Vrlika

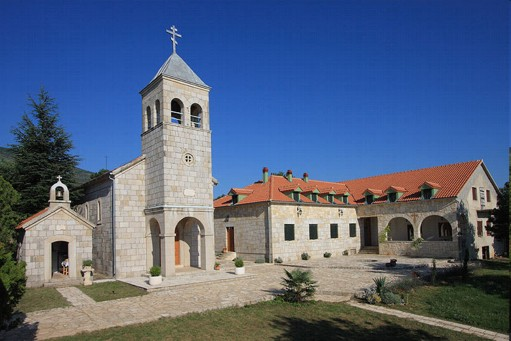
Dragović monastery

- Prozor Fortress – fortress from early history above the town of Vrlika, expanded at the beginning of the 15th century
- Glavaš - Dinarić Fortress – fortress from the 15th century, near the town of Vrlika
- Church of Holy Salvation – the ancient pre-schism church "Crkva Sv. Spasa" from 9th century in Cetina, near Vrlika
- Vrlika national costume – one of the greatest ethnographic treasures in Croatian folk costumes
- Vrličko kolo – silent folklore dance (kolo) from Vrlika
- Feast of Our Lady Ružarice – Catholic feast of "Gospe Ružarice", the city day of Vrlika
- Vrlička Česma – cultural site and park, genesis of famous Croatian opera "Ero sa onoga svijeta"
- Ero s onoga svijeta – a comic opera in three acts by Jakov Gotovac, with a libretto by Milan Begović based on a folk tale
- Cetina – spring of river Cetina, 7 km north from Vrlika
- Peruća Lake – a large artificial lake southeast of Vrlika
- Dinara – mountain located east of the town of Vrlika
- Svilaja – mountain located west of the town of Vrlika
- Čuvari Hristovog groba, Easter tradition

== Local government ==
The current city council of Vrlika has fifteen seats:

- Croatian Democratic Union: 11 seats
- Croatian Party of Rights: 3 seats
- Croatian Social Liberal Party: 1 seats

== Culture ==
Vrlika has a local branch of the Croatian cultural organization Matica hrvatska, as well as the Croatian Disabled Homeland War Veterans Association. Vrlika also has a folklore ensemble KUD "Milan Begović". Vrlika is the origin of the popular folklore dance, Vrličko Kolo, often performed by local cultural groups.

== Economy ==
Throughout the history of Vrlika, major basic economic activities have been agriculture, livestock breeding, and trade. In modern times tourism, hospitality, and information technology are also substantial, with a focus on the principles of sustainable development.

== Religion in Vrlika ==
Church of Sveti Spas – Pre-Schism Christian (9th century)

Built during the reign of Croatian duke Branimir in the 9th century, by župan Gostiha of Cetina, near Vrlika, then called Vrh Rike. This church is one of the most important in Croatia, as it is the only pre-schism church constructed with a bell tower that is still standing. 1,026 Old-Croatian ancient graves of great archaeological interest have been found in the vicinity of the church indicating that the culture of that time was under the influence of the Frankish Empire.

Dragović Monastery – Serbian Orthodox

Dragović monastery was founded between 16th and 17th century. Dragović is situated on a hill downstream of the Cetina River not far from Vrlika. Its location was shifted several times due to wars and the construction of a dam on Cetina River.

Church of Saint Nicholas – Serbian Orthodox (1618)

In 1618, the Orthodox church dedicated to Saint Nicholas is the oldest religious object built in Vrlika. Its bell tower was added and consecrated by hieromonk Vikentija (Stojisavljević) from Dragović monastery in 1801 and its current iconostas dates from the mid-19th century. Throughout the centuries, the church was the target multiple arson attempts during world wars and most recently, the Yugoslav Civil War. On May 28, 1972, the church was severely damaged in a fire set by Croatian nationalists during the Croatian Spring crisis, only to be restored two years later on May 26, 1974. Between 1990 and 1991, explosives were planted around the church several times by Croatian nationalists. In August 2018, the Serbian Orthodox inhabitants of Vrlika, along with many Vrlika Serbs from the diaspora congregated in Vrlika to celebrate the 400 year anniversary of the church.

Church of Holy Trinity – Uniate Church (1844)

The Uniate church of the Holy Trinity in Vrlika was devoted on May 28, 1844, by Croatian Greek Catholic hierarch Gavrilo Smiciklas. The dedication was attended by a multitude of local Serbian Orthodox Christians who converted to the Roman Catholic faith, Roman Catholic priests and clerics. With an increase of Serbian Orthodox parishioners converting to Catholicism, which started while Vrlika came under Venetian rule, on the same day Vrlika was visited by Serbian Orthodox bishop Jerotej Mutibarić who held an archiepiscopal service in the Orthodox Church of St. Nicholas.

Between the years 1844–1898, the church was used by converts and Roman Catholics alike. Once the Roman Catholic Church of Our Lady of Rosary was built, the Uniate church saw a steady decline in parishioners and the church began to fall into disrepair, as converts slowly began to distance themselves from their Orthodox heritage and self-identify as Roman Catholic Croats. The church was seriously damaged in an earthquake in 1970, when the roof collapsed, after which Communist authorities ordered the destruction of the church altogether. Today, a playground is on the site of where the church once stood.

Church of Our Lady of Rosary – Roman Catholic (1898)

Father Jure Bogić from Cetina established a Catholic parish of Annunciation of the Blessed Virgin Mary in 1688, and later Our Lady of the Rosary. The Roman Catholic parish church in Vrlika dedicated to the Nativity of the Virgin Mary (Croatian: Župna crkva Gospe Ružarice) was built from the year 1876 to 1898. The church was built on the site of a mosque, which was built on the foundations of an old Catholic church. This simple stone church dominates the Vrlika centre square. During the Second World War, the Catholic church in Vrlika sustained significant damage. In the front of the church stands a bronze bust dedicated to Filip Grabovac, who was born in the nearby village of Vinalić and died in Venice, Italy as a Croatian national hero. The exterior dimensions of the parish church are 27x10.30 metres. The Catholic Parish Church in Vrlika was badly damaged and desecrated during the recent Croatian War of Independence. The holy day of Gospe Ružarice, the protector of the Vrlika Catholic community, is celebrated annually during the first week of October.

== Notable people ==
- Filip Grabovac (1698–1749) – Franciscan priest and writer
- Milan Begović (1876–1948) – writer
- Milan Babić (1956–2006) – First President of the Republic of Serbian Krajina
