= Maovice =

- Location within Croatia
- Coordinates: 43°53′N 16°22′E
- Country: Croatia
- County: Split-Dalmatia
- City: Vrlika

Area
  - Total: 27.5 km^{2} (10.6 sq mi)

Population (2021)
  - Total: 250
  - Density: 9.1/km^{2} (24/sq mi)
- Time zone: UTC+1 (CET)
  - Summer (DST): UTC+2 (CEST)

Maovice is a small village in Split-Dalmatia county, Croatia. Maovice is a settlement in the Vrlika municipality, and has a population of 494. The majority of the population are Croats.

== Location ==
Located in inland Dalmatia, west from the town of Vrlika, on the route between towns of Drniš and Vrlika, Maovice spread on 27.57 km^{2} mainly on plateau Maovičko field (Maovičko polje), at an altitude of approximate 640–700 m, just under the north base of mountain Svilaja.

== History ==
In the 17th century, Maovice was largely settled by new inhabitants from Croatia and Bosnia. Austrians gave to the new inhabitants land in exchange for fighting against the Ottomans.

From 1869 to 1889 the settlement was called Mahovice, and from 1890 to 1910 Mavice. It consists of two villages, Gornje Maovice and Donje Maovice. Parts of a settlement are hamlets:

- Bijuk
- Donje Maovice
- Gornje Maovice
- Pod Umcem
- Radinje
- Svilaja

Between Gornje and Donje Maovice there is a small Catholic Church (crkva sv. Jure), which was built in 1901 on the foundations of an older Croatian Roman Catholic Church, of which there is only part of the wall facades left. The church is a one-longitudinal-nave structure and the external dimensions of the nave are 15x8 m. Sanctuary is square apses with dimensions of 4.5x6 m. A new bell-tower was added recently. In village there is an old Stechak, but it is unknown from what period.

In the 20th century at some point, Maovice had more than 1500 inhabitants. Some of them left because of poverty, others left for education and work in bigger towns. The most recent depopulation was as a result of war. As part of Operation Storm Maovice was liberated by the Croatian Army on August 6, 1995.
