= Svilaja =

Mountain range in Croatia

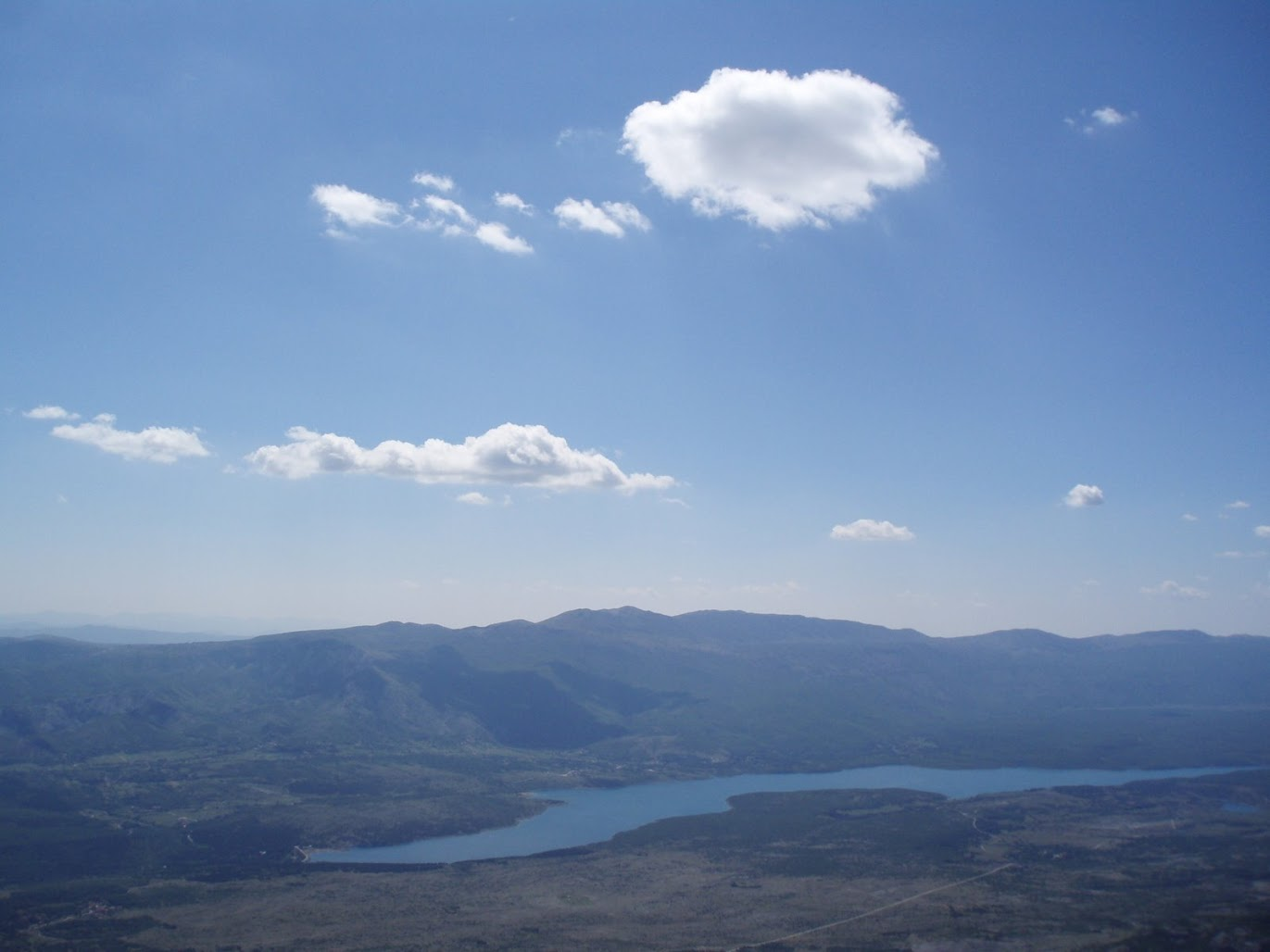
- Peruća lake in Svilaja mountain range

Highest point
- Elevation: 1,508 m (4,948 ft)
- Prominence: 1,066 m (3,497 ft)
- Listing: Ribu
- Coordinates: 43°48′35.12″N 16°26′37.63″E

Geography
- Location within Croatia
- Location: Dalmatia, Croatia
- Parent range: Dinaric Alps

Svilaja is a mountain range in Croatia, in the Dalmatian Hinterland.

It is part of the Dinaric Alps and stretches from the town of Sinj northwest to the Petrovo field, approximately 30 km in length. The highest peak is Svilaja or Bat at 1508 m.a.s.l. Some of the other northwest peaks are Jančak (1483 m), Kita (1413 m), Turjača (1340 m), and Lisina (1301 m) which is closest to the town of Vrlika.

From the nearest mountain cliff Veliki Kozjak (1207 m), which is a northwest continuation of Svilaja, it is separated by the saddle called Lemeš (860 m) above the village of Maovice.

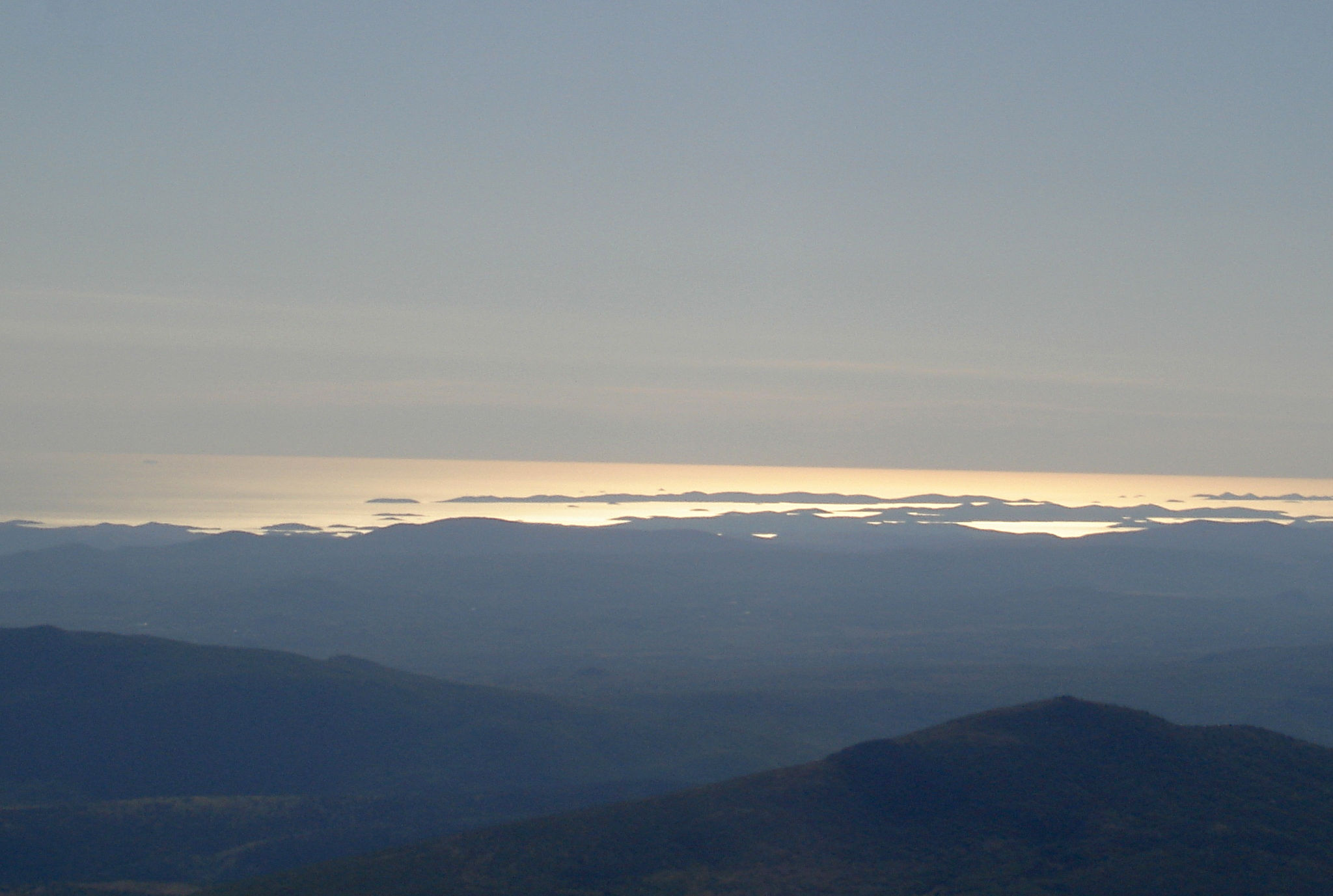
View from the top onto the Croatian Adriatic islands.

The Bat summit overlooks the Adriatic Sea, Peruća lake, and mountain ranges further in Bosnia and Herzegovina. The summit is approachable from the southeast, either by following an unpaved road from Donje Ogorje or by taking the marked trail from Orlove Stine mountain lodge. Northern parts of the mountain are deemed dangerous because of the mines left during the Croatian War of Independence.

== Mountain huts ==
In the 1937 and 1938 seasons, the mountain hut on Svilaja was under construction.

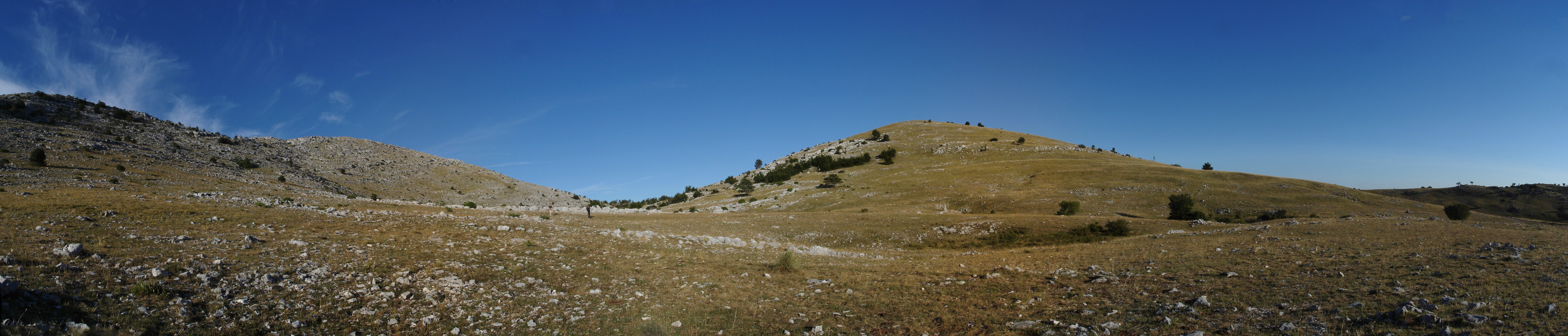
Svilaja's summit Bat (1508 m.a.s.l.).

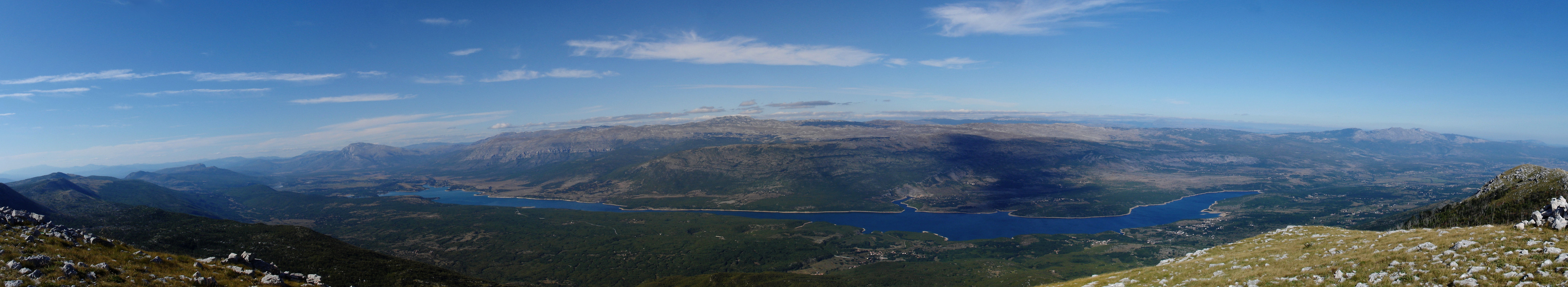
View from the top onto Peruća Lake and mountain Dinara.

== See also ==
- List of mountains in Croatia

== Bibliography ==
- Poljak, Željko (February 1959). "Svilaja". Kazalo za "Hrvatski planinar" i "Naše planine" 1898—1958 (PDF). Naše planine (in Croatian). Vol. XI. p. 19. ISSN 0354-0650.
