= Kosore =

Settlement in Split-Dalmatia County, Croatia

- Settlement
- Interactive map of Kosore
- Location within Croatia
- Coordinates: 43°55′52″N 16°24′32″E
- Country: Croatia
- County: Split-Dalmatia
- City: Vrlika

Area
  - Total: 5.1 km^{2} (2.0 sq mi)

Population (2021)
  - Total: 134
  - Density: 26/km^{2} (68/sq mi)
- Time zone: UTC+1 (CET)
  - Summer (DST): UTC+2 (CEST)
- Postal code: 21236 Vrlika
- Area code: +385 (0)21

Kosore is a settlement in the City of Vrlika in Croatia. In 2021, its population was 134.

== Demographics ==
Kosore: Population trends 1857–2021
v

population	310	287	294	332	398	469	507	608	658	653	626	609	482	431	238	191	134
	1857	1869	1880	1890	1900	1910	1921	1931	1948	1953	1961	1971	1981	1991	2001	2011	2021

Sources: Croatian Bureau of Statistics publications
