= Ljubibratić =

Ljubibratić (Serbian Cyrillic: Љубибратић) is a Serbo-Croatian surname, a patronymic derived from the masculine given name Ljubibrat. The family, or rather, brotherhood, descend from the Ljubibratić noble family active in the Trebinje and Konavle region between 1404 and 1432. It may refer to:

- Mićo Ljubibratić (1839–1889), Herzegovinian rebel
- Jeronim Ljubibratić (1716–1779), Habsburg military commander
- Stefan Ljubibratić (fl. 1687–1718), Metropolitan of Zahumlje and Dalmatia
- Savatije Ljubibratić (fl. 1687–1716), Metropolitan of Zahumlje and Dalmatia
- Damjan Ljubibratić (fl. 1596–1614), Serbian Orthodox monk and diplomat
- Radoslav Ljubibratić (fl. 1404), Bosnian nobleman

== See also ==
- Ljubobratić
