= Ljubibratić noble family =

Noble family

Ljubibratić
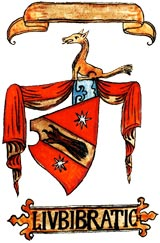
- Country: Kingdom of Bosnia
- Founded: before 1404

The Ljubibratić family (Serbian: Љубибратић) were a powerful noble family in (Hum) around Trebinje during the 14th and 15th centuries under the Bosnian Kingdom.

== History ==
Ljubibratić family were known to be warriors and also Serbian Orthodox priests. They were from Trebinje region, and were mentioned in Ragusan documents.

=== Notable members ===
- Damjan Ljubibratić (fl. 1596 – 1605), Serbian Orthodox monk and diplomat, the secretary of Patriarch Jovan Kantul (s. 1592–1614)
- Stevan Ljubibratić (fl. 1661 – April 1737), Serbian Orthodox bishop of Dalmatia
- Savatije Ljubibratić (fl. 1687 – d. 1716), Serbian Orthodox bishop and caretaker of the Dragović monastery
- Jeronim Ljubibratić (1716 – 1 November 1779), Ragusan military commander serving the Habsburg monarchy
- Mićo Ljubibratić (1839 – February 26, 1889), Serbian Orthodox priest and rebel leader in Herzegovina
