= The 100 most prominent Serbs =

Serbian book (1993)

The 100 Most Prominent Serbs
- First edition
- Author: Group of authors
- Language: Serbian
- Genre: Biography
- Publisher: Princip, Š-Jupublik
- Publication date: 1993
- Publication place: Yugoslavia (modern-day Serbia)
- Pages: 835

The 100 most prominent Serbs (Serbian: 100 најзнаменитијих Срба, romanized: 100 najznamenitijih Srba) is a book containing the biographies of the hundred most important Serbs as compiled by a committee of academicians at the Serbian Academy of Sciences and Arts. The committee members were Sava Vuković, Pavle Ivić, Dragoslav Srejović, Dejan Medaković, Dragomir Vitorović, Zvonimir Kostić, Vasilije Krestić, Miroslav Pantić and Danica Petrović. The book was published for the first time in 1993 on 20+617 pages, reprinted in 2001 and the third extended edition was printed in 2009 and 2013.

With the efforts of the president of the editorial board of the book Dejan Medaković, Milan Nedić was also included in the list. The editorial board had problems with the inclusion of Axis collaborators Nedić and Draža Mihailović; ultimately Mihailović was not included in the final list.

== The list ==
Rank	Name	Occupation
1	Stefan Nemanja (1113–1199)	Grand Prince of Serbia, founder of the Nemanjić dynasty and saint
2	Stefan the First-Crowned (1165–1228)	Grand Prince of Serbia from 1196 and the King of Serbia as the first Rascian king
3	Sava I (1174–1236)	First Archbishop of the Autocephalous Serbian Church, founder of Serbian law, diplomat, monk and saint
4	Domentijan (1210–1264)	Medieval writer, monk, philosopher and biographer
5	Stefan Milutin (1253–1321)	King of Serbia and saint
6	Teodosije the Hilandarian (1246–1328)	Clergyman, one of the most important Serbian writers in the Middle Ages
7	Danilo II (~1270–1337)	Serbian Archbishop, monk, chronicler and saint
8	Stefan Dušan (1308–1355)	Emperor of the Serbs and Greeks
9	Lazar of Serbia (1329–1389)	Medieval Serbian ruler and saint who made a last stand at the Battle of Kosovo
10	Miloš Obilić (unknown–1389)	Serbian knight and assassin of Ottoman sultan Murad I
11	Jefimija (1349–1405)	Poetess and saint
12	Prince Marko (1335–1395)	Medieval Serbian ruler
13	Stefan Lazarević (1377–1427)	Prince, despot and saint
14	Kir Stefan the Serb (14th–15th century)	Musicologist, composer and monk
15	Đurađ Branković (1377–1456)	Baron and despot
16	Makarije Sokolović (1500s–1574)	Archbishop of Peć and Serbian Patriarch, monk and saint
17	Ivan Gundulić (1589–1638)	Poet
18	Arsenije III Crnojević (1633–1706)	Archbishop of Peć and Serbian Patriarch
19	Pavle Nenadović (1703–1768)	Archbishop
20	Roger Joseph Boscovich (1711–1787)	Physicist, philosopher, theologian and polymath
21	Dositej Obradović (1739–1811)	Writer and linguist
22	Petar I Petrović-Njegoš (1748–1830)	Prince-Bishop of Montenegro, exarch and saint
23	Stefan Stratimirović (1757–1836)	Metropolitan of Karlovci and author
25	Karađorđe (1768–1817)	Revolutionary leader who fought for Serbian independence
24	Filip Višnjić (1767–1834)	Poet and guslar
26	Matija Nenadović (1777–1854)	Priest and writer
27	Veljko Petrović (1780–1813)	Military leader
28	Miloš Obrenović I, Prince of Serbia (1780–1860)	Prince of Serbia
29	Vuk Stefanović Karadžić (1787–1864)	Philologist and linguist who was the major reformer of the Serbian language
30	Konstantin Danil (1798–1873)	painter
31	Jovan Sterija Popović (1806–1856)	playwright and poet
32	Ilija Garašanin (1812–1874)	statesman
33	Petar II Petrović-Njegoš (1813–1851)	prince-bishop of Montenegro, poet and philosopher
34	Josif Pančić (1814–1888)	botanist and doctor
35	Mihailo Obrenović III, Prince of Serbia (1823–1868)	Prince of Serbia
36	Branko Radičević (1824–1853)	poet
37	Đuro Daničić (1825–1882)	historian and philologist
38	Svetozar Miletić (1826–1901)	politician and mayor of Novi Sad
39	Jovan Ristić (1831–1899)	diplomat, politician and writer
40	Kornelije Stanković (1831–1865)	composer
41	Ilarion Ruvarac (1832–1905)	historian, academic and Orthodox priest
42	Đura Jakšić (1832–1878)	poet, writer and painter
43	Jovan Jovanović Zmaj (1833–1904)	poet and doctor
44	Valtazar Bogišić (1834–1908)	jurist and a pioneer in sociology
45	Nicholas I of Montenegro (1841–1921)	Montenegrin king
46	Laza Kostić (1841–1910)	poet and writer
47	Stojan Novaković (1842–1915)	politician, historian, writer, academic
48	Peter I of Serbia (1844–1921)	Serbian king
49	Vladan Đorđević (1844–1930)	politician, mayor of Belgrade
50	Nikola Pašić (1845–1926)	politician
51	Nikodim Milaš (1845–1915)	Bishop of Dalmatia, theologian, author and saint
52	Svetozar Marković (1846–1875)	philosopher and author
53	Sima Lozanić (1847–1935)	chemist, professor and politician
54	Radomir Putnik (1847–1917)	military commander
55	Đorđe Krstić (1851–1907)	painter
56	Laza Lazarević (1851–1891)	writer, psychiatrist and neurologist
57	Simo Matavulj (1852–1908)	novelist
58	Pera Dobrinović (1853–1923)	actor
59	Milan I of Serbia (1854–1901)	king of Serbia
60	Mihajlo Pupin (1858–1935)	physicist and chemist
61	Živojin Mišić (1855–1921)	military commander
62	Stevan Sremac (1855–1906)	writer
63	Stepa Stepanović (1856–1929)	military commander
64	Jovan Žujović (1856–1936)	anthropologist, known as a pioneer in geology, paleontology and craniometry in Serbia
65	Stevan Mokranjac (1856–1914)	composer and music educator
66	Nikola Tesla (1856–1943)	inventor, mechanical and electrical engineer
67	Paja Jovanović (1859–1957)	painter
68	Vojislav Ilić (1860–1894)	poet
69	Ljubomir Stojanović (1860–1930)	politician, historian and academic
70	Bogdan Popović (1863–1944)	literary critic and professor
71	Branislav Nušić (1864–1938)	novelist, dramatist, satirist and diplomat
72	Jovan Cvijić (1865–1927)	geographer, anthropologist, professor, academic
73	Mihailo Petrović (1868–1943)	mathematician, professor and academic
74	Pavle Popović (1868–1939)	literary critic and historian, professor and academic
75	Slobodan Jovanović (1869–1958)	lawyer and politician
76	Miloje Vasić (1869–1956)	archaeologist
77	Jovan Dučić (1871–1943)	poet and diplomat
78	Radoje Domanović (1873–1908)	writer and teacher
79	Nadežda Petrović (1873–1915)	painter and early photographer
80	Branislav Petronijević (1875–1954)	scientist and philosopher
81	Borisav Stanković (1876–1927)	writer
82	Milan Rakić (1876–1938)	poet
83	Aleksandar Belić (1876–1960)	linguist and academic
84	Milan Nedić (1878–1946)	general and politician; Prime Minister of a puppet government
85	Isidora Sekulić (1877–1958)	prose writer and novelist
86	Petar Kočić (1877–1916)	poet and politician
87	Jovan Skerlić (1877–1914)	writer and literary critic
88	Milutin Milanković (1879–1958)	mathematician, astronomer, climatologist, geophysicist, civil engineer and popularizer of science
89	Nikolaj Velimirović (1881–1956)	Bishop of Ohrid and Žiča, theologian, author and saint
90	Petar Konjović (1883–1970)	composer
91	Vladimir Ćorović (1885–1941)	historian
92	Stevan Hristić (1885–1958)	composer
93	Jovan Bijelić (1884–1964)	painter
94	Alexander I of Yugoslavia (1888–1934)	ruler of Yugoslavia
95	Petar Dobrović (1890–1942)	painter
96	Ivo Andrić (1892–1975)	writer, Nobel Prize winner
97	Miloš Crnjanski (1892–1977)	writer, poet and diplomat
98	Sava Šumanović (1896–1942)	A prominent 20th century painter. His works are primarily Cubist, with Fauvist and Expressionistic aspects too.
99	Meša Selimović (1910–1982)	writer
100	Vasko Popa (1922–1991)	poet and academic

== See also ==
- List of Serbian saints
