= Nikodim Milaš =

Serbian bishop and saint (1845–1915)

Saint Nicodemus of Dalmatia
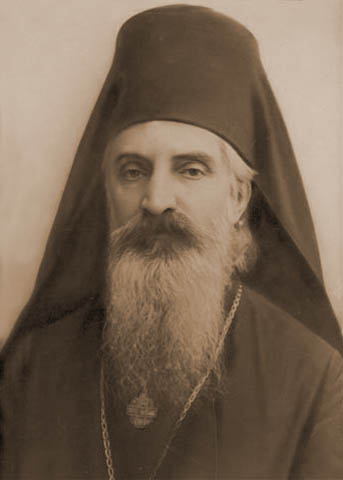
- Nikodim Milaš in the late 19th century

Venerable Hieroconfessor Bishop of Dalmatia, Canonist
- Born: Nikola Ante Valmassoni Milaš; 16 April 1845; Šibenik, Kingdom of Dalmatia, Austrian Empire (modern-day Šibenik-Knin County, Croatia)
- Died: 2 April 1915 (aged 69); Dubrovnik, Kingdom of Dalmatia, Austro-Hungary (modern-day Dubrovnik-Neretva County, Croatia)
- Honored in: Eastern Orthodox Church
- Canonized: 18 May 2025 by The Holy Synod of the Serbian Orthodox Church
- Feast: 21 September; 12 October

Nikodim Milaš (Serbian Cyrillic: Никодим Милаш; born Nikola Milaš, Serbian Cyrillic: Никола Милаш; 16 April 1845 – 2 April 1915), also known as Nicodemus of Dalmatia (Serbian: Никодим Далматински, romanized: Nikodim Dalmatinski) was a Serbian Orthodox bishop, theologian, university professor and academic. He was a writer, one of the most respected experts on Eastern Orthodox canon law, and less on church history. As a canon lawyer in Dalmatia, he defended the Serbian Orthodox Church against the state and he is regarded as the founder of canon law amongst the Serbs.

Milaš was a polyglot, fluently speaking eight languages. He authored a large number of books. His major work is Orthodox Church and Canon Law in six volumes. He also wrote Orthodox Dalmatia (1901), which was criticized and received a mixed critical reception. Over the course of more than 40 years of scientific work, Milaš's bibliography includes more than 180 works. Beyond his work in canonical and ecclesiastical law, he was dedicated to countering Roman Catholic proselytism and Austro-Hungarian efforts to downplay Serbian Orthodox heritage. He was one of the founders of the Serb People's Party in Dalmatia and served in the Diet of Dalmatia from 1889 to 1901.

For his work, he was awarded five state orders, elected a member of several scientific academies and societies, and included amongst The 100 most prominent Serbs. The Serbian Orthodox Church canonised him as a saint in 2025, ranking him as a hieroconfessor.

== Biography ==
=== Early life ===
His family hailed from Duvno and settled in Dalmatia at the end of the 17th century. Milaš was born in Šibenik in the Kingdom of Dalmatia (then part of the Austro-Hungarian Empire) on 16 April 1845, as an illegitimate son of his Serbian Orthodox father Trifun Milaš, who was originally from the area around Vrlika, and Italian Catholic mother Maria Valmassoni from Šibenik. His mother was a seamstress and his father engaged in small-scale trade. He was baptised in a Roman Catholic Church on 24 April as Nikola Ante Valmassoni (Milaš was added later), and three years later on 8 May 1848, in a Eastern Orthodox Church situated in Šibenik. He was baptised in accord with his father's wishes who was living in Istanbul in fear of Maria's familial feud. After his father's return to Dalmatia and the dispute had ended, his mother converted to Orthodoxy and became a devout follower of the faith. She married his father on 14 July 1851 in an Orthodox church.

=== Education ===
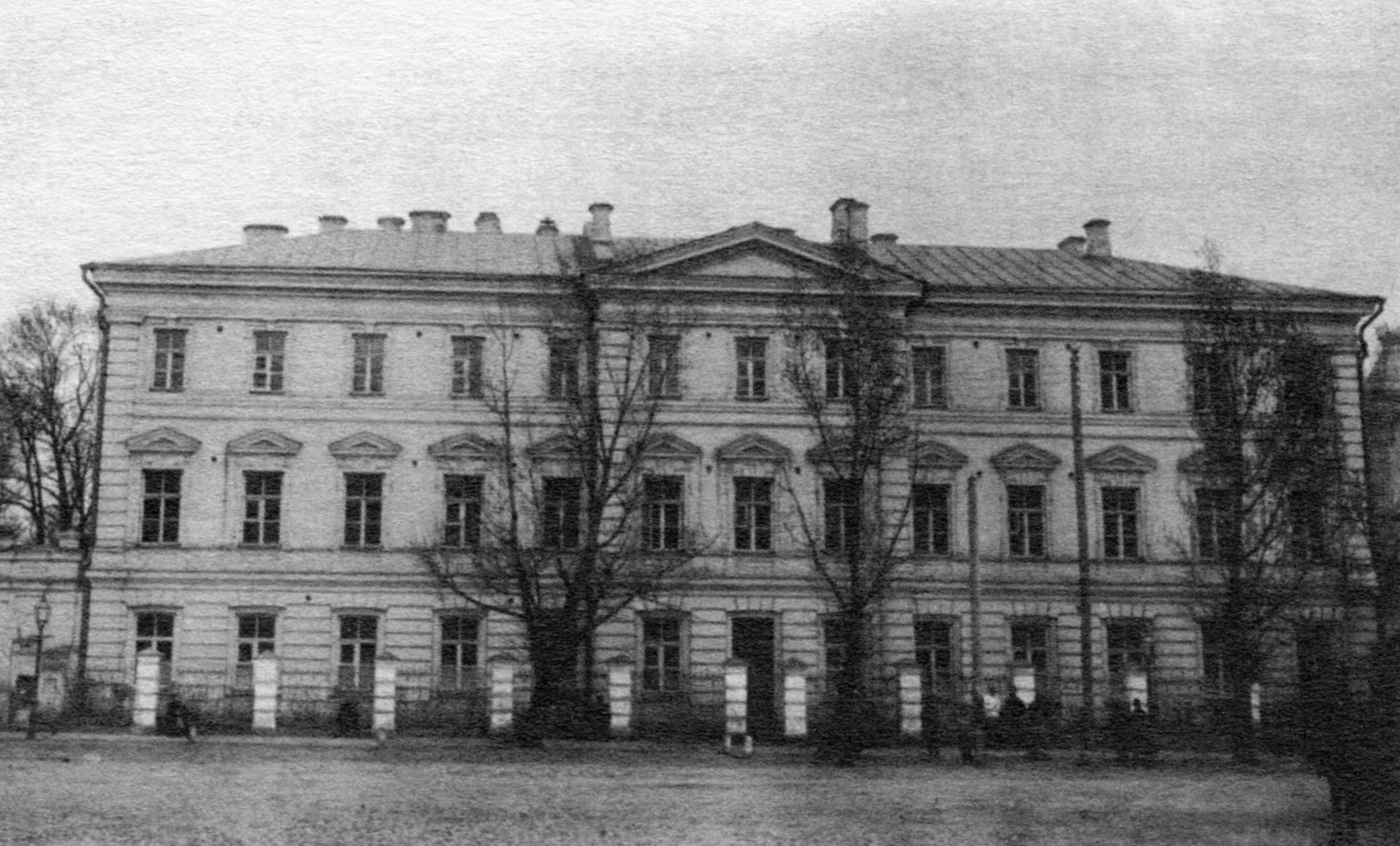
Kiev Theological Academy, Milaš's alma mater, one of the oldest and most prestigious theological schools of the time

He attended Šibenik primary school taught in Italian language by Franciscans, a Catholic religious order. Afterwards, he attended the lower Gymnasium of St. Dominic in Zadar, run by Dominicans, fourth class in the Jesuit gymnasium in Dubrovnik, and he took his matura again in Zadar in 1863. As a successful student, he skipped a grade in school received two scholarships. His wish was to study at one of the Europe's prestigious universities, but he was unable because his family did not have enough money to afford it. He went on to study theology in the Serbian Orthodox Theological School at Sremski Karlovci (1866), then philosophy in Vienna, but after a year, he moved to the Kievan Theological Academy and Seminary (then based in Imperial Russia), graduating in 1871. During his studies, he gave private lessons to the children of wealthy families to support himself. In his fourth year he published his first scientific work, which received positive reviews. He wrote his dissertation on the topic of Nomocanon of Patriarch Photius. and graduated as an outstanding student, obtaining a master's degree in Canon Law and Church History. He spent one year at the Theological School on Halki, probably in 1871–1872, where he improved his knowledge of Greek. He spoke very positively of his studies in Russia and even considered staying there but he abandoned that idea after learning of his father's death.

=== Early activity and rector of the Belgrade Seminary ===
Upon his return home, he was appointed as an assistant professor at the Seminary in Zadar (i.e. the Theological Orthodox Institute), a year later promoted professor of the canon law and practical theology, and soon afterwards taking the role as the dean of the seminary. Nikola Milaš was tonsured in 1873 at Dragović Monastery, and given the monastic name of Nikodim (Nicodemus). He took monastic vows at the invitation of Bishop Stefan Knežević after failing to secure marriage with Sofia, the daughter of a wealthy merchant.

Soon after returning from his studies in Russia, he became engaged in political life with aim of protecting Serbian interests. He wrote articles in Tršćanske novine, Zastava, Glas Crnogoraca and Srpski list. He participated in assemblies of Serbs in Dalmatia and the Adriatic coast, proposed candidates, wrote articles and pamphlets, initiated cooperation with local political parties, and generally maintained a firm stance on defending national interests. Beginning in 1873, he worked on raising national awareness and unity amongst Dalmatian Serbs with his friend Ljubomir Vujnović, which according to Milaš was a reaction to the stance held by some of Dalmatian Croats who were denying Serbs their national identity. As one of the founders of the Serb People's Party he led the conservative right-wing branch of the party. His public proclamations caused him further enmity amongst Croats, and he recalled in his memoirs, amongst many Serbs. He was often in conflict with Bjelanović over the editing aspects of the Srpski list newspaper and other matters; he was in favor of a more conservative political viewpoint.

Because of his fluency in German, French, Italian, Russian, English, as well as Greek and Latin, he was able to read primary sources and contribute to the field of history. He advocated for the Serbian language in secondary schools, organised and helped educational and humanitarian foundations, and engaged in missionary work fostering Orthodoxy and Serbian identity in Dalmatia. He also directed fiery passion at what he saw as proselytisation by the Roman Catholic Church's high priesthood.

In 1875, Milaš took part in the then-notable Bonn Reunion Conference, which focused on the potential reunion of the Eastern Orthodox Church and the Anglican Communion. He believed that this idea would yield no results. In the early 1880s, when Josip Juraj Strossmayer called for the unification of South Slavs with the veneration of Cyril and Methodius as a common Slavic heritage, and on his Roman Catholic initiative embarked on a multinational Slavic pilgrimage to Rome, which sparked a transnational and transconfessional debate, mostly amongst Serbs. Milaš published a monograph "Sts. Cyril and Methodius and the Truth of Orthodoxy". In this work, he contrasts the popes of Rome with the missionary brothers Cyril and Methodius, emphasising their importance for Orthodoxy and describing them as "great warriors of Orthodoxy ... in the battle against the enemies of Orthodoxy". He wrote this work as a response to Vatican claims about Cyril and Methodius that argued that the missionaries were not papal envoys but representatives of the Byzantine Orthodox Church. He used this occasion to argue that the issue presented a chance for dialogue between the two Churches, contrasting their relationship between Roman and Orthodox churches, where with the Roman Catholic took a practice of building churches next to Orthodox ones in Dalmatia. When Bosnia and Herzegovina came under Austrian rule, he believed that according to Eastern Orthodox canon law, all Serbian church metropolitans in Bosnia should come under jurisdiction of the Metropolitanate of Karlovci.

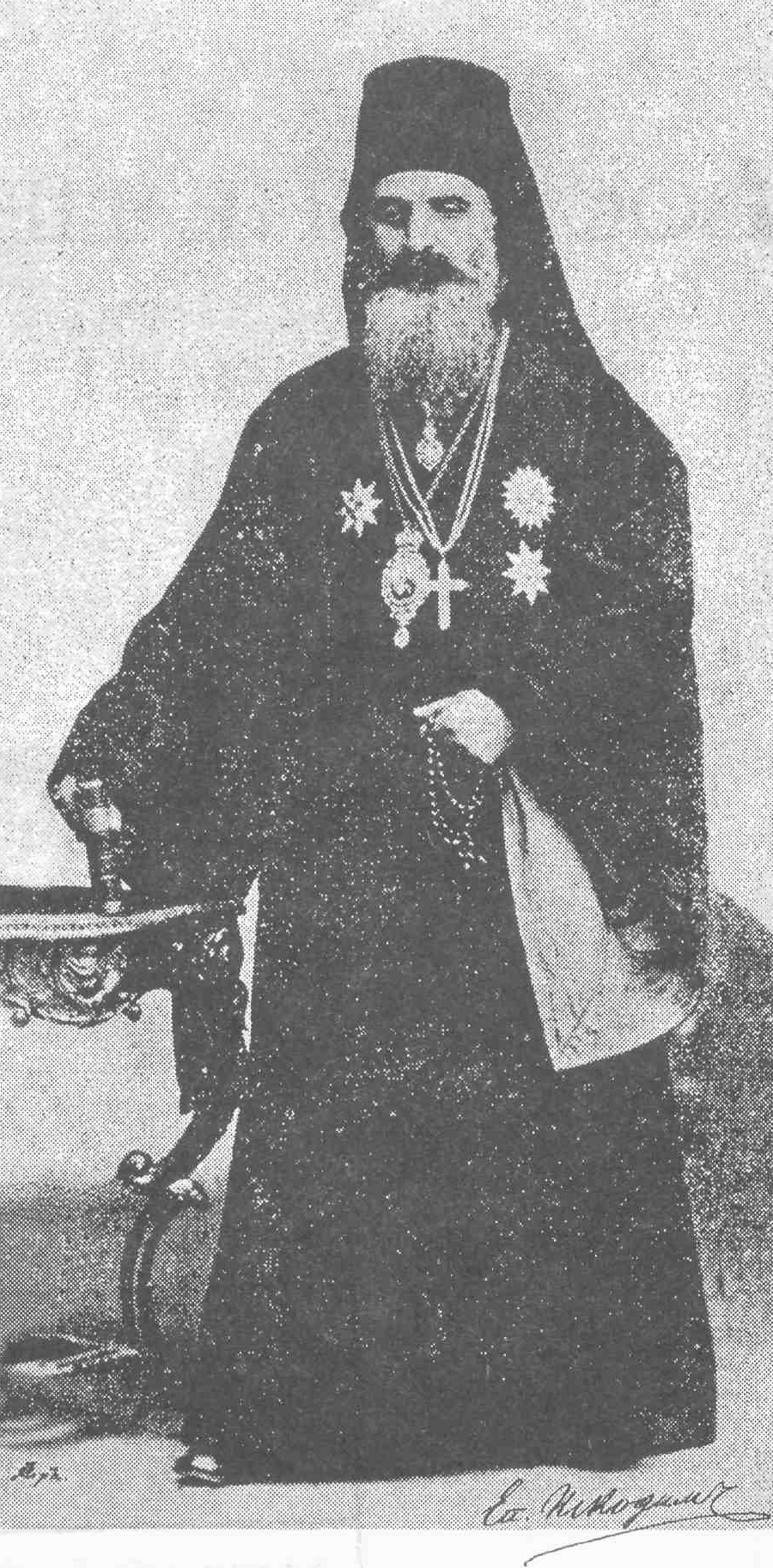
Undated portrait of Milaš wearing the vestments of a bishop, the cross he received upon being proclaimed Master of canon law, as well as several medals, including the Order of St. Sava (left medal)

In 1886 he went on to be rector of the Belgrade Seminary (Bogoslovija) in the Kingdom of Serbia. He tried to reform it to modern standards. The overall condition of the Seminary was poor, and Milaš took actions to improve the students’ living conditions and the overall discipline within the institution. As rector, he publicly advocated for importance of classical education among priests and all citizens of Serbia. His address on Saint Sava's Day (1887) on this subject provoked public debates and disputes concerning the significance of classical education. As rector of the Seminary, he was a regular member of the Main Educational Council of Serbian Kingdom, which decided on educational matters within its jurisdiction. In Belgrade, amidst an ongoing political conflict, he was accused by the liberal party of being an agent of the Vatican, which caused him distress. He received an offer from the Serbian Minister of Education and Religious Affairs, Vladan Đorđević, to establish a chair of canon law in Belgrade. He also received an offer from Bishop Georgije Branković to serve as rector of the Seminary in Sremski Karlovci. Milaš declined both offers due to his negative and unpleasant experience during earlier work in Belgrade. In 1905, minister Andra Nikolić offered him position of Metropolitan of Belgrade, but Milaš declined this offer as well. Deciding to distance himself from the unpleasant atmosphere of Belgrade, he went back in Zadar in early 1888. There, he completed two major works that same year: Roman Catholic Propaganda: Its Foundation and Rules Today (1889) and his six-volume treatise on the Serbian Orthodox Church entitled Orthodox Church and Canon Law (1890).

=== Bishop of Dalmatia, late activity and death ===
After the death of bishop Stefan Knežević (1806-1890), he was elected Bishop of Dalmatia and Istria (1890–1912), and appointed dean and professor of canon law at Zadar's Theological Orthodox Institute where he taught from 1890 to 1910. Working with other young professors and associates, Milaš transformed the institution by making lectures more relevant and engaging, which enhanced its reputation and attracted students from unprecedented regions such as Vojvodina, Serbia, and Herzegovina.

According to historian Stjepan Antoljak, his most valuable historical work was Documenta spectantia historiam ortodoxae dioeceseos Dalmatiae et Istriae a XV usque ad XIX saeculum (vol. I), published in 1899, with an unpublished second volume. Throughout his tenure, as he opposed the unification of the Eastern Orthodox and Roman Catholic Churches, Milaš was under pressure from anti-Serbian Orthodox authorities and forced to endure aggressive Roman Catholic proselytism. This motivated him to research and write the history of the Orthodox Church and Serbs in Dalmatia, published in 1901 as a book Pravoslavna Dalmacija (transl. Orthodox Dalmatia). However, the work is riddled with many exceptional claims, and received mixed critical reception.

As a bishop, he taught his clergy to keep accurate records and ensure that their congregants lived according to Christian piety. He managed to bring many Uniates back to Orthodoxy. He founded the Diocesan Assembly, a governing body for the eparchy, chaired by a bishop. Milaš oversaw the construction and renovation of libraries and clergy houses. He sought to educate a new, capable and learned clergy, as many priests had left his diocese. On Easter and Christmas, the Eparchy gave donations to the needy people regardless of their religion or ethnicity.

Milaš established correspondence with the Russian tsar, lobbying for equal rights for Orthodox Christians. In 1896, he had an audience in Vienna with Franz Joseph I of Austria, who accepted his proposal to open a gymnasium for Serbo-Croatian-speaking students in Zadar. In 1897, the gymnasium was opened becoming the first school in which Serbo-Croatian was the primary teaching language.

Due to his political activity he was targeted by secret police and members of the intelligentsia. During his episcopal service, he was repeatedly the target of slander and conspiracies, organized both by Orthodox Serbs and by Catholics, who sought his dismissal and replacement with another bishop. In 1896, Minister Benjamin Kállay filed a report with the authorities in Vienna against Milaš, accusing him of "anti-state activity" for his participation and speech at the 1896 Vidovdan Assembly. He continued to be politically active in the right-wing sector of the Serb Party serving in the Diet of Dalmatia (1889–1901). He withdrew from politics by 1903 after a period of party strife. With the ongoing Croat-Serb Coalition (1905), Milaš refused to participate in the Zadar Resolution (14 November 1905), possibly due to his rising unwelcoming attitude towards Croats, as expressed in Orthodox Dalmatia a few years prior.

He founded the newspapers Primorski srpski list (1903) and Novi srpski list published for a short period. For a number of years, he was the main editor of Glasnik prasvoslavno-dalmatinske crkve, and around 1873 a contributor and editor of Srpsko-dalmatinski magazin. Additionally, he collected and published Serbian folk songs in Srpsko-dalmatinski magazin.

With the approval of Prince Nicholas I of Montenegro, Metropolitan Mitrofan Ban requested Milaš to draft the necessary statutes for the Orthodox Consistories and the Holy Synod in Montenegro. Milaš's work provided foundation for the Cetinje Consistory established on 2 January 1904, the first in Montenegro.

Rules (Κανόνες) of Orthodox Church with commentary, Russian edition (1911)

Under pressure from civil authorities and other affairs, Milaš forcibly retired from the position of Bishop of Dalmatia in early 1912. Such retirement was an uncommon occurrence. It is thought that it was caused by the scandal surrounding the prolonged embezzlement of various funds and other goods of the Orthodox municipality. A state investigation confirmed that bishop Dositej Jović was responsible for the embezzlement and use of the funds for personal needs. The scandal resulted in the suicide of bishop Jović on 12 October 1910, then bishop of Kotor and consistory treasurer in Zadar. Jović wrote in his last letter: "There is my fault too, but it is more prevalent on the other, higher side" (with the phrase "higher side" alluding to Milaš). In the Serbian public and media the scandal was perceived as a significant disappointment and disgrace. According to bishop Sava Vuković, the government used this opportunity to push Milaš out because he was considered 'fanatically Orthodox'. In late 1911, the administrative board of the Orthodox priest association of the Dalmatian eparchy published a circulaire, which Milaš received in January 1912. It blamed him and held him morally responsible for the losses, while reports suggest that priests from Zadar had spoken of embezzlement as early as 1901.

After retiring, he devoted himself to scientific work. He wrote an Autobiography based on his extensive manuscript legacy, and published in 1983 and 2005. It is preserved in the Archive of the Serbian Academy of Sciences and Arts. He stated that he wrote the autobiographical work because of numerous jealous individuals with whom he had difficulties during his life, and whom he believed would attempt to tarnish his reputation after his death. Milaš's work is considered among the more significant and richer autobiographical writings done by church figures of that period.

In 1914 Austria-Hungary declared war against Serbia. Milaš was sick and in a hospital in Rogaška Slatina, Styria. During this time, the police searched his apartment and took possession of some of his private correspondences and latest work Crkva i država u Austro-Ugarskoj. Milaš died in Dubrovnik on 2 April 1915, which fell onto a Good Friday. He was subsequently buried there. On 4 October 1930 his relics were transferred to Šibenik and buried the next day "in a special chapel at the St. Salvation church".

== Views ==
Milaš shared Vuk Karadžić's viewpoint that all speakers of the Shtokavian dialect were ethnic Serbs. He was an Italophile.

In his writing, he was critical of the lifestyle of the Patriarch of Karlovci and his Patriarchate Court in Sremski Karlovci, stating, "The patriarchal court [...] resembled more the court of a rich Hungarian prince with worldly luxury and enjoyment, than a sacred centre: there a person could find everything, except what could nourish him religiously and devoutly dispose him." Milaš held an explicitly negative opinion of Josip Juraj Strossmayer. He held him responsible for the irreparably poor state of Serb-Croat relations, saw him as the grey eminence of aggressive Croatian politics, and accused him of refusing to recognize the identity of Orthodox Serbs in Dalmatia, seeking instead to convert them to Catholicism. Milaš had a suspicion and sometimes rigid attitude toward Roman Catholic Serbs. He opposed Sava Bjelanović's idea that the Serb national identity could be defined without religious identity, and he equated Serb identity with Eastern Orthodoxy. He critiqued Vatican policies and refuted Pope Leo XIII's encyclical Grande Munus.

In his work, Milaš was primarily a polemicist and apologist, without pretensions of being an innovator of new theological insights or concepts. Rather, he was more of an interpreter of tradition, its historical context, and its contemporary relevance. He chose themes for his theological work based on the needs of his people. Milaš's works in church history largely have an apologetic character. They were written to defend the position of Orthodox Serbs in Dalmatia and to counter Roman Catholic claims about the "newcomers — Eastern schismatics". His professor and academic role model was the historian, academic, and priest Ilarion Ruvarac. His approach sometimes distanced him from the historical-critical principles of Ilarion Ruvarac, with whom, as well as with his brother Dimitrije Ruvarac, he maintained correspondence. Although he did not fully belong to Ruvarac's critical school, he was much closer to it than to the "romantics" led by Panta Srećković. His work can be seen as positioned between these two currents.

Contemporaries described Milaš as exceptionally hardworking and committed, working on his writing between 10 and 14 hours every day.

== Legacy ==
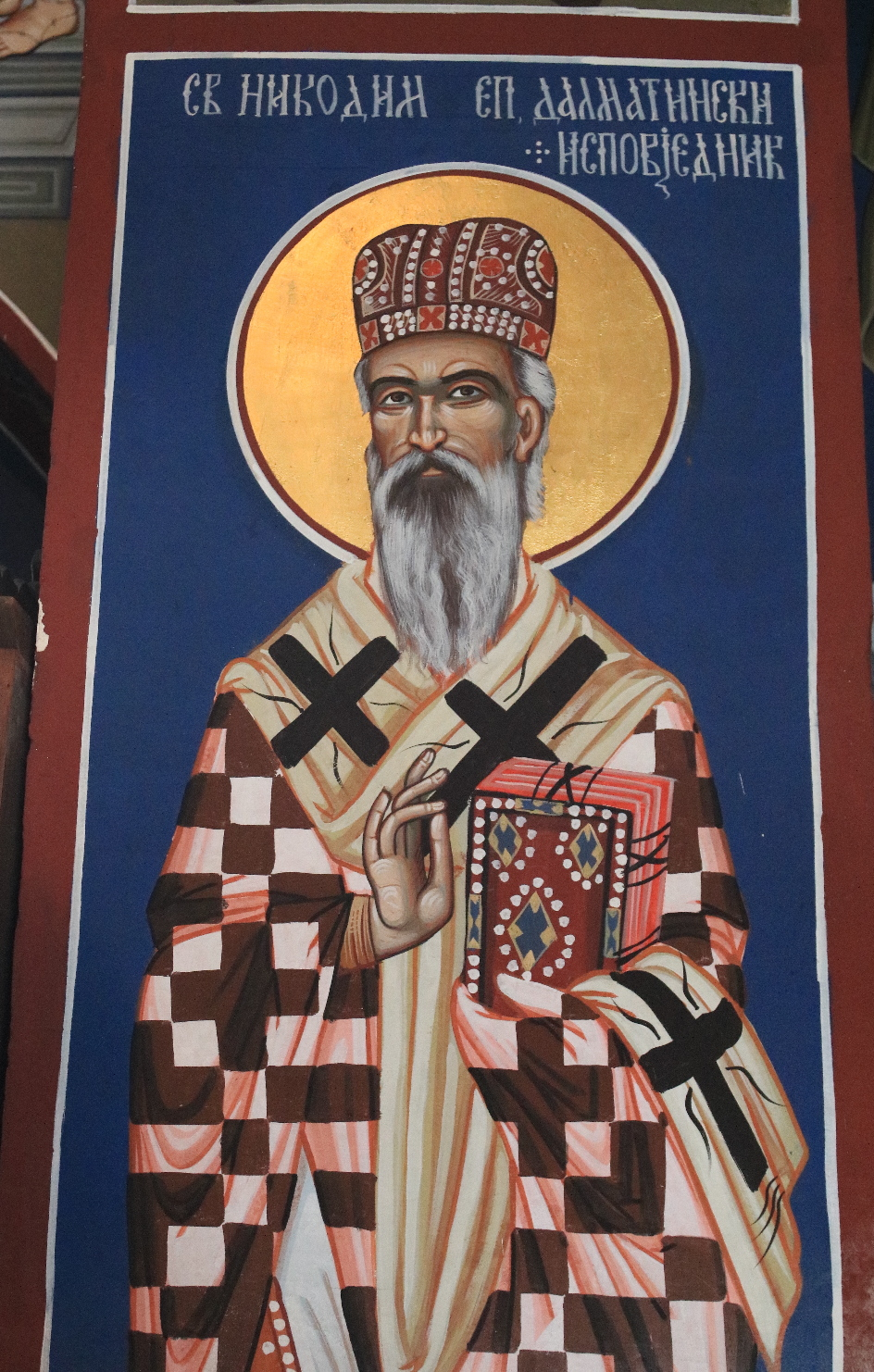
Fresco depicting Saint Nicodemus of Dalmatia at Krka Monastery

In contemporary historiography, he is regarded amongst the Serbs as the founder of canon law. He was one of the most respected experts and authorities on Eastern Orthodox canonical and ecclesiastical law. Moreover, some authors consider him the leading church canonist in recent history and regard some of his works as definitive on the subject. Church historian Nikanor Ružičić and historian Dimitrije Ruvarac praised his works on church law. Although his career as a church historian was less prominent and was influenced by ideological motivation, he nonetheless remains amongst the more notable Serbian church historians. Although some of his hypotheses were refuted, his works continues to be influential and relevant.

His bibliography includes more than 180 published works, either books or texts in various magazines. Simeon Stanković published his full bibliography. His collected works were published in 7 volumes. He produced a number of collections of canonical texts and was particularly interested in the churches of North Africa in the Roman period. He was largely active on the matter of Church-State relations, a subject which preoccupied most of his work. Most of his work was translated into Russian, German, Romanian, Bulgarian and Greek, and has greatly influenced modern Orthodox canonists. He translated The Constitution (Syntagma) of the Divine and Sacred Canons by Rallis and Potlis, and placed his commentaries in the context of previous Biblical hermeneutic works.

Milaš's correspondence was highly significant. He corresponded with leading church historians and theologians from both East and the West, but it has been lost or destroyed.

=== Orthodox Dalmatia ===
Milaš, motivated by political and ecclesial circumstances in Dalmatia that were not in accordance with his vision, began writing Pravoslavna Dalmacija (transl. Orthodox Dalmatia) published in 1901. The work reportedly was based on Simeon Končarević's chronicle, an unconfirmed source. It received mixed reviews at the time of its publication, and by modern scientific standards is regarded as an unreliable or pseudoscientific work. According to Croatian historian Stjepan Antoljak, it is "tendentiously" written, and "the goal of this book was clear and full of unverified claims and fabrications, which even today are not fully noticed and not pointed out, and not completely refuted", while the Serbian historian Tibor Živković concluded that "his work for the time period is very poor in valid scientific apparatus and burdened with the writer's stated goal contained in the very title of his work" and that the "assessment of Milaš's book Orthodox Dalmatia was given in 1903 by historian Jovan Radonić, so its place in historiography has long been established and there is no need to recall all the shortcomings of that work".

Due to his relation to the Serbian romantic nationalist ideology of the 19th and early 20th century, Milaš in the work claimed, fabricated and invented a number of factual inaccuracies about the history of Dalmatia, pre-Ottoman presence of Serbs, and foundation of Serb Orthodox monasteries and churches in Dalmatia, which influenced Serbian national historiography and nationalist sentiment. Amongst his controversial claims are that are that Orthodoxy in Dalmatia can be traced to Apostolic Age; that the Serbs settled in Dalmatia in the fourth century and arrived there before the Croats; that the region was ethnically Serbian until the 9th–11th century when Croatian rulers "imposed Catholicism and Croatism on the Serbs", as Cyril and Methodius were Orthodox (before the East–West Schism) and baptised the Croats to Eastern Orthodoxy, who formally became Catholics after the coronation of "treacherous" Croatian king Demetrius Zvonimir (1075); that the Serbs re-settled Dalmatia in the 14th–15th century as the Vlachs of Croatia represented a new wave of Serbs; and that Dalmatia was exclusively settled by Serbs during the Ottoman period, amongst others. Milaš also claimed that the Serbian Orthodox monasteries of Dragović, Krka and Krupa, as well as other churches in Dalmatia, were founded around 14th–15th century. His work was inspired and guided by an idea of continuous intolerance towards Serb Orthodoxy in Dalmatia, Milaš was highly critical and made heavy accusations against the pope and Roman church. He claimed that the Croats initially were Orthodox Christians, and sacral heritage of Split was part of Serbian Orthodox heritage. He promoted a black-and-white thinking, arguing that everything related to Orthodoxy and Serbs is positive, in comparison to Catholicism and Croats that are negative. As summarised by Vjekoslav Perica, "Milaš views the religious history of Dalmatia and Croatia as a history of hatred and intolerance of ethnic Serbs under Venetian and Austria rule", and Milaš "laid the foundations of Serbian ecclesiastical historiography (which coincides with the nationalist perspective in the secular Serbian historiography) on the assumption that Serbs and Croats were ethnically the same people, predetermined to form a unified Slavic (Orthodox) nation, had the popes not intervened and prevented these two fraternal Slavic peoples from becoming all Greek Orthodox."

The book was reprinted in 1989 in Belgrade, receiving praise from a Serbian editor and coinciding with the period when nationalism, including Serbian nationalism, was rising in a lead up to the breakup of Yugoslavia. Croatian church historians Stanko Bačić and Mile Bogović have contended that the re-printing of such ideas was used as argument and justification for Serbian politics during the Yugoslav Wars. Sabrina P. Ramet shares this view. Danish historian Emil Hilton Saggau notes how his work echoed the "many classic Serbian historical arguments used during the war in Croatia and Bosnia".

=== Honours and awards ===
Milaš was an honorary member of the Moscow Theological Academy, Saint Petersburg Theological Academy, the Bulgarian Slavic Charitable Society in Sofia, corresponding member of the Serbian Academy of Sciences and Arts (SANU), member of the Society for recent history of Austria in Vienna, the Society of Philologists in Athens, Matica Dalmatinska, Matica srpska, the Serb Archaeological Society and the Society of Saint Sava in Belgrade. The Faculty of Orthodox Theology in Chernivtsi awarded him an honorary doctorate, for his work Dostojanstva u pravoslavnoj crkvi.

He is included in the 100 most prominent Serbs, compiled by a committee of academicians at the Serbian Academy of Sciences and Arts.

A street in Palilula is named after him. In 1994, a bust of Milaš was erected at the source of the Cetina river, but it was damaged during the war in Croatia in 1995.

State order	Country	Date
Order of Franz Joseph, Commander	Austro-Hungarian Empire	1894
Order of Prince Danilo I, 2nd Class	Principality of Montenegro	1895
Order of the Iron Crown, 2nd class	Austro-Hungarian Empire	1898
Order of St. Sava, 1st Class	Kingdom of Serbia	1902
Order of St. Anna, 1st Class	Russian Empire	1905

=== Sainthood ===
In 2012, he was locally glorified as a saint by the Eparchy of Dalmatia of the Serbian Orthodox Church. He was canonised by the Serbian Orthodox Church with the feast day being 21 September and 12 October.

== Selected works ==
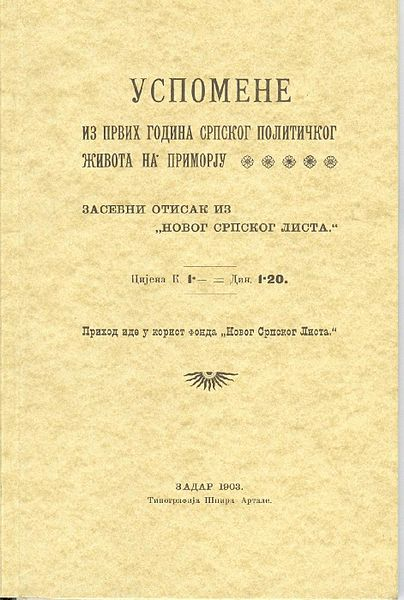
Uspomene (transl. Memories; 1903)

- Historical-Canonical view on establishment of Serbo-Romanian Metropolis of Bukovina and Dalmatia (1873)
- Clerical dignities in the Orthodox Church (1879)
- Slavic Apostles Ss. Cyril and Methodius (1881)
- Codex canonum ecclesiae africane (1881)
- St. Sava's Kormchya Book (1884)
- Das Synodal-Statut der orth. Oriental Metropolie der Bukowina i Dalmatien mit Erläuterungen (1885)
- Roman Catholic Propaganda, its foundation and rules today (1889; translated in Russian 1889, and in Bulgarian 1890)
- Question of Eastern Church and task of Austria in it (1889; 1890 translated in Romanian and German)
- Orthodox Church and Canon Law in six volumes (first edition 1890; second revised edition 1890, translated in Russian 1897, in German 1897, in Bulgarian 1903)
- Rules (Κανόνες) of Orthodox Church with commentary (I 1895, II 1896)
- Documenta spectantia historiam orthodoxae dioeceseos Dalmatiae et Istriae a XV usque ad XIX saeculum (I, 1899)
- Pravoslavna Dalmacija (transl. Orthodox Dalmatia; 1901)
- Rimokatoliškata propaganda, nejnoto načalo i segašnoto j ustrojstvo (transl. Roman Catholic Propaganda: Its Foundation and Rules Today; 1901)
- Principles of jurisdiction in Orthodox Church
- Orthodox Monasticism (Mostar, 1902)
- Uspomene (transl. Memories; 1903)
- Rukopoloženje kao smetnja braku (1907)
- Crkveno kazneno pravo, Mostar (1911)
- Bezbračnost episkopa (1920)
- Ikonomija u crkvenom pravu (1924)

== See also ==
- History of the Serbian Orthodox Church
- List of Serbian saints

== Notes ==
1. During the on-going Russian invasion of Ukraine, to tackle the St. Basil's "Rule Thirteen" ("soldiers who killed in war may be refused communion for three years"), the "Orthodox internet resources typically tackle this problem using Serbian bishop Nikodim's interpretation of canon law, "implied that Rule Thirteen is only a private opinion (theologoumenon) of an established theologian, not an official theological position held by the Church".

== Sources ==
- Kalinić, Vojin (2009). Doprinos Nikodima Milaša kulturnom preporodu Srba u Dalmaciji. Šibenik: Istina. ISBN 978-86-82555-43-8.

Eastern Orthodox Church titles
Preceded by Stefan Knežević	Bishop of Dalmatia; 1890–1911	Succeeded by Dušan Pantelić
