= Eparchy of Dalmatia =

Diocese of the Serbian Orthodox Church

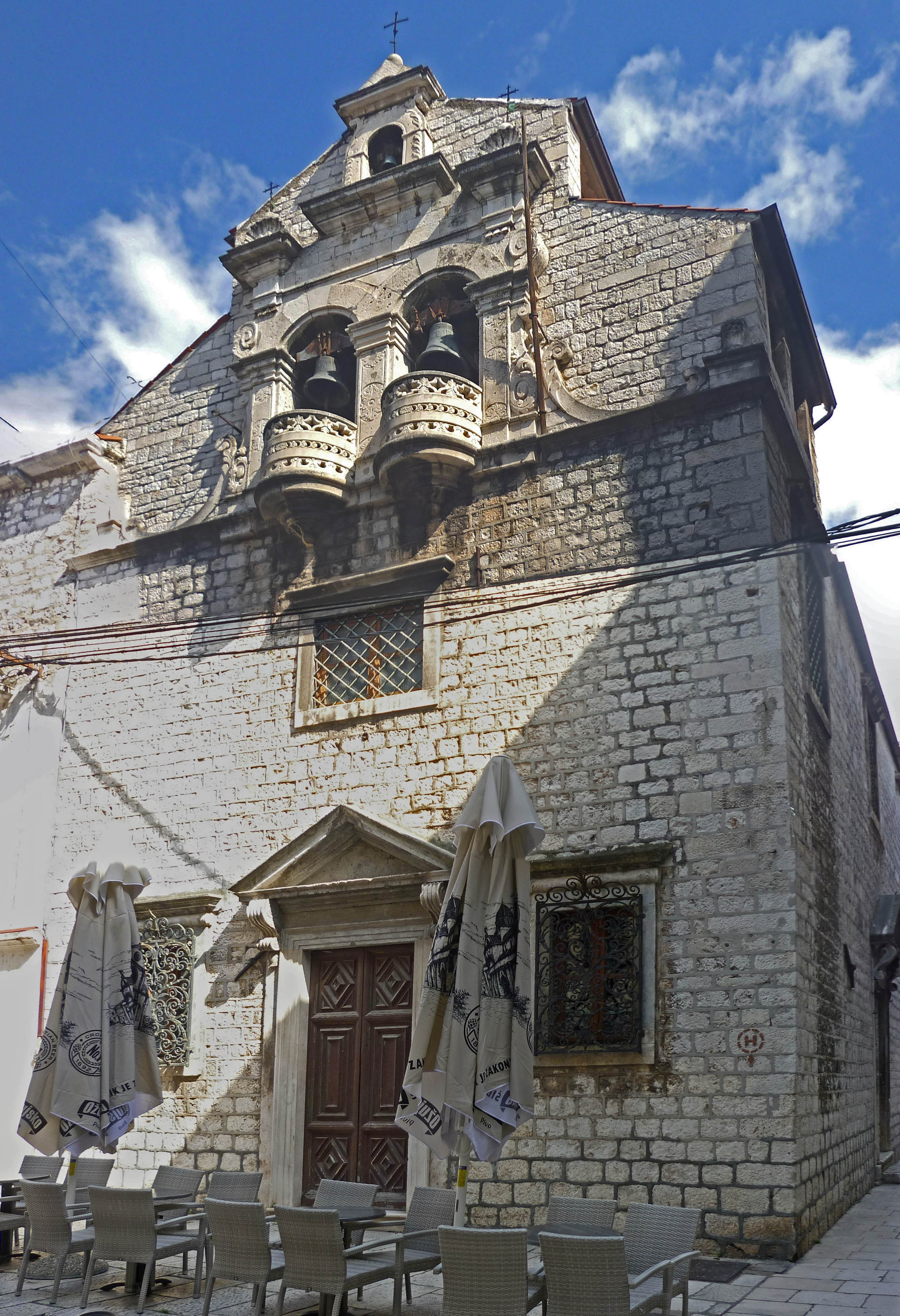
- Cathedral of the Dormition of the Theotokos, Šibenik

Location
- Territory: Dalmatia
- Headquarters: Krka Monastery

Information
- Denomination: Eastern Orthodox
- Sui iuris church: Serbian Orthodox Church
- Established: 1692
- Cathedral: Cathedral of the Dormition of the Theotokos, Šibenik
- Language: Church Slavonic, Serbian

Current leadership
- Bishop: Nikodim Kosović

Map

Website
- Eparchy of Dalmatia

The Eparchy of Dalmatia (Serbian: Далматинска епархија; Croatian: Dalmatinska eparhija) is a diocese (eparchy) of the Serbian Orthodox Church, having jurisdiction over the region of Dalmatia, in Croatia.

The episcopal see is located at the Cathedral of the Dormition of the Theotokos, Šibenik. Its headquarters and bishop's residence are located at Krka Monastery.

== History ==
After World War I and the creation of the Kingdom of Yugoslavia, the eparchy was united with other Serbian ecclesiastical provinces to form the unified Serbian Orthodox Church, a process completed in 1920.

== List of bishops ==
- Nikodim Busović (1693–1705)
- Savatije Ljubibratić (1705–1716)
- Stevan Ljubibratić (1716–1722)
- Simeon Končarević (1751–1762)
- Venedikt Kraljević (1810–1823)
- Josif Rajačić (1829–1834)
- Pantelejmon Živković (1834–1836)
- Jerotej Mutibarić (1843–1853)
- Stefan Knežević (1853–1890)
- Nikodim Milaš (1890–1910)
- Dimitrije Branković (1913–1920)
- Danilo Pantelić (1921–1927)
- Maksimilijan Hajdin (1928–1931)
- Irinej Đorđević (1931–1947)
- Nikanor Iličić (1947–1951)
- Simeon Zloković (1951–1959)
- Stefan Boca (1959–1978)
- Nikolaj Mrđa (1978–1992)
- Longin Krčo (1992–1999)
- Fotije Sladojević (1999–2017)
- Nikodim Kosović (2017–present)

== Notable monasteries ==
- Krka
- Krupa
- Dragović
- Dalmatinska Lazarica

== Gallery ==
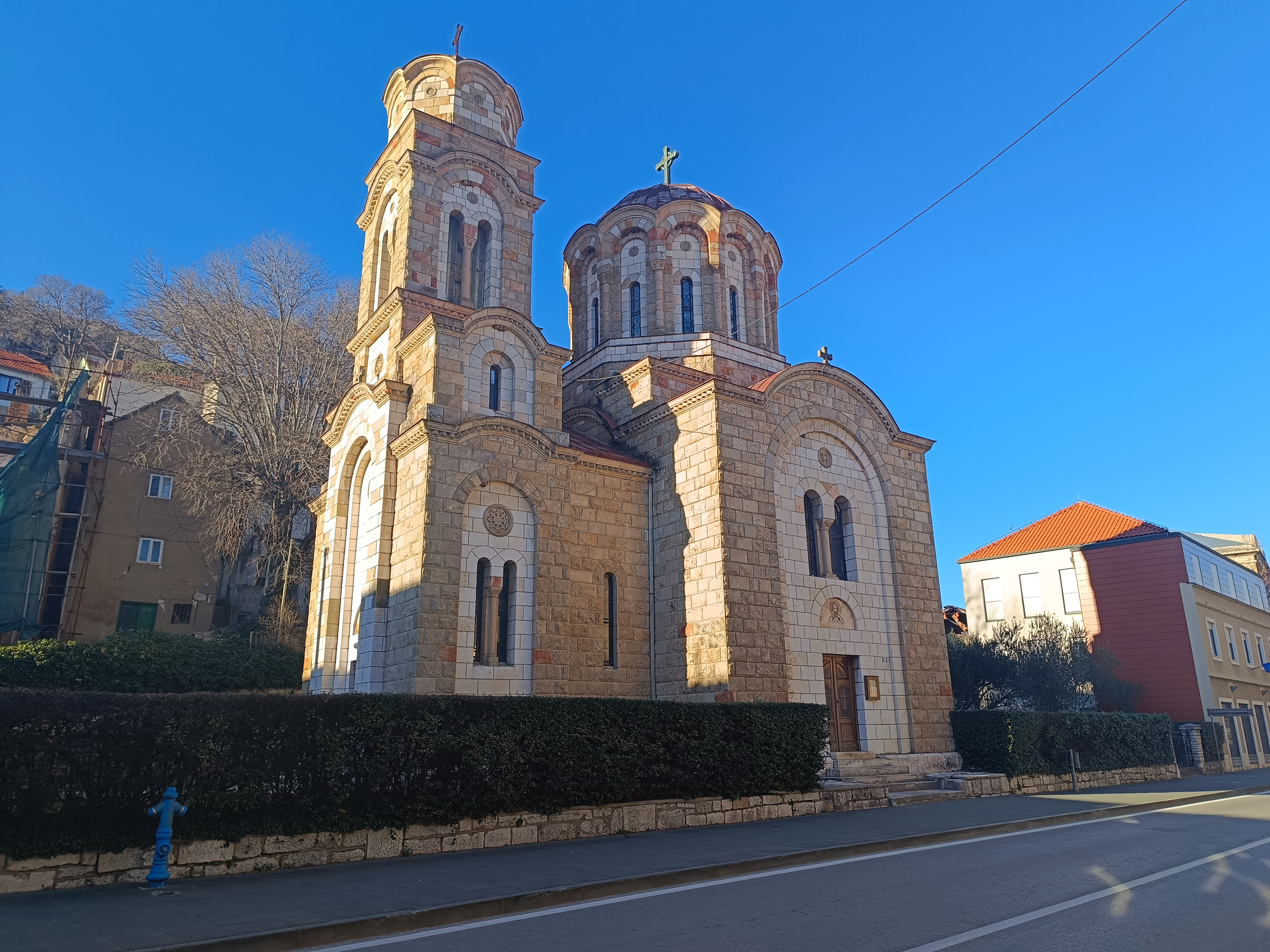
Church of the Intercession of the Theotokos, Knin

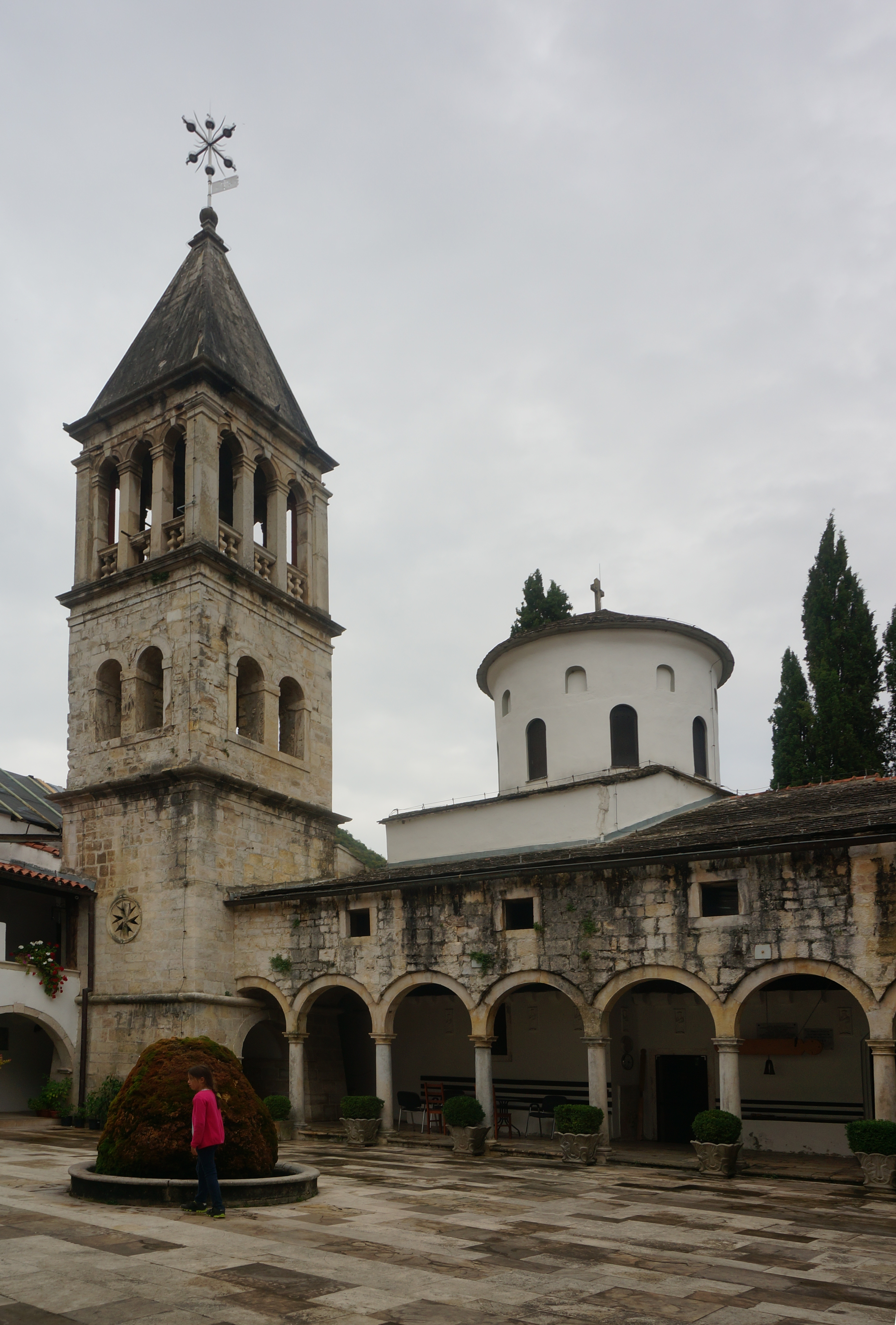
Krka Monastery

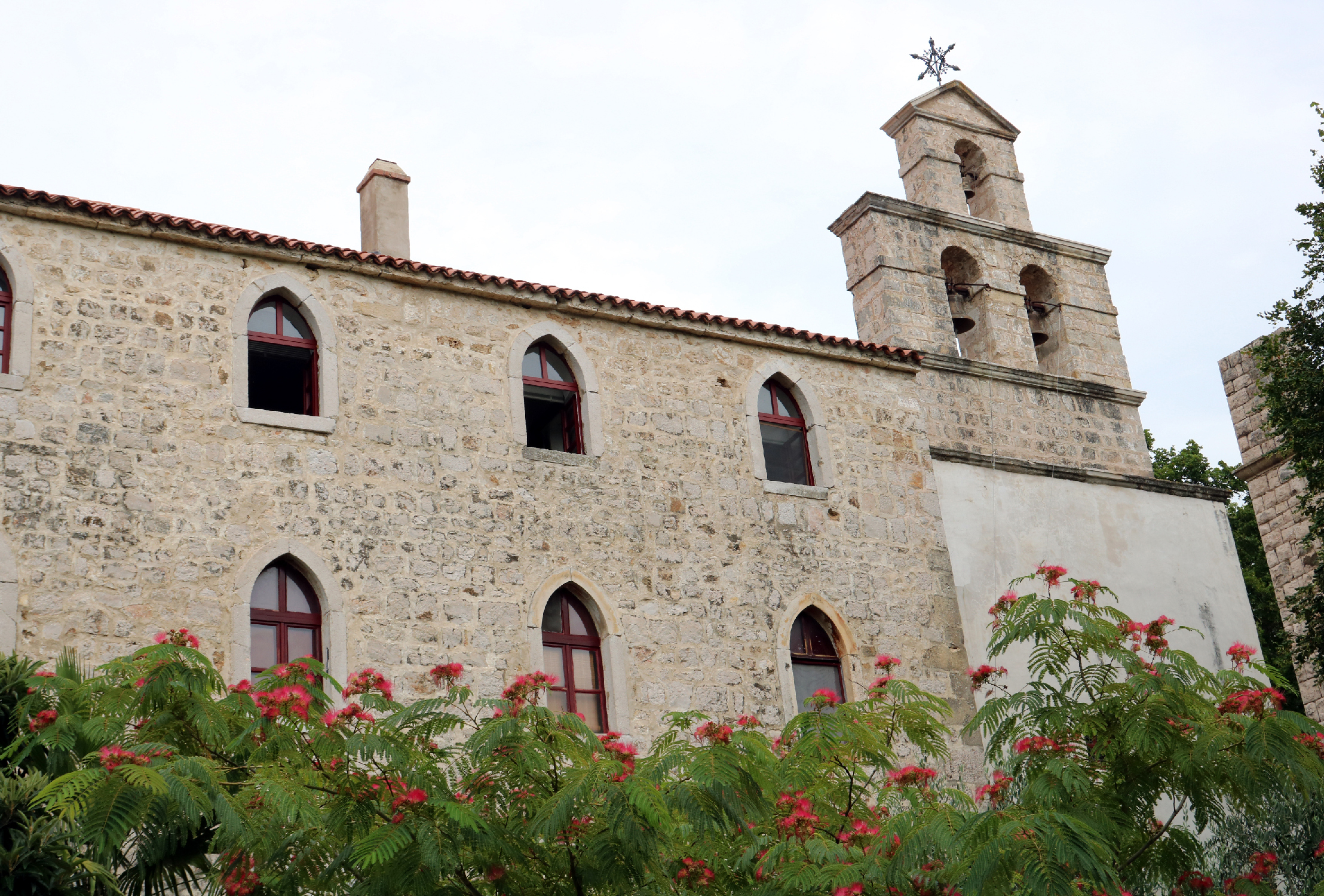
Krupa Monastery

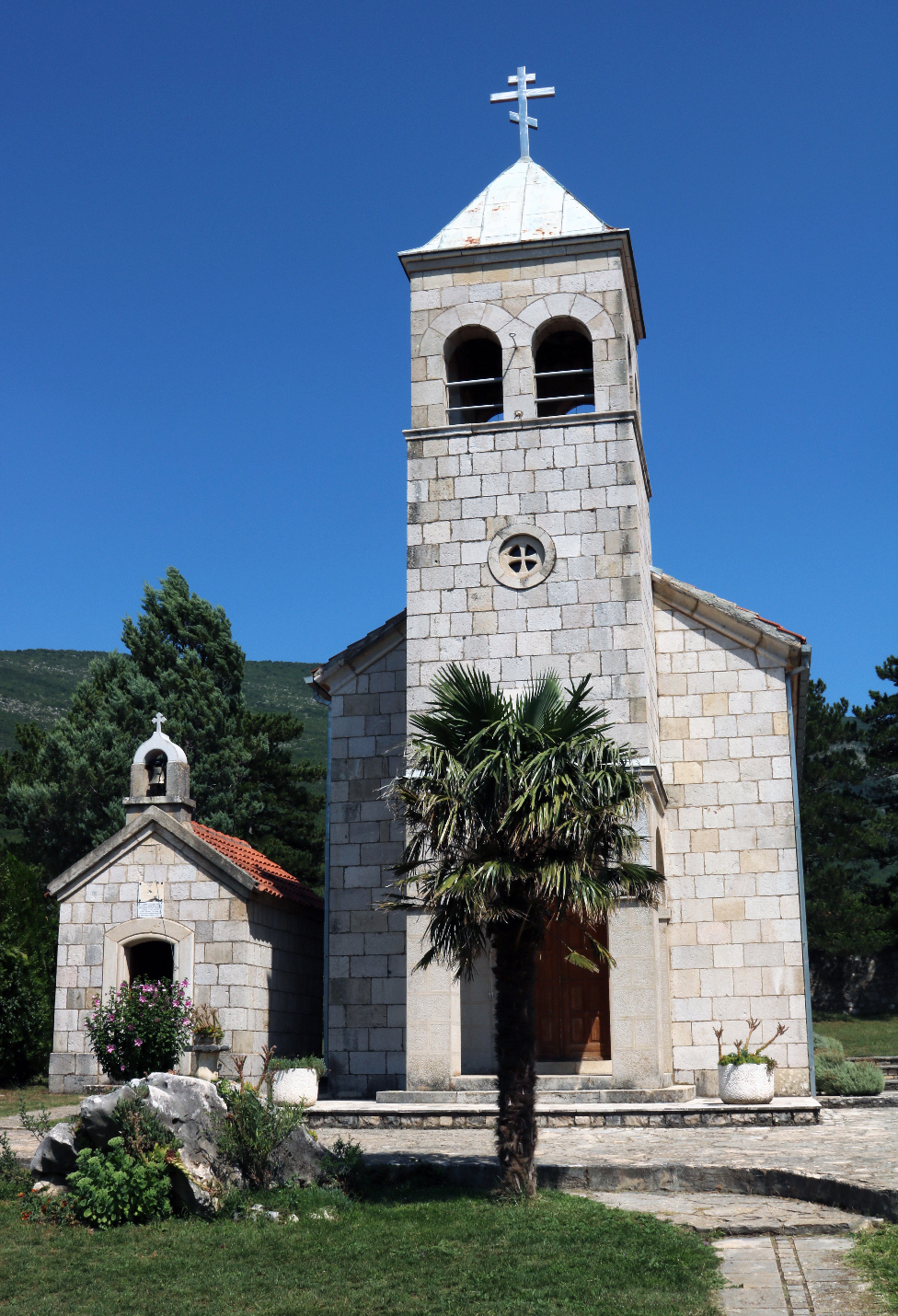
Dragović Monastery

== See also ==
- Eastern Orthodoxy in Croatia
- Eparchies and metropolitanates of the Serbian Orthodox Church
- Serbs of Croatia

== Sources ==
- Bataković, Dušan T., ed. (2005). Histoire du peuple serbe [History of the Serbian People] (in French). Lausanne: L’Age d’Homme.
- Ćirković, Sima (2004). The Serbs. Malden: Blackwell Publishing. ISBN 9781405142915.
- Dabić, Vojin S., ed. (1998). Persecution of Serbs and Ethnic Cleansing in Croatia 1991-1998: Documents and Testimonies. Belgrade: Serbian Council Information Center.
- Fine, John Van Antwerp Jr. (1991) [1983]. The Early Medieval Balkans: A Critical Survey from the Sixth to the Late Twelfth Century. Ann Arbor, Michigan: University of Michigan Press. ISBN 0472081497.
- Fine, John Van Antwerp Jr. (1994) [1987]. The Late Medieval Balkans: A Critical Survey from the Late Twelfth Century to the Ottoman Conquest. Ann Arbor, Michigan: University of Michigan Press. ISBN 0472082604.
- Matić, Marina (2016). "Bishop Savatije Ljubibratić under the auspices of the Republic of Venice (1687-1716)". Istraživanja: Journal of Historical Researches. 27: 106–119.
- Matić, Marina (2020). "Bishop Nikodim Busović and Uniatism in late 17th and early 18th century Dalmatia and Boka". Istraživanja: Journal of Historical Researches. 31 (31): 112–130. doi:10.19090/i.2020.31.112-130. S2CID 228927528.
- Mileusnić, Slobodan (1994). The Monastery of Krka. Belgrade: Museum of the Serbian Orthodox Church.
- Mileusnić, Slobodan (1997). Spiritual Genocide: A survey of destroyed, damaged and desecrated churches, monasteries and other church buildings during the war 1991-1995 (1997). Belgrade: Museum of the Serbian Orthodox Church.
