= Nikodim Busović =

Serbian Orthodox bishop

- Bishop of Dalmatia
- Church: Serbian
- Installed: 24 June 1693
- Predecessor: Vasilije
- Successor: Savatije Ljubibratić

Orders
- Rank: bishop

Personal details
- Born: Busović; 27 December 1657 Sebenico (Šibenik), Venetian Dalmatia (now Croatia)
- Died: 20 December 1707 (aged 49) Krka Monastery, Venetian Dalmatia (now Croatia)
- Denomination: Eastern Orthodox

Nikodim Busović (Serbian Cyrillic: Никодим Бусовић; 1657–1707) was the Serbian Orthodox bishop of Krka (Eparchy of Dalmatia) in 1693–1705, the head of the Serbian Orthodox Church in Dalmatia under Venetian rule.

Born in Sebenico (Šibenik) in Venetian Dalmatia (now in Croatia), Nikodim was the son of Dragosav and Todora. He had a brother, Đurđe, who was baptized in the Orthodox church in Šibenik in 1663. Nikodim was mentioned as a monk at the Krka Monastery already in 1676. He was chirotonized on 24 June 1693 as the bishop of Dalmatia by the Venetian Dalmatian bishop Melentije Tipaldi and a Greek archiereus from Corfu, thus, he was under the jurisdiction of the Philadelphian archbishopric seated in Venice. The Serbian Orthodox leadership criticized him for accepting foreign chirotony, however, in 1696 Arsenije III Čarnojević recognized the chirotony due to Nikodim's resolute defense of Serbian Orthodoxy from Uniatism despite pressure, and improved church life, renovation of the Dragović Monastery (in 1694, deserted in 1614), and other efforts. He was titled the bishop "of all Orthodox Serbs on the Dalmatian continent", and also titled himself as "bishop of Krka". With the arrival of the new provveditore of Dalmatia, Justinio Riva, pressure increased on Nikodim and Orthodox Serbs to subjugate to the Catholic Archdiocese of Split. The pressure led to a Serb rebellion in Dalmatia. Because of this, Nikodim was banished from Dalmatia in early 1705 and forced to take refuge at Mount Athos. In his place, the Venetian government appointed Savatije Ljubibratić, on the demand of the monasteries of Krka and Krupa. When the situation cooled down after a period of time, he returned to Dalmatia and died at the Krka Monastery.

== Sources ==
- Veselinović, Rajko L. (1966). Istorija srpske pravoslavne crkve sa narodnom istorijom. pp. 78, 209. ISBN 9788672950199.
- Radojčić, Jovan S. (2009). Срби западно од Дунава и Дрине: А-З. Прометеј. ISBN 978-86-515-0315-6.

Eastern Orthodox Church titles
Preceded by Vasilije	Head of the Serbian Church in Venetian Dalmatia; 1693–1705	Succeeded by Savatije Ljubibratić
