= Savatije =

Savatije (Serbian Cyrillic: Саватије) is a Serbian masculine given name, a variant of Sabbatius. Notable people with the name include:

- Savatije Ljubibratić (died 1716), bishop of Dalmatian Serbs
- Savatije Sokolović (fl. 1587), Metropolitan of Herzegovina
- Savatije Milošević (died 1905), Chetnik in Macedonia
- Savatije (fl. 1434), Metropolitan of Braničevo
