= Diocese of Zadar =

Diocese of Zadar may refer to:

- Roman Catholic Diocese of Zadar, previous name of the current Roman Catholic Archdiocese of Zadar (Croatia).
- Eastern Orthodox Diocese of Zadar, former common name of the current Serbian Orthodox Eparchy of Dalmatia, during the period when its seat was in the city of Zadar.

== See also ==
- Zadar
- Catholic Church in Croatia
- Eastern Orthodoxy in Croatia
- Diocese of Šibenik (disambiguation)
- Diocese of Zagreb (disambiguation)
- Diocese of Požega (disambiguation)
