= Diocese of Šibenik =

Diocese of Šibenik may refer to:

- Roman Catholic Diocese of Šibenik, a diocese of the Catholic Church in Croatia, with seat in the city of Šibenik.
- Eastern Orthodox Diocese of Šibenik, former common name of the current Serbian Orthodox Eparchy of Dalmatia, during the period when its seat was in the city of Šibenik.

== See also ==
- Šibenik
- Catholic Church in Croatia
- Eastern Orthodoxy in Croatia
- Diocese of Zadar (disambiguation)
- Diocese of Zagreb (disambiguation)
- Diocese of Požega (disambiguation)
