= Jevrosima Laketić =

Serbian philanthropist

Jevrosima Laketić (Serbian Cyrillic: Јевросима Лакетић; Srbina,Herceg Novi, 1760–1847) was a Serbian philanthropist.

Jevrosima Laketić was from the noble Vladisavić family, whose chief representative was Sava Vladislavich. Jevrosima's father was Mato Vlatisavić and her mother was Marija, a cousin of Stevan Ljubibratić. Jevrosima was married to Antonije "Anta" Laketić, a descendant of the Stratimirović. Jevrosima outlived both her husband and children and in her will she bequeathed a portion of her wealth to the poor and the Serbian Orthodox Church, while the largest portion—her estate (house and land) -- was left in a fund from 1858 in Srbina, Herceg Novi dedicated to the Naval Academy, also supported by benefactors Đuro Đurović and Jovan Bošković.
