= Damjan Ljubibratić =

Serbian Orthodox monk and diplomat

- Born: Дамјан Љубибратић
- Other names: Damjan the Serb
- Occupations: Serbian Orthodox monk and diplomat
- Known for: the secretary of Patriarch Jovan Kantul

Damjan Ljubibratić (Serbian Cyrillic: Дамјан Љубибратић), known as Damjan the Serb (Дамјан Србин) was a Serbian Orthodox monk and diplomat, the secretary of Patriarch Jovan Kantul (s. 1592–1614).

== Life ==
=== Origin ===
Ljubibratić hailed from the Trebinje region, and was a descendant of the Ljubibratić noble family. He was a monk of the Patriarchal Monastery of Peć, and became the secretary of Patriarch Jovan Kantul.

He was the top diplomatic agent of the Herzegovina and Peć chieftains, who had put themselves at the leadership of the movement, which would organize the uprisal in Ottoman areas.

=== Serb Uprising of 1596–97 ===
The Orthodox Christians in the Balkans sought the right moment to revolt against the Ottomans. Serbian, Greek, Bulgarian and Albanian monks visited European courts for help. The Banat Uprising (1594) had been aided by Serbian Orthodox metropolitans Rufim Njeguš of Cetinje and Visarion of Trebinje (s. 1590–1602). In 1596 revolts spread into Ottoman Montenegro and the neighbouring tribes in Herzegovina, especially under influence of Metropolitan Visarion. Visarion and the chieftains in Herzegovina asked the Pope for help. A Ragusan document from the beginning of 1596 claims that many Herzegovinian chieftains with the metropolitan gathered in the Trebinje Monastery where they swore oath "to give up and donate 20,000 heroes to the emperors' light." Grdan and the rebels were defeated on the Gacko Field sometime in 1597. The rebels then made peace with the Ottomans, and Grdan was forgiven by Ahmed Pasha Khadum. However, Grdan and Patriarch Jovan would continue to plan revolts against the Ottomans in the coming years.

=== 1599 ===
In April 1599, Damjan again gave the pope a letter from Patriarch Jovan Kantul.

=== 1604–05 ===
In 1604, Damjan enumerated these regions that were ready for uprisal: Dračevica, Zupci, Riđani, Nikšići, Banjani, Piva, Drobnjaci, Morača, Trebinje, Rudine, Gacko, Plana, Kolašin, Vraneš, Mileševo, Sjenica, Novi ...

In 1605, he went on a diplomatic mission to the Republic of Ragusa, discussing the redemption of some slaves from Senj.
