= Diocese of Zagreb =

Diocese of Zagreb may refer to:

- Roman Catholic Diocese of Zagreb, central archdiocese of the Catholic Church in Croatia
- Serbian Orthodox Diocese of Zagreb, Eastern Orthodox diocese

== See also ==
- Catholic Church in Croatia
- Eastern Orthodoxy in Croatia
- Diocese of Požega (disambiguation)
- Diocese of Zadar (disambiguation)
- Diocese of Šibenik (disambiguation)
