= Diocese of Požega =

Diocese of Požega may refer to:

- Serbian Orthodox Diocese of Požega, former diocese (eparchy) of the Serbian Orthodox Church, in Slavonia (Croatia).
- Roman Catholic Diocese of Požega, current diocese of the Catholic Church, in central Slavonia (Croatia).

== See also ==
- Požega
- Eastern Orthodoxy in Croatia
- Catholic Church in Croatia
- Diocese of Zagreb (disambiguation)
- Diocese of Zadar (disambiguation)
- Diocese of Šibenik (disambiguation)
