= Vranješ =

Vranješ may refer to:

- Jurica Vranješ (born 1980), Croatian footballer
- Ljubomir Vranjes (born 1973), Swedish handball player of Serbian origin
- Mićo Vranješ (born 1975), Serbian footballer
- Ognjen Vranješ (born 1989), Bosnian footballer
- Stjepan Vranješ (born 1971), Croatian footballer
- Stojan Vranješ (born 1986), Bosnian footballer
- Vladimir Vranješ (born 1988), Bosnian handball player

== See also ==
- Vraneš
