= Dimitrije Ruvarac =

Serbian historian, priest and academic

Dimitrije "Mita" Ruvarac
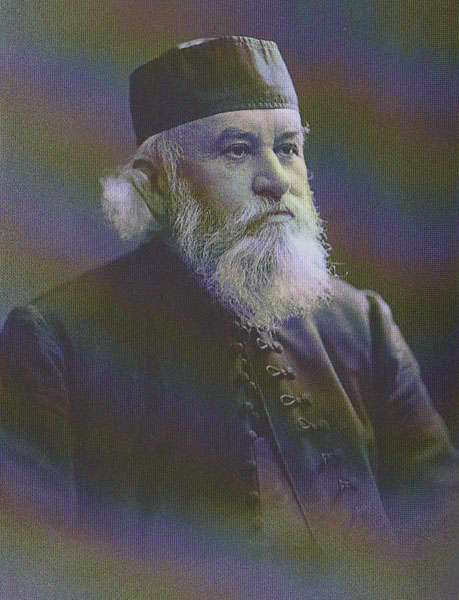
- Born: Dimitrije Ruvarac; October 25, 1842; Stari Banovci, Austria Hungary
- Died: December 16, 1931 (aged 89); Sremski Karlovci, Kingdom of Yugoslavia
- Other names: Mita
- Occupations: historian, publisher and priest
- Known for: one of the most active publishers of his time

Dimitrije "Mita" Ruvarac (Serbian: Димитрије Руварац; Stari Banovci, Austria Hungary October 25, 1842 – Sremski Karlovci, Kingdom of Yugoslavia December 16, 1931) was a Serbian historian, Orthodox priest, academic and publisher. He is known for being one of the most active publishers of his time.

== Biography ==
Ruvarac's family immigrated to Syrmia in Austria-Hungary, today in Serbia, from the region between Bihać and Cazin, nowadays Bosnia and Herzegovina, then Ottoman Empire.

German historian Leopold von Ranke was among the scholars who influenced Dimitrije Ruvarac the most.

He possessed a rich library with several hundred rare or unique books and documents. Ruvarac was corresponding with a number of notable academics, including Nikodim Milaš.

== Selected works ==
- Pozivi I Odzivi Ili Radnja Pojedinih Srpskih Arhiepiskopa U Mitropoliji Karlovackoj, Oko Podizanja Srpskih Škola I Stvaranja Fondova za njihovo izdržavanje, (1894) Zemun, Štamparija Jove Karamata
- Životopis Dorda Nikolajevića mitropolita Dabro-Bosanskog. Štamp. J. Karamata. 1898.
- "Jezičko i etničko razgraničenje Srba i Hrvata (Linguistic and ethnic border of Serbs and Croats)", Evo šta ste nam krivi (This is what we blame you for) (in Serbian), 1895, archived from the original on July 17, 2011
- Postanak i razvitak srpske crkvenonarodne avtonomije (1899)
- Srpska Mitropolija Karlovačka oko polovine XVIII veka (1902)
- Opis Srpskih Fruškogorskih Manastira 1753 God., (1903), Sremski Karlovci
- Istorija Patrijaršijske biblioteke (1919)
- Nacrt života i spisak književnih radova mitropolita Stratimirovića (1921)
