= Savatije Ljubibratić =

Serbian Orthodox bishop

Metropolitan Savatije Ljubibratić
- Metropolitan of Zahumlje and Dalmatia
- Metropolis: Metropolitanate of Zahumlje

Personal details
- Born: Unknown Piva, Ottoman Empire
- Died: January 1716 Topla, near Herceg Novi
- Denomination: Serbian Orthodox
- Residence: Tvrdoš (until 1690)

Savatije Ljubibratić (Serbian Cyrillic: Саватије Љубибратић; fl. c. 1660—January, 1716) was a Serbian Orthodox bishop and metropolitan, and the caretaker of the Dragović monastery.

== Early life ==
Ljubibratić was born in Piva, and belonged to the Ruđić brotherhood, at a time when the region was part of the Ottoman Empire. Ljubibratić, as many of his relatives, took monastic vows and later became a bishop.

== Bishop of Herzegovina ==
Since 1687, he was a notable participant in the struggle against the Ottomans, in Venetian support. On 10 December 1687, he was present at Tvrdoš when the priest and vojvoda Vukašin Gavrilović with his people came from Nikšić. In 1690, he and the Tvrdoš brotherhood (including his brother Stevan) left Trebinje for Herceg Novi, fleeing the Ottomans, where they renovated the Savina Monastery.

The Republic of Venice recognized Savatije's episcopal rule as Metropolitan (Vladika) of Zahumlje in Novi in 1695. His ecclesiastical province stretched over "newly conquered areas". The Serbian Church made the first steps to establish an independent Serb municipality in the region of old Dračevica.

== Bishop of Dalmatia ==
Metropolitan Nikodim Busović, the bishop "of all Orthodox Serbs on the Dalmatian continent", was banished from Dalmatia in early 1705. On the demand of the Krka monastery and Krupa monastery, Ljubibratić was appointed Nikodim's office by the Venetian government. Ljubibratić had taken this office in spite of Melentije Tipaldi (1658–1730), the Greek-Catholic bishop who was a driving force of Uniatism, and continued the struggle against the Uniatism of Serbs in Dalmatia. Tipaldi greatly undermined against Ljubibratić, so far that the Church Synod in Constantinople condemned Tipaldi and excluded him from the Orthodox Church as a traitor; with this support, Ljubibratić was able to continue his service.

In July 1705 Metropolitan Savatije Ljubibratić came back from the pilgrimage from Palestine and from the time his vessel entered the quarantine station called lazaretto, he was subjected to the sanitary procedure by the staff of lazaretto in Herceg Novi as every other traveller aboard. After a lapse of 15 days, he was released. There he proceeded to build a bridge, churches and restore others. Savatije is credited for restoring Savina Monastery, Montenegro.

Savatije and his brother Stevan became friends with colonel Mihailo Miloradović, who had along with Metropolitan Danilo I Petrović-Njegoš been recruited by Peter I of Russia to incite rebellion in Herzegovina against the Ottomans in 1710–11 (during the Pruth River Campaign).

Ljubibratić successfully opposed the orders of the Catholic curia against the Orthodox believers in Dalmatia. Savatije declined Venetian official Ivan Burović's offers to begin Uniatism, Burović having sent the Catholic bishop of Kotor and his relative Vićentije Zmajević from Perast. He strengthened ties with the Serbian Patriarchate of Peć, and as a result of that, Serbian Patriarch Mojsije I visited Dalmatia in 1714, after Ljubibratić's request; this visit proved important for the preservation of Orthodoxy and somewhat paused pressure on the Orthodox church in Dalmatia. Savatije Ljubibratić died in January 1716, in the village of Topla near Herceg Novi.

His successor was his brother Stevan Ljubibratić.

== Legacy ==
He was one of the more successful Serb national leaders of the 18th century.

Eastern Orthodox Church titles
Preceded by	Metropolitan of Herzegovina ?–1690	Succeeded by
Preceded by Simeon	Metropolitan of Zahumlje; 1693–1716	Succeeded by Gerasim
Preceded by Nikodim Busović	Head of Serbian Church in Dalmatia; 1705–1716	Succeeded by Stevan Ljubibratić

== See also ==
- Ljubibratić
- Nikodim Busović

== Sources ==
- Komar, Goran (2001). "Светоуспенски манастир Савина у Мељинама код Херцег-Новог". Savina; Rastko.
- Komar, Goran (1997). "Планинска села Драчевице под влашћу Венеције 1687-1797". Kosmos; Rastko.
  - О вјерском животу и стању Цркве
- Komar, Goran (2010). "Митрополити Саватије и Стефан Љубибратић". Svetigora.
- Matić, Marina (2016). "BISHOP SAVATIJE LJUBIBRATIĆ UNDER THE AUSPICES OF THE REPUBLIC OF VENICE (1687-1716)". Istraživanja. 27: 106–119.
- Mihić, Ljubo (1975). Ljubinje sa okolinom. Dragan Srnic.
- Veselinović, Rajko L. (1966). Istorija srpske pravoslavne crkve sa narodnom istorijom. pp. 78, 209.
