= Cathedral of the Dormition of the Theotokos, Šibenik =

Serbian Orthodox cathedral in Šibenik, Croatia

Cathedral of the Dormition of the Theotokos
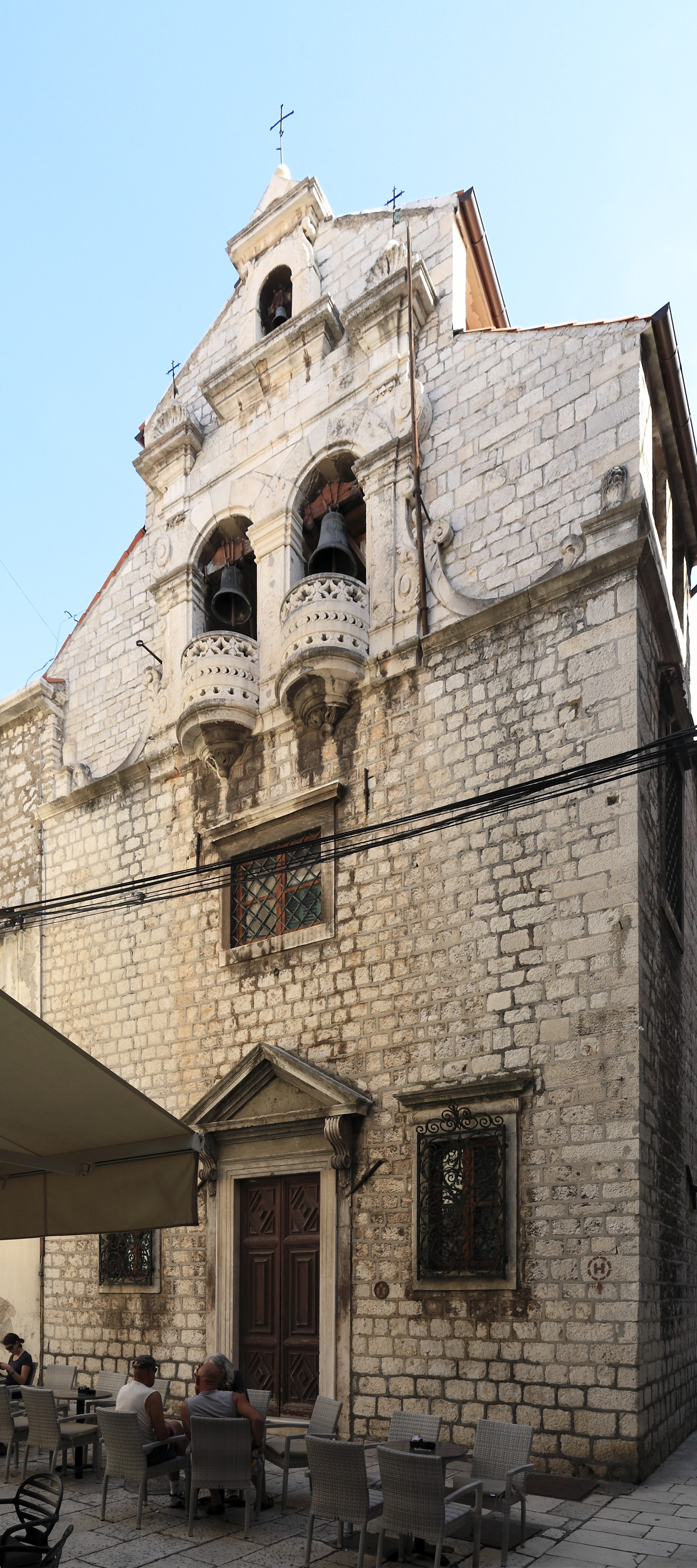
- Cathedral of the Dormition of the Theotokos, pictured in 2012
- Cathedral of the Dormition of the Theotokos
- 43°44′06″N 15°53′32″E
- Location: Šibenik
- Country: Croatia
- Denomination: Serbian Orthodox Church

History
- Dedication: Dormition of the Theotokos

Administration
- Archdiocese: Eparchy of Dalmatia

The Cathedral of the Dormition of the Theotokos (Serbian: Саборна црква Успења Пресвете Богородице; Croatian: Saborna crkva Uspenja Presvete Bogorodice) is an Eastern Orthodox church located in Šibenik, Croatia. It is under jurisdiction of the Eparchy of Dalmatia of the Serbian Orthodox Church and serves as its cathedral church.

The church is a baroque building dating from the 17th to 18th centuries, originally built on a site inhabited by the Templars in the 12th century. Initially, it served as the Roman Catholic Church of St. Saviour, part of a Benedictine nunnery, until 1810 when Napoleon ruled Illyrian Provinces transferred it to the Serbian Orthodox Eparchy of Dalmatia under bishop Benedikt Kraljević.

The church is home to a notable collection of cultural, historical, and artistic artifacts, featuring Italo-Cretan icons, other religious items, and an extensive library. Its facade is decorated by a Baroque bell tower, designed by the local master Ivan Skoko in the early 18th century.

== History ==
In the 16th century, Orthodox Greeks and Serbs in Šibenik shared the Church of St. Julian. By 1600, the Orthodox Serbs built a church dedicated to the Holy Cross, and in 1778, they relocated their services to the newly constructed Church of St. Spas, which is still in use today. During the French rule in Dalmatia in 1810, the Orthodox community also established the Cathedral of the Dormition of the Theotokos in the city center.

== See also ==
- List of Serbian Orthodox churches in Croatia
- Serbs of Croatia
