= Vraneš =

Vraneš (Serbian Cyrillic: Bpaнeш) is a surname. Notable people with the surname include:

- Biljana Vraneš (born 1999), Montenegrin footballer
- Danny Vranes (born 1958), American basketball player
- Ljubica Vraneš (born 1979), Serbian opera singer and politician
- Miloš Vraneš (born 1995), Serbian basketball player
- Slaviša Vraneš (born 1977), Serbian sprinter
- Slavko Vraneš (born 1983), Montenegrin basketball player
- Zoran Vraneš (born 1950), Serbian football player and coach

== See also ==
- Lower Kolašin
- Vranješ
- Vranešić
