= Jeronim Ljubibratić =

Ragusan military officer

Baron Jeronim Ljubibratić von Trebinje (1736)
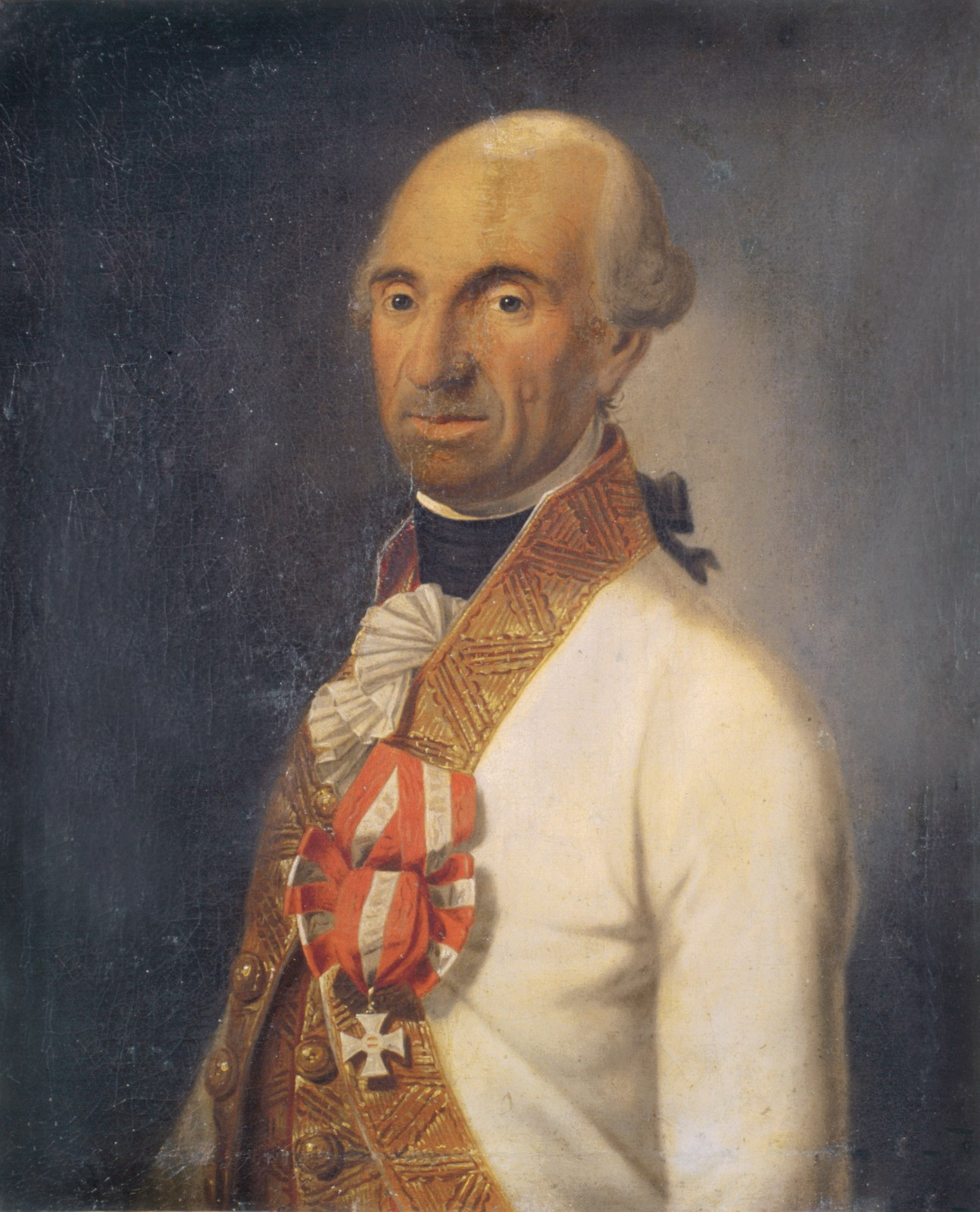
- Born: 1716; Dubrovnik, Republic of Ragusa, modern-day Croatia
- Died: 1 November 1779 (aged 62–63); Vienna, Archduchy of Austria
- Other names: Jероним Љубибратић; Hieronimus Liubibratich
- Military career
- Rank: Feldmarschall
- Nicknames: "Jero"; "Jefto"

Jeronim Ljubibratić (Note: Serbian Cyrillic: Jероним Љубибратић) (1716 – 1 November 1779), was a Ragusan military officer who served the Habsburg monarchy.

== Life ==
Ljubibratić, an ethnic Serb, came from Trebinje, at the time part of the Ottoman Empire (modern Bosnia and Herzegovina). His clan, the Ljubibratići, claimed descent from the medieval Ljubibratić noble family.

In 1730, at the age of 14, he entered as a cadet the regiment of Grenzers, an elite regiment of Hussars. In 1753, he reached the rank of Oberstlieutenant. In 1758, he was an Oberst, in charge of the 8th regiment of Grenz, with several military campaign successes under his belt. He had already received the title of Freiherrnstand-Baron in 1760. In 1762, he was awarded the Maria-Theresa order. In 1770, he was promoted to general-major and finally, in 1773, to Feldmarschall-Lieutenant (field marshal-lieutenant). He died in Vienna.

== See also ==
- List of notable Ragusans
