= Simeon Končarević =

Serbian Orthodox bishop

- Born: 1690; Gornji Karin, Kingdom of Dalmatia, Austrian Empire
- Died: 26 August 1769 (aged 78–79); Kyiv, Grand Duchy of Lithuania
- Occupation: Bishop

Simeon Končarević (Serbian Cyrillic: Симеон Кончаревић; about 1690 – 26 August 1769) was a Serbian Orthodox bishop in Venetian Dalmatia, serving from 1751 to 1757, before emigrating from Dalmatia to Imperial Russia. Končarević is presumed to be the author of a lost chronicle that was allegedly preserved and used in the work Orthodox Dalmatia (1901) by Nikodim Milaš.

== Biography ==
Simeon was born in Gornji Karin near Obrovac, Croatia. He was educated in Zadar, and Venice.

He was appointed the parish priest of Benkovac in 1720 by Stevan Ljubibratić, the Serbian Orthodox bishop of Dalmatia (1716–20). In Venetian Dalmatia, the Serbian clergy were forced to recognize the local Catholic bishop as their superiors. After he led resistance to the canonical campaign of the Italian Catholic Bishop of Nin, Ivan Andrija Balbi, Končarević was briefly imprisoned in 1728.

After his release, he convoked an assembly of priests on 16 June 1731, whereby the Serbian Orthodox priesthood adopted not to recognize the authority of the Catholic bishops, condemned their demands to carry out campaigns against Orthodox churches, and sent a request to the Venetian regions for the appointment of an Orthodox bishop for Dalmatia and the Bay of Kotor. At a gathering of clergy in Kosovo near Knin in 1750, he was nominated as a bishop, and ordained in 1751 with jurisdiction in Dalmatia and Kotor.

Končarević was expelled from Dalmatia two years later. He took refuge in the village of Popina, from where he governed his diocese for another four years. The dissatisfied Serb population began to migrate to the neighboring territory of the Habsburg Empire. Such political unrest and the danger from the Uniates movement caused the departure of hundreds of people from North Dalmatia, under the leadership of Bishop Končarević, to Russia as well. Returning in 1760, he learned that he had been declared a traitor for urging emigration, so he stayed in Buda and Vienna, where, through the mediation of the Russian embassy, he handed over to the Venetian side a memorandum demanding freedom of religion for the Orthodoxs in Dalmatia.

In 1762, he returned to Lika, but was imprisoned by the Habsburgs and then expelled to Russia, after learning that he organized priests and prepared people for a new migration. He spent the rest of his life in the Peter and Paul Monastery in Kiev, collecting and sending church books to Serbian monasteries. There, he supposedly wrote his Chronicle of Civil and Church Events. He died on 26 August 1769.

== Chronicle ==
The location and existence of his chronicle is a matter of debate. In 1869, Šime Ljubić recorded the existence of some of Končarević's writings, but not by Božidar Petranović or his brother Gerasim Petranović.

In 1897, Nikodim Milaš announced that he found Končarević's chronicle, that it was given to him in Vienna by a Russian ambassador and that he returned it after making a transcript, giving it the provisional title "Chronicle of civil and church events". It reportedly was used as the basis for Milaš's Pravoslavna Dalmacija (1901, "Orthodox Dalmatia") in which various controversial inaccuracies were claimed about the history of Dalmatia and Serbian Orthodoxy in the region. Milaš claimed that he possessed the chronicle (or transcript), although it was not subsequently found in the family's or the SANU's library.

Milenko Pekić doubts the actual existence of Končarević's writing of the chronicle, considering it a forgery. Tibor Živković concluded that "this work, with the exception of Milaš, has never been available to researchers, and the structure of the news raises doubts about their authenticity". Mile Bogović noted that nobody saw it except Milaš and that it "seems like it never existed", while Stjepan Antoljak presumed it is not lost and needs to be found in the Russian State Library.

== See also ==
- Visarion Pavlović
- Zaharije Orfelin
- Jovan Rajić
- Mojsije Putnik
- Savatije Ljubibratić
- Stevan Ljubibratić
