= Church of the Intercession of the Theotokos, Knin =

Serbian Orthodox church in Knin, Croatia

Coordinates: 44.03397°N 16.196572°E

Church of the Intercession of the Theotokos
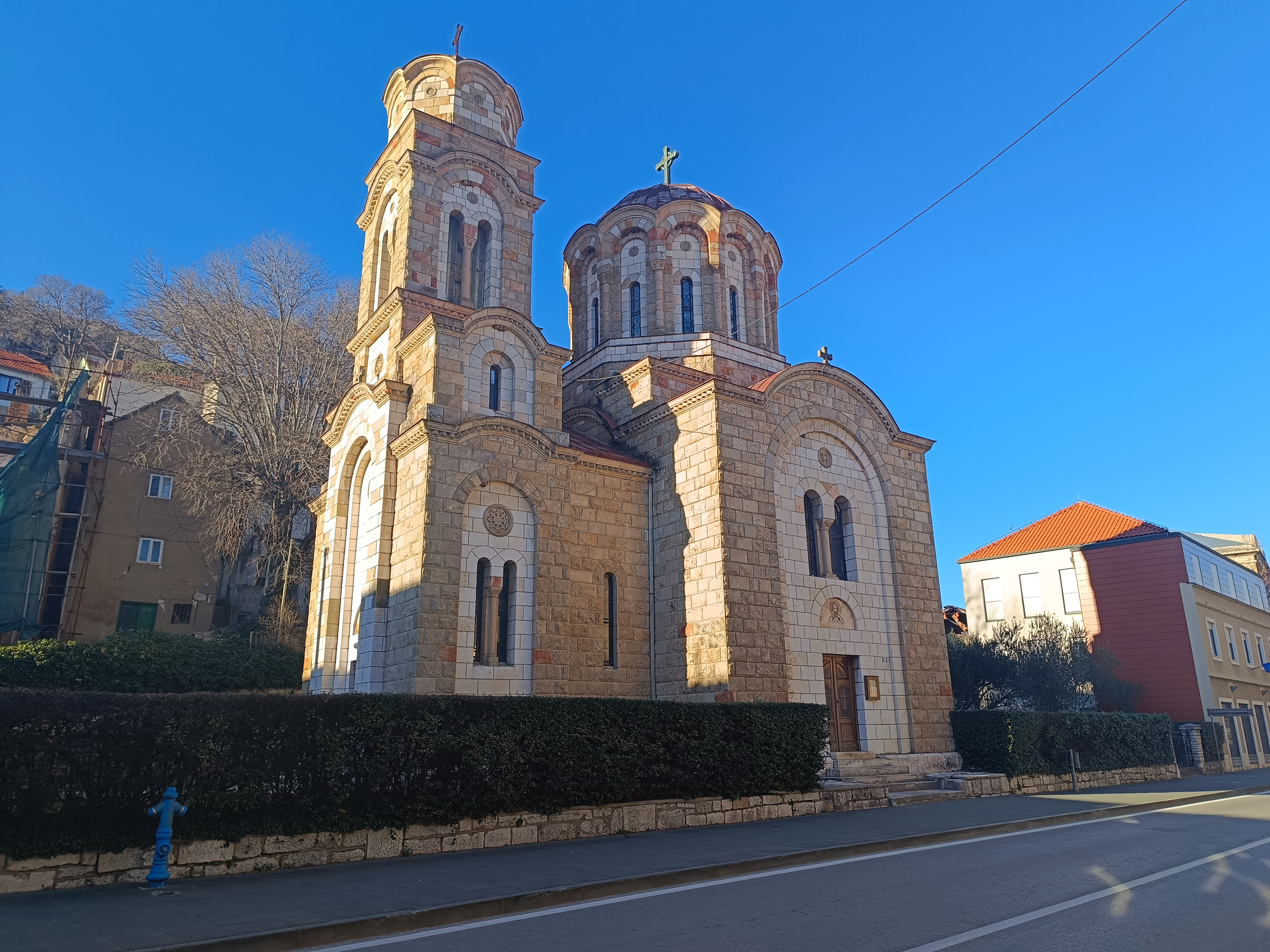
- Church of the Intercession of the Theotokos
- Location: Knin
- Country: Croatia
- Denomination: Serbian Orthodox Church

Architecture
- Completed: 1971

The Church of the Intercession of the Theotokos (Serbian: Храм покрова пресвете Богородице, romanized: Hram pokrova presvete Bogorodice) is a Serbian Orthodox Church in Knin, Croatia, dedicated to the Intercession of the Theotokos. The church was built in the neo-Byzantine style in the 18th century.

== See also ==
- List of Serbian Orthodox churches in Croatia
