= Meletius Tipaldi =

Bishop

- Archbishop of Philadelphia
- Church: Ecumenical Patriarchate of Constantinople (until 1690); Roman Catholic Church (since 1690)
- Elected: by 1685 (Orthodox); 1690 (Catholic)
- In office: 1685–90 (Orthodox); 1690–1713 (Catholic)

Personal details
- Born: 17th century
- Died: 13 May 1713 Republic of Venice

Meletius Tipaldi (Italian: Meletio Tipaldi, Serbo-Croatian: Melentije/Meletije Tipaldi, Serbian Cyrillic: Мелентије Типалди; fl. 1685–13 May 1713) was a bishop in Venetian Dalmatia. He moved from the Orthodox to the Roman Catholic Church.

== Church career ==
Until 1690, Tipaldi served the Ecumenical Patriarchate of Constantinople. On 13 September in that year he called on Orthodox Christians to subjugate to Rome, and thenceforward he embraced Eastern Catholicism and officiated within the Roman Catholic Church.

As the Archbishop of Philadelphia (now in Turkey) under the Patriarchate of Constantinople, he was the head of the Orthodox Christian population in Venetian territory, thus was recognized as the head of Orthodox Serbs in Dalmatia. The Catholic Church and Venetian government had pressured him to accept Uniatism. In order to ease the Uniatism of Orthodox Dalmatians, Tipaldi met with Nikodim Busović, a monk at the Krka Monastery, and had him appointed the bishop of Dalmatia in 1693. Nikodim would however resist Uniatism and be recognized as a Serbian Orthodox exarch. Tipaldi was excluded from the Orthodox church in 1712.
