= Stevan Ljubibratić =

Serbian Orthodox bishop

Stevan Ljubibratić also spelled Stefan Ljubibratić (Serbian Cyrillic: Стеван/Стефан Љубибратић; c. 1661 – 1737) was a Serbian Orthodox bishop of Dalmatia. He was the brother to Bishop Savatije Ljubibratić of Dalmatia.

== Early life ==
Ljubibratić brothers were born in Piva and belonged to the Ruđić brotherhood, at a time when the region was part of the Ottoman Empire. Ljubibratić, as many of his relatives, took monastic vows and later became a bishop.

Since 1687, Stevan and Savatije Ljubibratić were notable participants in the struggle against the Ottomans, in Venetian support. On 10 December 1687, both Stevan and Savatija were present at Tvrdoš when priest and vojvoda Vukašin Gavrilović with his people came from Nikšić. In 1690, he and the Tvrdoš brotherhood (including his brother Savatije) left Trebinje for Herceg Novi, fleeing the Ottomans, where they renovated the Savina Monastery.

The Republic of Venice recognized Savatije's episcopal rule as Metropolitan (vladika) of Zahumlje in Novi in 1695. His ecclesiastical province stretched over "newly conquered areas". The Serbian Church made the first steps to establish an independent Serb municipality in the region of old Dračevica.

== Bishop of Dalmatia ==
Metropolitan Nikodim Busović, the bishop "of all Orthodox Serbs on the Dalmatian continent", was banished from Dalmatia in 1705. On the demand of the Krka monastery and Krupa monastery, Stevan Ljubibratić's brother Savatije was appointed Nikodim's office by the Venetian government. Ljubibratić had taken this office in spite of Melentije Tipaldi (1658–1730), the Greek-Catholic bishop who was a driving force of Uniatism, and continued the struggle against the Uniatism of Serbs in Dalmatia. Tipaldi greatly undermined against Ljubibratić, so far that the Church Synod in Constantinople condemned Tipaldi and excluded him from the Orthodox Church as a traitor; with this support, Savatije Ljubibratić was able to continue his service.

Stevan and Savatije became friends with colonel Mihailo Miloradović, who had along with Metropolitan Danilo I Petrović-Njegoš been recruited by Peter I of Russia to incite rebellion in Herzegovina against the Ottomans in 1710–11 (during the Pruth River Campaign).

Savatije Ljubibratić successfully opposed the orders of the Catholic curia against the Orthodox believers in Dalmatia. Savatije declined Venetian official Ivan Burović's offers to begin Uniatism, Burović having sent the Catholic bishop of Kotor and his relative Vićentije Zmajević from Perast. He strengthened ties with the Serbian Patriarchate of Peć, whose Patriarch, Mojsije Rajović, visited Dalmatia in 1714, after Ljubibratić's request; this visit proved important for the preservation of Orthodoxy and somewhat paused pressure on the Orthodox church in Dalmatia. After the death of Savatije Ljubibratić in January 1716, in the village of Topla, near Herceg Novi, Stevan was chosen to take his brother's throne.

On 2 September 1719 Cardinal Fabrizio Paolucci asked Rome that the Nuncio in Venice bar Bishop Stevan Ljubibratić from visiting the Serbian Orthodox population on Venetian territory. On 25 January 1720, responding to the demand by Cardinal Paulucci, the Venetian Government ordered the Providur of Dalmatia to expel Bishop Ljubibratić from Dalmatia.

Following his banishment from Dalmatia, Bishop Ljubibratić went to the Serbian Orthodox Ličko-Krbavska and Zrinopoljska Eparchy which was established in 1695 by metropolitan Atanasije Ljubojević and certified by Emperor Joseph I in 1707. This eparchy was the ecclesiastical centre of the Serbian Orthodox Church in this region, populated by Serbs, the community known at the time as "Rascians". This eparchy was under the jurisdiction of the Metropolitan of Dabro-Bosna, directly under the restored Serbian Patriarch in Peć. In Kostajnica, on 1 February 1728, Stevan was made Bishop of Licko-Krbavka and Zrinopoljska Eparchy. His contact with his beloved Dalmatia was Simeon Končarević who became one of the most important figures in 18th-century Serbian history.

He died in April 1737.
