= Simo Matavulj =

Serbian writer and translator

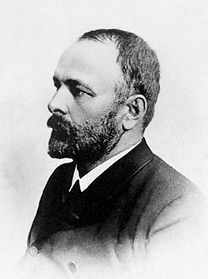
- Born: 12 September 1852; Šibenik, Kingdom of Dalmatia, Austrian Empire
- Died: 20 February 1908 (aged 55); Belgrade, Kingdom of Serbia
- Occupation: Novelist
- Writing career
- Language: Serbian
- Period: Realism
- Genre: Satire
- Subject: Dalmatian people
- Notable works: Bakonja fra-Brne; Pilipenda; Bilješke Jednog Pisca

Simo Matavulj (Serbian: Симо Матавуљ; 12 September 1852 – 20 February 1908) was a Serbian writer and translator.

== Biography ==
After finishing elementary school in Italian and Serbian in his hometown of Šibenik, he continued his secondary education in Krupa Monastery and Teacher's College in Zadar from which he graduated in 1871. After graduation, he went to Islam Grčki, where he served as secretary to Count Ilija Janković, the last descendant of Stojan Janković. In 1881, he started working as a teacher in Montenegro, where he met Pavel Rovinsky. A year later, he used an opportunity presented by the government to escort several students from prominent Montenegrin families to schools in Milan and Paris, where he met Anatole France among other writers. He moved to Serbia in 1887 and worked as a teacher in Zaječar.

He was a representative of lyric realism, especially in short prose. As a writer, he is best known for employing his skill in holding up to ridicule the peculiar foibles of the Dalmatian folk.

Matavulj was an honorary member of the Matica srpska of Novi Sad, the first president of the Association of Writers of Serbia, president of the Society of Artists of Serbia and a member of the Serbian Royal Academy.

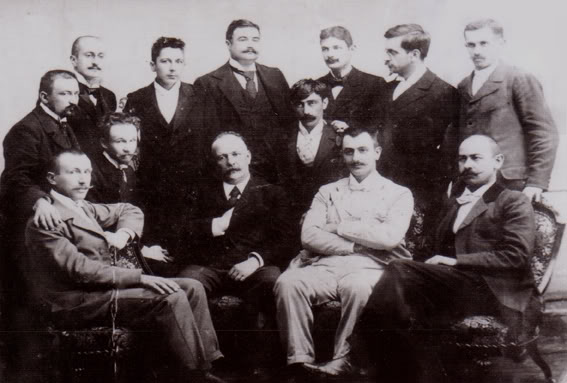
Serbian poetic circle.

== Legacy ==
Yugoslav writer Ivo Andrić, who won the Nobel Prize in Literature in 1961, called him "the master storyteller".

== Works ==
- Noć uoči Ivanje, Zadar, 1873.
- Naši prosjaci, Zadar, 1881.
- Iz Crne Gore i Primorja I, Novi Sad, 1888.
- Iz Crne Gore i Primorja II, Cetinje, 1889.
- Novo oružje, Belgrade, 1890.
- Iz prіmorskog žіvota, Zagreb, 1890.
- Sa Jadrana, Belgrade, 1891.
- Iz beogradskog života, Belgrade, 1891.
- Bakonja fra-Brne, Belgrade, 1892.
- Uskok, Belgrade, 1893.
- Iz raznijeh krajeva, Mostar, 1893.
- Boka i Bokelji, Novi Sad, 1893.
- Primorska obličja, Novi Sad, 1899.
- Deset godina u Mavritaniji, Belgrade, 1899.
- Tri pripovetke, Mostar, 1899.
- Na pragu drugog života, Sremski Karlovci, 1899.
- S mora i planine, Novi Sad, 1901.
- Beogradske priče, Belgrade, 1902.
- Pošljednji vitezovi i Svrzimantija, Mostar, 1903.
- Život, Belgrade 1904.
- Na slavi, Belgrade, 1904.
- Zavjet, Belgrade, 1904.
- Car Duklijan, Mostar, 1906.
- Nemirne duše, Belgrade, 1908.
- Bilješke jednoga pisca, Belgrade, 1923.
- Golub Dobrašinović

=== Translations ===
- Na vodi by Guy de Maupassant, 1893.
- Vilina knjiga, a collection of fairy tales, 1894.
- Bleak House by Charles Dickens 1893.
- Zimske priče by M. de Vogie, 1894.
- The dream by Émile Zola
- Pučanin kao vlastelin by Moliere, 1906.
- The Misanthrope by Moliere,
- The Imitation of Christ by Thomas à Kempis, unpublished during Matavulj's lifetime

== Sources ==
- Translated and adapted from Jovan Skerlić's Istorija nove srpske književnosti / History of New Serbian Literature (Belgrade, 1921), pp. 390–395.
