= Dragović monastery =

Serbian Orthodox monastery near Vrlika, Croatia

Coordinates: 43.8639°N 16.5114°E

- Манастир Драговић; Manastir Dragović
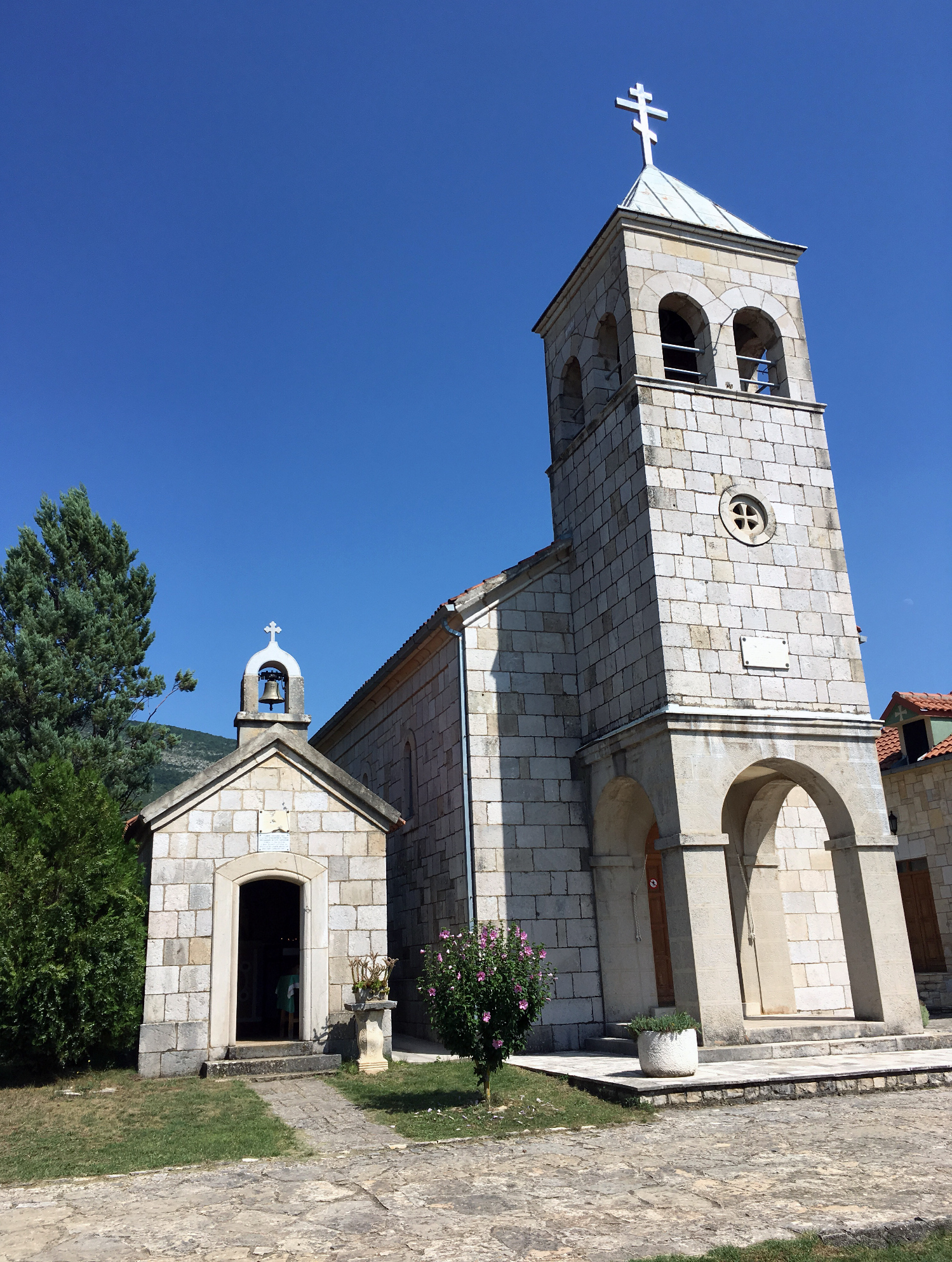
- Dragović monastery
- Interactive map of Dragović monastery

Monastery information
- Order: Serbian Orthodox
- Established: between 16th-17th century

Site
- Location: Koljane near Vrlika, Croatia
- Visible remains: Saint Grigorije Nemanjić relics
- Public access: Yes

The Dragović monastery (Serbian: Манастир Драговић, Manastir Dragović) is a Serbian Orthodox monastery situated on a hill downstream the Cetina River, not far from Vrlika in Croatia. When the artificial Peruća Lake was created, the original monastery sank due to land movement. The new monastery was built on a hill not far from the previous one and is now located next to Lake Peruća, 20 kilometers from Knin.

During its history, the Dragović monastery was destroyed three times. Today, it belongs to the Eparchy of Dalmatia of the Serbian Orthodox Church, and as such is one of the three spiritual centers of the Serbs of Dalmatia, alongside the Krka monastery and the Krupa monastery.

According to the chronicle "History of the Holy Nativity Monastery Dragović in the Orthodox Diocese of Dalmatia", written by the archimandrite Gerasim Petranović in 1859, the monastery was named after Drago, who moved with his brothers from Bosnia to the Cetina region. However, according to local folk stories, the monastery owes its name to the river that flowed near its former location.

== History ==
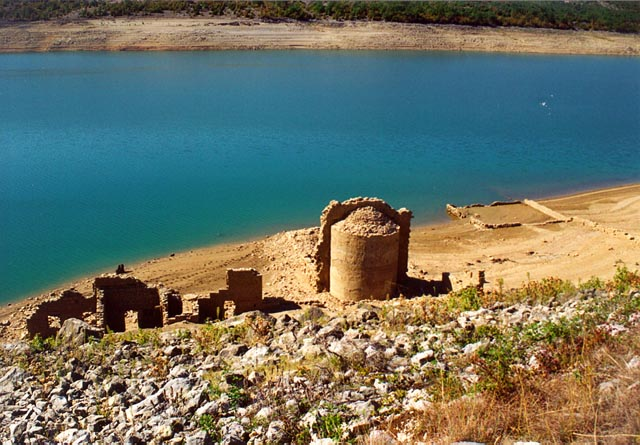
Walls of the original Monastery Dragović and Peruća Lake

According to official Serb Orthodox schematism published until late 19th century there is no known historical information about the foundation. According to Orthodox clergy which can be traced to 1811, mainly claimed by Nikodim Milaš in his Pravoslavna Dalmacija (1901), the Dragović Monastery was built in 1395, six years after the Battle of Kosovo, and after the death of Bosnian King Tvrtko, when Serbs from Bosnia moved en masse to Dalmatia, where they built this monastery. Some other accounts about the monastery are also based in his claim. Today, monastery bishop historiography still supports this claim.

Archaeologically the late medieval layer still is not confirmed, in the sources cannot be confirmed existence of a Catholic church on the site, and non-Orthodox elements found in the monastery possibly were introduced from nearby medieval Catholic church from Gornje Koljane. Based on reliable historical sources the monastery was possibly founded before the restoration of Serbian Patriarchate of Peć in 1557, and most probably by the end of the 16th century, but it would become desolate for a long time. In the late 17th century (1694), Orthodox bishop Nikodim Busović was given by Venetian authorities permission to rebuild the abandoned monastery, antica chiesa et monastero habitato da calogeri, by which was officially founded the Orthodox hierarchy and custom, but the monastery had a complex relationship to both Catholic and Orthodox authorities. Amid bad relations with Greek Catholics in Šibenik and Roman Catholic hierarchy, Busović in the end retreated from the position of bishop and died at the monastery.

The grounds on which Dragović rested were highly unstable and this, together with increasing moisture, convinced the monks to move the monastery to a better location. With Venetian permission, in 1777 hieromonk Vikentije Stojisavljević began to build the new monastery in a locality called Vinogradi. The monastery's reconstruction was very long and financially exhausting until prior Jerotej Kovačević finally supervised its completion. It eventually opened on 20 August 1867.

== Recent history ==
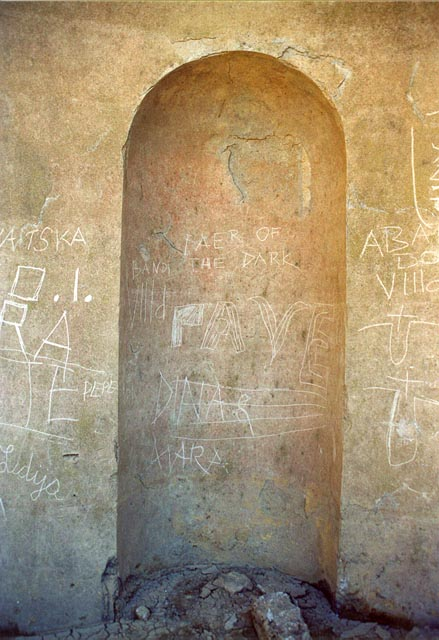
Monastery Dragović desecrated in the 1990s by Croatian forces.

In 1959, when the artificial lake for the hydroelectric power station Peruća had been made by the Yugoslav Communists, monastery Dragović was moved on a hill not far from the old fortress called Gradina.

Between 1991 and 1993, during the Croatian War of Independence, the monastery was broken into several times, and in 1995 it was abandoned, after which the church was devastated and desecrated, making it unhabitable. Later, Bishop Fotije gave his blessing to Father Đorđe Knežević to begin with the reconstruction of the monastery. In autumn 2004, basic conditions were achieved for the return of monks. Thus with the decree of Bishop Fotije, on 15 September 2004 monastery Dragović received a new brotherhood, and hieromonk Varsonufije (Rašković) was appointed their Father Superior. On the same day due to the feast of the Nativity of the Theotokos, the first Holy Hierarchal Liturgy was served in the reconstructed monastery's church.

In this way, the tradition of the gathering of Orthodox in this monastery has been established again. This assembly occurs every year on Sunday before the feast of the Nativity of the Theotokos.

== Treasury ==
Monastery Dragović used to have a rich treasury, in which was kept a number of manuscripts from 16th-18th centuries, as well as very old books written in Greek, Latin, Italian, Russian and Church Slavic.

There were also very rare antimens, among which was one made by Hristofor Zefarović dating from 1752. A great number of sacral objects mainly made in silver granulation and filigree from the 18th century were also a part of this rich treasury.

In the monastery's church, a part of Saint Gregory's relics was kept - Saint Gregory was a Serbian enlightener and Archbishop who was allegedly a descendant of Saint Nemanjić family.

== Gallery ==
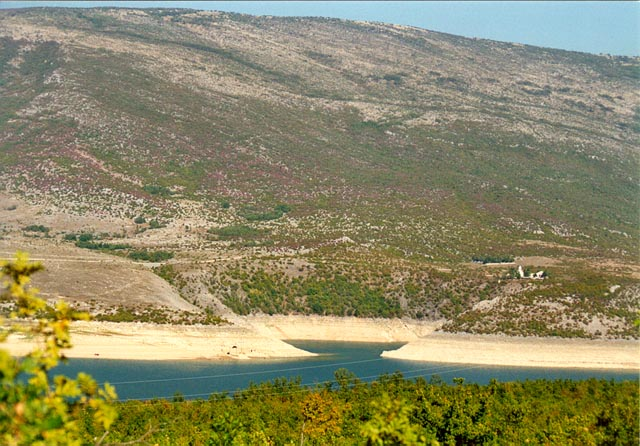

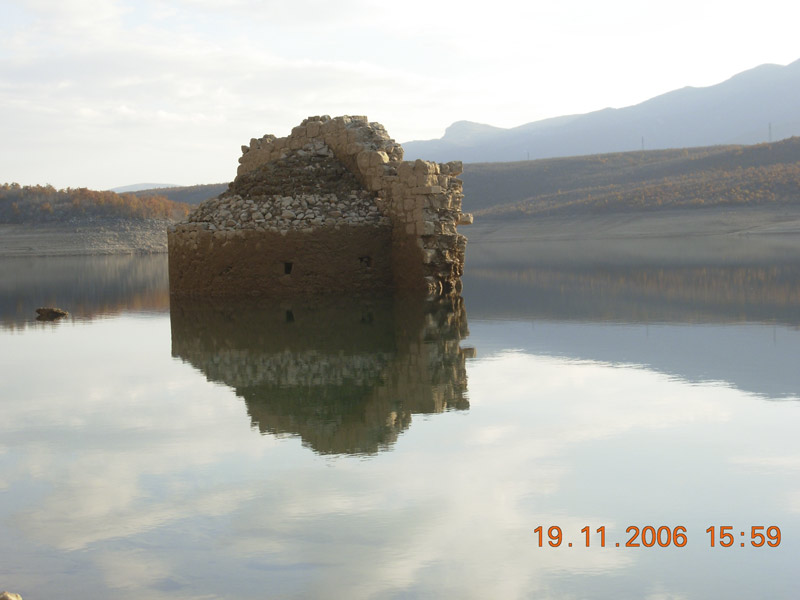

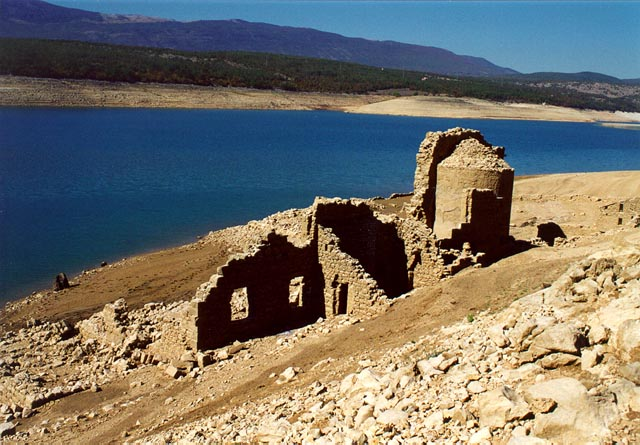

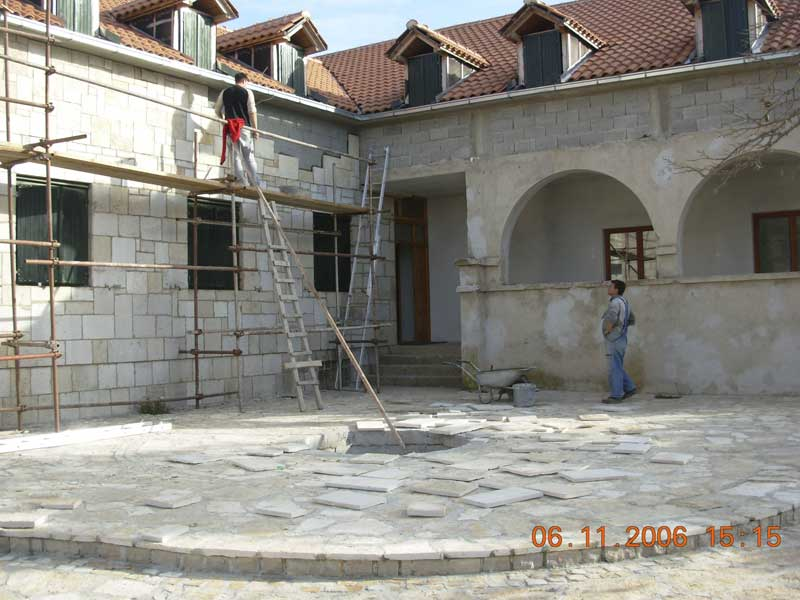

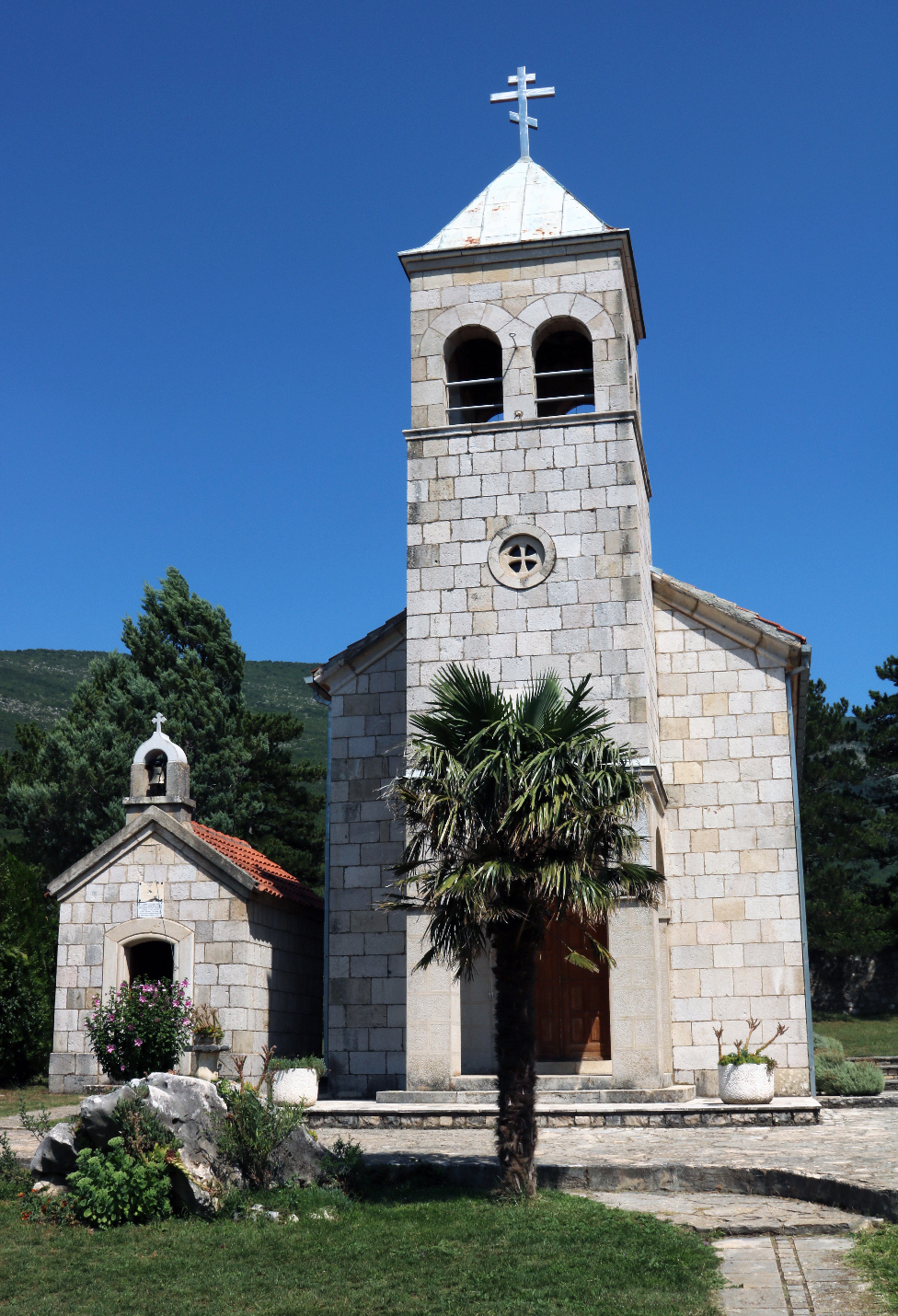

== See also ==
- List of Serbian Orthodox monasteries
