= Dračevica (župa) =

Medieval municipality, Herceg Novi, Montenegro

Dračevica was a župa in medieval Serbia, and later on in medieval Bosnia when the medieval Bosnian state conquered the area in 1377 from Đurađ I Balšić, who previously took it from Nikola Altomanović in 1373. Its later center was in Novi, a town built by Tvrtko I of Bosnia. Its location is in the mountainous areas to the northwest of Boka Kotorska and the town of Herceg Novi, in modern day Montenegro. It corresponds to the Sutorina region.

== Sources ==
- Fine, John Van Antwerp Jr. (1994) [1987]. The Late Medieval Balkans: A Critical Survey from the Late Twelfth Century to the Ottoman Conquest. Ann Arbor, Michigan: University of Michigan Press. ISBN 0472082604.
- Ćirković, Sima (2004). The Serbs. Malden: Blackwell Publishing. ISBN 9781405142915.
- Stojanović, Ljubomir (1929). Старе српске повеље и писма I. Београд.
