= Krupa monastery =

Serbian Orthodox monastery inear Obrovac, Croatia

Coordinates: 44°11′N 15°53′E

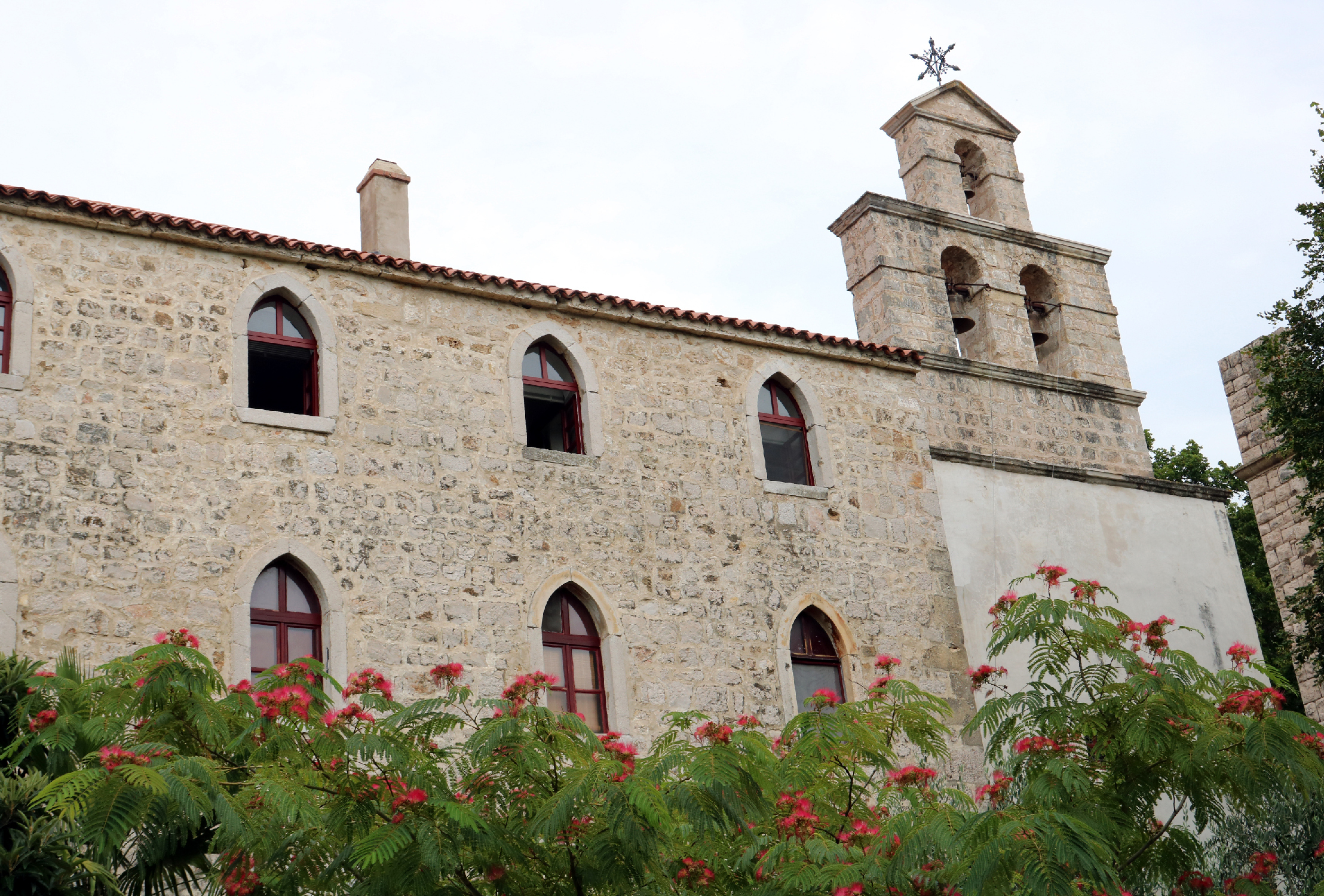
- Interactive map of Krupa monastery

Monastery information
- Full name: Manastir Krupa, Манастир Крупа
- Order: Serbian Orthodox Church
- Established: c. 1642
- Dedication: Feast of the Dormition of Theotokos

Site
- Location: Croatia
- Public access: Yes

The Krupa Monastery (Serbian: Манастир Крупа, romanized: Manastir Krupa) is the 17th century Serbian Orthodox monastery on the Krupa river in Croatia. It is one of the oldest Eastern Orthodox monasteries in Croatia, alongside Krka and Dragović monasteries.

== Location ==
It is located on the southern slopes of the Velebit mountain, halfway between the towns of Obrovac and Knin.

== History ==
According to the folk tradition, the monastery was built in 1317 by monks from Bosnia with the financial support from the Serbian king Milutin, later renovated by King Stefan Dečanski and Emperor Dušan, and in the 15th and 16th centuries endowed by Saint Angelina of Serbia. However, as the monastery has Gothic-style windows which was uncommon for the Orthodox Church, it was suggested the monastery was probably built by immigrating monks around 1642.

Cretan priest Ioannis Apakas painted four "throne icons" for the iconostasis in c.1600. Georgije Mitrofanović painted the walls in 1620–22. In the 1760s, Serbian writer and educator Dositej Obradović lived and worked in Krupa, while in the 1860s, major Serbian realist author Simo Matavulj lived and was educated in the monastery. Gerasim Zelić also lived there in the 18th century. It was completely renovated in 1855.

The surrounding konaks were burnt to the ground by the Ustaše during the World War II, who also destroyed the interior of the monastery, turning it into their military post. In the 1950s, the construction of the large belfry began but was never finished. After the outbreak of the Croatian War of Independence in 1991, the well-known monastery treasury was displaced from Krupa. During the Operation Storm, the monastery sustained damage and the local Orthodox Serbs, as well as the priests, went into exile in Serbia. The belfry and the bells were damaged, as was the chapel, while the interior was looted and partially demolished. Since 2000, the partial reconstruction of Krupa has begun. It included numerous works, such as the construction and painting of the small additional church (paraklis) and the partial adaptation of the unfinished belfry. Some of the artefacts were returned in 2010. Since the mid-2010s, the government of the Republic of Croatia has also contributed to the monastery's renovation.

History of the monastery was written in the 18th century chronicles of the Bishop of Dalmatia, Simeon Končarević.

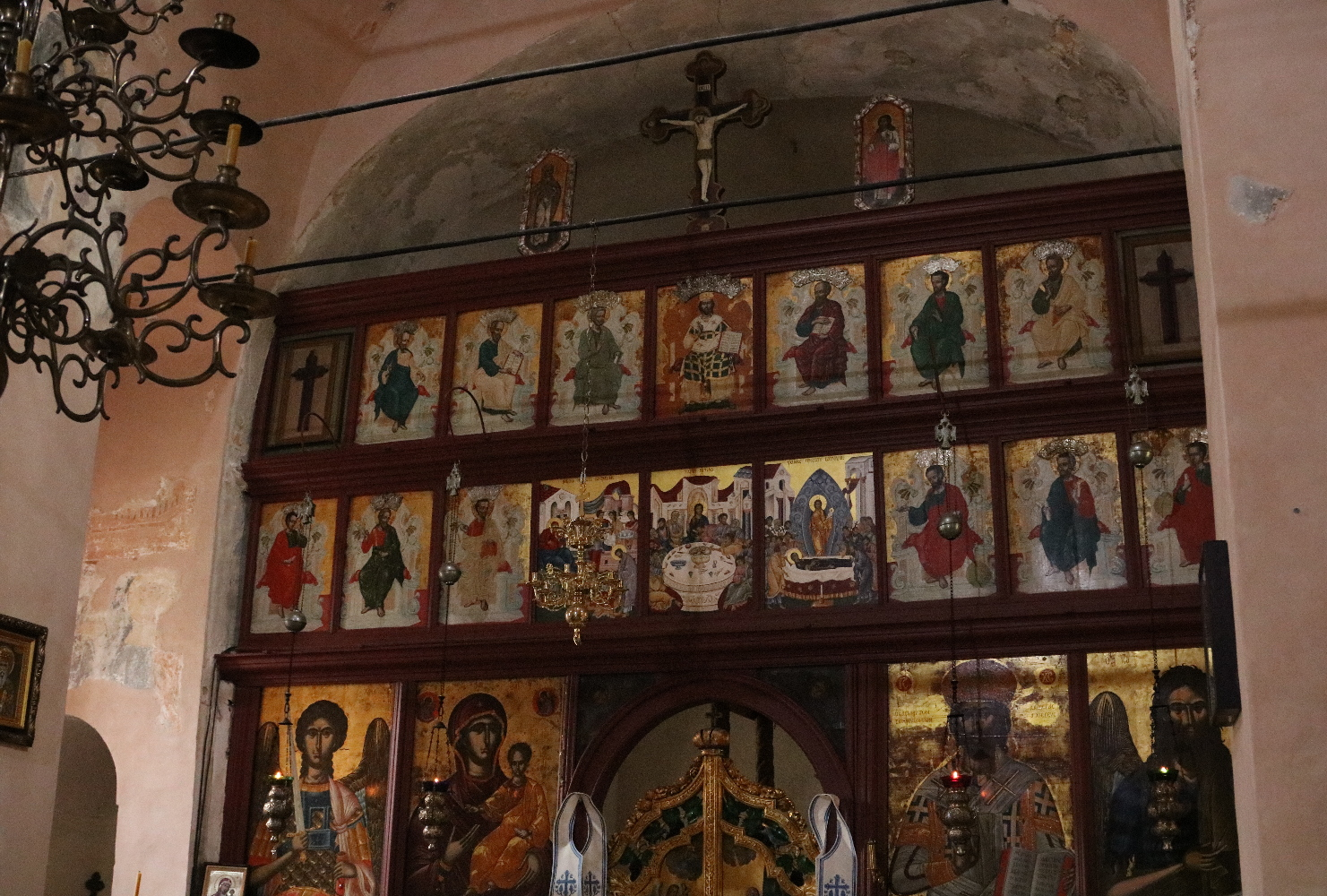
Monastery's Iconostasis

== Characteristics ==
The church of the Krupa monastery is dedicated to the Feast of the Dormition of Theotokos. In the monastery, there are beautiful frescoes, a valuable collection of icons and parts of iconostasis and a collection of several centuries-old books.

== See also ==
- List of Serbian Orthodox monasteries
