= Energy in Croatia =

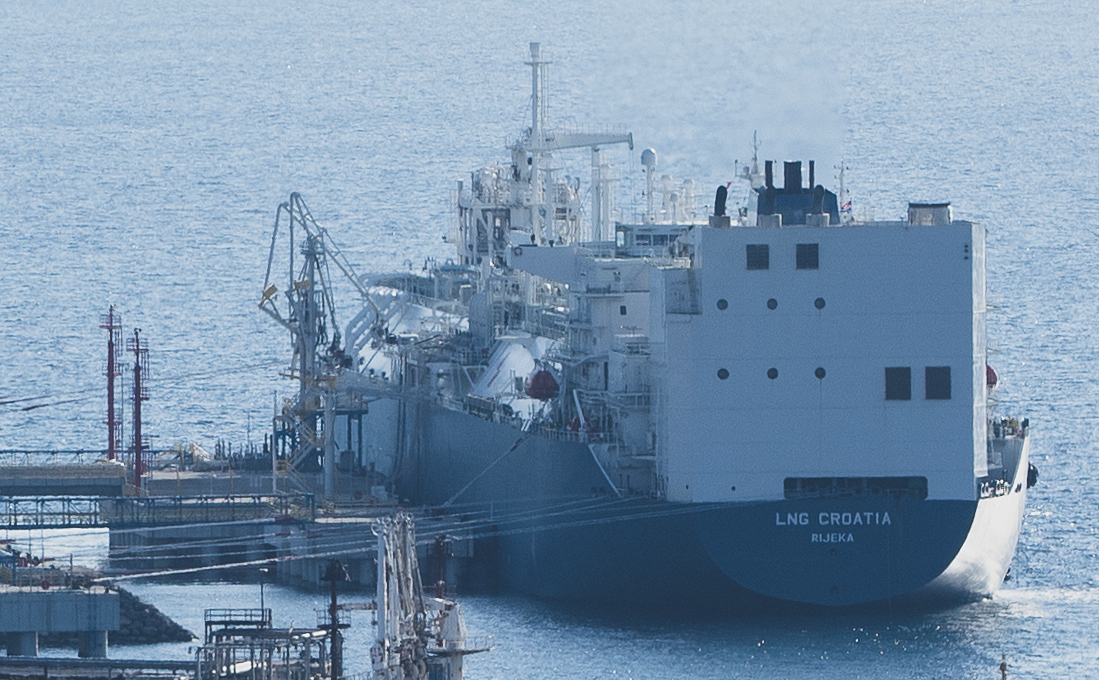
A large LNG Croatia terminal on the coast of Krk island, 2005

The energy sector of Croatia comprises the nation's total energy and electricity production, consumption and import. The majority of energy is generated through hydropower, with the highest quantity of water resources per capita in the European Union (30,000 m^{3}). The country satisfies its domestic electricity needs largely from hydro and thermal power plants. Croatia has strategic investments in liquefied natural gas (LNG), geothermal networks, and electric transport.

As of 2026, Croatia imports 54% of its energy, including the majority its natural gas, oil, petroleum, and solid fossil fuels. In addition to hydropower, renewable energy is derived from solar, wind, and geothermal power. Its expansion of LNG capacity has materially enhanced energy independence for Croatia and Southeast Europe. It operates the Krško nuclear power plant alongside neighboring Slovenia in a joint venture to supply nuclear power to the region.

== Electricity ==
Hrvatska elektroprivreda (HEP) is the national energy company charged with production, transmission and distribution of electricity.

=== Production ===
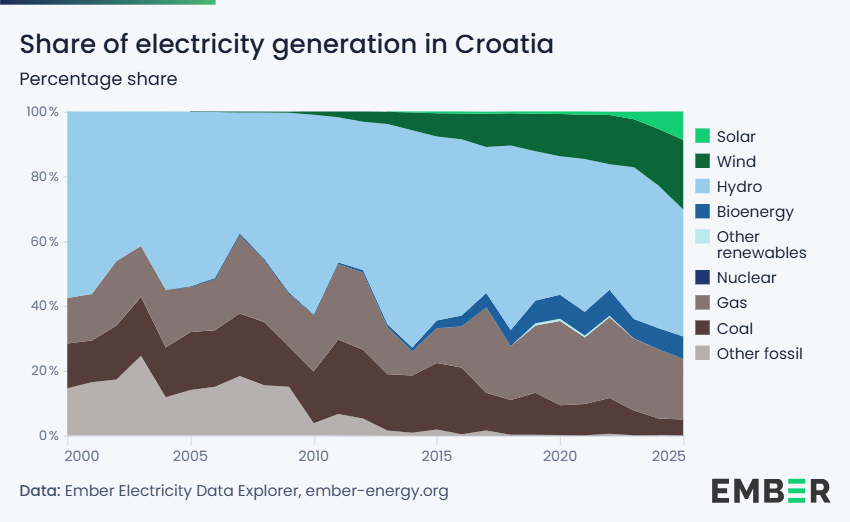
Share of electricity generation in Croatia - percentage share

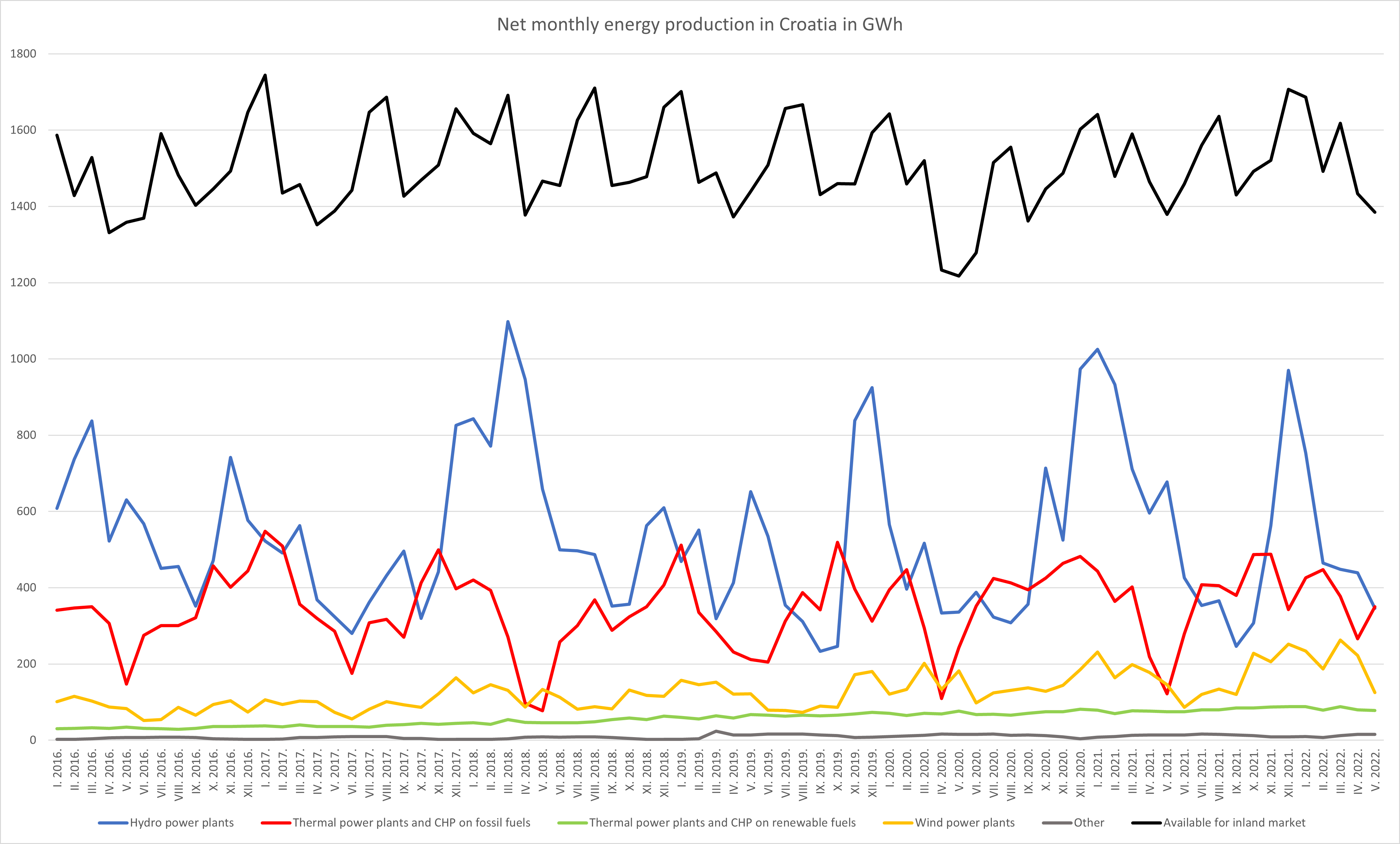
Electric energy production in Croatia from 2016 to 2022

At the end of 2022, the total available power of power plants on the territory of the Republic of Croatia was 4,946.8 MW, of which 1,534.6 MW in thermal power plants, 2,203.4 MW in hydropower plants, 986.9 MW in wind power plants and 222.0 MW in solar power plants. For the needs of the electric power system of the Republic of Croatia, 348 MW from NPP Krško is also used (ie. 50% of the total available power of the power plant in accordance with the ownership shares).

The total production of electricity in the Republic of Croatia in 2022 was 14,220.5 GWh, whereby 63.7 percent (9,064.9 GWh) was produced from renewable energy sources, including large hydropower plants. In this percentage, large hydropower plants participated with 38.4 percent (5,454.2 GWh), and 25.4 percent (3,610.8 GWh) of electricity was produced from other renewable sources (wind energy, small hydropower plants, biomass, geothermal energy, biogas and photovoltaic systems). Domestic electricity production covered 75.2 percent (14,220.5 GWh) of electricity needs, which in 2022 amounted to 18,915.3 GWh. The import of electricity in 2022 amounted to 11,919.7 GWh, which is 63.0 percent of the total realized consumption. The export of electricity amounted to 7,224.9 GWh, which is 50.8 percent of the total domestic electricity production (14,220.5 GWh).

==== Hydropower ====
Croatia has 28 hydropower plants of which 2 are reversible, 2 small size and 1 pumped storage. They are distributed in three production areas: North, West and South with one independent plant, and are HEP's most important source of renewable energy.

Hydropower plants
Name	Plum	Production capacity (MW)	Commissioned
HE Varaždin	Drava	94.635	1975
HE Čakovec	Drava	77.44	1982
HE Dubrava	Drava	79.78	1989
HE Rijeka	Rječina	36.80	1968
HE Vinodol	area of Gorski Kotar	90.00	1952
CHE Fužine	area of Gorski Kotar	4.50/-6.50	1957
RHE Lepenica	area of Gorski Kotar	0.80/-1.20	1985
HE Zeleni Vir	Kupa	1.70	1921
HE Senj	Lika and Gacka	216.00	1965
HE Senj 2	Lika and Gacka	412.00	planned
HE Sklope	Lika	22.50	1970
HE Gojak	Ogulinska Dobra and Zagorska Mrežnica	56.00	1954
HE Lešće	Donja Dobra	42.29	2010
HE Ozalj 1	Kupa	3.54	1908
HE Ozalj 2	Kupa	2.20	1952
RHE Velebit	Zrmanja	276.00/-240.00	1984
HE Miljacka	Krka	20.00	1906
MHE Krčić	Krka	0.375	1988
HE Golubić	Krka	6.54	1981
HE Jaruga	Krka	7.20	1903
HE Peruća	Cetina	60.00	1960
HE Orlovac	Livanjsko Polje	237.00	1973
HE Đale	Cetina	40.80	1989
HE Zakučac	Cetina	538.00	1961
MHE Prančevići	Cetina	1.15	2017
HE Kraljevac	Cetina	46.4	1912
HE Dubrovnik	Trebišnjica	126.00	1965
HE Zavrelje	Zavrelje	2.00	1953

==== Wind energy ====
Most of Croatian wind energy is produced by companies in private ownership for difference of other types of energy production. Out of 25 wind firms only one is owned by HEP (VE Korlat) while others are mainly owned by private companies or foreign energy corporations.

Wind farm	Connection voltage (kV)	Production capacity (MW)	Commissioned
VE Senj	220	156	2024
VE Krš-Pađene	220	142	2021
VE ZD2P & ZD3P	110	111	2023
VE Vučipolje 1	TBA	84	(planned)
VE Bradarića Kosa	110	80	(planned)
VE Korlat	110	58	2021
VE Visoka	TBA	56	2024 (planned)
VE Velika Popina (Zadar 6)	110	53.4	2011
VE Lukovac	110	48	2017
VE Boraja 2	TBA	45	2026
VE Danilo (Velika Glava)	110	43	2014
VE Vrataruša	110	42	2010
VE Zelengrad	110	42	2014
VE Ogorje	110	42	2015
VE Kamensko-Voštane	110	40	2013
VE Bruška	110	36	2011
VE Rudine	110	34.2	2015
VE Katuni	110	34.2	2016
VE Ponikve	110	34	2012
VE Jelinak	110	30	2013
VE Zelovo	TBA	30	2024 (planned)
VE Ljubač	35	29.9	2022
VE Opor	TBA	27	2026
VE Glunča	110	20.7	2016
VE Pometeno brdo	110	20	2015
VE Mazin 2	TBA	20	2024 (under construction)
VE Trtar-Krtolin	30	11.2	2007
VE Jasenice	35	10	2020
VE Crno brdo	10	10	2011
VE Kom-Orjak-Greda	35	10	2020
VE Orlice	30	9.6	2009
VE Zadar 4	10	9.2	2013
VE Ravne	10	5.95	2004

==== Thermal energy ====
There are 7 thermal power plants of which 4 are also heating plants and one is combined cycle power plant. Additionally, the first geothermal power plant was opened in 2019, but there are projects and potential for new ones.

Thermal power plants
Name	Fuel	Production capacity (MW)	Commissioned
TE Plomin	Stone coal	199.00	1970
TE Rijeka	Fuel oil	303.00	1978
KTE Jertovec	Natural gas and extra light fuel oil	78.00	1954
TE-TO Zagreb	Natural gas and gas oil	300.00	1962
EL-TO Zagreb	Natural gas and fuel oil	150.00	1907
TE-TO Osijek	Natural gas and fuel oil	89.00	1985
TE-TO Sisak	Natural gas and fuel oil	228.73	1970
GTE Velika 1	Geothermal energy	16.50	2019

==== Bioenergy ====
Five biopower plants are now located in Croatia and they are also used for heating purposes.

Biopower plants
Name	Fuel	Production capacity (MW)	Commissioned
BE-TO Osijek	Woody biomass	3.00	2017
BE-TO Sisak	Woody biomass	3.00	2017
BE-TO Glina	Woody biomass	5.00	2015
BE-TO Karlovac	Woody biomass	5.00	2020
BE-TO Brinje	Woody biomass	5.00	2022

==== Nuclear energy ====
Croatia has no nuclear power plants on its territory, but co-owns the Krško Nuclear Power Plant together with Slovenia. The Krško plant was built in the era of Yugoslavia on the territory of present-day Slovenia. Planned decommissioning is by 2043.

Nuclear power plants
Name	Fuel	Production capacity (MW)	Commissioned
NE Krško	Enriched uranium	348.00 (Note: 696 MW is total output of power plant but half of it goes to Croatia)	1983

==== Solar energy ====
In 2014, HEP built nine solar power plants on the roofs of business buildings. The power plants are located in the office building at the headquarters of HEP in Zagreb and the buildings of the HEP Distribution System Operator. Solar power plants have the status of a privileged producer of electricity, which enables the sale of produced electricity to HROTE at a preferential price. Since 2018, Hrvatska elektroprivreda has started building integrated solar power plants according to the concept of a customer with its own production. This model enables a significant reduction in costs for own consumption of electricity. Most of the produced energy is consumed in the buildings themselves, while the rest of the energy is delivered to the distribution network. HEP's first non-integrated power plant was SE Kaštelir, purchased in 2019 from a private producer, and the first independently built was SE Vis, commissioned in 2020.

Solar power plants
Name	Production capacity (MW)	Commissioned
SE Kaštelir 1	1.00	2018
SE Kaštelir 2	2.00	2021
SE Vis	3.50	2020
SE Marići	1.00	2021
SE Kosore jug (Vrlika)	2.10	2021
SE Stankovci	2.50	2022
SE Obrovac	7.35	2022
SE Donja Dubrava	9.99	2023
SE Radosavci	9.99	under construction
SE Jambrek	4.99	2025
SE Cres	6.50	under construction
SE Črnkovci	8.50	2025
SE Dugopolje	10.00	2025
SE Virje	9.00	2023
SE Lipik	5.00	2025
SE Sisak	2.65	under construction
SE Pometeno brdo	80.00	planned
SE Topusko	13.00	planned
SE Promina	150.00	planned
SE Korlat	75.00	2026
SE Čakovec	8.50	under construction
SE Sukošan	45.00	planned
9 integrated SPP of privileged producers	0.21	2014–present
56 integrated SPP in the status of customer with own production	2.575	2018–present

=== Transmission ===
Croatian transmission grid consists of lines on three different rated voltage levels, namely 400, 220 and 110 kV. Total length of high-voltage lines is 7,763.53 km (4,824.03 mi) while length of medium and low voltage lines is 141,936.9 km (88,195.50 mi). The grid was often the target of attacks during Croatian War of Independence, resulting in frequent black-outs during the period. Since then, the grid has been repaired, and reconnected to synchronous grid of Continental Europe synchronous zones 1 and 2, making it an important transit system again.

=== Distribution ===
Under the 2004 Energy law, customers in Croatia are allowed to choose their preferred distributor of electricity. However, HEP Operator distribucijskog sustava or HEP-ODS (a Hrvatska elektroprivreda subsidiary) remains the largest distributor to both industry and households. Its distribution grid is 142,365 km (88,461.51 mi) long, with 26 859 transformers installed, totaling 23,421 MVA of power. In 2022 there were 2,133,522 customers, 95.8% of which were households.

=== Development projects ===
==== Hydropower ====
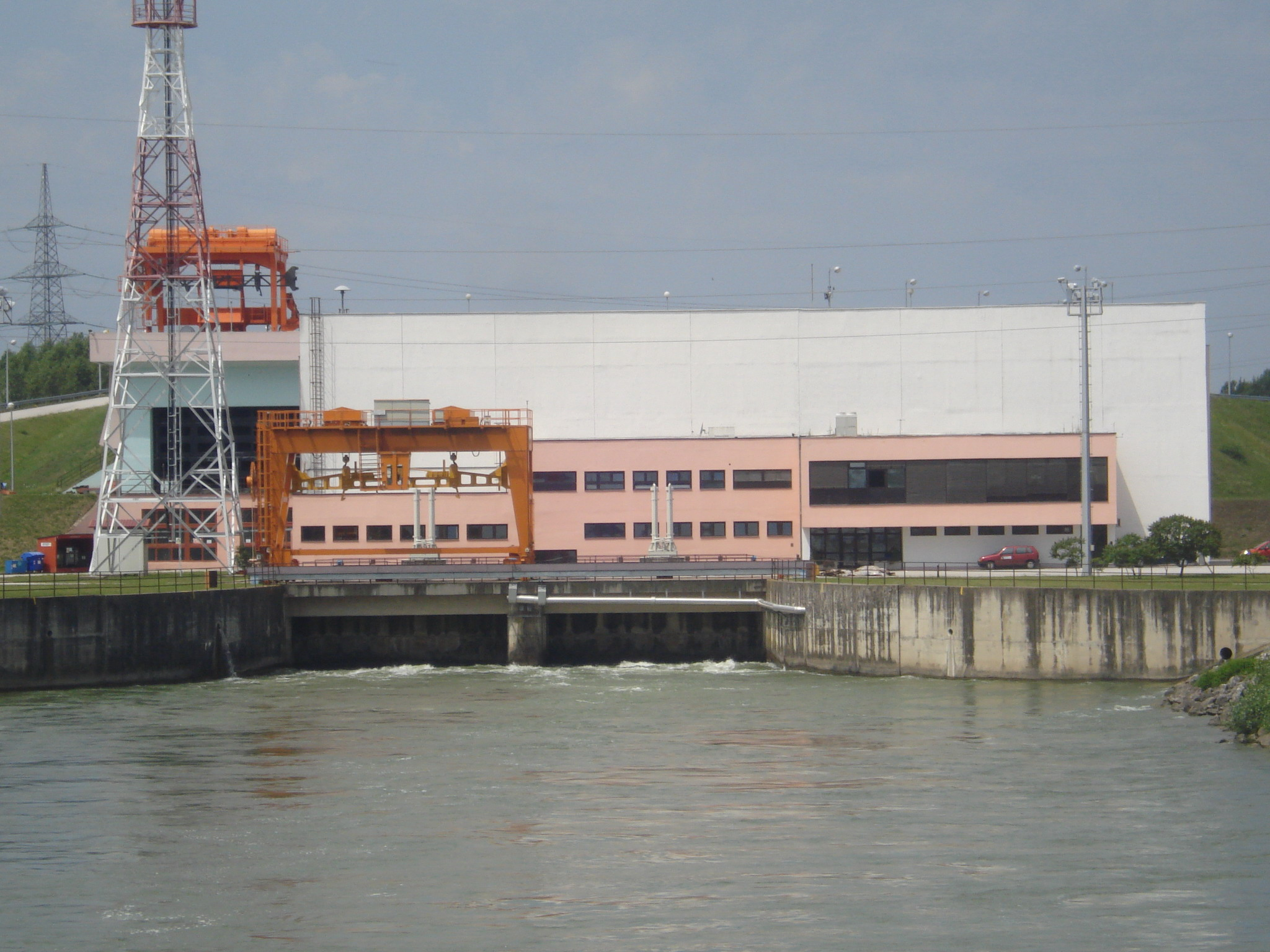
Dubrava Hydroelectric Power Plant, 2014

With the implementation of the project HE Senj 2, HEP intends to use the remaining hydro potential in the Lika and Gacka basins by upgrading the existing hydropower system. The project involves the construction of a large reservoir and additional capacity in order to transfer production to the top of the daily chart. This will enable the capacity to inject high regulatory power into the power system with flexible hydro units ready for rapid power change. The construction of the hydroelectric power plant will cost 3.4 billion kuna and will have an installed capacity of 412 MW, while the construction deadline is 2028.

==== Wind energy ====
In 2023, Croatia had capacity of 1143 MW of Wind energy. In July 2022, the Spanish company Acciona Energia announced an investment of one hundred million euros in the construction of two wind farms. One will be built in the vicinity of Split, and the other between Šibenik and Knin and will contain 16 wind turbines with a production of 203 GWh of clean electricity per year. The projects named Opor and Boraja 2 will be sufficient to supply 60 thousand households, and the propellers will start spinning at these locations in 2024, after a year and a half of construction and testing. This will avoid the annual emission of 135,000 tons of CO_{2}. In 2013, the same company built the Jelinak wind park worth 48 million euros.

The European Bank for Reconstruction and Development (EBRD) will grant a loan of EUR 43 million to the company Kunovac, jointly owned by the funds Taaleri Energia SolarWind II and ENCRO Kunovac, for the construction and operation of two onshore wind farms in the Zadar region. Zagrebačka banka and Croatian bank for reconstruction and development will participate in the financing with a total loan amount of 126 million euros, and the total network capacity of the two power plants is 111 megawatts, which is enough to power 85,000 households. In January 2023, the Greek energy company EuroEnergy announced that it was taking over the 114 MW wind farm project in Lika-Senj County. The acquisition reserves the right to expand with an additional 70.5 MW of wind capacity, subject to grid upgrades that can increase production. The value of the project is EUR 150 million and will be realized in the area of Udbina.

The action plan for renewable energy sources at sea is the first comprehensive study that looks at the possibilities of renewable energy development in the Adriatic, and it was financed by the European Bank for Reconstruction and Development. The study considered two technologies: wind farms (stationary and floating) and floating solar farms. Through a spatial analysis of numerous ecological and other technical parameters, the experts came up with data on the possibility of RES development in five zones with an area of 1,260 square kilometers, of which 204 km2 is within the territorial sea. It has been calculated that a 25 GW RES power plant could be installed on that surface. If the area where the medium impact on the landscape is assessed is added to that area, the possible area for RES increases to an additional 1,602 km2 and 44 GW. The development of offshore wind farms in these zones depends on concession agreements between INA and the Republic of Croatia. Also, if hydrocarbon exploitation areas in the central and southern Adriatic are added to that area, a possible 26,000 square kilometers for floating wind power plants and solar power plants will be reached, due to greater depth.

==== Thermal power ====
In December 2019, the project of building a new high-efficiency combi-cogeneration unit KKE EL-TO Zagreb began, electric power 150 MW. The construction lasts for three years, and this project will replace part of the dilapidated and obsolete units at the EL-TO Zagreb location. It is expected for a unit to start working in the summer of 2023.

==== Nuclear power ====
In 1978, the Adriatic island of Vir was selected as a location for a future nuclear power plant, but these plans were abandoned. According to reports, since 2009 Croatia has been discussing the option of building a nuclear power plant with Albania, in a location on the shore of Shkodër Lake, on the border with Albania and Montenegro. In April 2009 the Croatian government denied that any agreement had been signed.

In a 2012 poll among 447 Croatian citizens, who were asked "Do you think it is justified to use nuclear energy for the production of electricity?", 42% answered "yes" and 44% answered "no". In 2021 the Slovenian government has issued an energy permit to GEN Energija for the planning and construction of the second unit of the Krško Nuclear Power Plant, followed by a statement by the Minister of Economy and Sustainable Development of Croatia Tomislav Ćorić that Croatia "will not look benevolently at the construction of the new bloc". In March 2022, Plenković confirmed Croatia's readiness to enter the project of building the second block of the Krško NPP.

==== Solar power ====
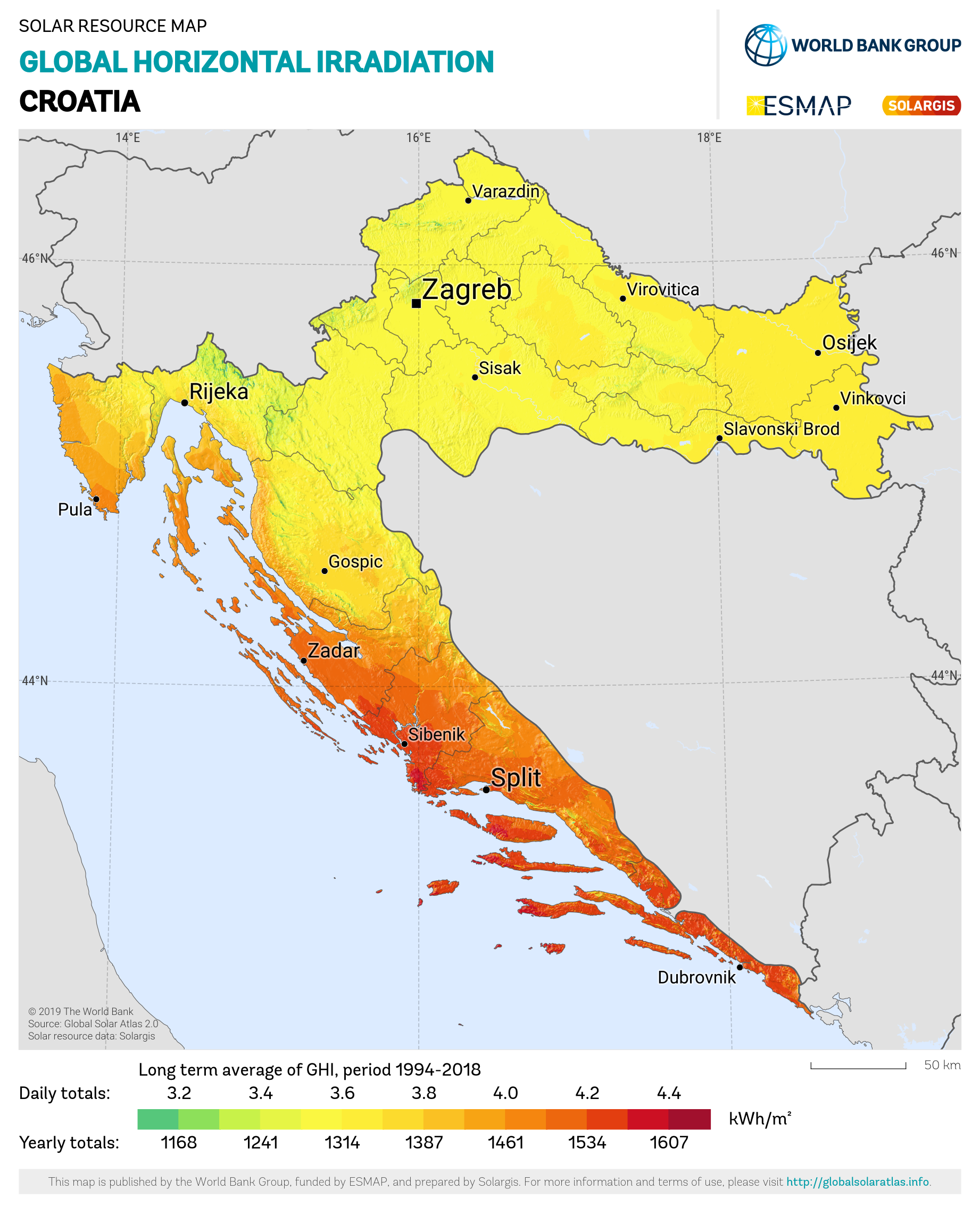
Solar energy available for power generation across Croatia in 2021

As of 2021, Croatia had 100 MW of solar power, providing 0.4% of electricity. The potential for solar energy in Croatia is estimated at 6.8 GW, of which 5.3 GW would be accounted for by utility-scale photovoltaic plants and 1.5 GW by rooftop solar systems. Croatia plans to install 1.5 GW of solar capacity by 2024. The total solar power grid-connected capacity in Croatia was 461 MW as 2023.

In May 2023, Acciona Energy announced the construction of the largest solar power plant in Croatia. The new power plant will be spread over three million square meters of rugged state land and will have a capacity of 150 MW, which is enough to meet the needs of around 100,000 households. Its official name is SE Promina.

==== Battery storage ====
In September 2022, the European Commission approved state support in the amount of 19.8 million euros for the project of building a large-capacity battery system. The project will be built in Šibenik, and will enter into operation in 2023 with a capacity of 10 MW, and ultimately the capacity will be 50 MW.

==== Geothermal energy ====
The results of the geothermal potential research showed that the Virovitica-Podravina County lies on a geothermal basin. The value of the Geothermal Potential Research project in Virovitica-Podravine County, which began in 2019, amounts to 304,169 euros. Therefore, the construction of a geothermal power plant with a capacity of 20 megawatts is planned in that area, which has the potential to become the largest such power plant in Europe. It is designed up to 1,300 meters, and hot water is expected already at 600 meters. An exploratory well was completed in the area of Čađavica, which discovered a geothermal source at a depth of 4,300 meters. The areas of Orahovica, Slatina and Nova Bukovica also have geothermal potential.

== Domestic usage ==
Electricity:

- Production: 13,696 GWh (2022)
- Consumption: 18,391 GWh (2022)
- Exports: 7,225 GWh (2022)
- Imports: 11,920 GWh (2022)

Electricity:

- Hydro: 30% (2024)
- Thermal: 18% (2024)
- Nuclear: 13% (2024)
- Renewable: 8% (2024)
- Imports: 31% (2024)

Crude Oil:

- Production: 594 thousand tons (2022)
- Consumption: 2.306 million tons (2022)
- Exports: 202 thousand tons (2022)
- Imports: 1,979 million tons (2022)
- Proved Reserves: 3,508,900 cubic metres (22,070,000 bbl) (2022)

Natural Gas:

- Production: 745 million m^{3} (2022)
- Consumption: 2,529 billion m^{3} (2022)
- Exports: 1,063 million m^{3} (2022)
- Imports: 3,022 billion m^{3} (2022)
- Proved Reserves: 15.592,4 million m^{3} (2022)

== See also ==
- Wind power in Croatia
- Industry in Croatia
