= List of power stations in Croatia =

All power stations in Croatia are owned and operated by Hrvatska elektroprivreda (HEP), the national power company. As of 2015, HEP operates 26 hydroelectric, 4 thermal and 3 cogenerating power plants with the total installed electrical power of 3.654 MW.

== Hydroelectric ==
Station	Location	Coordinates	Capacity (MW)
Čakovec Hydroelectric Power Plant	Orehovica		76
Dubrava Hydroelectric Power Plant	Donja Dubrava		76
Rijeka Hydroelectric Power Plant	Rijeka		36,8
Gojak Hydroelectric Power Plant	Ogulin		55,5
Ozalj Hydroelectric Power Plant	Ozalj		5,5
Lešće Hydroelectric Power Plant	Generalski Stol		42,29
Krka River Hydroelectric Power Plant	Oklaj		36,64
Peruća Hydroelectric Power Plant	Satrić		60
Orlovac Hydroelectric Power Plant	Ruda		249
Đale Hydroelectric Power Plant	Trilj		40,8
Kraljevac Hydroelectric Power Plant	Zadvarje		46,4
Zakučac Hydroelectric Power Plant	Omiš		486
Dubrovnik Hydroelectric Power Plant	Dubrovnik		218
Varaždin Hydroelectric Power Plant	Sračinec		94
Velebit Pumped Storage Power Plant	Velebit		276
Senj Hydroelectric Power Plant	Senj		216
Vinodol Hydroelectric Power Plant	Vinodol		110

The Jaruga Hydroelectric Power Plant is the first commercial hydro power plant in Europe, and the second oldest in the world. It started with operation on 28 August 1895 at 20:00, two days after the Adams Power Plant on the Niagara Falls, and in 1903 it was moved to its current location.

== Other thermal ==
Name	Location	Coordinates	Fuel	Capacity (MWe)	Operational	Notes
Plomin Power Station	Plomin	45.1366904°N 14.1627717°E	Coal	330	1970–2018 2000–	340 metres tall chimney.
Rijeka Thermal Power Station	Bakar	45.2863612°N 14.5200956°E	Oil	320	1978–	
Sisak Thermal Power Station	Sisak		Oil	420	1970–1976	
Velika 1 Geothermal Power Plant	Ciglena	45.8566299°N 16.9450757°E	Geothermal	17	2019–	Temporarily ceased operations in early 2022.

== See also ==
- List of power stations in Europe
- List of largest power stations in the world
