= Ante Šupuk =

Croatian politician and entrepreneur (1838–1904)

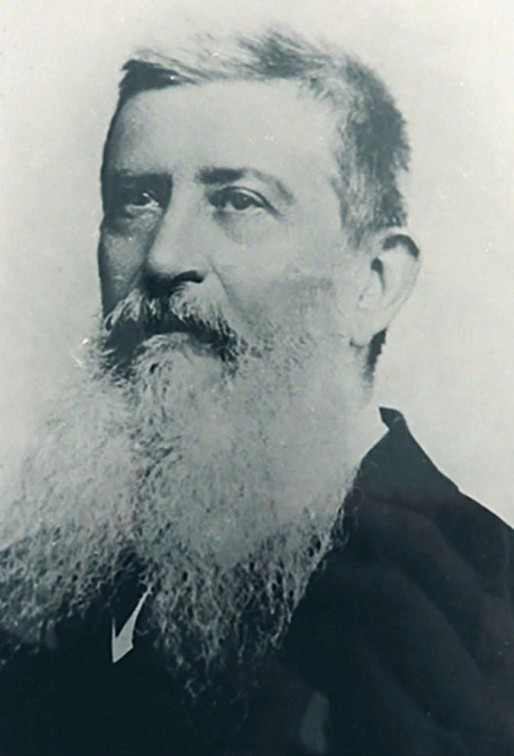
Ante Šupuk

Ante Šupuk (21 August 1838 – 11 May 1904) was a Croatian politician and entrepreneur who served as a mayor of Šibenik. In 1895 he built the Jaruga Hydroelectric Power Plant as one of the world's first alternating current hydroelectric power plants, and connected it to a lighting system. It was the first of its kind in Dalmatia and Croatia.

Ante Šupuk was a generally influential mayor of Šibenik, the first Croat mayor to be elected under universal suffrage in 1872. He held the office in three periods: 1873–1882, 1886–1892, and 1896–1903. During his tenure, the city built a number of features: a railroad connection (1877), waterworks (1879), a sewer system, and a new harbor, a new hospital building (1883).

In 1893, Šupuk and one Vjekoslav Meichsner started a business and obtained a license to use the waters of river Krka, and in 1894 they obtained permission to set up electrical power lines on municipal property in order to start lighting the streets with electric power. The construction of the Jaruga Hydroelectric Power Plant started in 1894 and lasted for 16 months. It had a two-phase generator that produced 0.6 MW of electric power. It was connected to the city with an 11 km (6.8 mi) long 3 kV power line, where it was transformed to 110 V. On August 28, 1895, the first electric street lights lit up in Šibenik. This achievement made Šibenik the third city in the world with alternating current-powered street lights. In 1904, Šupuk's company built a new power plant, Jaruga II, still operational today.
