= Roški Slap Hydroelectric Power Plant =

Hydroelectric power plant in Šibenik-Knin, Dalmatia, Croatia

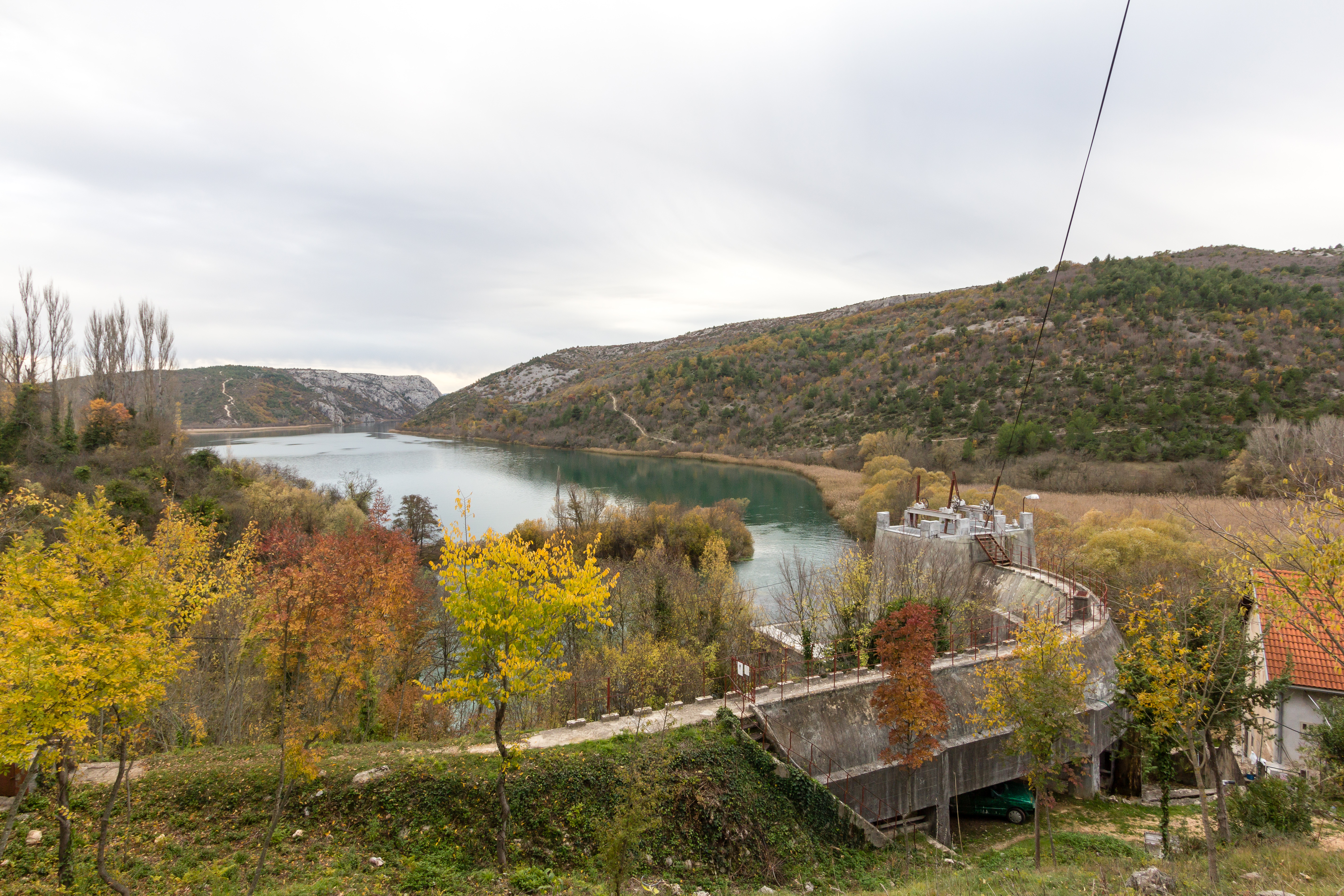

- Location within Croatia
- Interactive map of Roški Slap Hydroelectric Power Plant
- Official name: Roški Slap Hydroelectric Power Plant
- Country: Croatia
- Location: Bogatić - Miljevci
- Coordinates: 43.906214°N 15.974503°E
- Purpose: Electricity generation
- Status: Operational
- Opening date: 1910
- Owner: Hidro-watt d.o.o.
- Operator: Hidro-watt d.o.o.

Dam and spillways
- Type of dam: Weir
- Impounds: Krka
- Spillway type: Weir

Reservoir
- Creates: Roški Slap

Roški Slap Hydroelectric Power Plant
- Coordinates: 43.905762°N 15.972485°E
- Operator: Hidro-watt d.o.o.
- Commission date: 1998
- Type: diversion
- Hydraulic head: 18,3 m
- Turbines: 2 x Ossberger synchronous turbines 1130 kVA, (0,882 MW)
- Installed capacity: 1.764 MW
- Annual generation: 6 GW

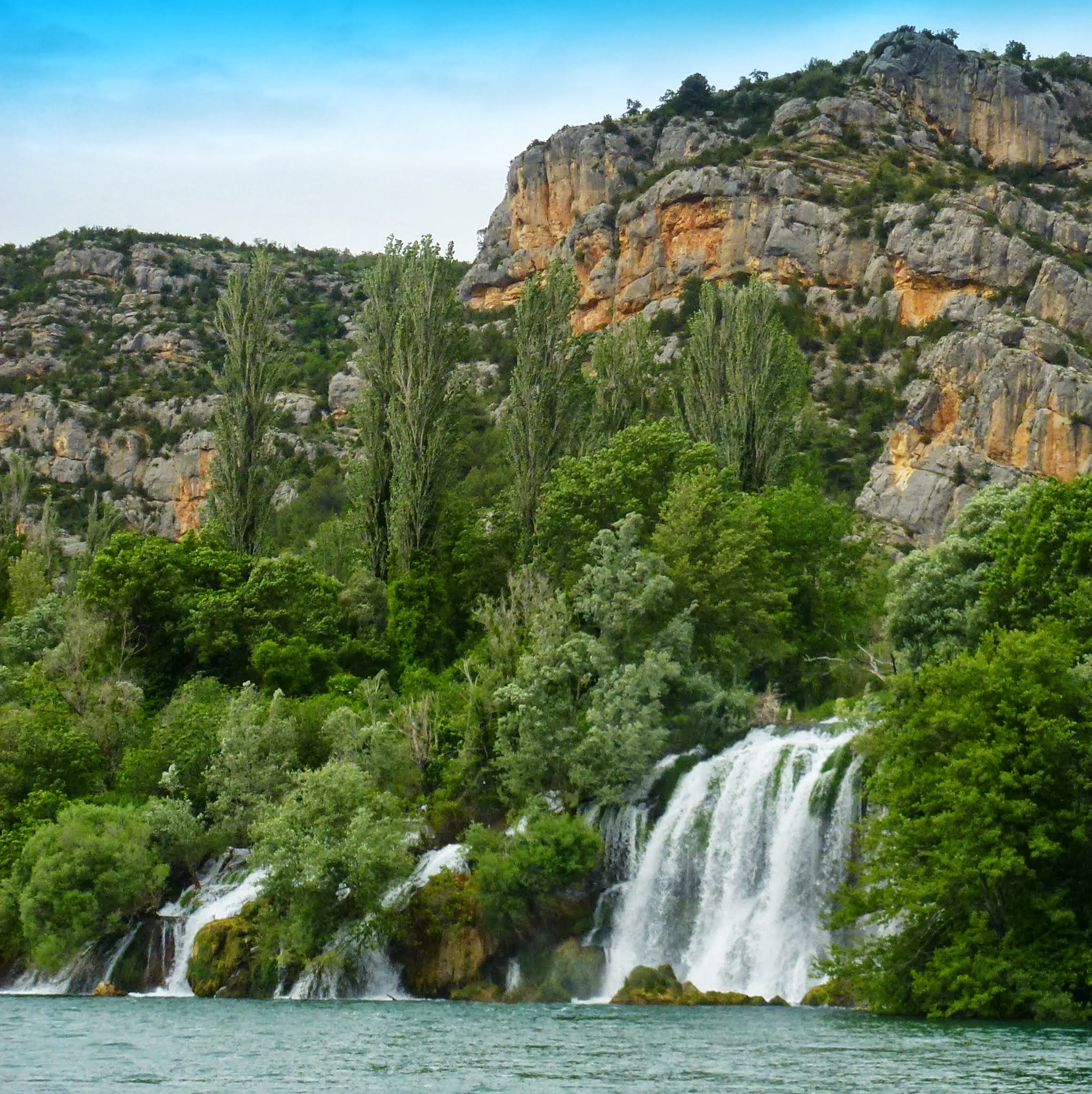
The hydroelectric power plant is situated near the Roški slap (=Roški waterfall)

Roški Slap Hydroelectric Power Plant is a hydroelectric power plant on river Krka, located in Šibenik-Knin County, in central Dalmatia, Croatia.

The Roški Slap - Hydroelectric Power Plant is a very small power plant of only 1MW. It was built in 1910 on the Krka River near Miljevci, east of the town of Drniš, some 25–30 km downstream from the town of Knin.

It is operated by Hrvatska elektroprivreda.

== The Krka River catchment Hydropower structures ==
- Golubić Hydroelectric Power Plant
- Small Krčić Hydroelectric Power Plant
- Miljacka Hydroelectric Power Plant
- Roški Slap Hydroelectric Power Plant
- Jaruga Hydroelectric Power Plant

== See also ==
- Krka
- Krka National Park
- Drniš
