= Velebit (disambiguation) =

Velebit is a mountain range in Croatia.

Velebit may also refer to:

- National Park Sjeverni Velebit, located in the northern part of the Velebit mountain range
- Vladimir Velebit (1907–2004), Yugoslav communist
- Velebit, Kanjiža, a village in Serbia
- Velebit (P-01), Croatian submarine in service from 1996 to 2001.
- Velebit Pumped Storage Power Plant
- VELEbit, Croatian supercomputer

== See also ==
- Velebites, cephalopod genus
