= Golubić Hydroelectric Power Plant =

- Country: Croatia
- Coordinates: 44°05′55″N 16°13′22″E

Golubić Hydroelectric Power Plant is a hydroelectric power plant on river Butižnica located in Šibenik-Knin County, in central Dalmatia, Croatia.

The Golubić - Hydroelectric Power Plant is a small high-pressure diversion-type facility harnessing the Butišnica River water. The hydro plant is located 7 km north of the town of Knin, in the village of Golubić.

It is operated by Hrvatska elektroprivreda.

== Other Krka River catchment hydropower structures ==
- Small Krčić Hydroelectric Power Plant
- Miljacka Hydroelectric Power Plant
- Roški Slap Hydroelectric Power Plant
- Jaruga Hydroelectric Power Plant

== See also ==
- Krka
