= Topoljski Buk =

Coordinates: 44°02′30″N 16°14′07″E

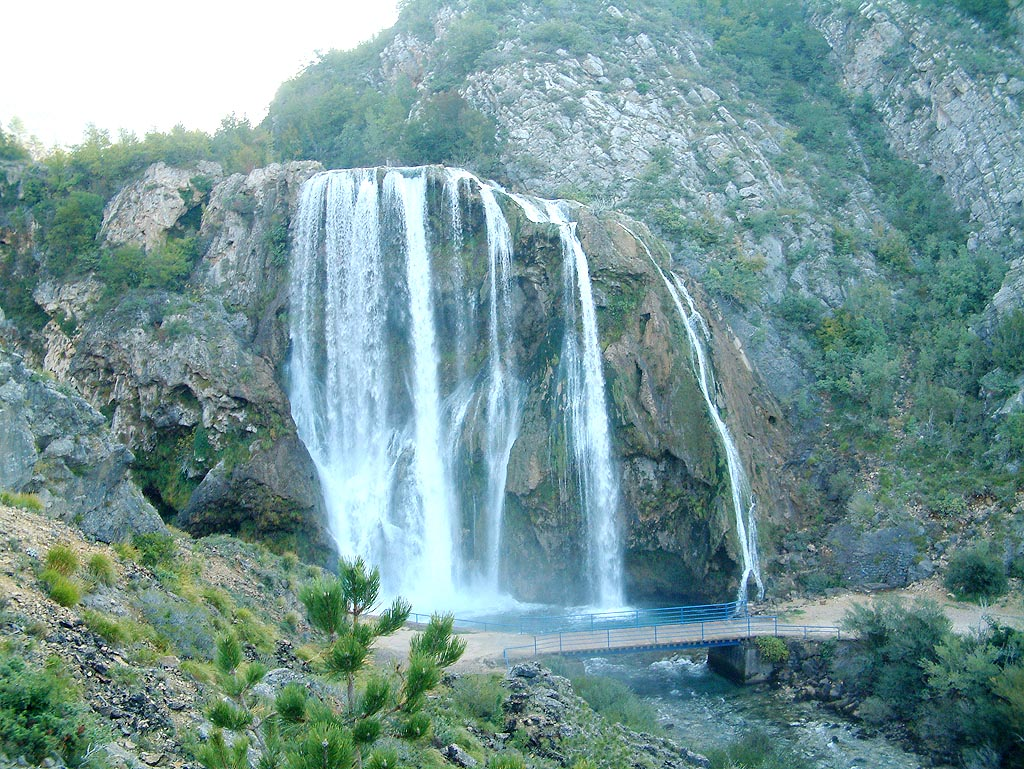
Topoljski a.k.a. Krčić Waterfall

The Topoljski Buk, also Krčić Waterfall and Veliki Buk, is a 22-meter-high waterfall in the north of the Kninsko Polje, where the Krčić stream flows into Krka. After excavations using explosive, damming, construction of a chamber in its travertine barrier and finally construction of the Krčić Hydroelectric Power Plant, the waterfall is reduced to an intermittent waterfall directly above the source of the Krka River.

Geographically, it is located near the city of Knin and is fed by waters from Dinara. A macadam road connecting Knin with Kijevo passes by the Krčić. It was built a little over 200 years ago.

The Krčić waterfall is mentioned in local folk tales, there used to be a fort on the hill to the left of the waterfall that served to defend the nearby bridge. Legend has it that people will rebuild the bridge when the intermittent Krčić stream never dries up again and people stop quarrel and fight each other.

== Gallery ==
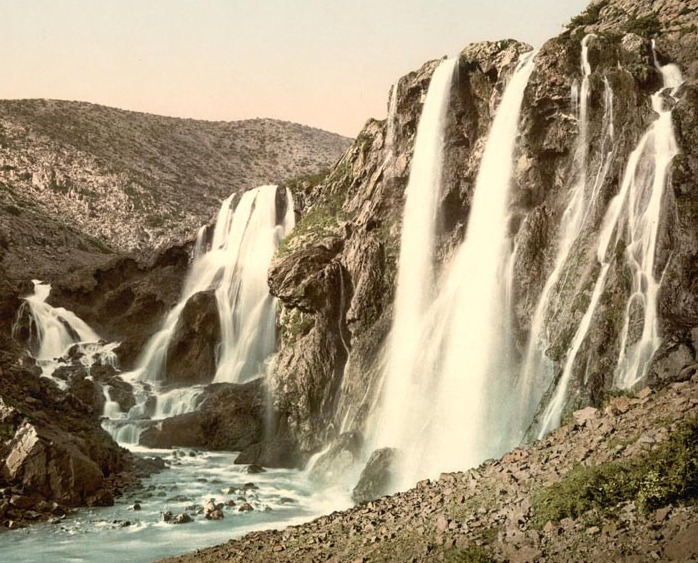
Natural state

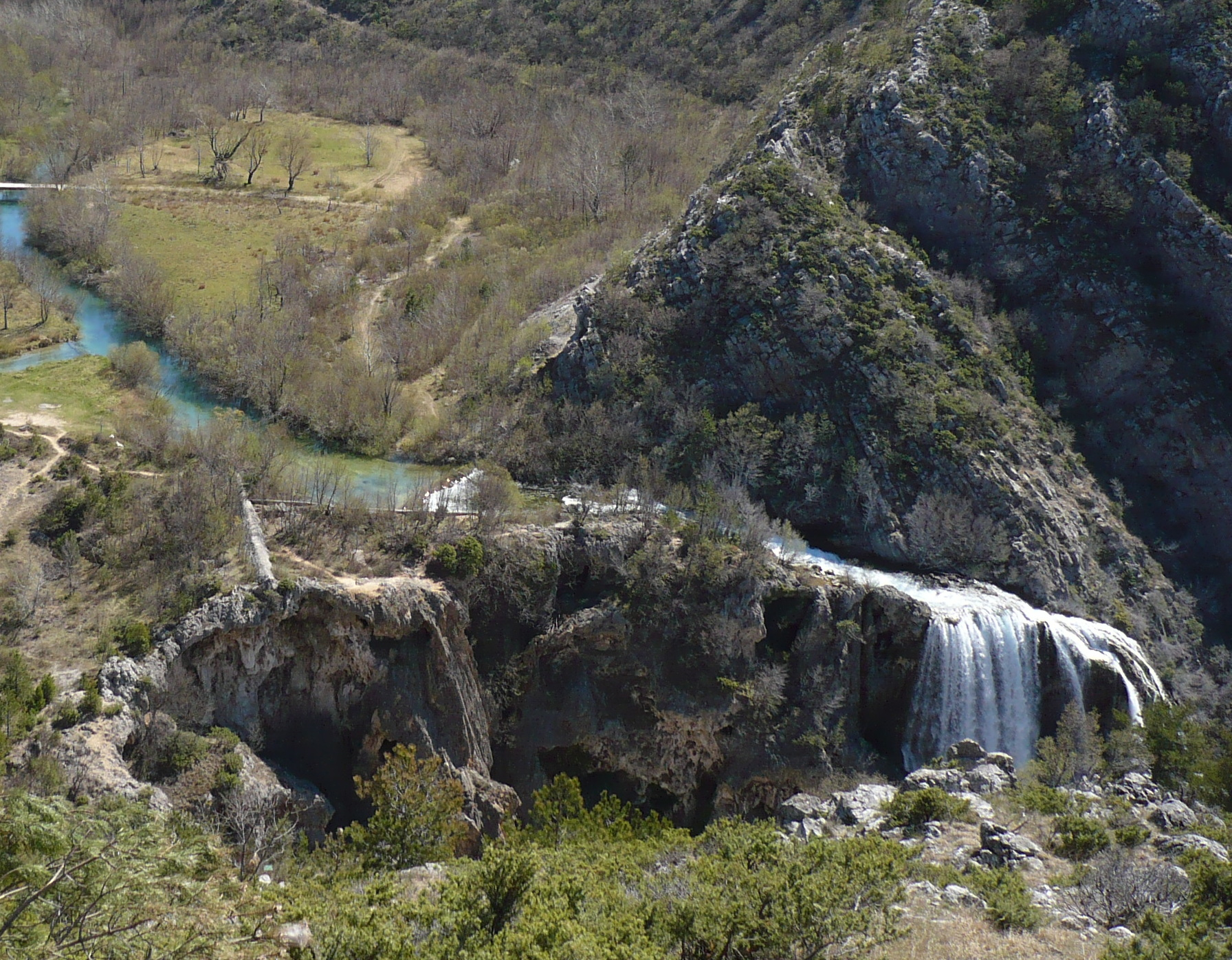
View from above

== See also ==
- List of Dinaric travertine waterfalls
