= Plomin Power Station =

Coal-fired power station in Istria County, Croatia

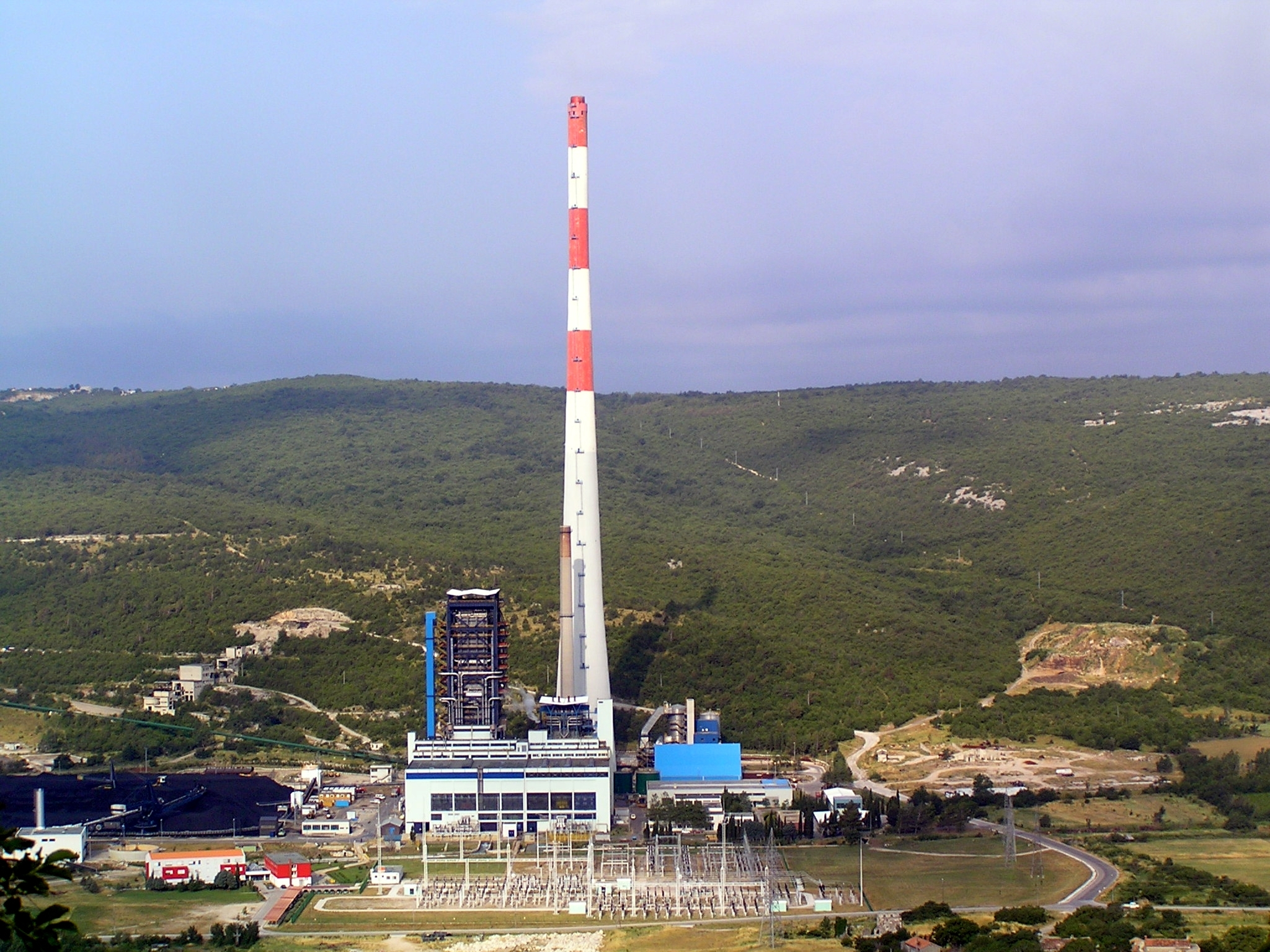
- Plomin Power Station
- Official name: Termoelektrana Plomin
- Country: Croatia
- Location: Plomin, Istria County
- Coordinates: 45°8′11″N 14°9′54″E
- Status: Operational
- Construction began: 1968
- Commission date: 1970
- Decommission date: 2018 (Block A)
- Owner: HEP
- Operator: HEP Proizvodnja

Thermal power station
- Primary fuel: Hard coal

Power generation
- Units operational: 1
- Units decommissioned: 1
- Nameplate capacity: 199 MW

External links
- Website: www.hep.hr/proizvodnja/termoelektrane-1560/termoelektrane/te-plomin/1563
- Commons: Related media on Commons

Plomin Power Station (Croatian: Termoelektrana Plomin, TE Plomin) is a coal-fired power station located near Plomin in Istria County, Croatia. The facility is operated by Hrvatska elektroprivreda (HEP) through HEP Proizvodnja.

The site contains two generating units, known as Block A and Block B (TE Plomin 2). Block A entered service in 1970 and is no longer available for electricity generation. Block B entered commercial operation in 2000 and was modernized in 2017.

HEP currently lists the site's available generating capacity as 217 MW gross and 199 MW net. The technical documentation lists 342 MW of total installed connection capacity for the two historical units: 125 MW for Block A and 217 MW for Block B. Block A is currently listed with zero available capacity.

The station uses hard coal as its fuel. Common facilities at the site include a special-purpose port, coal transport and storage facilities, cooling systems, water-treatment facilities, ash and slag handling facilities, wastewater treatment systems and a 340-metre chimney.

== History ==
=== Block A ===
The first generating unit at the site, TE Plomin 1 or Block A, entered service in 1970. HEP's current technical documentation lists the unit with a nominal capacity of 125 MW and a connection to the 110 kV network.

Block A was subject to Croatia's environmental permitting system for large combustion installations. Its environmental permit expired on 1 January 2018, after which the unit ceased to be available for electricity generation.

The expiry of the permit followed the implementation of stricter environmental requirements for large combustion plants under Croatian legislation and European Union environmental law.

=== Block B ===
The second unit, TE Plomin 2 or Block B, entered commercial operation in 2000.

The project was developed through TE Plomin d.o.o., a joint venture established by HEP and the German energy company RWE. HEP's 2017 consolidated financial statements state that HEP and RWE entered into a joint-venture agreement in November 1996 and established TE Plomin d.o.o. with each partner initially holding 50 percent.

The agreement between HEP and RWE expired in May 2015. HEP subsequently became the sole owner of TE Plomin d.o.o. and the company was merged into HEP on 1 August 2017.

Block B originally had a nominal electrical output of 210 MW. During a major overhaul in 2017, the low-pressure section of the turbine was modernized. HEP states that the work increased the nominal output of the turbo-generator by 7 MW, to 217 MW.

The unit is connected to the electricity transmission system at 220/110 kV.

== Technical characteristics ==
The Plomin station is a conventional coal-fired steam power plant. The generating units use condensing steam turbines.

Technical characteristics
Parameter	Block A	Block B
Designation	TE Plomin 1	TE Plomin 2
Fuel	Hard coal	Hard coal
Type	Condensing	Condensing
Year of construction/commissioning	1970	2000
Nominal capacity	125 MW	217 MW
Available capacity	0 MW	217 MW
Grid connection	110 kV	220/110 kV
Current status	Not available for generation	Operational

HEP's current technical data give 342 MW as the connection capacity for the two-unit site. The figure consists of 125 MW for Block A and 217 MW for Block B; however, Block A is listed with zero available capacity.

The current available generating capacity is therefore 217 MW gross, with HEP reporting 199 MW net.

=== Fuel supply ===
The station uses hard coal. Coal is delivered by ship to the special-purpose Port of Plomin and transported from the port to the plant's coal storage facilities.

The Plomin site was selected in part because of its proximity to the former coal-mining area of Labin and because of its access to maritime transport and water resources. HEP has also identified the availability of suitable terrain and existing transport infrastructure as factors in the choice of the location.

Historically, the area was associated with the Raša coalfield. Scientific research has examined the environmental characteristics of the high-sulfur coal historically mined in the area and the effects associated with coal combustion at Plomin.

=== Cooling and water supply ===
The plant uses seawater from the Adriatic Sea for cooling.

HEP identifies Bubić Jama as the source of raw water used for the plant's water-treatment system. Water used in the steam cycle is treated and demineralized.

=== Auxiliary facilities ===
The two units use a number of common auxiliary systems, including:

- the special-purpose Port of Plomin;
- coal transport and storage;
- raw-water supply;
- demineralized-water preparation;
- cooling systems;
- auxiliary-fuel systems;
- treatment of technological, stormwater and sanitary wastewater;
- transport and storage of slag, ash and waste sludge; and
- the 340 m chimney.

== Environmental controls ==
Block B is equipped with systems for controlling atmospheric emissions. HEP's environmental documentation describes flue-gas desulfurization and dust-removal equipment at the unit.

In 2014, HEP and Alstom announced a contract for the construction of a selective catalytic reduction (SCR) system for nitrogen-oxide removal at Plomin 2.

The SCR system was commissioned during the 2017 modernization of Block B.

In 2016, the Croatian Ministry of Environmental Protection and Nature completed the procedure for issuing an integrated environmental permit covering the Plomin units. The permit established conditions and emission limits relating to air, water, sea and soil, as well as noise and other environmental requirements.

The Croatian environmental authority currently lists a procedure for amendments to the environmental-permit conditions for TE Plomin 2. The procedure was opened in 2025 following an application by HEP Proizvodnja.

== Electricity generation ==
Plomin has historically been one of HEP's thermal generating facilities. HEP reported combined annual average production of approximately 2.1 TWh from the two Plomin units in the period preceding the 2016 environmental-permit decision.

HEP's 2013–2014 sustainability report records 1,441 GWh of electricity generation from TE Plomin in 2014.

HEP's 2015 annual report records 1,295 GWh of generation from Plomin B in 2015.

The same period illustrates the distinction between installed capacity and actual electricity generation. The plant's generating output has varied according to maintenance, electricity demand, hydrological conditions and the operation of other generating units in Croatia.

Following the retirement of Block A in 2018, electricity generation at the site has been provided by Block B.

== Environmental regulation and safety ==
The Plomin facility is subject to Croatian regulations implementing European Union requirements for large combustion plants and industrial emissions.

The plant is also subject to Croatia's regulations concerning major-accident prevention for installations handling hazardous substances. HEP states that TE Plomin has a safety-management system under the Croatian major-accident-prevention regulation.

In July 2025, the Ministry of Environmental Protection and Green Transition extended the approval of HEP Proizvodnja's major-accident prevention policy for TE Plomin until 26 April 2029.

== Plomin C ==
Plomin C was a proposed third generating unit at the Plomin site. The project was intended to replace Block A and increase the site's generating capacity.

The proposed unit was planned as a new coal-fired generating unit with an electrical capacity of approximately 500 MW. An economic and technical study prepared for HEP examined a 500 MW Plomin C project and its implications for the Croatian electricity system.

In April 2013, HEP issued documentation for binding offers from qualified bidders in a process to select a strategic partner for the construction and operation of Plomin C. HEP identified Edison of Italy, KOSEP of South Korea and Marubeni of Japan as qualified bidders.

In May 2014, the Croatian Government declared the project "Reconstruction of the Plomin Thermal Power Plant – replacement of existing Block 1 with Block C for modernization and capacity increase" a strategic investment project of the Republic of Croatia.

=== Marubeni negotiations ===
HEP selected Japan's Marubeni as the preferred strategic partner for the project and subsequently entered negotiations concerning the construction and operation of the proposed unit.

During 2016, the proposed arrangement became the subject of scrutiny under European Union state-aid rules. Contemporary reporting stated that the European Commission's competition authorities had raised concerns about the proposed HEP–Marubeni arrangement.

The economic viability of the project and the future role of coal-fired generation were also subjects of public and political debate.

=== Local referendum ===
A consultative referendum concerning the use of coal as the principal fuel for Plomin C was held on 29 March 2015 in the city of Labin and the municipalities of Kršan, Pićan, Raša and Sveta Nedelja.

According to HEP's report on the referendum, overall turnout was 36.6 percent. Among those voting, approximately 94.5 percent opposed the use of coal as the main fuel for Plomin C. The local authorities stated that turnout was below the threshold required for the referendum to have legal effect.

Because the referendum was consultative and did not meet the applicable turnout threshold, its result did not legally determine the construction of Plomin C. It nevertheless formed part of the public debate surrounding the project.

=== Cancellation ===
The proposed Plomin C project was not constructed. In June 2016, Croatia's Minister of Economy Tomislav Panenić stated that the project would not be realized.

The decision ended the proposal to construct the planned 500 MW coal-fired unit. Block A subsequently ceased generation in 2018, while Block B remained the operating generating unit at the site.

== Future of the site ==
The future of the Plomin site has been discussed in the context of Croatia's energy transition and the planned reduction of fossil-fuel generation.

Croatian energy policy documents have considered nuclear energy among the options for future electricity generation. The revised Croatian National Energy and Climate Plan states that the commercialization of small modular reactors (SMRs) was not expected before 2035 in the assessment used by the plan.

In 2025, the Croatian Government announced the establishment of a working group to examine the legal and technical framework for the possible use of nuclear energy, including SMR technology.

Plomin has subsequently been mentioned publicly as a possible location for a future SMR. In December 2025, Croatian energy experts discussed the site as one potential location, with a possible timeframe after 2035. This remained a proposal under consideration rather than an approved construction project.

In 2025, the Croatian Minister of Economy stated that the suitability of Plomin for an SMR would have to be determined through expert analysis.

Accordingly, as of 2026, no nuclear power plant or SMR has been approved for construction at Plomin. The existing generating facility remains based on the coal-fired Block B.

== Ownership and operation ==
The Plomin power station is part of the HEP Group and is operated by HEP Proizvodnja.

The original joint-venture ownership of TE Plomin d.o.o. was divided equally between HEP and RWE. HEP became the sole owner after the joint-venture agreement expired in 2015, and TE Plomin d.o.o. was merged into HEP in August 2017.

== See also ==
- Hrvatska elektroprivreda
- Energy in Croatia
- Electricity sector in Croatia
- List of power stations in Croatia
- Plomin
- Plomin Bay
- Raša coal mine
- Nuclear power in Croatia
- Krško Nuclear Power Plant
