= Miljacka Hydroelectric Power Plant =

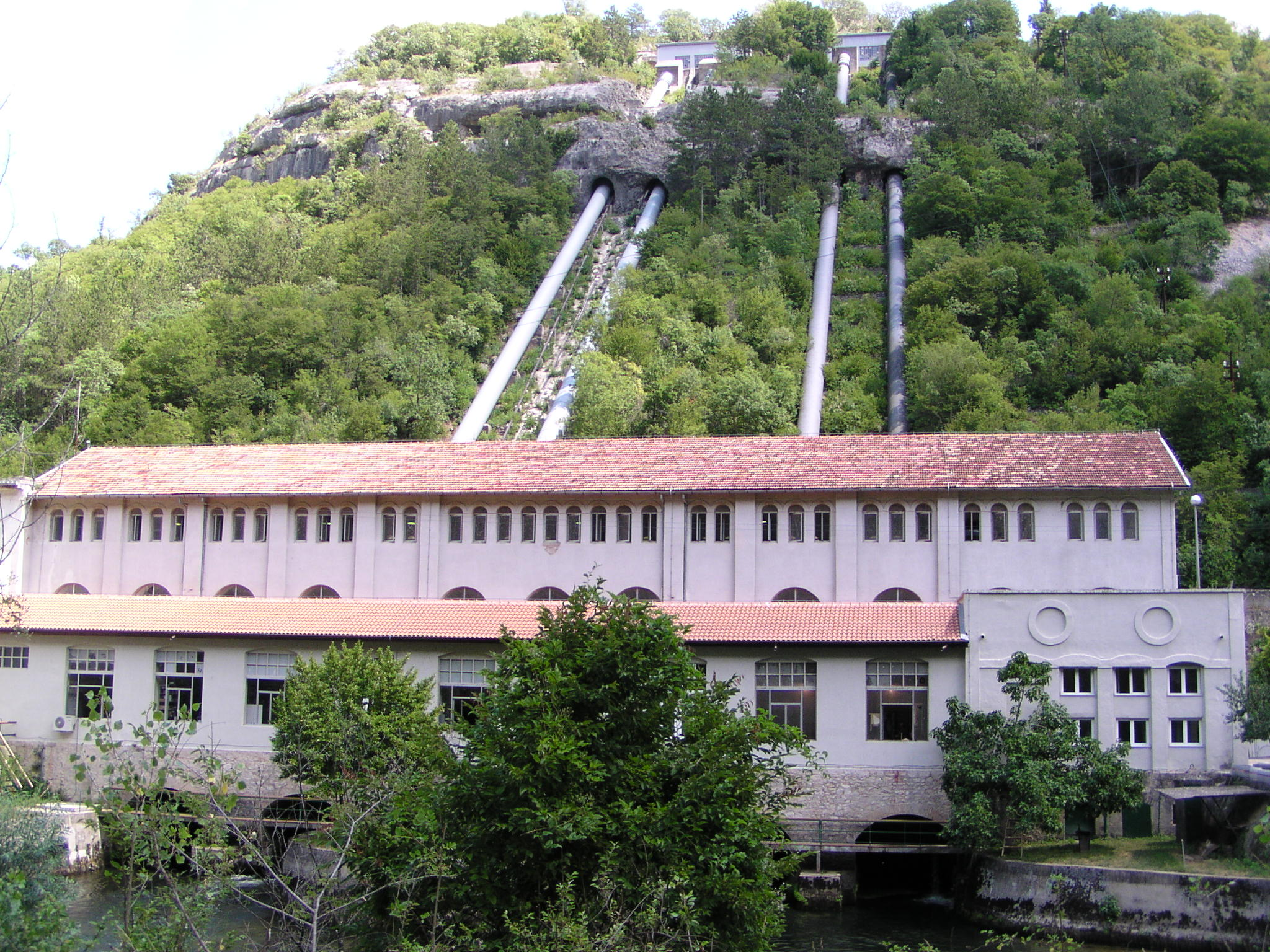

- Location within Croatia
- Interactive map of Miljacka Hydroelectric Power Plant
- Country: Croatia
- Location: downstream from Knin
- Coordinates: 44.001961°N 16.018702°E
- Purpose: Electricity generation
- Status: Operational
- Opening date: 1906
- Owner: Government of the Republic of Croatia

Dam and spillways
- Type of dam: Diversion dam

Reservoir
- Creates: Lake Brljan

Power Station
- Operator: JP " Hrvatska Elektroprivreda"
- Commission date: 1906
- Type: Low-pressure, run-of-the-river, diversion
- Hydraulic head: 102 m
- Turbines: 3x6,4 + 1x4,8 Francis
- Installed capacity: 24 MW
- Annual generation: 122 GWh

Miljacka Hydroelectric Power Plant is a hydroelectric power plant on the river Krka, located in Šibenik-Knin County, in central Dalmatia, Croatia.

The Miljacka Hydroelectric Power Plant, formerly called Manojlovac, is a relatively small high-pressure diversion power plant. It is one of the oldest in Croatia. It was built in 1906 on the Krka River, some 15 km downstream from the town of Knin. The power plant capacity in the beginning was 17.7 MW, and it supplied the power to the calcium carbide factory in Šibenik.

It is operated by Hrvatska elektroprivreda.

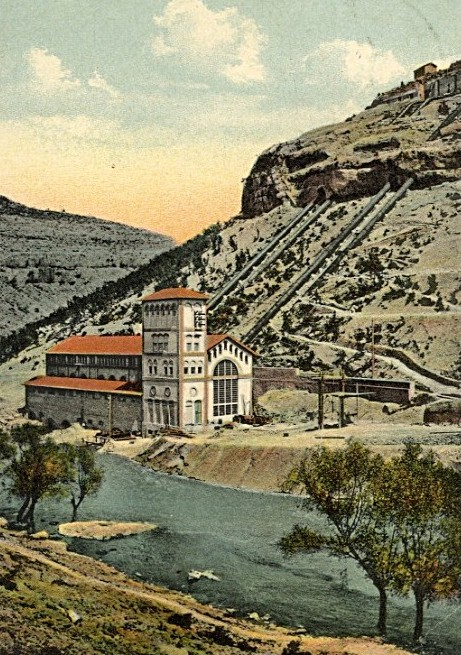
Miljacka Hydroelectric Power Plant in early 20th century

== The Krka River catchment Hydropower structures ==
- Golubić Hydroelectric Power Plant
- Small Krčić Hydroelectric Power Plant
- Miljacka Hydroelectric Power Plant
- Roški Slap Hydroelectric Power Plant
- Jaruga Hydroelectric Power Plant

== See also ==
- Krka
- Knin
- Oklaj
