= Krčić Hydroelectric Power Plant =

Power plant in Croatia

- Country: Croatia
- Coordinates: 44°02′33″N 16°14′08″E

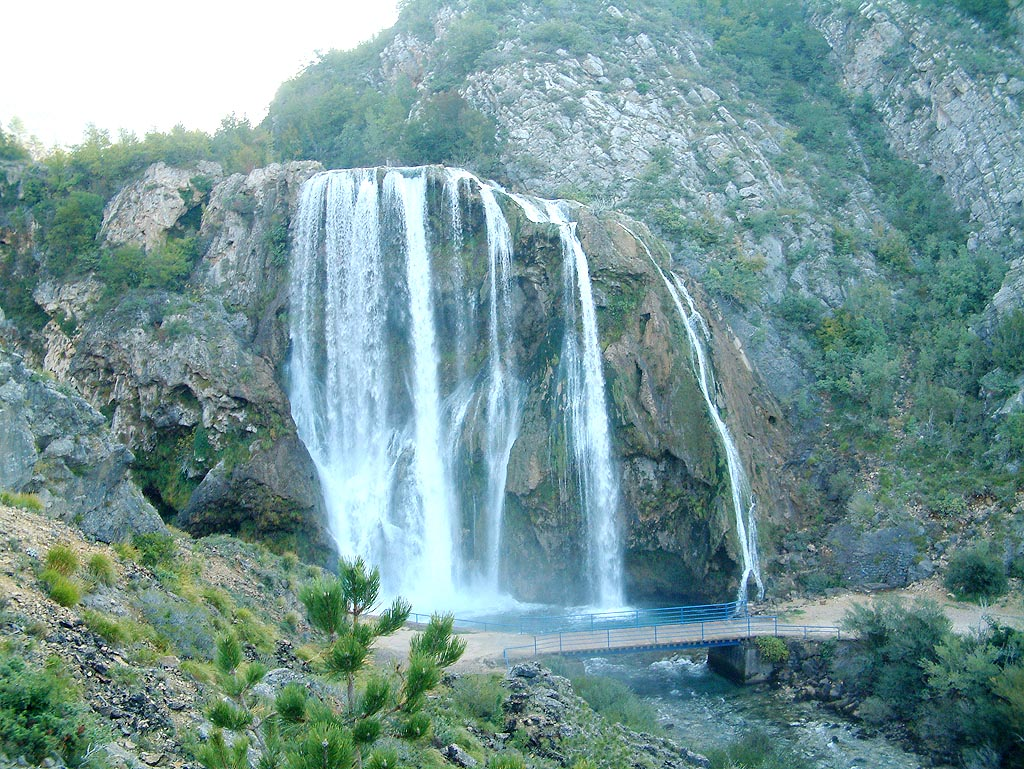
Krčić waterfall near the Krčić - HPP

Krčić Hydroelectric Power Plant is a hydroelectric power plant on river Krka, and Krčić intermittent stream, located in Šibenik-Knin County, in central Dalmatia, Croatia.

Krčić HPP is classified by its operator Hrvatska elektroprivreda as a very small power plant, as its installed power is 0.35 MW and produces between 1 and 2 GWh per year. Constructed in 1988, it is located on the Krka River spring, under the Topolje waterfall in the Kovačići village, approximately 4.5 km northeast from Knin.

== The Krka River catchment Hydropower structures ==
- Golubić Hydroelectric Power Plant
- Krčić Hydroelectric Power Plant
- Miljacka Hydroelectric Power Plant
- Roški Slap Hydroelectric Power Plant
- Jaruga Hydroelectric Power Plant

== See also ==
- Krka
- Knin
