= Senj Hydroelectric Power Plant =

- Country: Croatia
- Coordinates: 44°56′31″N 14°55′58″E

Power generation
- Nameplate capacity: 216 MW

Senj Hydroelectric Power Plant is a large high-pressure diversion power plant harnessing the Lika and Gacka Rivers water in Croatia. Senj HPP has four turbines with a nominal capacity of 72 MW each having a total capacity of 220 MW.

It is operated by Hrvatska elektroprivreda.

Another unit of HE Senj is about to be built with the support of EU funds and HEP Croatian Energy Company. A construction on a billion dollar project is set to start in mid 2014 with completion dates around 2017 or 2018 at the latest.
