= Zakučac Hydroelectric Power Plant =

- Interactive map of Zakučac Hydroelectric Power Plant
- Country: Croatia
- Location: Zakučac, Croatia
- Coordinates: 43.4576°N 16.7016°E

Reservoir
- Creates: Zakučac

Zakučac Hydroelectric Power Plant

Zakučac Hydroelectric Power Plant is a large power plant in Croatia that has four turbines with a nominal capacity of 122 megawatts (164,000 hp) each having a total capacity of 488 megawatts (654,000 hp).

It is a high-pressure diversion plant located at the Cetina River mouth into the sea, near the city of Omiš.

It is operated by Hrvatska elektroprivreda.
