= Dubrava Hydroelectric Power Plant =

Hydroelectric power plant in Croatia

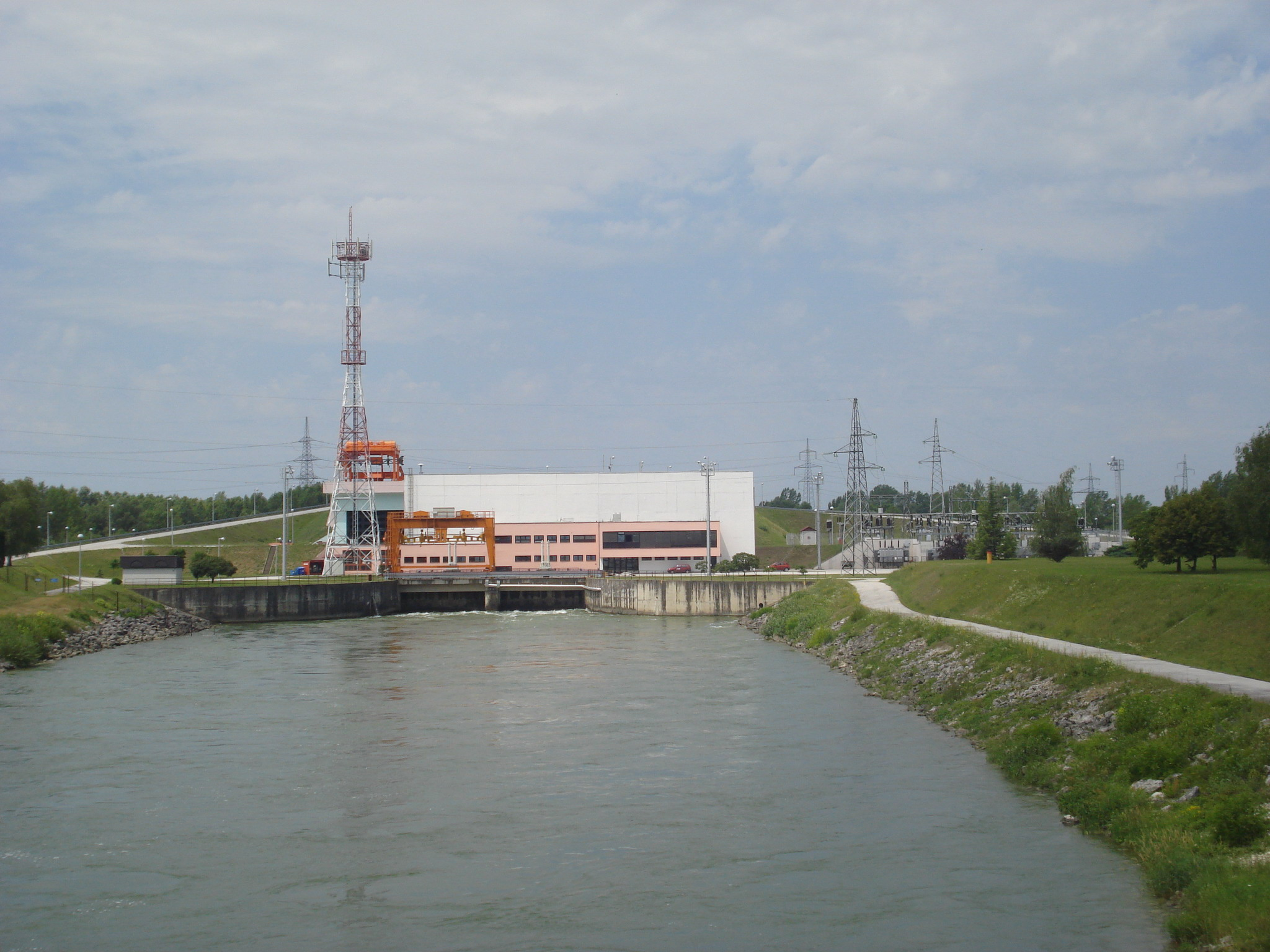
- Dubrava Hydroelectric Power Plant - east view
- Official name: Hidroelektrana Dubrava
- Country: Croatia
- Location: Donja Dubrava, Međimurje County
- Coordinates: 46°19′00″N 16°45′00″E
- Owner: Hrvatska elektroprivreda
- Operator: Hrvatska elektroprivreda

Power generation
- Nameplate capacity: 76 MW

External links
- Commons: Related media on Commons

Dubrava Hydro Power Plant is a large power plant in Croatia that has four turbines with a nominal capacity of 21 MW each, amounting to a total capacity of 84 MW.

== Overview ==
The power plant, which uses Lake Dubrava as its reservoir, was completed in 1989. It is located near the village of Sveta Marija in Međimurje County, not far from Donja Dubrava municipality seat, on the county's border with Varaždin County. The reservoir is also divided between the two counties.

It is operated by Hrvatska elektroprivreda.
