= Velebit Pumped Storage Power Plant =

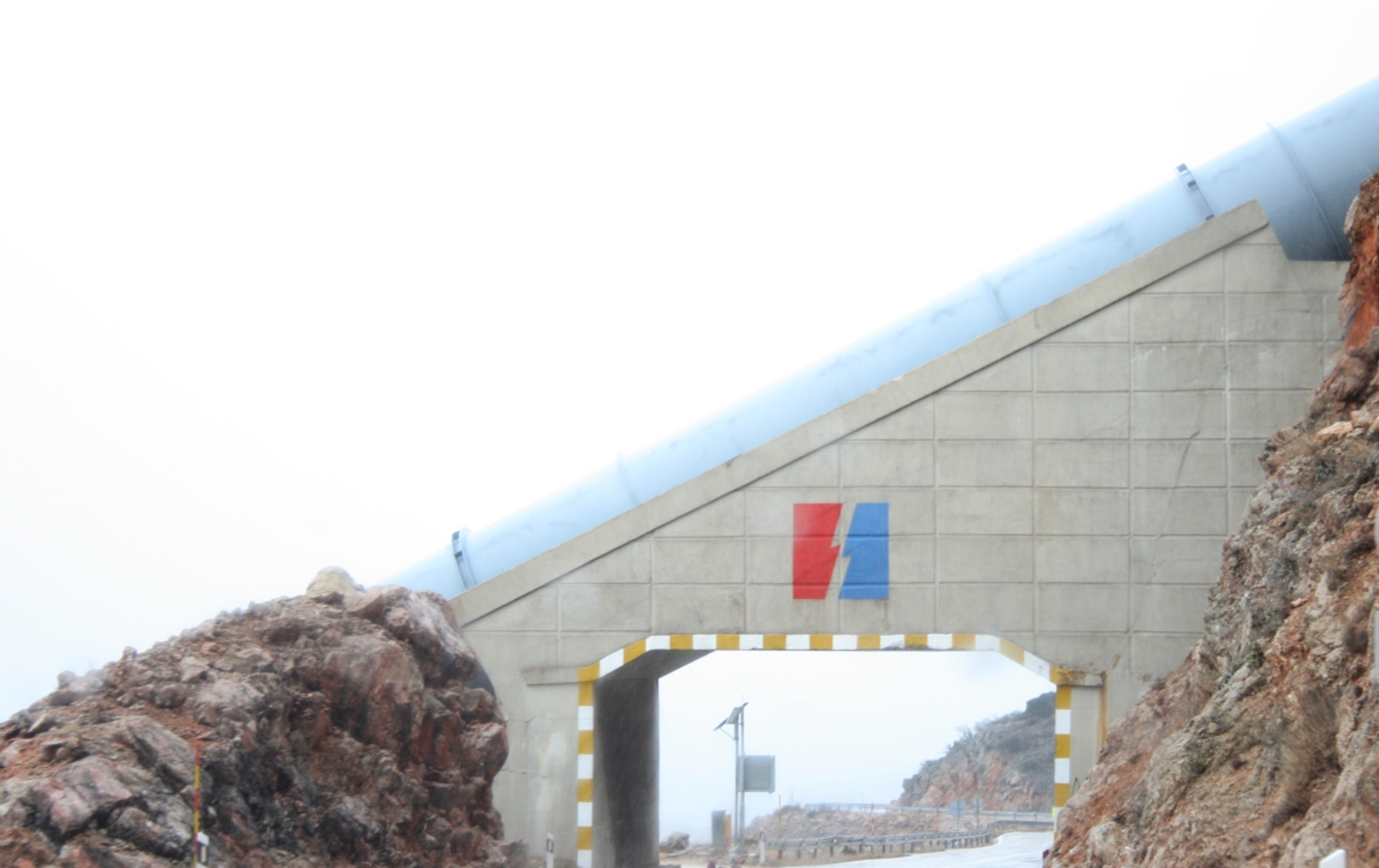
- Power station's pipe passes over the D27 road.
- Interactive map of Velebit Pumped Storage Power Plant
- Official name: Reverzibilna hidroelektrana Velebit
- Country: Croatia
- Location: Obrovac, Zadar County
- Coordinates: 44°12′29″N 15°45′13″E
- Status: Operational
- Construction began: 1978
- Opening date: 1984
- Owner: Hrvatska elektroprivreda
- Operator: Hrvatska elektroprivreda

Upper reservoir
- Creates: Štikada

Lower reservoir
- Creates: Razovac

Power Station
- Pump-generators: 2
- Installed capacity: 276 MW
- Annual generation: 467.5 GWh

Velebit Pumped Storage Power Plant (Croatian: Reverzibilna hidroelektrana Velebit) is a pumped-storage power plant in Croatia that has two turbines with a nominal capacity of 138 megawatts (185,000 hp) each, having a total capacity of 276 megawatts (370,000 hp). As of 2015, it was one of three operational pumped-storage power plants in Croatia.

The plant was designed by Elektroprojekt, Projektni Biro and Geoexpert, and constructed by Industrogradnja, Konstruktor, Hidroelektra, Pomgrad and Geotehnika.

== Turbines ==
- type: single-stage turbine-pump
- units: 2
- turbine design head: 517 metres (1,696 ft)
- design pumping head: 559 metres (1,834 ft)
- turbine rating: 140 megawatts (190,000 hp)
- installed discharge: - turbine (2x30 cubic metres per second (1,100 cu ft/s)), - pump (2x20 cubic metres per second (710 cu ft/s))

== Sources ==
- Kosović, Saša. "Reverzibilna hidroelektrana Velebit" [Velebit Pumped Storage Power Plant] (in Croatian). University of Rijeka.
- http://www.koncar-ket.hr/dokumenti/rhe-velebit-zamjena-opreme-sust-%20uprav.pdf (in Croatian)
- http://www.pbs.hr/index.php?option=com_content&task=view&id=9&Itemid=4 (in Croatian)
- http://www.koncar-ket.hr/dokumenti/Numericka%20zattita%20motor%20generatora%20u%20RHE%20Velebit.pdf (in Croatian)
- http://www.ie-zagreb.hr/clanci/clanciPDF/2003HKCigre/A1-12.pdf (in Croatian)
- http://www.gradri.hr/dokumenti/pgit/15-Okna.pdf (in Croatian)
