= Jaruga Hydroelectric Power Plant =

Hydroelectric power plant in Dalmatia, Croatia

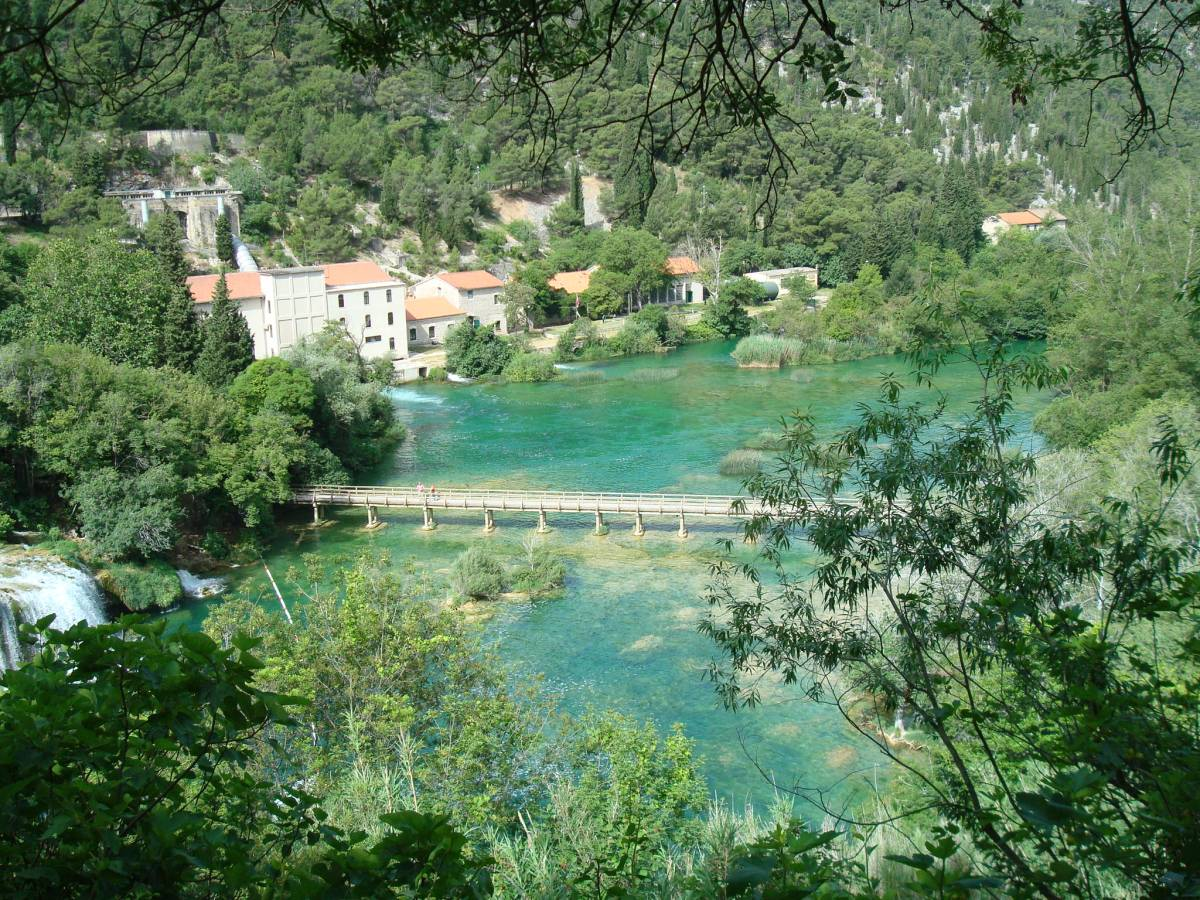
- Country: Croatia
- Coordinates: 43°48′19″N 15°57′43″E

Power generation
- Nameplate capacity: 5.4 MW

External links
- Commons: Related media on Commons

The Jaruga Hydroelectric Power Plant is a hydroelectric power plant near Skradinski Buk waterfall on the Krka River in central Dalmatia, Croatia. It is located within the Krka National Park.

Built in 1895, the Krka–Šibenik system was one of the first complete polyphase alternating current system of electricity production, transmission, distribution and consumption. It was used to power street lighting, private homes, flour and oil mills, a pasta factory, theaters, cafes, and hotels. The system is recognized as one of the IEEE Milestones.

The 1903 successor to the initial plant, known as Jaruga 2, is one of the world's oldest power-generating facilities still in operation. The small hydroelectric plant's current capacity is 7.3 MW, generating an average of 35 GWh annually.

== History ==
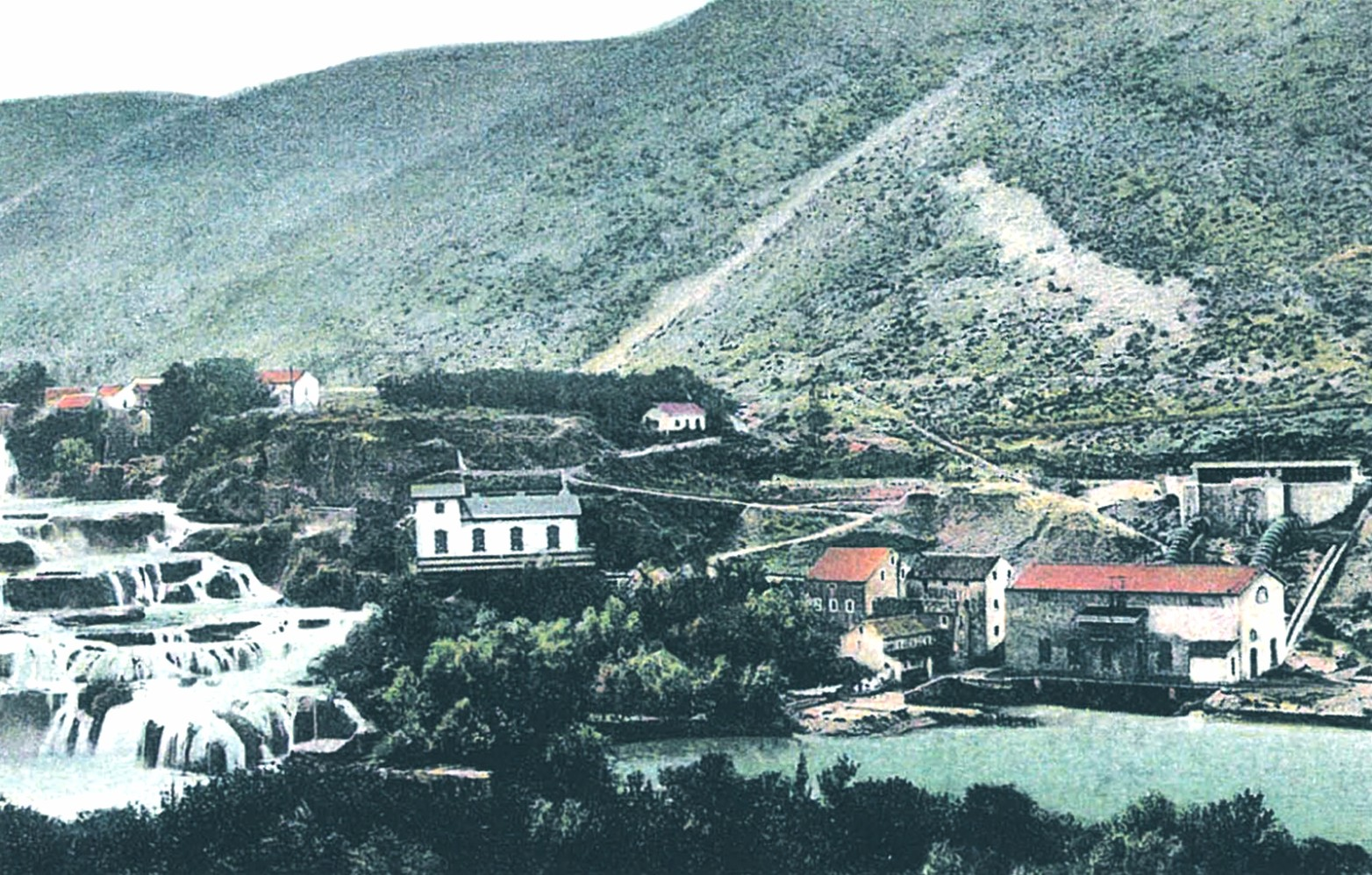
Jaruga 1 (left) and Jaruga 2 (right) sometime after 1903

In today's Croatia, before the Krka–Šibenik system, Županja (1880), Pula (1880), Đurđenovac (1881), Vodnjan (1882), Belišće (1884), Zagreb (1886), Lipik (1894) had their first, small industrial DC generators powered mainly by steam engines. A 662 kW direct current hydroelectric plant powered a cotton factory in Duga Resa since 1884, a direct current steam-powered system operated in Rijeka since 1885, a private and public direct current 22 kW power plant was set in operation in 1890, and soon replaced by a steam-engine single-phase alternating system with three 120 kVA generators powered engines, cranes and lights in the Port of Rijeka since 1892. Čakovec was the first to get public lighting, in 1893. Ports of Dubrovnik and Zadar got their first temporary electric lighting as early as 1875, during the visit of Franz Joseph I of Austria. Globally, long-distance transmission was demonstrated in London in 1883 and Turin, Italy, in 1884. The 1890 Ames Plant was among the first hydroelectric alternating current power plants. The first three-phase transmission was established in 1891 in Frankfurt, Germany (175 km); the Tivoli to Rome transmission was completed in 1892; the alternating Westinghouse system was built for the 1893 Chicago World Exposition. Although the original Adams Power Plant at Niagara Falls, with three two-phase generators, began operation three days before the Krka plant, it was not connected to its remote transmission system until 1896.

=== Jaruga 1 ===
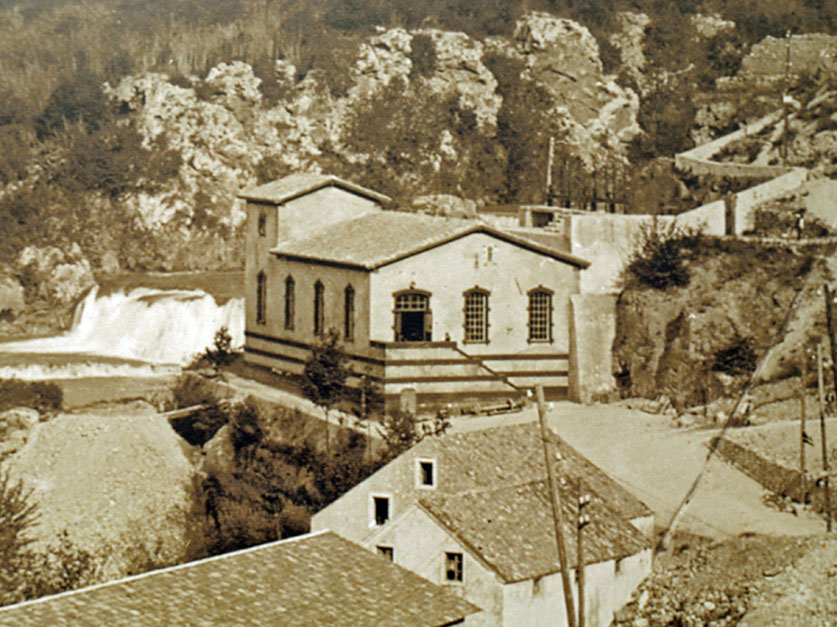
HPP Krka in ca. 1900

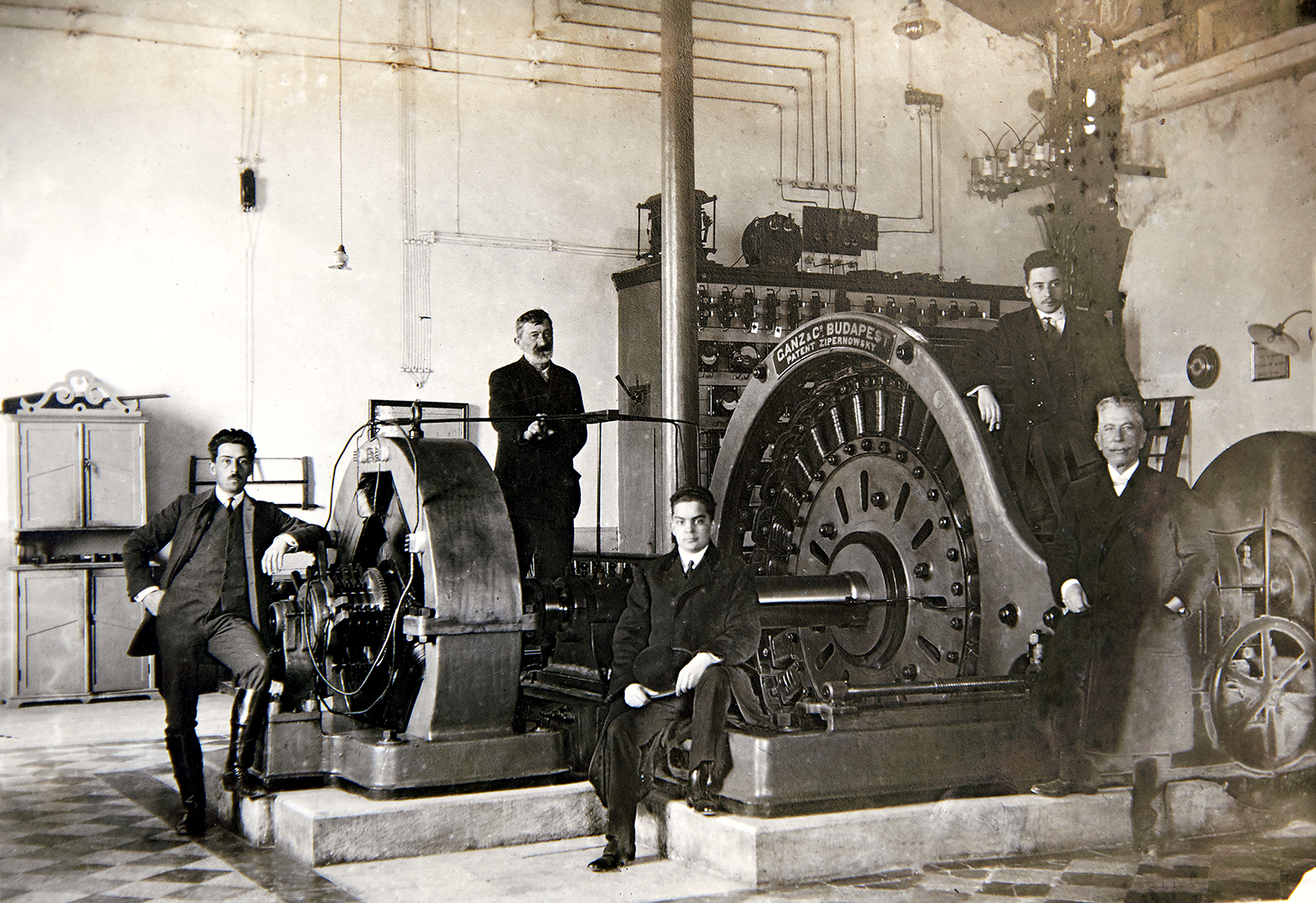
HPP Krka generator room in ca. 1895. Vjekoslav Meichsner is on the right, Ante Šupuk is second from the left.

The Krka Electric Power Plant (full name in Croatian: Prva povlaštena električna centrala u Dalmaciji "Krka" Ante Šupuk i sin), later named Jaruga 1, was the first plant built on the river. In December 1892, Vjekoslav Meichsner received a permit to build a new house on the Krka, intending to construct a hydroelectric power plant (HPP) within it. He was granted a concession for water use from the river in December 1893 and in June 1895 founded a company with the mayor of Šibenik Ante Šupuk and his son Marko. After sixteen months of construction, the power plant and its 11.5 km (7.1 mi) long transmission line with distribution via 6 transformers began operation on 28 August 1895.

The Hungarian company Ganz, a pioneer in two-phase systems across Europe, was one of the initiators of this development.

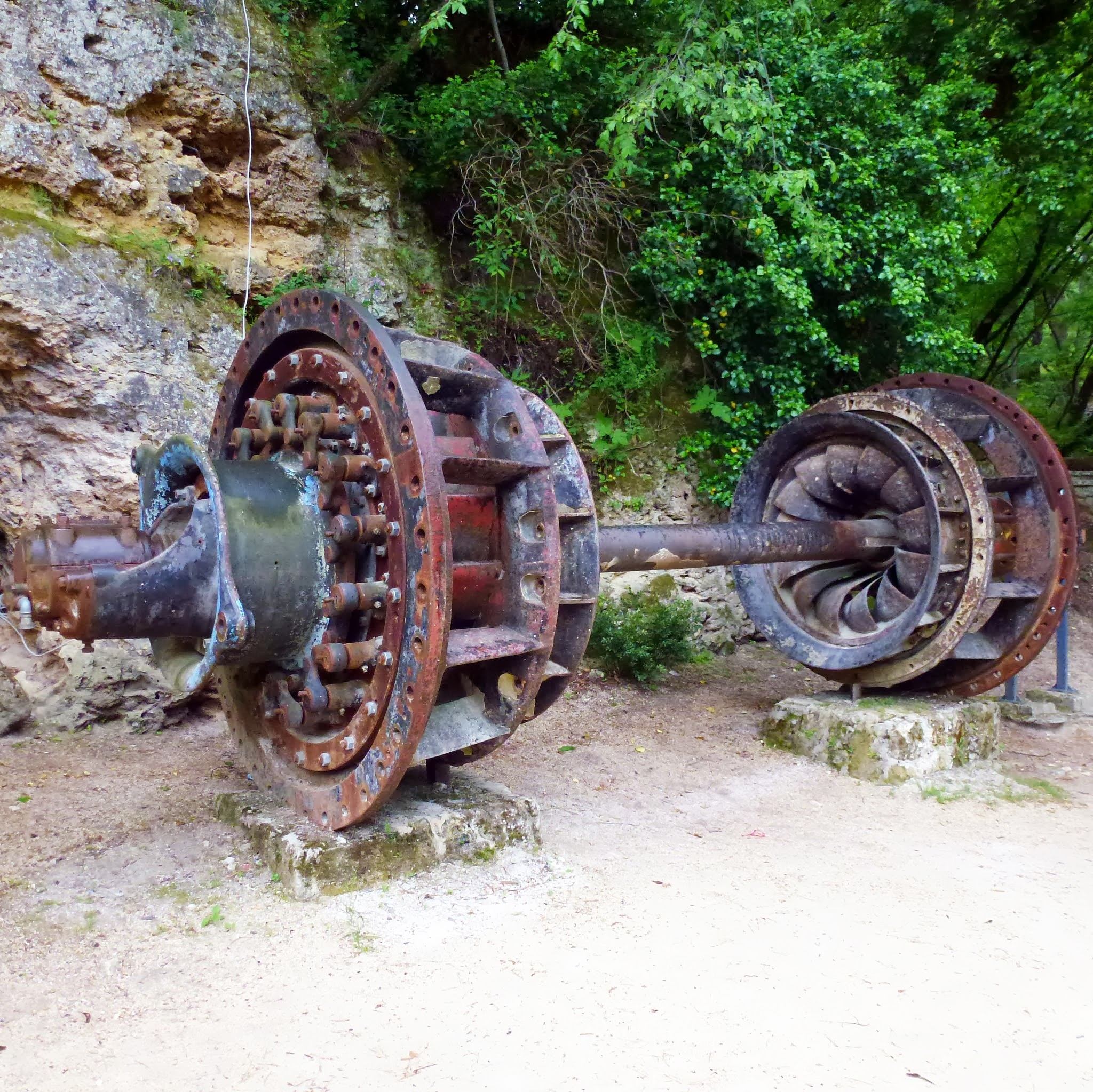
Old turbine from HPP Krka

The plant had an underwater section for turbines and an upper section for the engine room and switching station. It used a single vertical Girard turbine. Despite a concession for 26 cubic meters of water per second, it was powered by 3.2 cubic meters, with a 10 m drop from an open-type water chamber above the building. It could generate 240 kW by a two-phase Ganz A2 generator with a nominal voltage of 3000 V at 42 Hz. In 1899, to increase the power generated for a nearby carbide factory, the other planned Girard turbine was added.

The transmission line was mounted on 360 wooden towers, which also carried a telephone line from the plant to Villa Meichsner that served as the first dispatch center. The distribution system in Šibenik consisted of two switching stations and six 3000/110 V transformers.

In the beginning, most electricity was used for street lighting and Šupuk's flour mills, as well as oil mills, a pasta factory, to which theaters, cafes, and hotels were added later on. Out of fear, few households installed electricity, and it was only around 1900 that a dozen more did so.

The old power plant was shut down in 1913 as a result of a 1901 contract with an Italian joint stock company that owned the new nearby powerplant, Jaruga 2; the water that the old plant used was redirected. At the start of World War I, Austro-Hungarian military authorities dismantled the old plant's equipment and melted its copper cables for wartime use.

The old power plant building no longer exists, but its foundations have been restored and the original turbine put on display. In 2013, IEEE Milestone plaques in Croatian and English were put on the remains of a wall. In 1995, Croatian Post released a stamp commemorating the plant. The Croatian national power company Hrvatska elektroprivreda (HEP) lists the opening event as its origin and marks the date.

=== Jaruga 2 ===
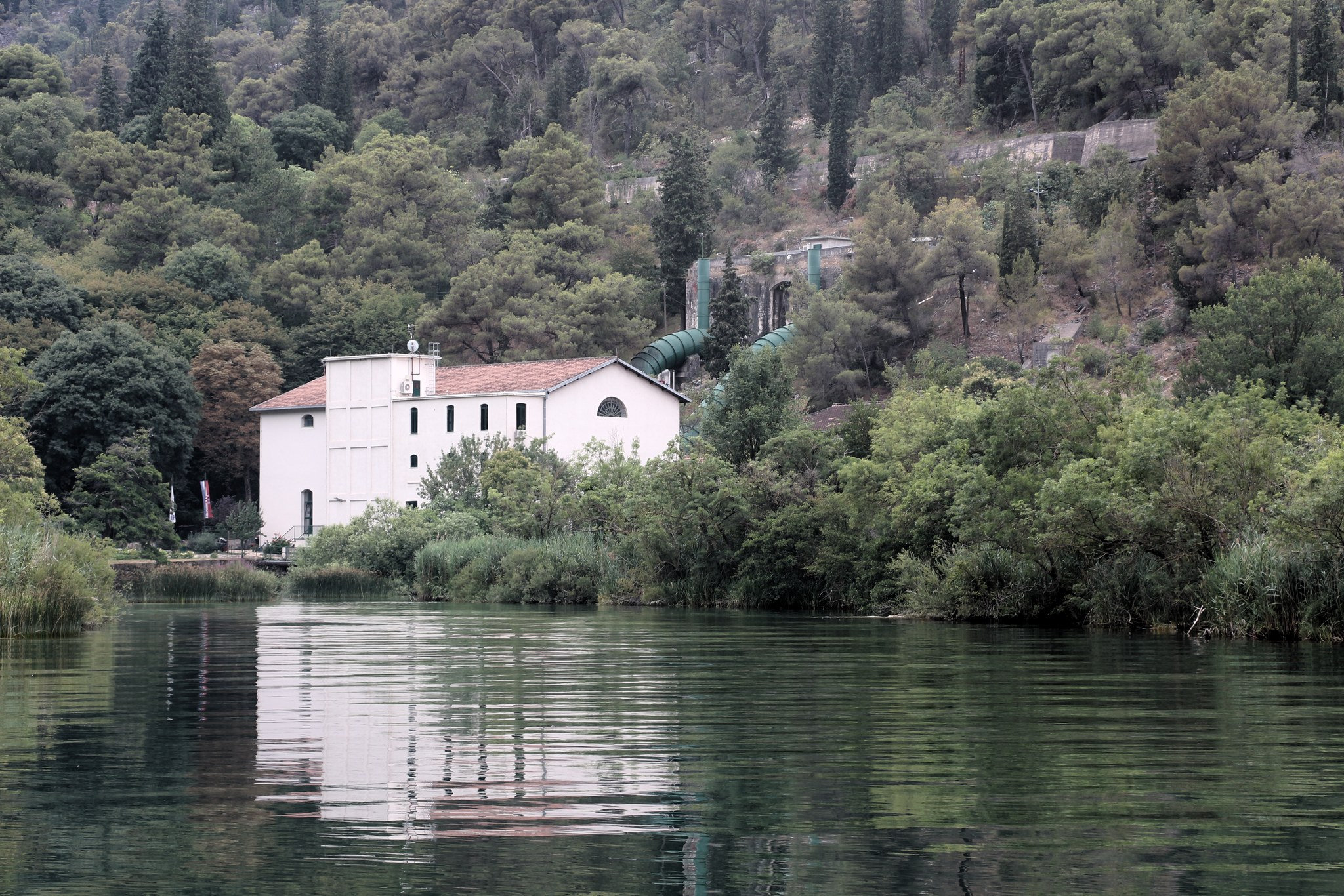
HPP Jaruga, still in operation

The Jaruga 2 is the last of five HPPs on the Krka River, utilizing a 26 m gross head of the total 46 m drop of Skradinski Buk. Water is diverted from the river and flows through a tunnel and a channel to an open-type water chamber, followed by two pressure pipelines that lead to Francis-type turbines.

Its construction began in 1901 and was completed by 1904, solely to provide more power for the furnaces of a new carbide and cyanamide factory in Crnica, Šibenik, which was built concurrently. Its two 42 Hz Ganz generators connected to Francis turbines could provide 3.6 MW each, given a flow rate of 15.5 m^{3}/s. Additional 4×50 mm^{2} copper lines (2×2-phase) and a 15000/6000/3000 transformer station were built.

Jaruga 1 and Jaruga 2 were reconstructed from 1902 to 1905 for a 3-phase system, enabling them to be connected to the 24 MW Manojlovac HPP in 1906 for operation in parallel. Manojlovac supplied the expanded carbide factory, which had some 30 furnaces. The new three-phase system had a 30 kV operating voltage, the highest in Europe at the time. The generators were connected directly to the transmission line, making them prone to atmospheric discharges, which were the cause of frequent winding burnouts.

The plant was refurbished in 1916, 1937, 1970, 1995 and 2003, but the basic concept of the plant has been retained.

To support a planned aluminum factory, Jaruga's generators were reconstructed and restarted in 1937. Two new replacement turbines by Voith from Sankt Pölten, Austria, were installed, which increased the capacity to 5.4 MW.

In 1947, the Jaruga HPP became part of the first Dalmatian electric power system, along with the nearby Manojlovac HPP, and HPP Kraljevac at the Cetina River. To supply this system, a new transmission line from Kraljevac to Lozovac and Zadar was built in 1948.

The generator was again restored in 1974 by Končar, and in 1995 the reconstruction of the engine room, and replacement of electrical installations and control systems took place. From 2002 to 2004, both production units were revitalized and modernized, increasing the turbine power from 2.94 to 3.65 MW and the rated power of generators from 4 to 4.5 MVA.

Currently, its capacity is 7.3 MW, generating an average of 35 GWh annually.

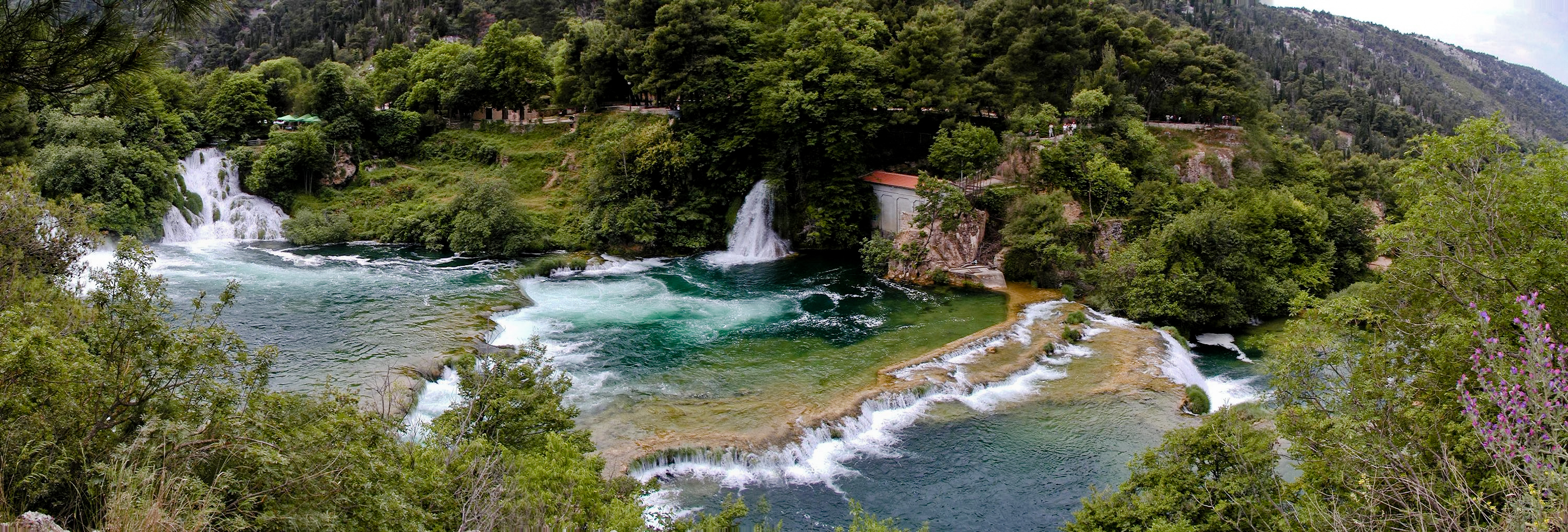
Water catchment at Skradinski buk

== Gallery ==
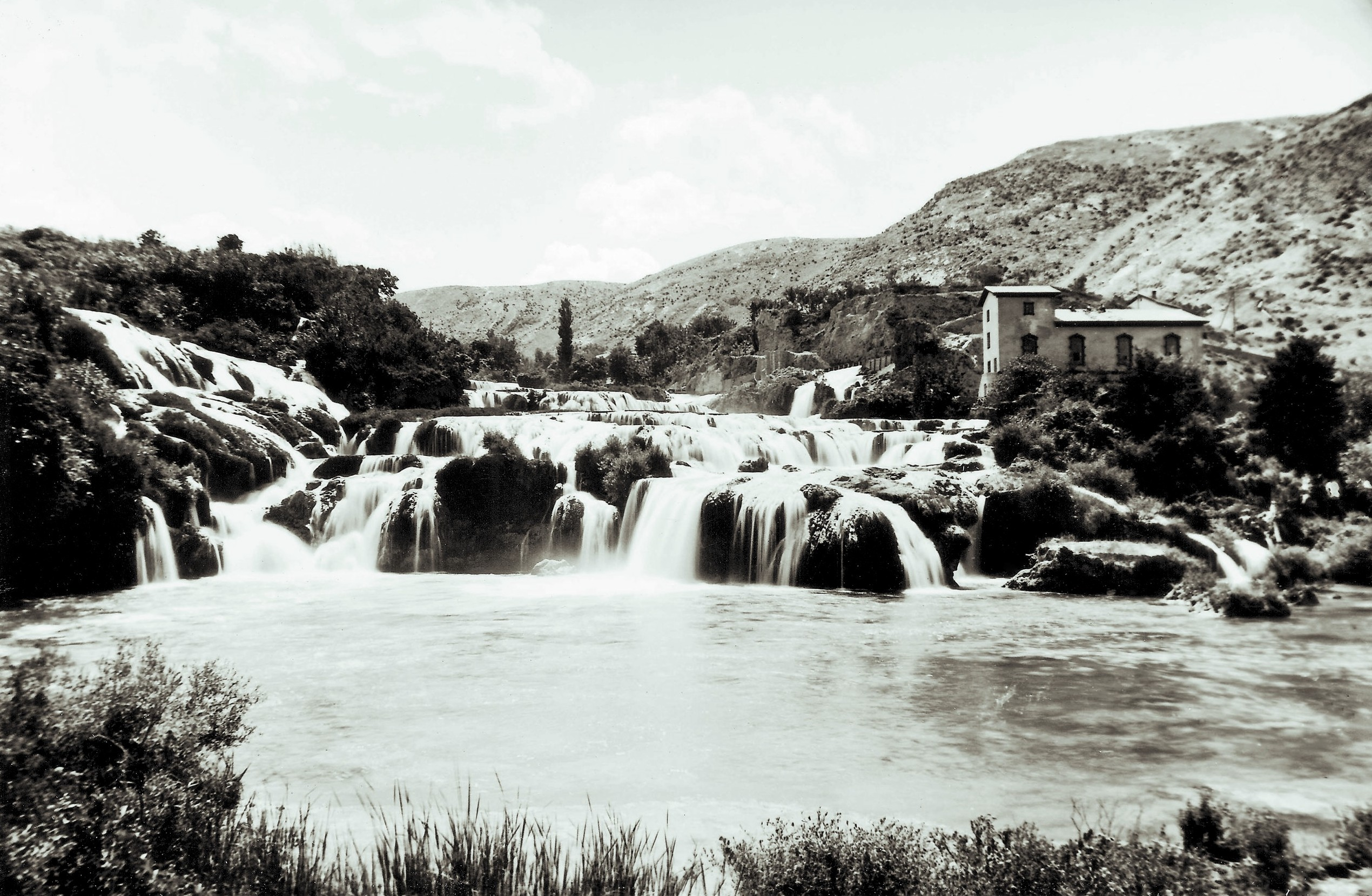
HPP Krka at Skradinski buk

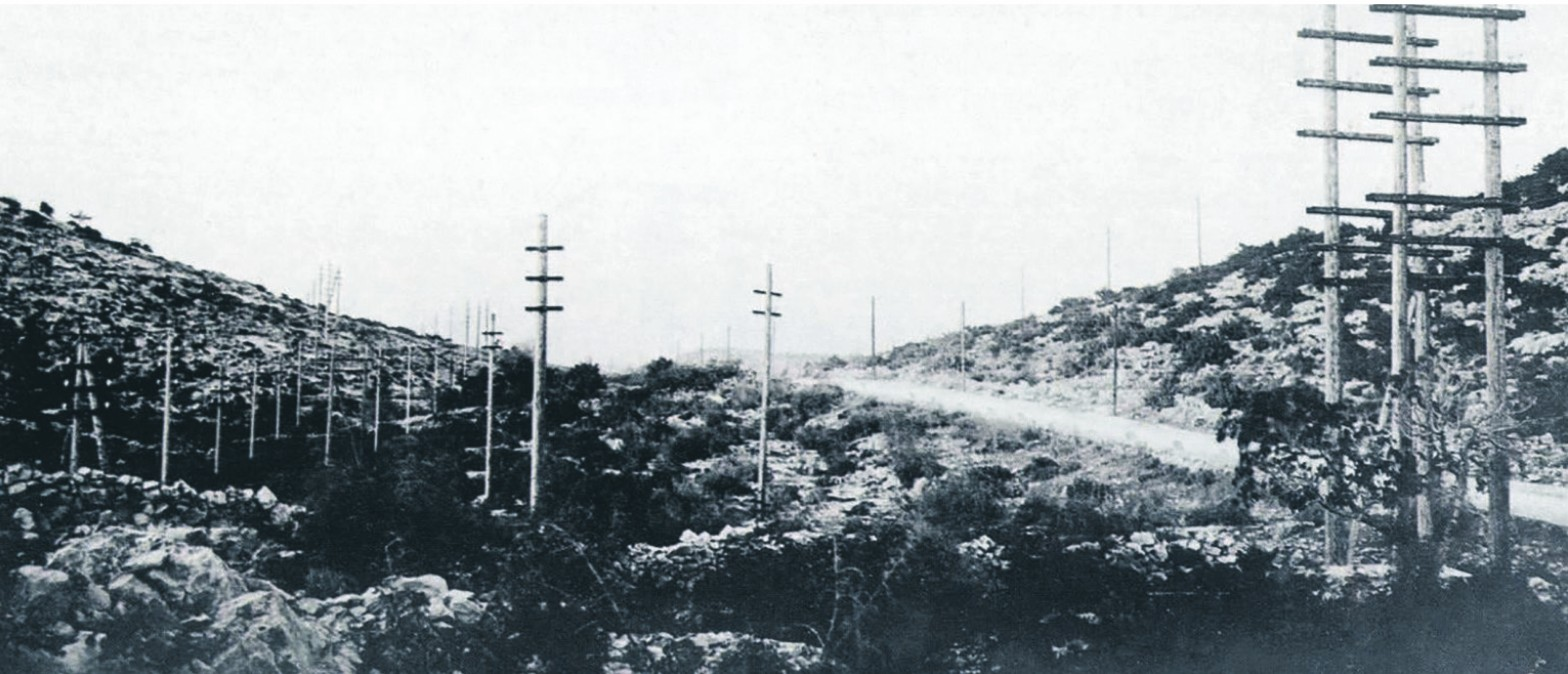
Old power lines in construction

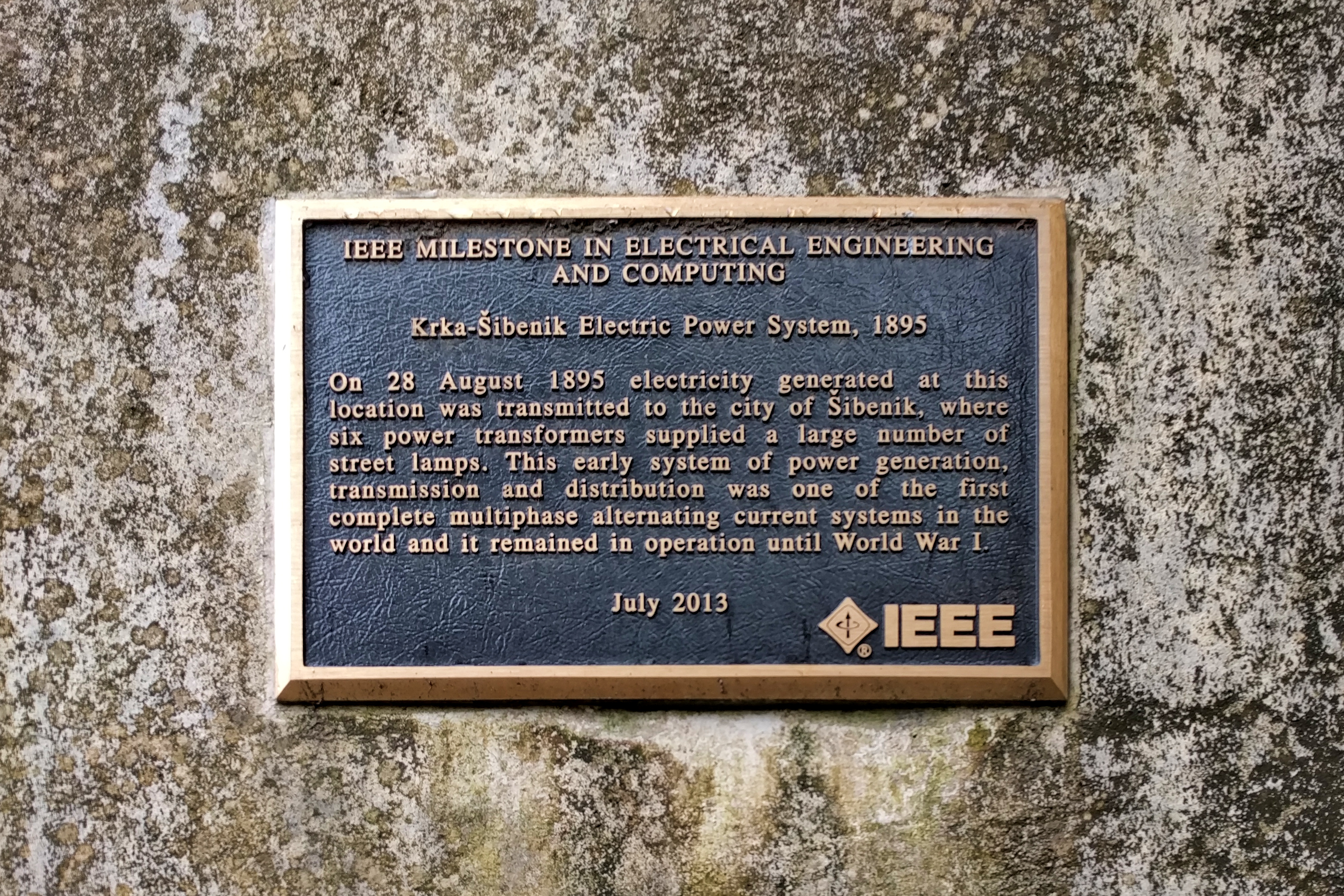
A 2013 plaque commemorating the opening of the plant

== The Krka River catchment hydroelectric power plants ==
- Golubić Hydroelectric Power Plant
- Krčić Hydroelectric Power Plant
- Miljacka Hydroelectric Power Plant
- Roški Slap Hydroelectric Power Plant
- Jaruga Hydroelectric Power Plant
