= Krka (Adriatic Sea) =

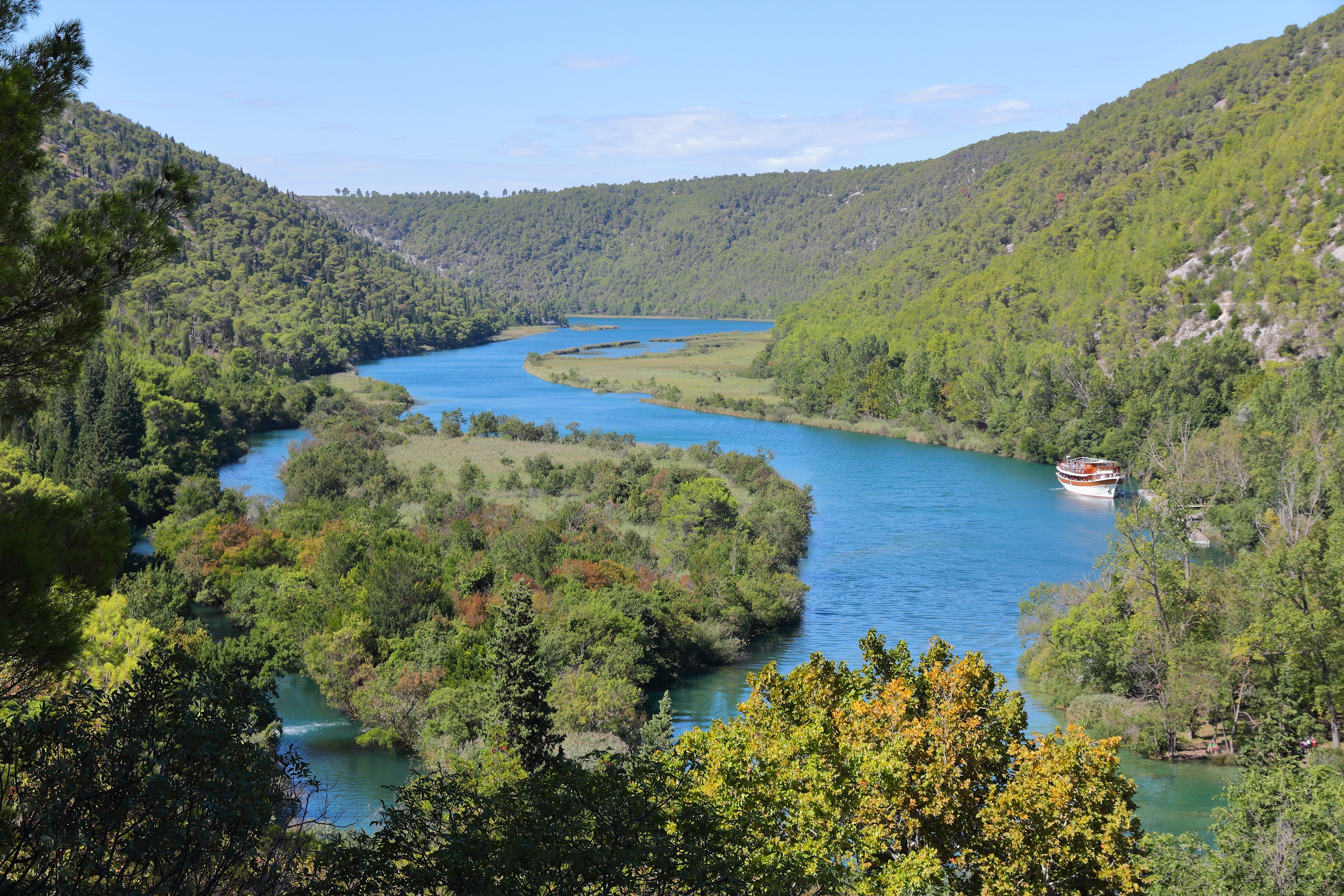

Location
- Country: Croatia

Physical characteristics
- Mouth
  - location: Adriatic Sea
  - coordinates: 43.7198°N 15.8526°E
- Length: 73 km (45 mi)
- Basin size: 2,088 km^{2} (806 sq mi)

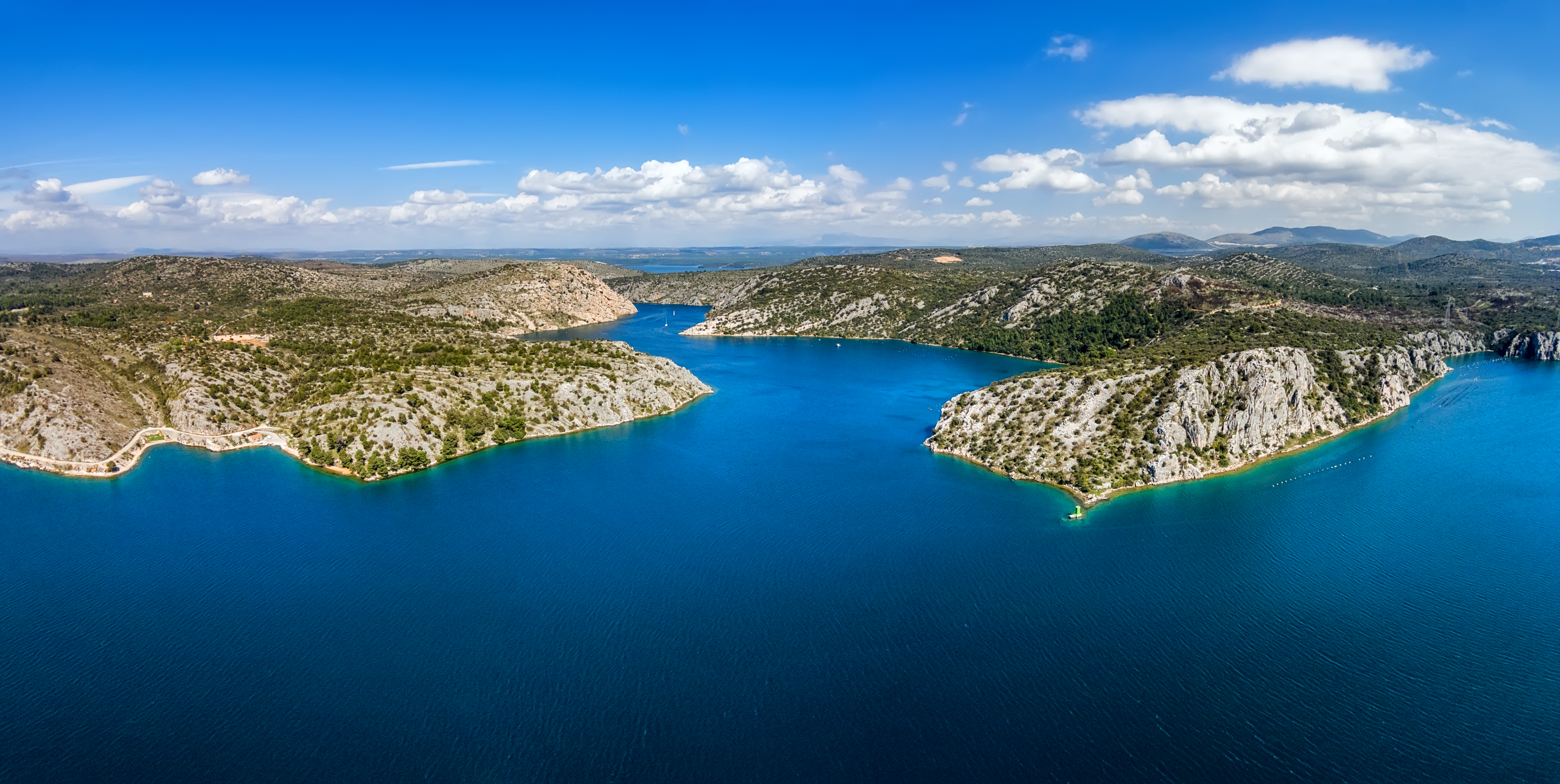
Krka River 30 March 2016

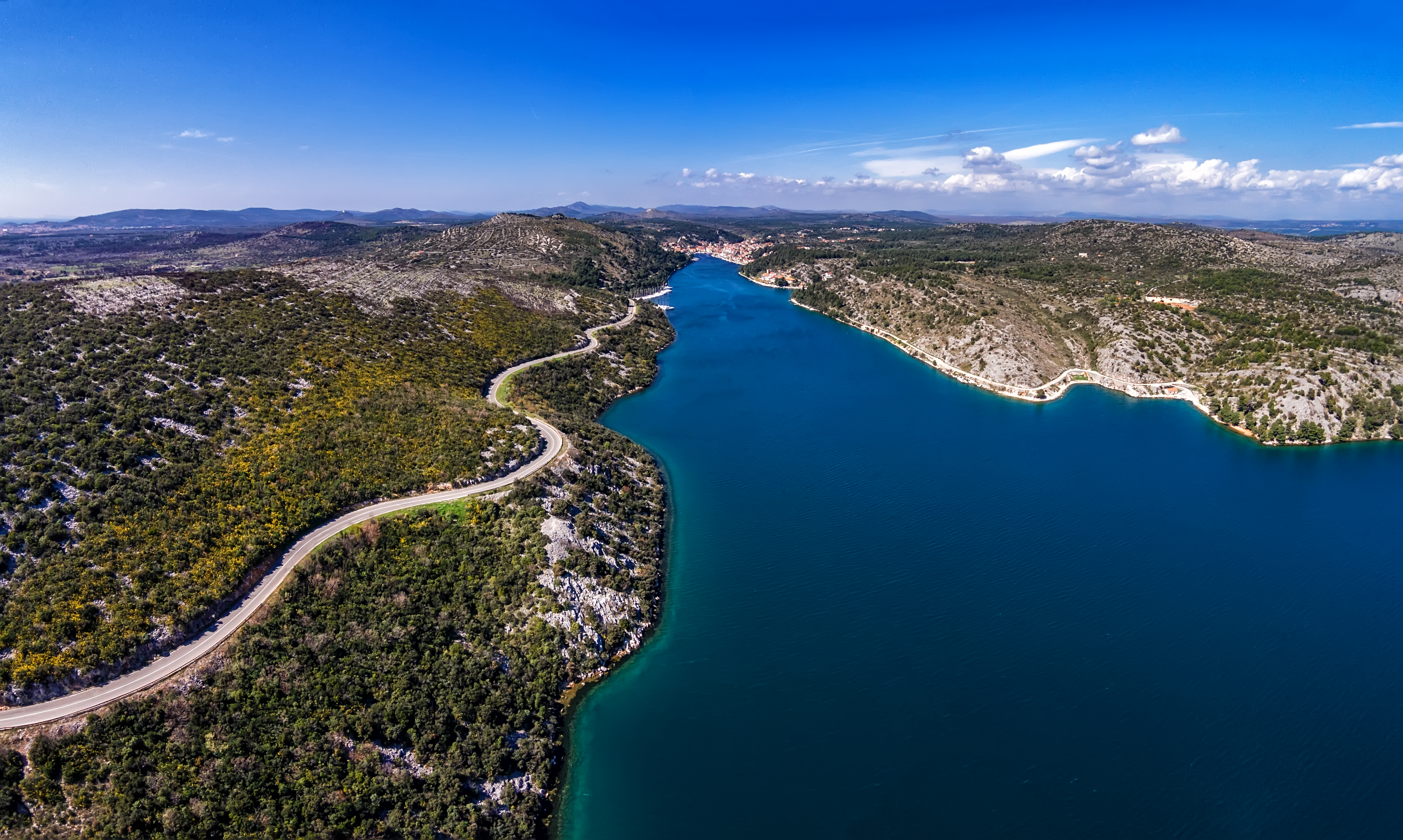
Krka River 30 March 2016

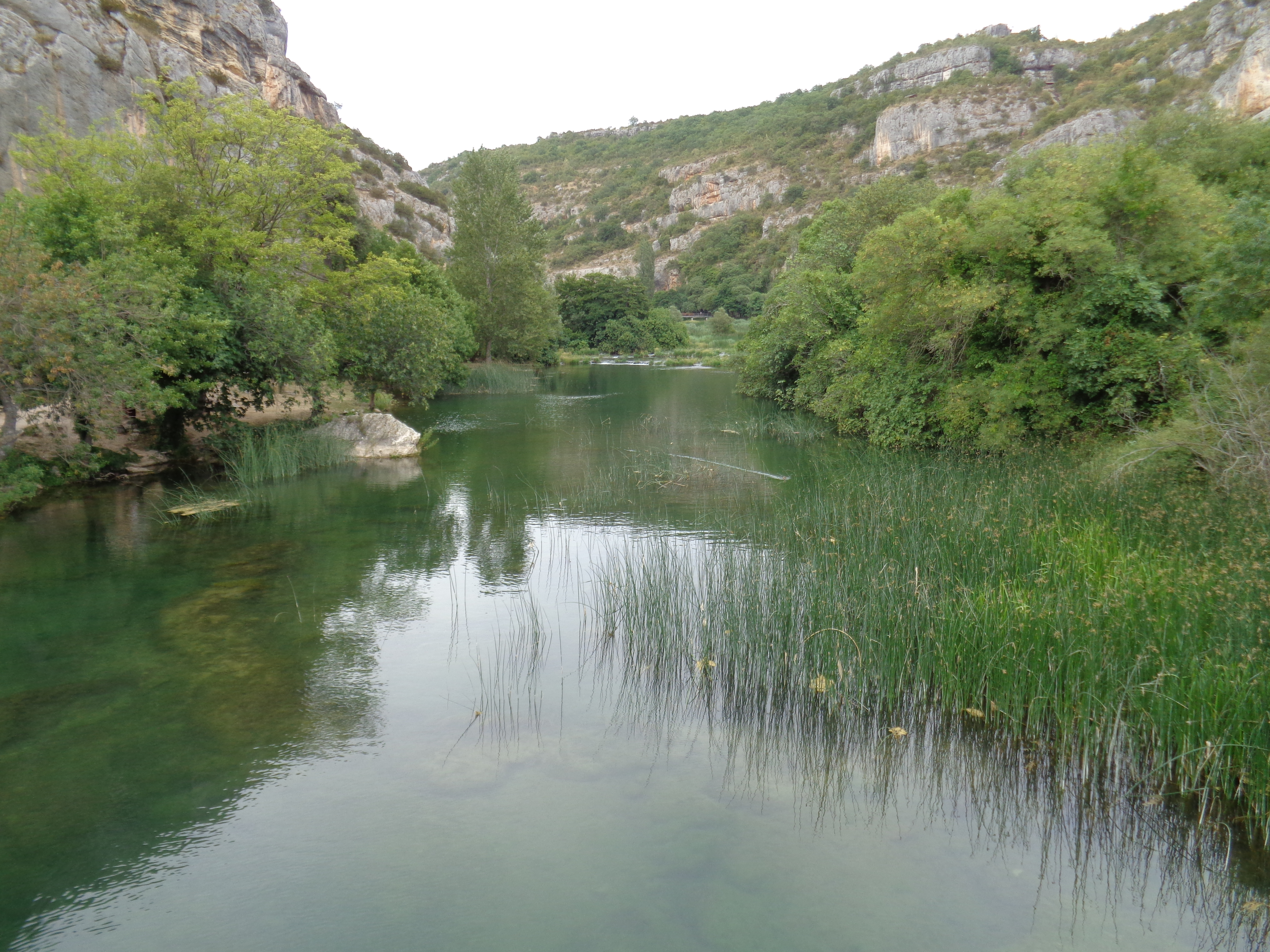
Krka River prior to "Roški Slap" waterfall

The Krka (pronounced [ˈkr̩ka]) is a river in Croatia's Dalmatia region, known for its numerous waterfalls. It is 73 km (45 mi) long and its basin covers an area of 2,088 km^{2} (806 mi^{2}). It was known in ancient Greek as Kyrikos, or maybe also as Catarbates (literally "steeply falling") by the ancient Greeks, it was known to the ancient Romans as Titius, Corcoras, or Korkoras.

== Course ==
The river has its source near the border of Croatia with Bosnia and Herzegovina, at the foot of the Dinara mountain. After meandering through the Krčić canyon, it enters the karst valley of Knin through the Krčić waterfall of 25 m (82 ft). At the foot of the second, called the Topoljski waterfall, of these is a spring in a cave with 150 m (490 ft) of passage. The river then flows through the valley, where it is fed by the Kosovčica on the left (from the nearby Kosovo polje) and the Orašnica and the Butižnica on the right, passing the Fortress of Knin between the last two on the way, and into the main canyon.

What follows belongs to the Krka National Park. The first waterfall there is the 6 m (20 ft) high Bilušića waterfall, which is followed by twice its height in cascades. They lead to the Brljansko lake with a waterfall in its middle, of nearly equal height. At the end of the second half of the lake begin the Manojlovački waterfalls, a series of waterfalls and cascades with a total elevation of 60 m (200 ft), half of which is from the last one. Here, on the right bank, lie the Roman ruins of Burnum. At the far end of the canyon are the ruins of the medieval castles of Nečven on the left and Trošenj opposite it. Beyond it is the Serbian Orthodox Krka monastery. Further down, an extensive cascade system ends in the 20 m (66 ft) high Roški waterfall. Still further, the river forms the 7 km (4.3 mi) Visovačko lake, with the Franciscan order Visovac Monastery on the island in the middle of the lake. The lake ends at the confluence of the Krka and its largest tributary, the Čikola. At that point, they form the Skradinski waterfalls, a long series with a total height of 45 m (148 ft).

The river is navigable from the sea up to this point. The river flows past the town of Skradin on the right, flowing into the 5 km (3.1 mi) wide Prokljansko lake, into which the Guduča river flows on the right. After that, the river empties into the 10 km (6.2 mi) long Bay of Šibenik, which is connected to the Adriatic Sea by the Canal of St. Anthony, at the Fortress of St. Nicholas.

== Development ==
This area is also the location of the first hydroelectric power station using alternate current in Croatia, the Jaruga Hydroelectric Power Plant. This plant started supplying power to the nearby city of Šibenik in 1895.

== Pollution ==
Parts of the Krka river were heavily mined during the Yugoslav Wars. As of 2016, many fields bordering the canyon between Visovačko lake and Prokljansko lake on the right bank, and between Nečven and Visovačko lake on the left bank, have yet to be demined. Tourist areas and paved roads are no longer affected.

== See also ==
- Jaruga Hydroelectric Power Plant
- Krčić Hydroelectric Power Plant
- Krka monastery
- Krka National Park
- Miljacka Hydroelectric Power Plant
- Roški Slap Hydroelectric Power Plant
- Visovac Monastery
