= Hrvatska elektroprivreda =

National power company in Croatia

- Industry: Electrical power industry
- Headquarters: Zagreb, Croatia
- Key people: Vice Oršulić (chair)
- Production output: 12.9 TWh (2018)
- Revenue: 1,162,000,000 (2018)
- Operating income: 14.56 billion HRK (2015)
- Net income: 1.94 billion HRK (2015)
- Total assets: 38.211 billion HRK (December 31, 2015)
- Total equity: 18.135 billion HRK (December 31, 2007)
- Number of employees: 11,018 (2018)
- Subsidiaries: HEP Proizvodnja d.o.o.; HEP Operator prijenosnog sustava d.o.o.; HEP Operator distribucijskog sustava d.o.o.; HEP Opskrba d.o.o.; HEP Trgovina d.o.o.; HEP Toplinarstvo d.o.o.; HEP Plin d.o.o.; APO d.o.o.; HEP ESCO d.o.o.; HEP Obnovljivi izvori energije d.o.o.; TE Plomin d.o.o.; Plomin Holding d.o.o.; HEP Odmor i rekreacija d.o.o.; CS Buško blato d.o.o.; HEP Nastavno obrazovni centar Velika; Program Sava
- Website: http://www.hep.hr/

Hrvatska elektroprivreda (HEP Group) is a national power company in Croatia which has been engaged in electricity production, transmission and distribution for more than one century, and with heat supply and gas distribution for the past few decades. HEP Group is organized in the form of a holding company with a number of daughter companies.

== History ==
HEP claims to be the oldest electric company distributing alternating current, tracing its foundation to 1895 when the first European power plant Jaruga Hydroelectric Power Plant was built, only three days after the Adams Power Plant at Niagara Falls.

== Structure ==
The parent company of HEP Group, HEP d.d., performs the function of HEP Group corporate management.

Production is delegated to two subsidiaries: HEP Proizvodnja d.o.o., which deals with a majority of generation facilities, and TE Plomin d.o.o., which is co-owned by HEP and RWE Power, and operates Plomin thermal power plant. HEP also owns 50% of Krško Nuclear Power Plant in Slovenia.

HEP Operator prijenosnog sustava d.o.o. (HEP OPS; English: HEP Transmission System Operator) and HEP Operator distribucijskog sustava d.o.o. (HEP ODS, English: HEP Distribution System Operator) are providers of public services of electricity transmission and distribution, respectively, for the needs of participants in the Croatian market.

HEP ODS is also responsible for supplying tariff customers, while supplying eligible customers (industry and businesses) falls under the jurisdiction of HEP Opskrba d.o.o.

Other business activities include: district heating (HEP Toplinarstvo d.o.o.), gas distribution (HEP Plin d.o.o.), energy efficiency (HEP ESCO d.o.o.), environmental protection with a focus on waste management (APO d.o.o.), renewable energy sources (HEP Obnovljivi izvori energije d.o.o.), education and training (HEP Nastavno-obrazovni centar) and leisure and recreation (HEP Odmor i rekreacija d.o.o.).

== See also ==
- Energy in Croatia
- European Network of Transmission System Operators for Electricity
