= Battle of Knin =

Part of World War 2 (1944)

- Part of World War II in Yugoslavia
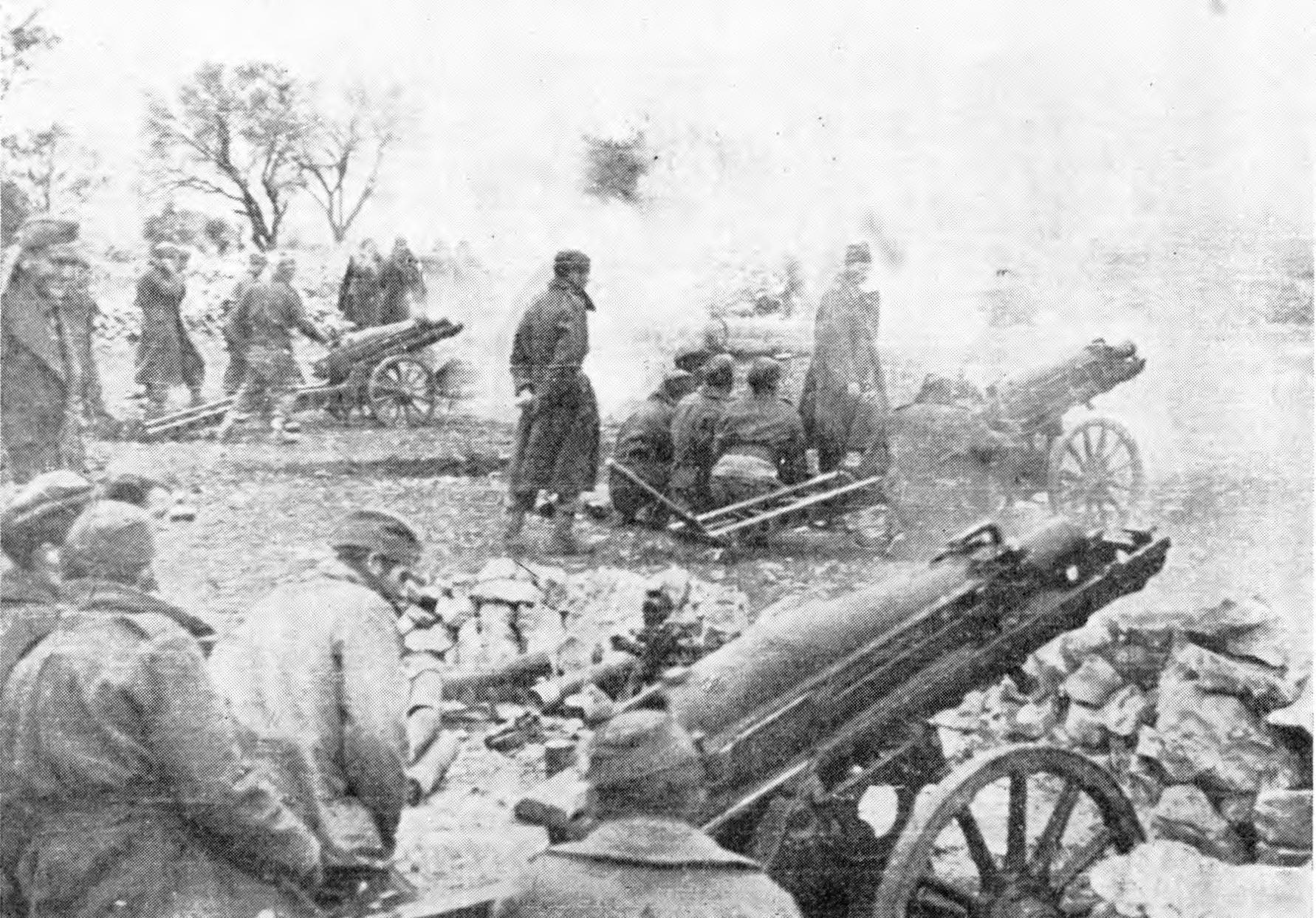
- Partisan artillery during the battle
Date	7 November – 9 December 1944
Location	North Dalmatia, Independent State of Croatia
Result	Yugoslav Partisans victory

Belligerents
Yugoslavia	Axis: (Nazi Germany) Germany; Chetniks; Independent State of Croatia

Commanders and leaders
Petar Drapšin	(Nazi Germany) Gustav Fehn; (Chetniks) Momčilo Đujić (WIA)

Units involved
8th Dalmatian Corps; 1st and 2nd Air Force Squadron; Balkan Air Force; Yugoslav Navy	(Nazi Germany) XV Mountain Corps; Dinara Division (Independent State of Croatia) 6th and 7th Ustasha Brigade, 2nd Battalion of the 3rd Croatian Home Defense Brigade

Strength
35,000 troops, 80 artillery guns, 25 tanks and 11 armored vehicles	20,000 troops, 75 field guns and 30 AA guns

Casualties and losses
677 killed; 2,439 wounded; 126 missing	6,555 killed or wounded; 4,285 captured

The battle of Knin (Serbo-Croatian: Kninska operacija) was a major Yugoslav Partisan operation during World War II in Yugoslavia launched by the 8th Dalmatian Corps from 7 November to 9 December 1944 with the purpose of destroying German, Ustaše and Chetnik formations in North Dalmatia and the city of Knin, then part of the Independent State of Croatia. It was the final part of the 8th Corps offensive for the liberation of Dalmatia which began on 12 September 1944. The Knin operation had three phases: Initial battles on approaches to Knin from 7 November to 25 November, main battle and liberation of Knin from 26 November to 4 December, and final battles and pursuit of retreating Axis forces to Otrić in Lika from 5 December to 9 December.

== Background ==
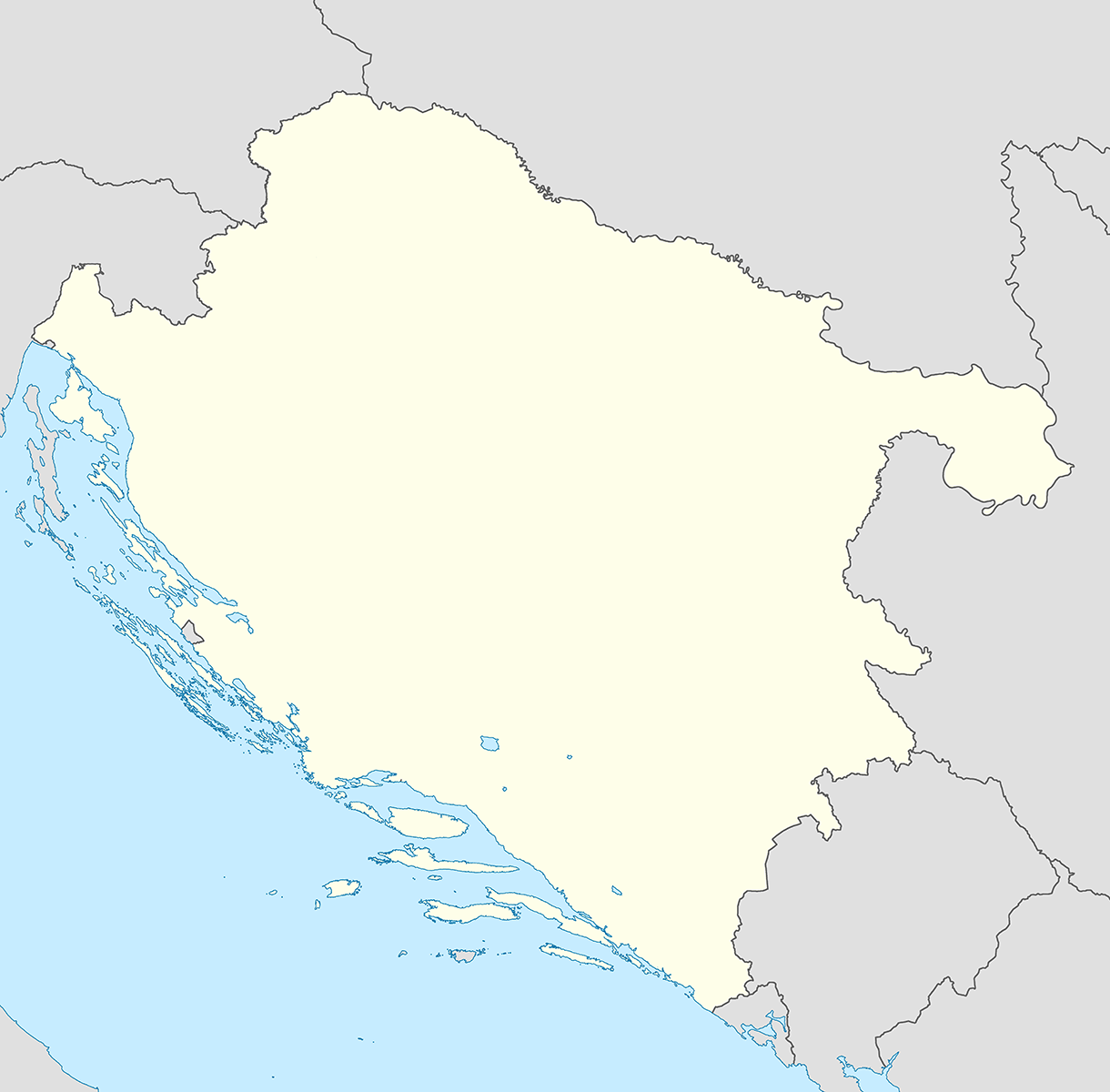
Location of Knin within the Independent State of Croatia

Following the liberation of Šibenik and Drniš, the forces of the 26th Division pursued the Germans towards Knin, but met fierce resistance south of the city. Soon the Command of the 8th Corps started grouping its forces for the attack on Knin. Since the Axis lost most of Dalmatia in the previous months, the Command expected that the German forces will leave Knin shortly after the attack. However, subsequent events showed that their estimates were not realistic. The XV Mountain Corps headquarters was ordered to hold Knin at all costs to stop the advance of 8th Corps towards Lika and Bosnia. The Germans also wanted to secure the right flank of their units fighting on the Syrmian Front and protect the retreating columns from Greece and Albania through Sarajevo and Banja Luka.

The motivations to capture the town of Knin was fourfold for the Partisans. By capturing Knin, the Partisans would ensure that:

- The Dalmatian region would be liberated.
- Partisan forces in Dalmatia would be able to link up with forces in Istria and Slovenia.
- Any withdrawal of Axis forces to Bihać would be prevented.
- Final remnants of Ustaše and Chetnik forces in Northern Dalmatia would be destroyed.

== Order of battle ==
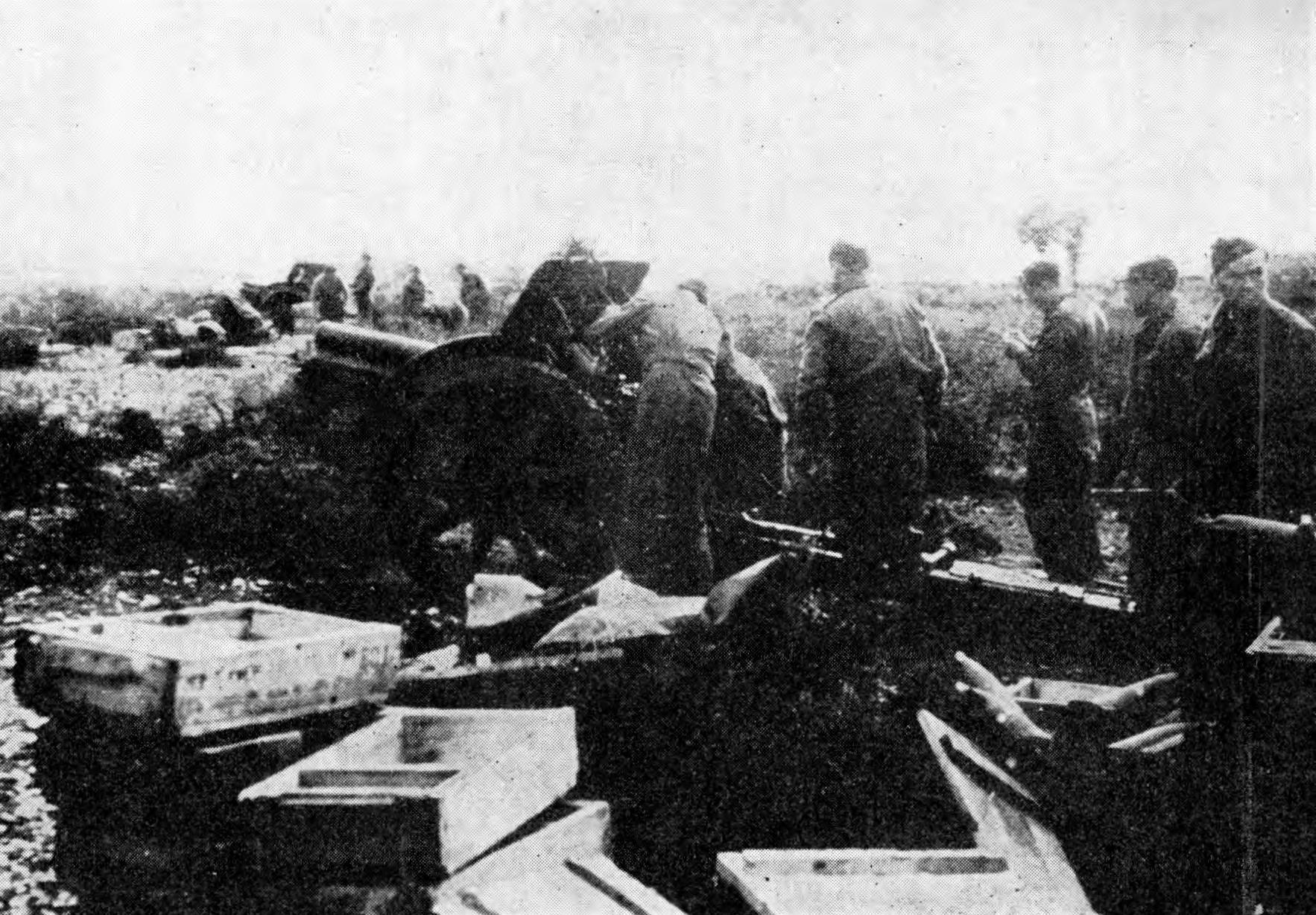
Partisan artillery near Knin in December 1944

=== Allies ===
(Democratic Federal Yugoslavia) 8th Dalmatian Corps with 13 brigades and 5 detachments totaling around 35,000 soldiers.

- 9th Division
- 19th Division
- 20th Division
- 26th Division
- Artillery Brigade of 8th Corps
- Northern Group of 1st Tank Brigade
- 1st and 2nd Air Force Escadrille (air support and protection from its base in southern Italy and Vis)
- Balkan Air Force
- Yugoslav Navy transferring arms and ammunition from Italy to Dalmatia.

=== Axis ===
(Nazi Germany) XV Mountain Corps with around 14,000 men.

- 264th Infantry Division
- 392nd (Croatian) Infantry Division
- 373rd (Croatian) Infantry Division
- 944th Coastal Artillery Regiment
- 29th Fortress Pioneer Regiment
- 581st Naval Infantry Battalion
- 583rd Naval Infantry Battalion

Dinara Division, around 4,500 Chetniks of Momčilo Đujić.

(Independent State of Croatia) 6th and 7th Ustasha Brigades and 2nd Battalion of the 3rd Croatian Home Defense Brigade, in total around 1,500 men who were on 14 November 1944 sent to Bihać.

== Initial battles ==
The first attacks began on 7 November and were directed to Strmica north of Knin and the road to Bosansko Grahovo. The 9th Assault Brigade of the 20th Dalmatian Division captured Veljun and Golubić near Knin and endangered the city form the North-East, but German and Chetnik counter-attacks, as well as harsh cold weather and snow, stopped their advance and minimized further front changes. South of Knin the 26th Division began attacking German defenses at noon on 7 November, but met fierce German resistance. They managed to take the mountain of Promina and push the Germans north towards Kaldrma, but their plan to surround them at Kosovo polje was quickly thwarted by German reinforcements sent from Knin. The 9th Division was located in Herzegovina preventing the arrival of reinforcements to Knin and securing the rear area of the 20th and 26th Divisions. Meanwhile, the 19th Division fought off the attacks of the 373rd Wehrmacht Division along Knin - Zrmanja road near the river Krka.

As soon as the German attacks were repulsed, there was a small stalemate on the front. The plan of the 8th Corps Command to take Knin quickly was not achieved. Initial attacks of the 20th and 26th Divisions gave no significant results, and the idea that the 20th Division could take Knin alone was unrealistic. Both sides have taken advantage of the two-week stalemate following the 20th Dalmatian Division failure to take Knin. The German XV Mountain Corps tried to organize a better defense of Knin, building fortifications and making some minor changes in the operating schedule. 583rd Naval Infantry Battalion was withdrawn, while the demoralized remains of the 6th and 7th Ustasha brigades and 3rd Croatian Home Defense Brigade were sent to Bihać on 12 November, leaving around 10,000 German soldiers and 4,500 Chetniks in the Knin area.

== Battle for Knin ==
The attack on Knin itself began on 25 November with a two-pronged attack on the city of Knin. From the west, the 20th Dalmatian Division was able to take a number of localities overlooking Knin with ease. However, from the south, the 26th Dalmatian Division met stiff resistance from the 264th Infantry Division (Wehrmacht). Final preparations to evacuate Knin had not been agreed upon and thus, the 264th Infantry Division (Wehrmacht) was ordered to fight to the end and make a last stand to ensure troops in Knin could evacuate.

The 19th Dalmatian Division overran the village of Oćestovo and with additional gains, encircled the town of Knin with the 20th Dalmatian Division. Axis troops within Knin attempted to break out of the encirclement to the village of Pađene in order to open up an escape corridor to the village of Otrić. Axis forces managed to open up a corridor, albeit barely a kilometre wide.

== Final phase ==
At approximately 3:00 on the night of 2/3 December, the 26th Dalmatian Division reached the entrance of Knin at the bridge over the river Krka from the south. The 26th Dalmatian Division was unable to cross into the town of Knin due to stiff resistance on the bridge. However, the 20th Dalmatian Division broke through defensive lines north west of Knin at Kninsko Polje, allowing them to enter the city of Knin at 4:00 and link up with the 26th Dalmatian Division at the southern bridge. At 11:00, all remaining Axis troops within the city of Knin surrendered to the Partisans.

== Aftermath ==
The German 264th Division was completely destroyed and was removed from the High Command active divisions list, while the 373rd and 392nd Legionar Divisions were severely damaged. The XV Mountain Corps had 6,555 killed or wounded and 4,285 captured soldiers. The Chetniks of Momčilo Đujić retreated with German help to Karlovac area together with Chetnik formations from Bosnia and Lika. The 8th Corps had 677 killed, 2,439 wounded and 126 missing soldiers. The next major offensive of the 8th Corps was the battle of Mostar.
