= Žagrović =

Village in Croatia

- Village
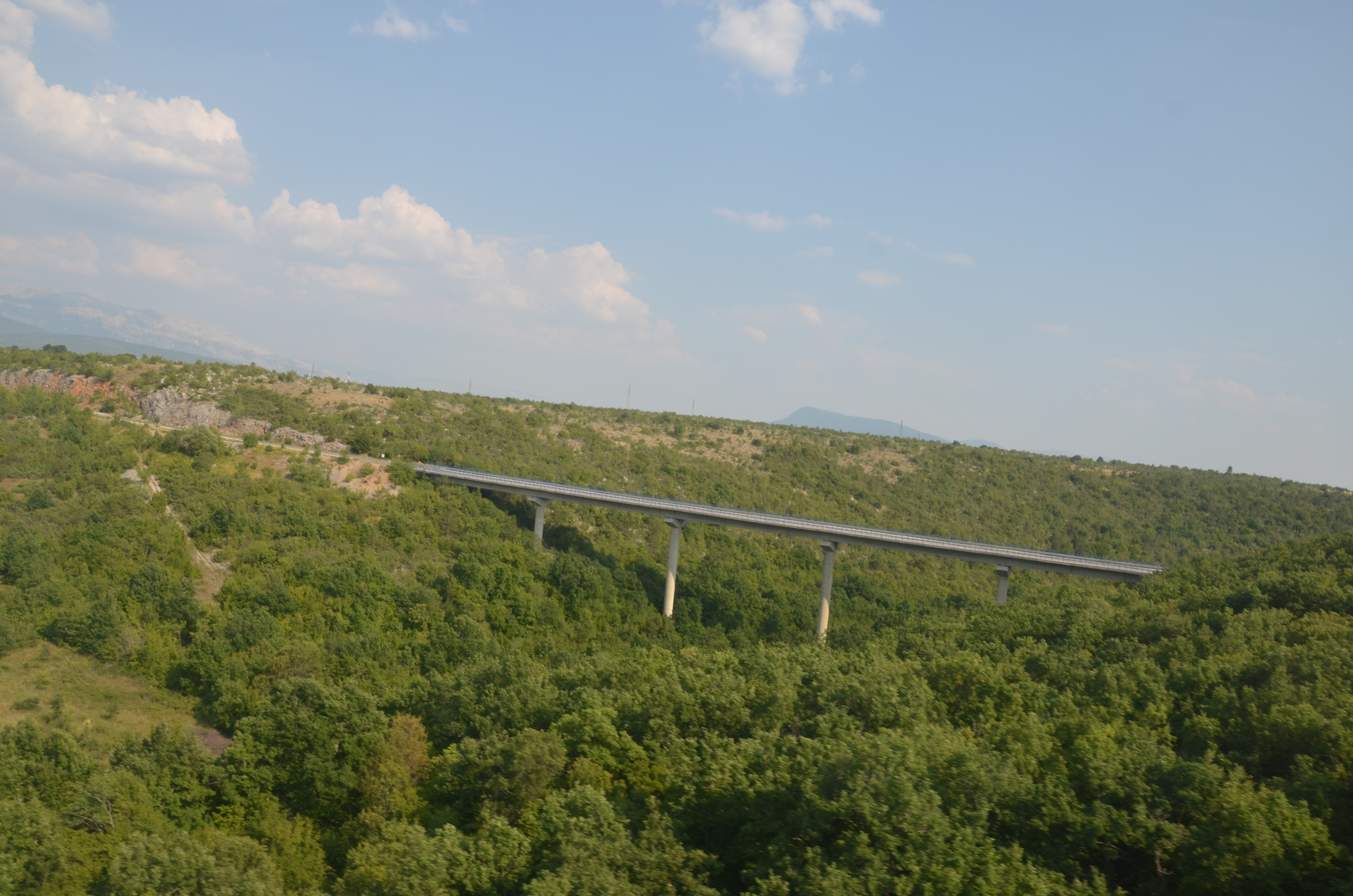

- Location within Croatia
- Coordinates: 44°02′29″N 16°11′55″E
- Country: Croatia
- County: Šibenik-Knin County
- Municipality: Knin

Area
  - Total: 24.3 km^{2} (9.4 sq mi)
- Elevation: 362 m (1,188 ft)

Population (2021)
  - Total: 509
  - Density: 20.9/km^{2} (54.3/sq mi)
- Time zone: UTC+1 (CET)
  - Summer (DST): UTC+2 (CEST)
- Postal code: 22300 Knin
- Area code: +385 22

Žagrović is a village in Croatia. It is located in the Kninska Krajina area of the Dalmatian Hinterland.

== Literature ==
- Savezni zavod za statistiku i evidenciju FNRJ i SFRJ, popis stanovništva 1948, 1953, 1961, 1971, 1981. i 1991. godine.
- Knjiga: "Narodnosni i vjerski sastav stanovništva Hrvatske, 1880–1991: po naseljima, author: Jakov Gelo, izdavač: Državni zavod za statistiku Republike Hrvatske, 1998., ISBN 953-6667-07-X, ISBN 978-953-6667-07-9;
