= Plavno =

Plavno may refer to:

- Czech name of Plauen, Germany
- Plavno, Croatia, a village near Knin
