= Vojin Jelić =

Croatian Serb poet, writer

- Војин Јелић
- Vojin Jelić
- Born: 27 November 1921; Knin, Kingdom of Serbs, Croats and Slovenes (now Croatia)
- Died: 19 December 2004 (aged 83); Zagreb, Croatia
- Education: University of Zagreb
- Writing career
- Notable awards: Vladimir Nazor Award for Life Achievement

Vojin Jelić (Serbian Cyrillic: Војин Јелић; 27 November 1921 – 19 December 2004) was a Croatian Serb writer and poet. His literally work was focused on neo-veristic introspective and retrospective interaction with Serb culture and stories from the Knin region and the wider Dalmatian Hinterland.

Jelić's work was translated into Czech, Slovene, Macedonian and English.

== Biography ==
He was born in Knin in 1921. Jelić finished gymnasium in Šibenik in 1940. He went on to study pharmacy in Belgrade.

During the World War II in Yugoslavia Jelić joined Yugoslav Partisans where he joined their units in 1943. From 1944 je joined editorijal board of the Srpska riječ ("The Serb Word") magazine.

Following the end of war Jelić initiated forestry studies in Prague in Czechoslovakia in 1945 and he completed his studies in Zagreb 1949. He wrote about Serbian culture and stories from the Knin region and Dalmatian Hinterland. He contributed to various publications and worked as a faculty lecturer and cultural advisor in various institutions in the Socialist Republic of Croatia. Jelić was the secretary general of the SKD Prosvjeta.

Jelić distanced himself from public life in Croatia in 1992 during the Croatian War of Independence and after Nedjeljko Mihanović verbally attacked him on ethnic basis. He died in Zagreb in 2004.

== Published works ==
- 1950: Đukin đerdan
- 1952: Ljudi kamenjara
- 1952: Limeni pijetao
- 1952: Ni brige te sivi tiću
- 1953: Anđeli lijepo pjevaju
- 1956: Nebo nema obala
- 1959: Trka slijepih konja
- 1960: Lete slijepi miševi
- 1961: Ne damo vam umrijeti
- 1963: Trči mali život
- 1969: Domino
- 1970: Kirvaj
- 1975: Pobožni đavo
- 1977: Gorki bajami
- 1981: Doživotni grešnici
- 1986: Kozji dvorac
- 1996: Pogledajte svoje ruke
- 2000: Dražba zavičaja

== Sources ==
- "IN MEMORIAM – Književnik Vojin Jelić (1921. – 2004.)". Vjesnik (in Croatian). 2004-12-27. p. 16.
