= Knin =

- City
- Grad Knin; City of Knin
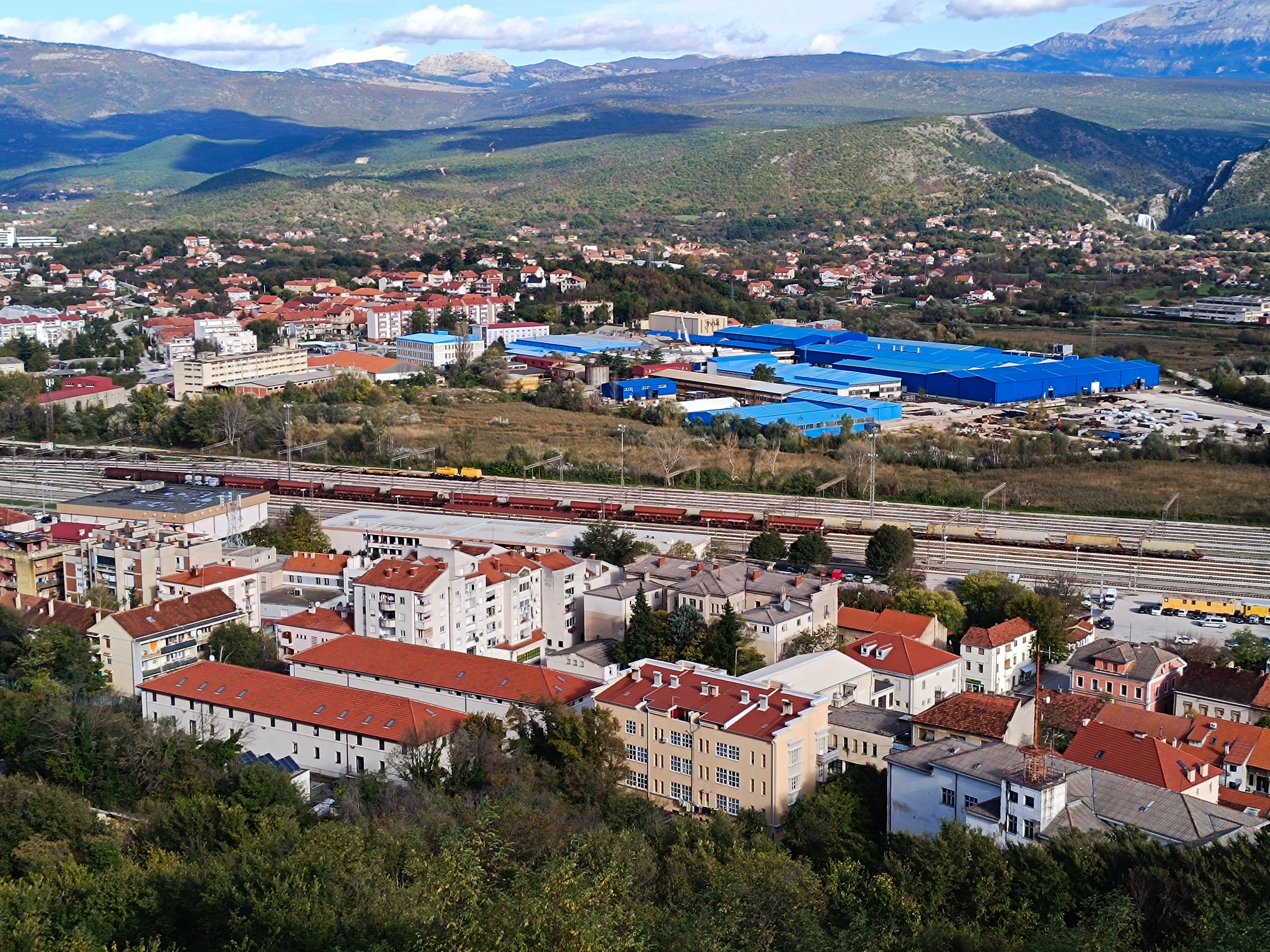
- A view of Knin from Knin Fortress

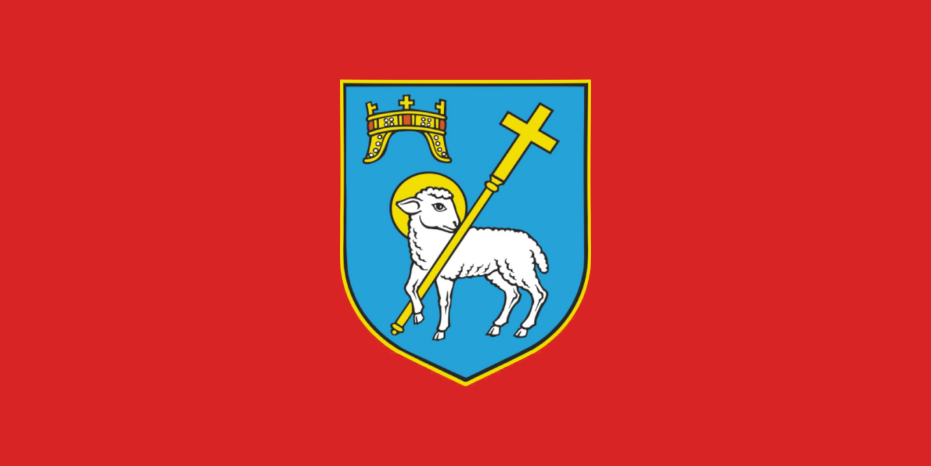
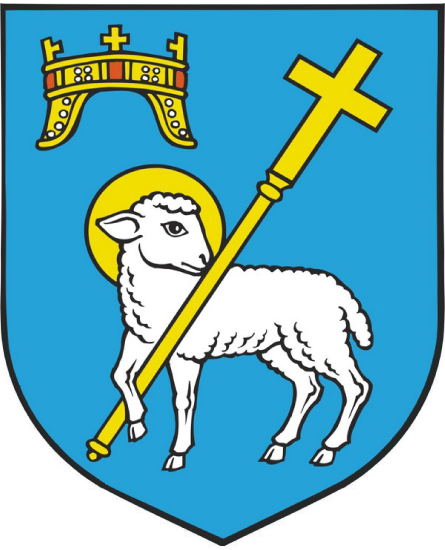
- Flag Seal
- Interactive map of Knin
- Location of Knin within Croatia
- Coordinates: 44°02′29″N 16°11′55″E
- Country: Croatia
- Region: Dalmatia (Dalmatian Hinterland)
- County: Šibenik-Knin County

Government
  - Type: Mayor-Council
  - Mayor: Marijo Ćaćić (Ind.)
  - City Council: 15 members: • HDZ (6); • List of a group of voters Marko Jelić (6); • SDSS–SDP (2); • Most–DP–Loza (1)

Area
  - City: 355.0 km^{2} (137.1 sq mi)
  - Urban: 6.5 km^{2} (2.5 sq mi)
- Elevation: 214 m (702 ft)

Population (2021)
  - City: 11,633
  - Density: 32.77/km^{2} (84.87/sq mi)
  - Urban: 8,262
  - Urban density: 1,300/km^{2} (3,300/sq mi)
- Time zone: UTC+1 (CET)
  - Summer (DST): UTC+2 (CEST)
- Postal code: 22300
- Area code: 022
- Climate: Cfa
- Website: www.knin.hr

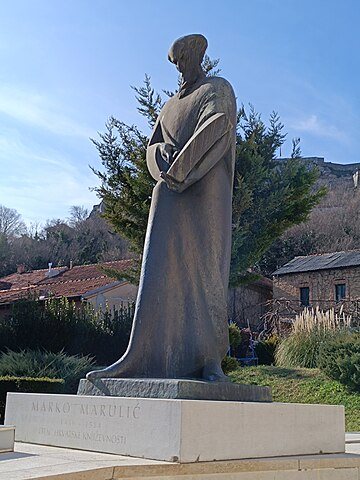
Statue of Marko Marulić - Knin

Knin (Croatian: [knîːn]) is a city in the Šibenik-Knin County of Croatia, located in the Dalmatian hinterland near the source of the river Krka, an important traffic junction on the rail and road routes between Zagreb and Split. Knin rose to prominence twice in history, as the capital of both the medieval Kingdom of Croatia and briefly of the self-proclaimed Republic of Serbian Krajina within the newly independent Republic of Croatia for the duration of the Croatian War of Independence from 1991 to 1995.

== Etymology ==
The name is likely derived from the Illyrian Ninia. According to an alternative explanation, offered by Franz Miklosich and Petar Skok, the name - derived from a Slavic root *tьn- ("to cut", "to chop") - means "cleared forest". The medieval names of Knin include Hungarian: Tinin; Italian: Tenin; Latin: Tinum. The Latin name is still used as a titular episcopal see, the Diocese of Tinum.

== History ==
Timeline of Knin
Historical affiliations

Kingdom of Croatia (to 1102)
Kingdom of Croatia (union with Hungary), 1102–1522
Ottoman Empire, 1522–1688
Republic of Venice, 1688–1797
Holy Roman Empire, 1797–1805
First French Empire, 1805–1813
Austrian Empire, 1813–1867
Austro-Hungarian Monarchy, 1867–1918
Kingdom of Yugoslavia, 1918–1941
Independent State of Croatia, 1941–1944
SFR Yugoslavia, 1944–1991
Republic of Serbian Krajina, 1991–1995 (de facto)
Croatia, 1991 (de jure)/1995 (de facto)–present

=== Ancient ===
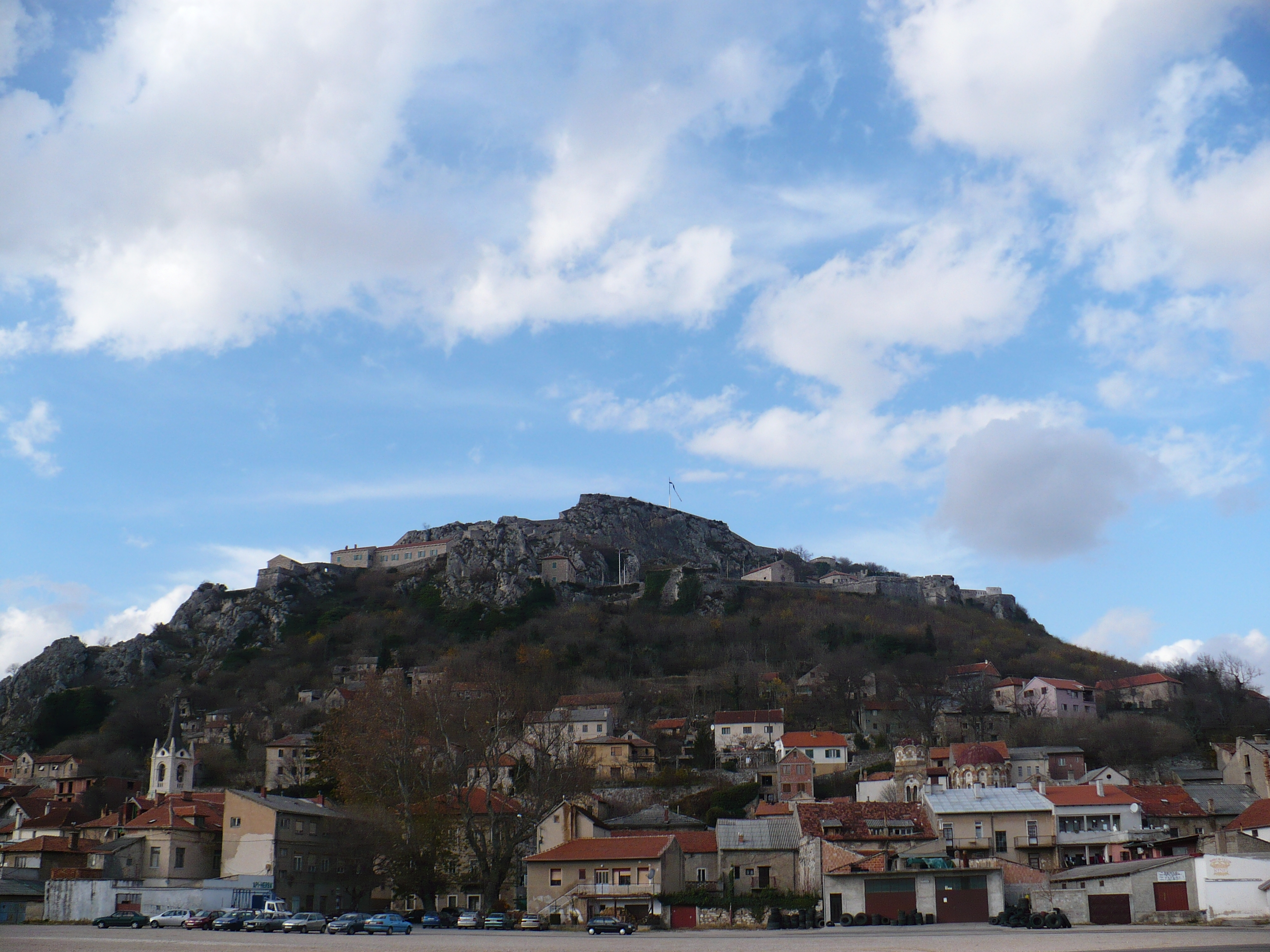
View of the Knin Fortress from the city center

The area consisting of today's Knin, or more specifically, the Spas hill, has been inhabited since the Stone Age. In the vicinity of today's Knin was once a town called Burnum, which served as a Roman military camp in the 1st century BC.

=== Middle Ages ===
The original settlement grew atop the Spas hill in the earliest history and which later formed the castle of Knin. The first church, a monastery dedicated to Saint Bartholomew, was built during the time of Trpimir I in the 9th century in Kapitul (south-east from Knin Castle, where the later bishopric was located). It was later expanded or rebuilt by a certain Duke of Croatia, probably Svetoslav, during the reign of king Stephen Držislav of Croatia in the 10th century.

Knin is first mentioned in the 10th-century work De Administrando Imperio as the centre of the Knin county (županija), and as one of the populated towns in Croatia. Around 1040, at the behest of the Croatian kings, a seat of the royal bishop was established in the nearby royal village of Biskupija (Kosovo), in the church of Saint Mary. The first "bishop of the Croats" is named Marko Giudice, and he and his successors were attached to the royal court as preachers and king's "special bishops" until 1102.

Knin became a more permanent royal residence of king Demetrius Zvonimir around 1080. Because of this, it has led to Knin being known as the "City of Croatian Kings" or "Zvonimir's City" (Zvonimirov grad) in recent times. In the following decade, during the succession crisis, the city was the permanent residence of a local lord Petar Snačić, who contested the crown of Croatia until his defeat by king Coloman of Hungary in 1096. At that point, it came into possession of the Hungarian Arpad dynasty, and since then, it ceased to be a permanent royal residence but remained as a political and administrative center of the kingdom. The parish church dedicated to king Saint Stephen is thought to have been built during this period.

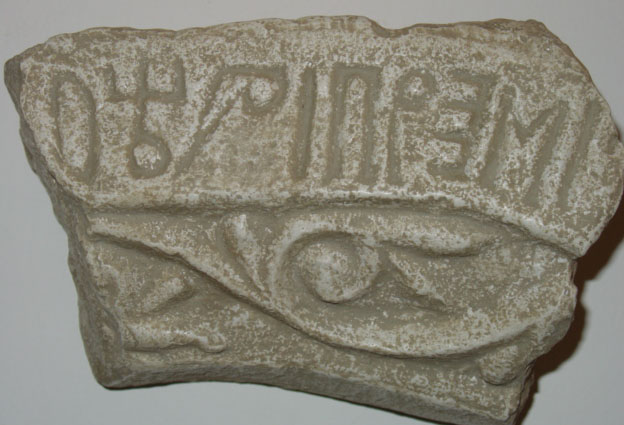
11th-12th century stone fragment from the Church of Saint Bartholomew in Kapitul next to Knin, representing a mixture of Glagolitic and Cyrillic scripts

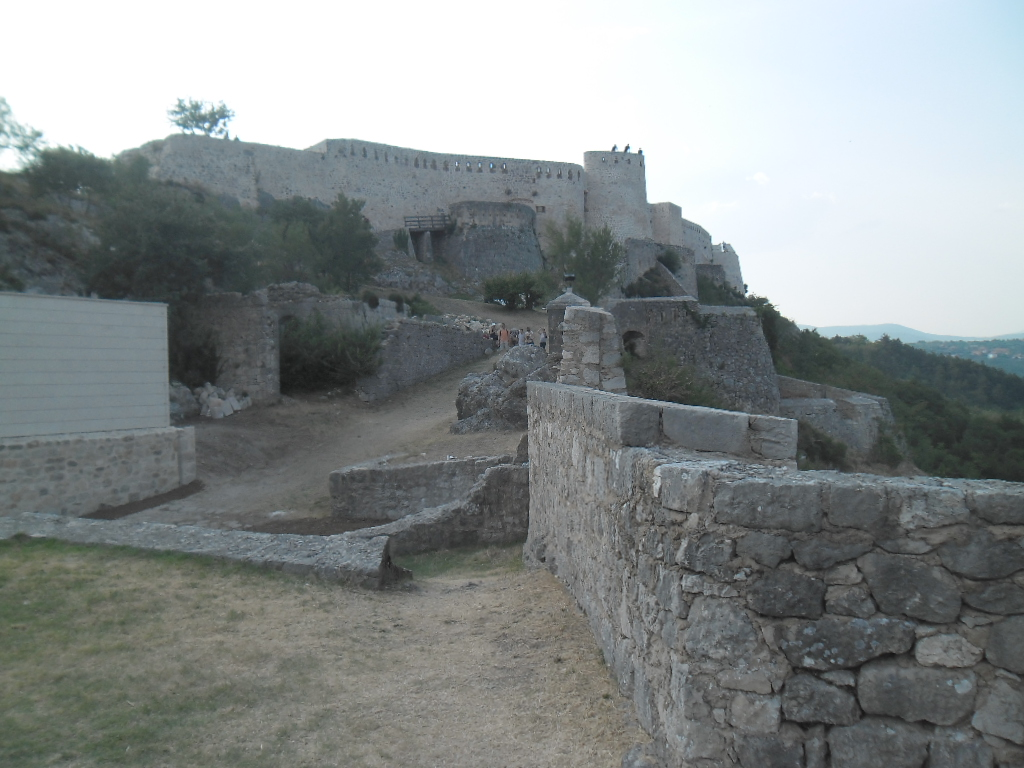
Knin Fortress probably from the 6th or 10th century

In 1178, it is for the first time mentioned as "civitates" (city) in a contemporary local source. Due to the extinction of the local ruling dynasty, the Croatian bishop moved his see to Knin itself, after which he started calling himself the Bishop of Knin. This precipitated the construction of a new cathedral, which was initiated in 1203 by the son of the Duke of Knin, Dobroslav in Kapitul.

The city was visited by Queen Maria Laskarina, the daughter of the Byzantine Emperor and wife of king Béla IV of Hungary, together with her retinue of nobles and a great number of soldiers in 1261 in order to introduce her son to the Croatian nobility and to negotiate their oath in recognizing him as the designated duke (herceg). In 1264, the first case of judicial function in the city was mentioned and during this time, Knin was the seat of both the Croatian ban, and the duke, who acted as a semi-independent ruler with close connection to the king and whose chancellor had been the bishop of Knin. Between 1270 and 1272, the new cathedral was consecrated on the orders of the Knin bishop Nicholas. The cathedral is described as being "magnificent" and "solemn" by subsequent documents. By this point, a new town had already developed outside the castle complex. A market square (forum) was for the first time mentioned in the second half of 13th century.

The transition from 13th to 14th century was marked in the rise of the Šubić noble family, whose members likely made Knin one of the seats within their realm. According to the 19th century Franciscan friar and historian Donato Fabianich, the monastery of Saint Catherine was founded around this time by the Knin nobility which were first settled there by Mladen Šubić. Their rule over Knin came to an end at the Battle of Bliska in 1322, after which the Angevin king Charles Robert arrived in the city and imprisoned the former lord Mladen II Šubić of Bribir. Upon the departure of the king to Hungary, the noble Ivan Nelipić quickly seized Knin, and from there expelled the king's men from Croatia. Thus, these territories de facto continued to remain outside the monarchy, and the Nelipić noble family made Knin their permanent seat and ruled their territories as "Princes of Knin".

After successfully warring against their enemies, the Dalmatian cities and nobility under Juraj II Šubić of Bribir (who was imprisoned in the castle's dungeons), as well as the royal forces commanded by the Slavonian ban Mikac Prodanić, their rule came to an end when Louis I of Hungary personally led an army to re-establish royal power over Knin in 1345. During this time it became known that the castle consisted of two major parts, administered by two castellans and which was populated by houses and baths, a palace with a main hall used previously by the Nelipić's to sign an alliance with the Republic of Venice and to enforce customs on imports to the city. An annual trade fair, on Saint Bartholomew's day is known to have taken place in the settlement below since at least the 1360s and was regularly attended by the merchants from the Dalmatian cities. It is known that Knin's also burg housed a significant colony of merchants originating from these cities which also gives insight into its commercial importance. A supreme judicial body for the whole of Croatia was formed, composed of Croatian nobility, and was located on the castle grounds. A chapel dedicated to Saint Bartholomew located within the cathedral was the place of notary of the Knin See. There the noble Ivan Nelipić (son of Vladislava) had reaffirmed his rights to the estates and lands in Cetina during his stay in the city.

Stone slab of Knin Fortress depicting Stephaton thought to have originated from the Church of St. Stephen in the Knin's burg, 11th century

Using the dynastic instability in the neighboring lands, the city came into the hands of the Bosnian king Tvrtko I during the year of 1388. The previous bishop had likely been expelled, where the Ragusan Mihailo took his place, and was also given the office of the king's chancellor. These actions provoked a retaliation of king Sigismund, whose armies besieged Knin in September 1390. The city, along with other territories were returned to Sigismund in 1393. Upon his return from the disastrous battle of Nicopolis in 1396, the king spent a month in Knin to consolidate his holdings and state affairs of Dalmatia and Croatia, issuing various decrees together with his ban Nikola Gorjanski. In 1401, the city was besieged by the Bosnian king Stephen Ostoja, who encamped in the adjacent Knin field (Kninsko polje), and remained there until the following year. The newly crowned king Ladislaus of Naples attained support from the castellan of Knin and issued his first decree there in 1403.

Because of frequent harassment, the citizens of Knin had to pay tribute to the duke Hrvoje Vukčić Hrvatinić, and for a short while, the city seemed to have been directly under his rule. The presence of Franciscans is for the first time mentioned in the 15th century, which were located in the old Saint Mary's church and monastery in the city. Apart from them, other religious buildings are mentioned such as the church of the Holy Spirit.

Its strategic position played an important role in many wars and power changes – the Republic of Venice often reflected on its importance as a key castle and the main entrance to Dalmatia, which it attempted to obtain during the 15th century. During these years both the city, the ban and his dignitaries played a crucial role in the struggle for dominance over the coastal cities with Venice. In 1430 Knin and the Church of St. Bartolomeo in Kapitul were the centre of the "Union and Brotherhood of the Croats" (Latin: unio et fraternitas Croatorum), a congregation of Croatian nobles formed by 12 counties of Croatia in order to "preserve the fame and old customs of the Croatian Kingdom".

It was in 1420 that the Nelipić noble family again regained their former role in Croatia with the emergence of Ivaniš Nelipić, which again distanced these territories from the crown. These possessions were later acquired after Ivaniš's death in 1435 by Anž of the House of Frankopan through the marriage with the Nelipić nobles. Knin and the surrounding possessions were restored to the crown upon Anž's death in 1437. In 1454 an attempt between the Bosnian king and the Venetians was made to acquire the city, which was referenced as "capital and foremost place of Croatia" in their letters.

During the reign of king Matthias Corvinus, the bishops of Knin were selected as the king's principal orators abroad in collecting the help needed against the invading Ottoman Empire. The bishop was thus first secretly involved at the pope to solicit financial aid for Matthias' military campaign. The city's distant surroundings quickly became a target for Ottoman raids. As the raids were becoming more frequent, one of them reached Knin, where a Franciscan monastery has been recorded to have been destroyed in 1469.

In 1493, the first direct attempt of siege by the Ottomans was undertaken, which was followed by ban John Corvinus and his deputies invading and pillaging the Ottoman territories from the city. The Republic of Venice started to financially support the city's defences in fear for its possessions in Dalmatia. In 1501, three Ottoman spies were caught and imprisoned by the vice-ban. They were sent by the Sanjak-bey of Bosnia, and had infiltrated Knin posing as friars that were on their way to sell vestments to the market. They were to investigate the situation in the Zadar surrounding.

The last major conflict around Knin before the truce was in September 1502 when 2,000 Ottoman cavalrymen looted the area. On 20 August 1503 King Vladislaus II concluded a 7-year peace treaty with Sultan Bayezid II. The armistice was generally respected by all sides, during which Knin's defensive positions were strengthened in 1504. A period of severe famine started in 1505 that affected entire Dalmatia. In 1510 the plague halved Knin's population.

Knin castle, settlement and Kapitul around 1525, after Ottoman conquest from the map of Dalmatia from Matteo Pagano

In 1510 around 1,000 Ottoman Akıncı raided the countryside of Knin. There had been word that viceban of Croatia was captured on that occasion. Baltazar Baćan (Hungarian: Boldizsár Batthyány), viceban of Slavonia, together with forces from the Zagreb Bishopry, managed to lift the siege of Knin in January 1513. Next year in February the Ottomans laid siege on Knin with 10,000 men from the Sanjak of Bosnia, but were unable to take the city and lost 500 troops. Knin's burg and outskirts were burned on this occasion. These clashes left Knin devastated and there was no news about the city for five years. Local population was decimated by war, hunger, plague and migration to safer places, and its economy was hindered by the seizure of crops and livestock. Due to Knin's strategic value, King Louis II responded to requests from captains of Knin, Skradin and Ostrovica and promised reinforcements of 1,000 infantry and 1,000 cavalrymen. However, it is unlikely that these forces arrived to the endangered towns.

On 29 May 1522 after the final siege of the Knin castle, it fell to the Ottoman Empire, and Croats left the town in large numbers. The Ottomans repopulated the town with new inhabitants from Bosnia.

=== Ottoman and Venetian period ===
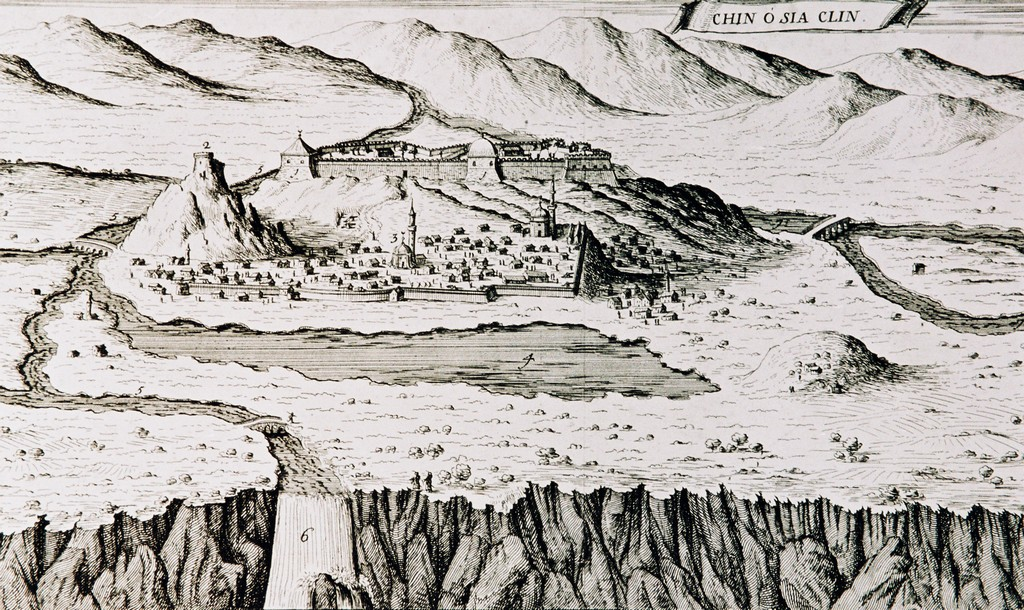
Knin around 1688

The bishops who held the title no longer resided in Knin after it fell to the Ottoman Turks in 1522. It was initially part of the Sanjak of Kilis, later the centre of the Sanjak of Kırka, was founded in 1574. By 1540, Ottomans massively populated area between Skradin and Knin with Vlachs. It was briefly occupied by the Venetian Republic in 1648 during the Cretan War, and then taken again in 1688. The Croatian population partially returned and the Franciscans built a monastery and a church there in 1708. Ottomans aimed to retake Knin in 1715 during their last war with Venice, but their siege was repulsed.

After Venice captured the district, the Bishop of Šibenik was appointed to administer the diocese, which was united in 1828 to Šibenik. The bishopric is today the titular see of Tinum.

=== Habsburg era ===
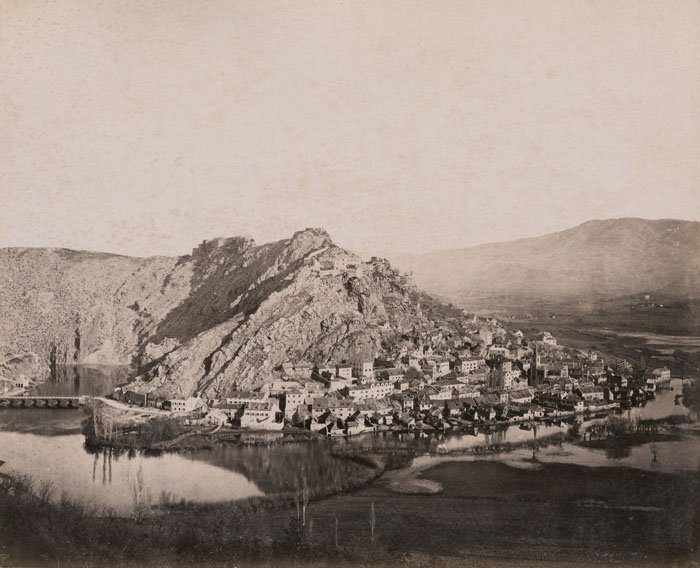
Knin in 1866-1898

Knin passed on to the Habsburgs together with Dalmatia in 1797 according to the Treaty of Campo Formio. After the Peace of Pressburg in 1805, the French Empire gained the city and incorporated it into the Illyrian Provinces in 1809. By 1813, the Austrians regained control over the town. By the end of the 19th century, as a part of the Habsburg domain of Dalmatia, Knin grew steadily, becoming an important commercial as well as road and railway center. In 1867, Knin became a part of Dalmatia – a territorial entity within Cisleithania.

=== Modern ===
==== Kingdom of Yugoslavia and World War II ====
After the First World War, Knin became a part of the State of Slovenes, Croats and Serbs in 1918, which after a brief Italian military occupation subsequently became part of the Kingdom of Serbs, Croats and Slovenes (named Kingdom of Yugoslavia after 1929). Previously only connected with rail to Šibenik and Split (with narrow gauge to Drvar and Prijedor as well), in 1925 Lika railway connected Knin with Zagreb and north in general. It gradually became a busy rail hub; already in 1927 a total of 58,000 passengers departed Knin rail station. After the assassination of King Alexander of Yugoslavia in 1934, Momčilo Đujić joined the Chetnik Association of Kosta Pećanac, forming several bands in the Knin region of Dalmatia.

In World War II, Knin was in the so-called second Italian occupation zone, administered by the civilian authorities of the collaborationist Independent State of Croatia led by the fascist Ustaša regime, but with heavy fascist Italian military presence. The Ustaša regime declared Knin the county seat of Bribir and Sidraga. The entire area was the scene of the Ustashe genocide campaign against the local Serb population. After the Italian surrender in September 1943, German forces became the main factor in the region.

The Italians relied heavily on local ethnic Serb militias (Chetniks) to maintain order and suppress partisan resistance. In 1941 Đujić's Chetniks began killing and mutilating Croat civilians. In April 1943, Đujić's Chetniks set up a prison and execution site in the village of Kosovo (today Biskupija), near Knin. Thousands of local civilians (both Croats and even Serb Anti-Fascists) including women and children, as well as captured Partisans, were held and mistreated at this prison, while hundreds of prisoners (as many as over 1,000) were tortured and killed at an execution site near a ravine close to the camp. Recruiting for Chetnik formations in the region was assisted by the so-called leftist errors of the Yugoslav Partisans, which drove undecided Serbs to join the Chetniks.

The Battle of Knin was the culmination of the "Offensive for the Liberation of Dalmatia" carried out by the 8th Dalmatian Corps. On 25 November 1944, the Yugoslav Partisans attacked the town of Knin, which was defended by 14,000 German troops, 4,500 of Đujić's Chetniks, and around 1,500 Ustaše. Under the walls of the Knin Fortress, the Wehrmacht suffered what was probably the greatest single defeat in this region in the entire war. With around 50,000 troops involved and more than 7,000 casualties on all sides, the Partisans liberated Knin on 9 December.

==== Socialist Yugoslavia ====
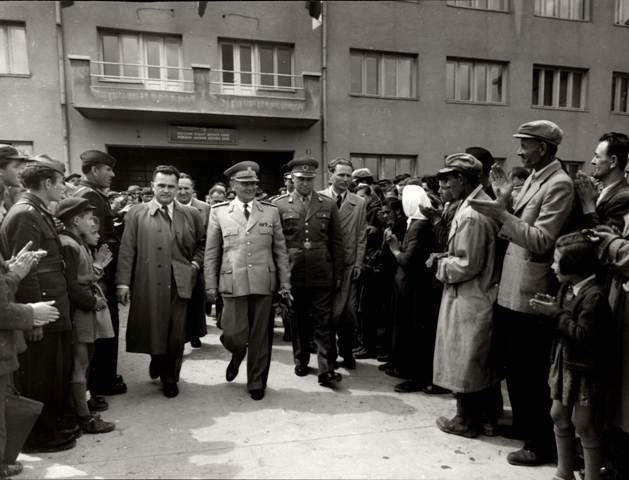
President of Yugoslavia Josip Broz Tito in Knin in 1954.

Between 1945 and 1990, Knin saw rapid industrialization and modernization, becoming a centre of a wider region. Una railway was opened in 1948 and Knin-Zadar railway in 1967, making Knin train station one of the most important and busiest hubs in Croatia.

==== Croatian War of Independence ====
On 8 July 1989, a large Serb nationalist rally was held in Knin, during which banners threatening Yugoslav People's Army intervention in Croatia, as well as Chetnik iconography was displayed. From October 1990, eight months before Croatia declared independence (25 June 1991) from Yugoslavia, Knin became the main stronghold for the Serbs in the Knin region, eventually becoming the capital city of the unrecognized self-declared Republic of Serbian Krajina in 1991. The leaders of Krajina were Knin locals: Milan Martić and Milan Babić, both convicted for ethnic cleansing of Croats and other non-Serbs from Krajina by ICTY. Widespread acts of murder and violence, detention and intimidation became pervasive throughout the RSK territory from 1992 to 1995. During that time 93.9% of Croats were expelled from the town and municipality of Knin.

Knin camp was a detention camp run by the Krajina Serbian Army, that held Croatian detainees, soldiers and civilians, from 1991 until 1992, during the Croatian War of Independence. Former prisoners testified that they were arrested by Serb paramilitary forces and then deported into Knin camp. The detainees were beaten, mistreated and humiliated. Serbs held the town until Croatian forces captured it during Operation Storm on 5 August 1995. The date is today marked as a Victory Day in Croatia.

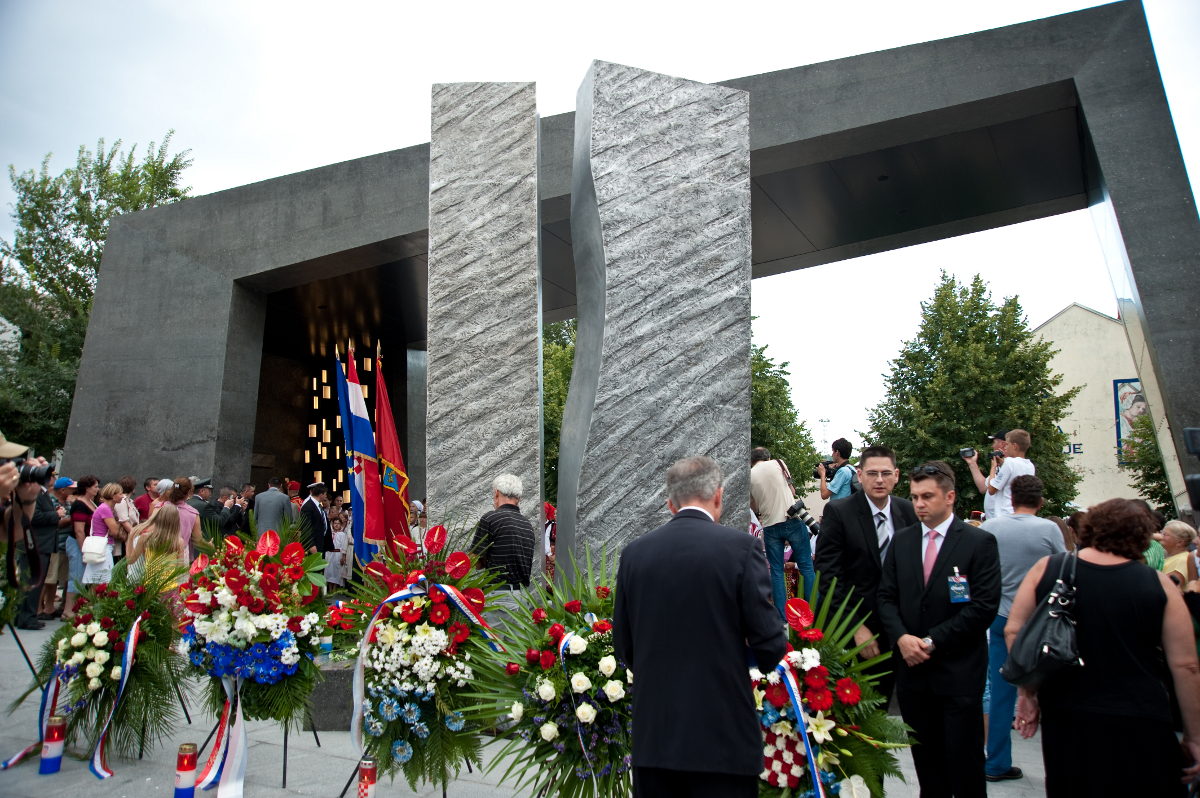
Monument of the Croatian Victory "Storm '95" was made on the 16th anniversary of Operation Storm

In February 2015, during the Croatia–Serbia genocide case, the International Court of Justice (ICJ) dismissed the Serbian lawsuit claim that Operation Storm constituted genocide ruling that Croatia did not have the specific intent to exterminate the country's Serb minority, though it reaffirmed that serious crimes against Serb civilians had taken place. Fleeing civilians and people remaining in United Nations protected areas were subject to various forms of harassment, including military assaults and acts by Croatian civilians. On 8 August, a refugee column was shelled. Human Rights Watch reported, in 1996, that the vast majority of the abuses were committed by Croatian forces. These abuses, which continued on a large scale even months after Operation Storm, included summary executions of elderly and infirm Serbs who remained behind and the wholesale burning and destruction of Serbian villages and property. Executions of civilians took place in and around the town of Knin.

The majority of the population had already fled by the time the Croatian Army took control of Knin. At the end of the war, Knin's demographic composition changed greatly with the influx of Croat refugees from Bosnia and former Croat militia members. They replaced, to a great extent, those Serbs who fled during Operation Storm. In 2015, Amnesty International report that Croatian Serbs continued to face discrimination in public sector employment and the restitution of tenancy rights to social housing vacated during the war.

== Geography ==
Knin is located in the northern Dalmatian region of Croatia, 56 kilometres east of the coastal town of Šibenik, at 44°02′18″N 16°11′59″E.

The original Roman settlement developed on the foothills of the Dinaric Alps. It was on these foothills that the Knin Fortress was built. The source of the Krka river begins on the outskirts of the town.

== Climate ==
Knin has a modified Mediterranean climate (Cfa, nearing the border with Csa) with hot dry summers and cool winters. Although the city is only some 50 km (31 mi) from the Adriatic Sea, an arm of the Mediterranean, the proximity of the Dinaric Alps to the north alters its climate. Knin is particularly known for its hot summers: temperatures reaching 40 °C (104 °F) are not uncommon in July and August. The January average temperature is about 4 °C and in August is about 24 °C

Climate data for Knin (1971–2000, extremes 1949–2022)
Month	Jan	Feb	Mar	Apr	May	Jun	Jul	Aug	Sep	Oct	Nov	Dec	Year
Record high °C (°F)	20.5 (68.9)	22.3 (72.1)	27.6 (81.7)	29.2 (84.6)	34.2 (93.6)	40.4 (104.7)	40.9 (105.6)	42.3 (108.1)	37.4 (99.3)	31.6 (88.9)	27.6 (81.7)	21.6 (70.9)	42.3 (108.1)
Mean daily maximum °C (°F)	8.9 (48.0)	10.4 (50.7)	14.1 (57.4)	17.4 (63.3)	23.0 (73.4)	26.6 (79.9)	30.1 (86.2)	30.3 (86.5)	25.4 (77.7)	19.9 (67.8)	13.7 (56.7)	9.9 (49.8)	19.1 (66.4)
Daily mean °C (°F)	4.0 (39.2)	5.1 (41.2)	8.2 (46.8)	11.5 (52.7)	16.6 (61.9)	20.1 (68.2)	23.0 (73.4)	22.5 (72.5)	18.0 (64.4)	13.3 (55.9)	8.2 (46.8)	5.0 (41.0)	13.0 (55.4)
Mean daily minimum °C (°F)	−0.2 (31.6)	0.7 (33.3)	3.3 (37.9)	6.5 (43.7)	10.6 (51.1)	13.8 (56.8)	16.2 (61.2)	16.0 (60.8)	12.2 (54.0)	8.3 (46.9)	3.8 (38.8)	0.9 (33.6)	7.7 (45.9)
Record low °C (°F)	−18.3 (−0.9)	−18.4 (−1.1)	−14.0 (6.8)	−4.1 (24.6)	−0.4 (31.3)	4.3 (39.7)	8.1 (46.6)	6.8 (44.2)	1.0 (33.8)	−3.3 (26.1)	−8.5 (16.7)	−15.4 (4.3)	−18.4 (−1.1)
Average precipitation mm (inches)	75.9 (2.99)	69.8 (2.75)	74.7 (2.94)	92.0 (3.62)	90.5 (3.56)	81.1 (3.19)	43.7 (1.72)	61.7 (2.43)	108.1 (4.26)	114.3 (4.50)	112.3 (4.42)	101.7 (4.00)	1,025.8 (40.39)
Average precipitation days (≥ 0.1 mm)	10.7	9.2	9.6	11.8	11.4	10.8	6.4	7.1	8.8	10.5	11.0	11.0	118.4
Average snowy days (≥ 1.0 cm)	1.3	1.2	0.2	0.0	0.0	0.0	0.0	0.0	0.0	0.0	0.3	0.5	3.5
Average relative humidity (%)	69.0	63.5	62.2	63.1	63.6	62.1	56.1	58.3	65.8	69.2	70.1	70.3	64.4
Mean monthly sunshine hours	120.9	146.9	182.9	189.0	244.9	270.0	325.5	297.6	234.0	182.9	123.0	108.5	2,426.1
Source: Croatian Meteorological and Hydrological Service

Since records began in 1949, the highest temperature recorded at the local weather station at an elevation of 255 metres (837 ft) was 42.3 °C (108.1 °F), on 10 August 2017. The coldest temperature was −18.4 °C (−1.1 °F), on 17 February 1956.

== Demographics ==
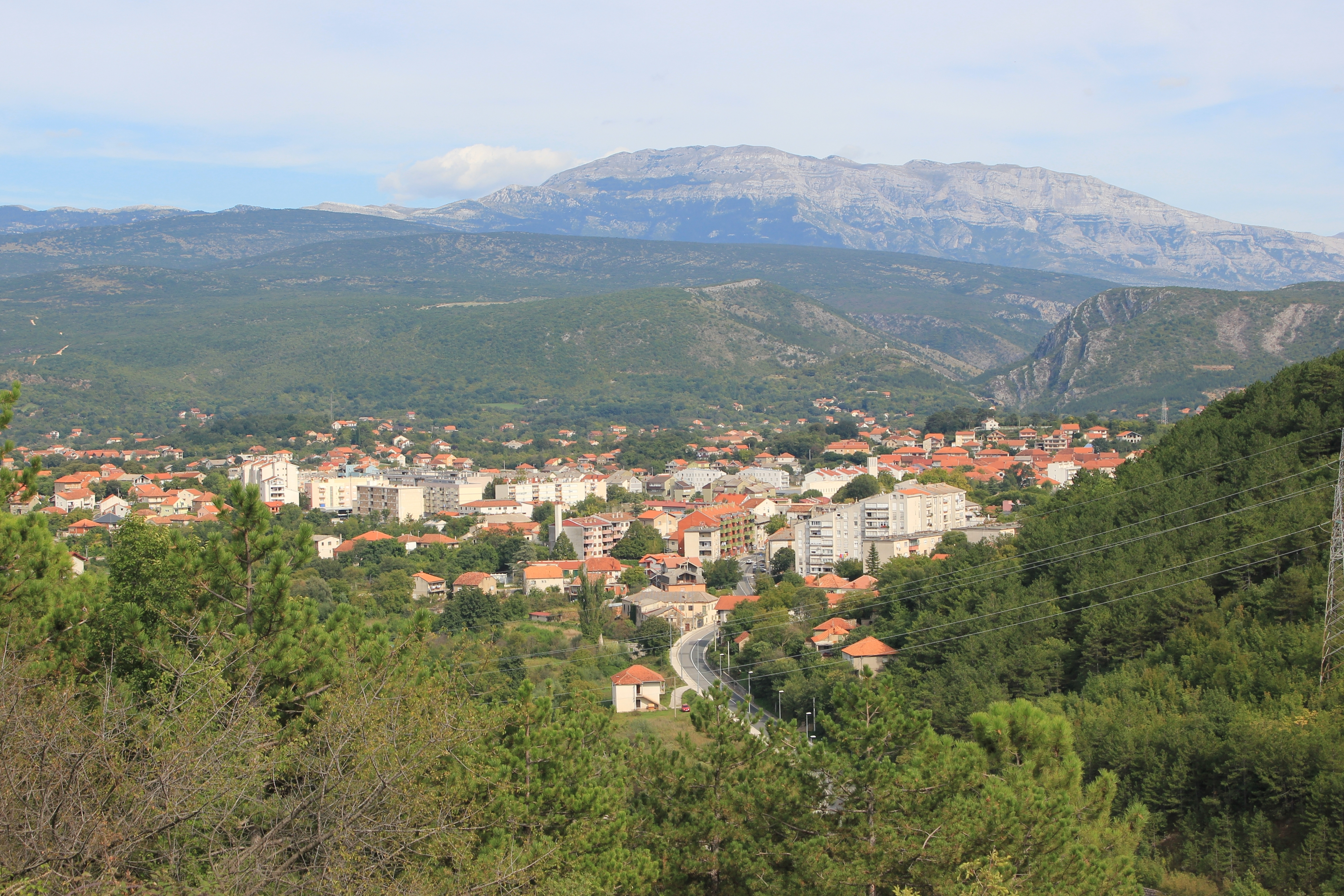
View of Knin and the Dinara mountain

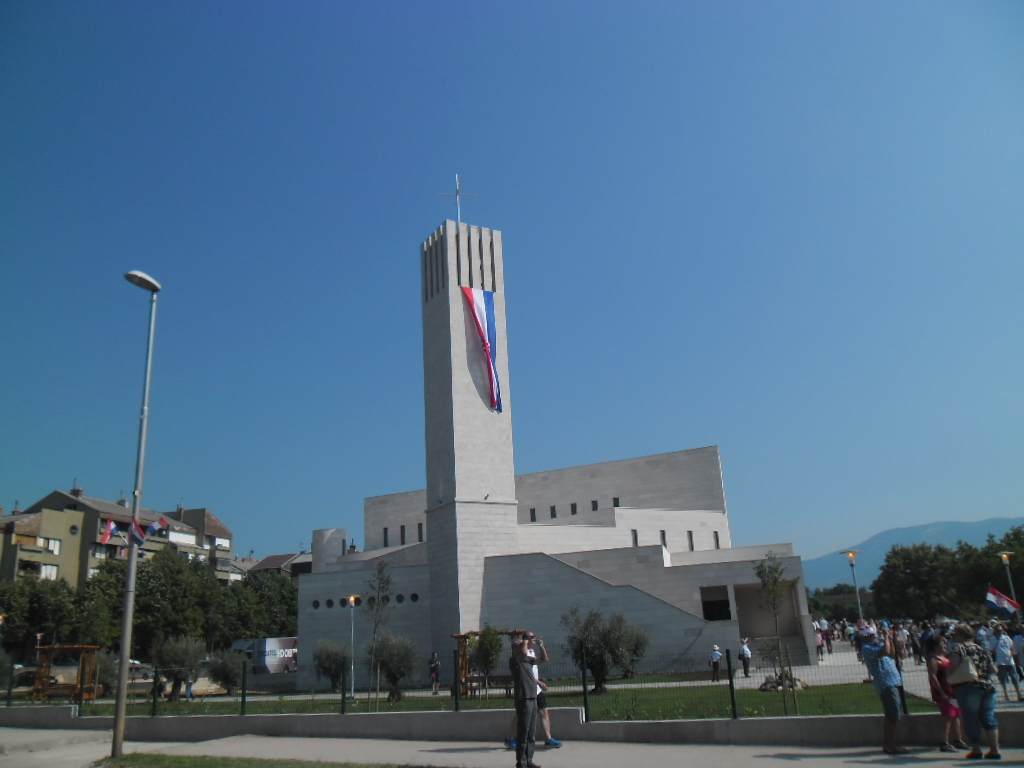
Our Lady of the Great Croatian Baptismal Vow church

According to 2021 census data, the population in Knin municipality was 11,755 and in town proper 8,317. 29.8% of population is of the age of 60 or older, while 18.6% of population is 20 or younger. Croatian Bureau of Statistics estimated the population of Knin municipality on 31 December 2020 to stand at 11,286. This represents a steep decline: ten years earlier, in the 2011 census, Knin municipality had a population of 15,388, while Knin (town, proper) had a population of 10,493. In the 2001 census, the population of Knin was 15,190 (whole municipality) with 11,128 in town proper. Ethnically, Croats formed the majority with 76.45% while the population share of Serbs stood at 20.8%.

Knin has recently seen a steep population decline, not least due to high emigration rates, especially since Croatia joined the EU in 2013 and its citizens consequently face few to no work and immigration restrictions. Elementary school student population in Knin (ages 6 to 14) has sharply declined by 29% between 2013 and 2019. Knin's population is also in more flux than that of other Croatian cities given that it has a major refugee problem: both with a large number of Croats from neighbouring Bosnia-Herzegovina who immigrated there post-1995 and Serbs from Knin who are still refugees in Bosnia-Herzegovina or Serbia. Immigrant Croats form the majority in the city with only a scattered Serb presence in the surrounding villages.

Town of Knin: Population trends 1857–2021
v

population	10637	11284	10660	12294	13179	14621	13320	15482	17048	18662	20164	20872	21854	23025	15190	15407	11633
	1857	1869	1880	1890	1900	1910	1921	1931	1948	1953	1961	1971	1981	1991	2001	2011	2021

Sources: Croatian Bureau of Statistics publications

=== Demographic history ===
Before the Croatian War of Independence 87% of the population of the municipality and 79% of the city were Serbs. During the war, most of the non-Serb population was displaced from Knin, while in the last days of the war most of the Serbs left Knin, fearing incoming Croatian forces. In February 2015, during the Croatia–Serbia genocide case, the judgment of the International Court of Justice stated that it is not disputed that a substantial part of the Serb population fled that region as a direct consequence of the military actions. The Croatian authorities were aware that the operation would provoke a mass exodus; they even to some extent predicated their military planning on such an exodus, which they considered not only probable, but desirable. As a consequence of the war and population displacement, Knin municipality population has nearly halved between 1991 and 2001 (from 23 to 15 thousand).

==== Knin (municipality) ====
Besides the town of Knin itself, Knin municipality today consists of following settlements: Golubić, Kninsko Polje, Kovačić, Ljubač, Oćestovo, Plavno, Polača, Potkonje, Radljevac, Strmica, Vrpolje and Žagrović. The data below and in the population graph is based on current municipality, since in the past the Knin municipality often changed its borders.

Year	1880	1890	1900	1910	1931	1948	1953	1961	1971	1981	1991	2001	2011	2021
Croats	15.1%	14.5%	14.3%	14.4%	10.9%	14.6%	14.5%	15.3%	15.2%	11.3%	10.3%	76.5%	75.4%	76.82%
Serbs	82.3%	84.5%	83.5%	84.2%	89%	84.7%	84.1%	82.1%	80.7%	72.8%	85.5%	20.8%	23.0%	21.42%
Others	2.6%	1%	2.2%	1.5%	0%	0.7%	1.5%	2.6%	4.1%	15.9%	4.2%	2.7%	1.6%	1.76%

==== Knin (town) ====
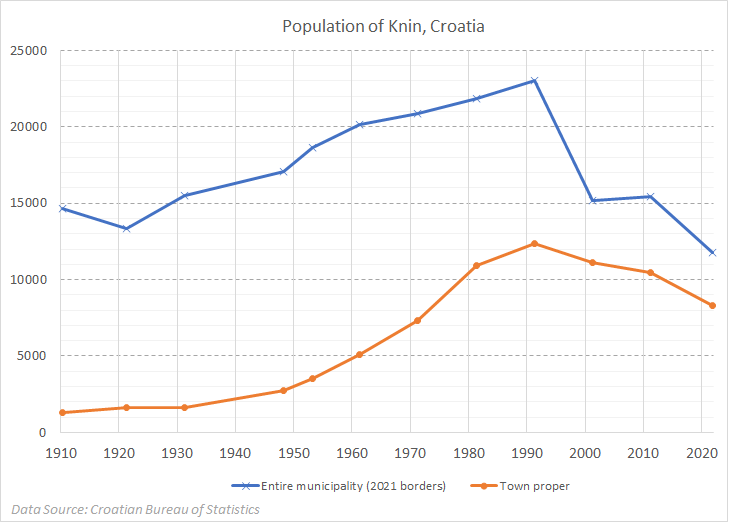
Town proper grew faster than other settlements in the municipality. Before WW2 just under 12% of the entire municipality population lived in town proper; by 1991 the share was ~55%. In 2021 census the share was at 71%.

The town of Knin had a small population compared to its surroundings until the aftermath of World War II. Just 15% of population of municipality lived in Knin proper; neighbouring Plavno, Oćestovo and Polača had basically the same or even larger population than Knin. With increased urbanisation and industrialization in post-WWII socialist era (1945-1991), Knin urban population rapidly increased from 2,600 to 12,300. At that point, more than a half of municipality's population lived in the town of Knin. After 1991, due to the war and population displacement, as well as transition shock and deindustrialization, population has been steadily declining.

The 1857 data show that 75.55% of the town's population was Roman Catholic. According to the Austrian Census held in 1900, the town of Knin had 1,302 residents. In 1910 the town had 1,270 citizens. After 1945, with urbanization and modernization, Knin attracted much of the countryside population which was overwhelmingly Serbian Orthodox. As a consequence, ethnic/religious composition of town changed as well. Intermarriages and a desire to straddle the divide between the communities resulted at one point in a substantial part of the population declaring themselves as Yugoslavs rather than either Croats or Serbs (22% in 1981 census). Population of the town from 1830 to 2021, based on religion, language and ethnicity was as follows:

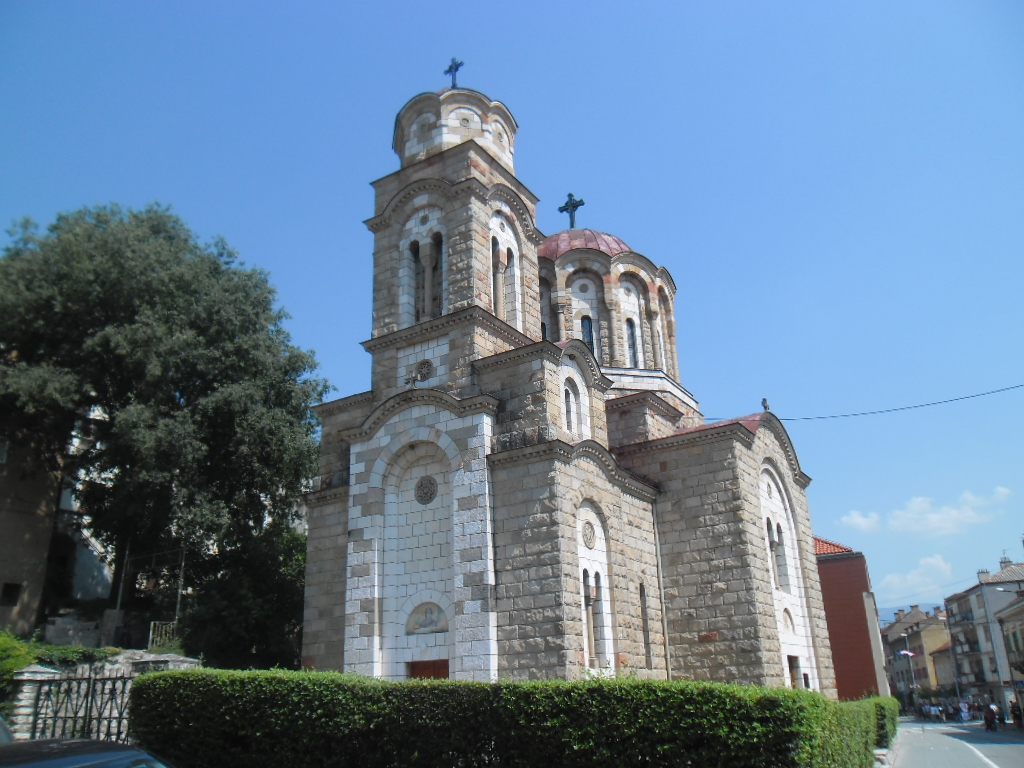
Serb Orthodox church of the Intercession of the Holy Virgin in Knin

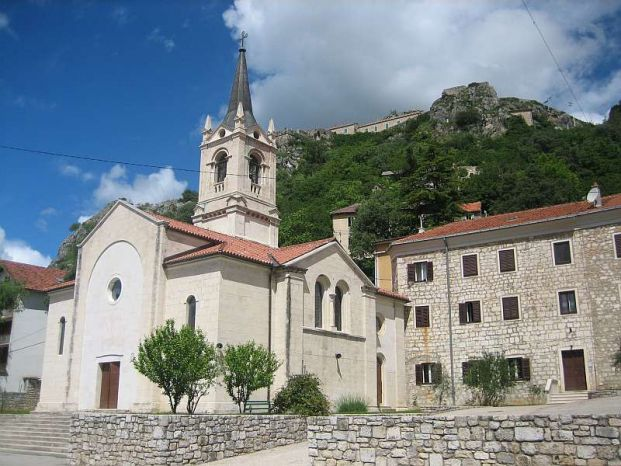
Roman Catholic church of St Anthony in Knin

Population structure by ethnicity 1948–2021
Year	Total	Croats	Serbs	Yugoslavs	Other
2021	11,633	8,936 (76.82%)	2,492 (21.42%)	0 (0%)	28 (0.24%)
2011	10,633	9,001 (84.65%)	1,429 (13.44%)	0 (0%)	203 (1.91%)
2001	11,128	9,546 (85.78%)	1,269 (11.40%)	0 (0%)	188 (1.68%)
1991	12,331	1,660 (13.46%)	9,867 (80.01%)	381 (3.08%)	423 (3.43%)
1981	10,933	1,701 (15.55%)	6,516 (59.59%)	2,421 (22.14%)	295 (2.69%)
1971	7,300	1,686 (23.09%)	4,972 (68.10%)	343 (4.69%)	299 (4.09%)
1961	5,116	1,671 (32.66%)	3,064 (59.89%)	81 (1.58%)	247 (4.82%)
1953	3,542	1,297 (36.6%)	2,015 (56.89%)	0 (0%)	230 (6.5%)
1948	2,683	1,210 (45.10%)	1,360 (50.69%)	0 (0%)	113 (4.21%)
1857	1,039	785 (75,55 %)	254 (24,44 %)	0 (0%)	69 (6.64%)

Population structure by religion and language use 1830–1910
Year	Total	Catholic	Orthodox	Serbo-Croatian	Italian	German	Other
1910	1,270	833 (65.60%)	433 (34.09%)	1,108	91	13	21
1900	1,302	835 (64.13%)	467 (35.87%)	1,107	114	6	15
1857	1,039	785 (75.55%)	254 (24.44%)	N/A	N/A	N/A	N/A
1830	644	518 (80.43%)	126 (19.57%)	N/A	N/A	N/A	N/A

== Archeology ==
The recently discovered Roman town Burnum is 18 km away from Knin in direction of Kistanje. There are the remains of the biggest amphitheater in Dalmatia built in 77 AD, during the rule of Emperor Vespasian which could host 8,000 people.

The nearby villages Biskupija and Kapitul are extremely interesting archeological sites from the 10th century where many remains of medieval Croatian culture are found including churches, graves, decorations, and epigraphs.

== Sport ==
The most successful sports in Knin lately have been track and field and martial arts. The latter is particularly popular with two taekwondo clubs active. Matea Jelić, Knin native (*1997) started practicing taekwando in Knin and later became 2020 Olympic champion in 67 kg. Track and field club "Sv. Ante" (St. Anthony) in Knin boasts Croatian 100m and 200m sprint as well as long jump national champion, Marko Čeko, who also won the Hanžeković memorial in 2020 in men's long jump.

The main football club in Knin is NK Dinara, formed in 1913. NK Dinara's colours were black and white until 2005 when the club changed its colours to red, white and blue. NK Dinara plays in the 4th, lowest division in Croatia, Šibenik-Knin County League (1. Županijska liga Šibensko-kninska).

Knin has a sports association which was formed in 1998. Basketball is also popular in Knin with an amateur women's and men's club playing in lower tiers. The Croatian National basketball team has played a match in Knin. They played against Israel in 1999 where Croatia won the match 78:68. Other sports played in Knin are rugby, handball, volleyball, kickboxing, karate, tennis and taekwondo.

In 2007 the Croatia national rugby union team beat an Irish Barbarians side to win their first ever trophy, the St. Patrick's Day Cup organised by Alan Moore in Knin.

== Transport ==
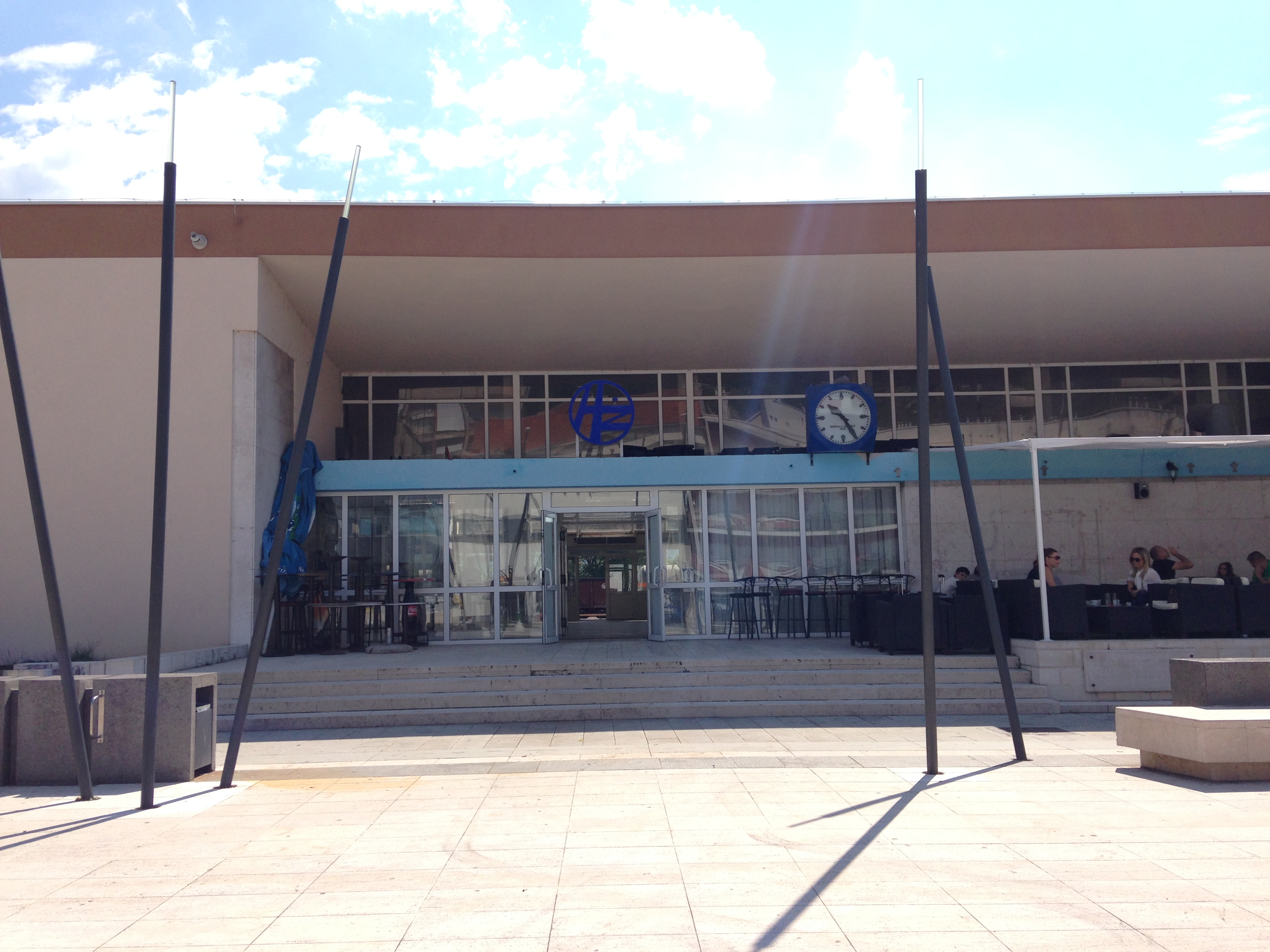
Knin railway station building

The most important intercity roadway in Knin is the Croatian state route D1. The route makes for easy access of Knin from the major coastal city of Split. The section of D1 from Knin to A1 highway will be upgraded to the expressway level in following years (with B1 expressway).

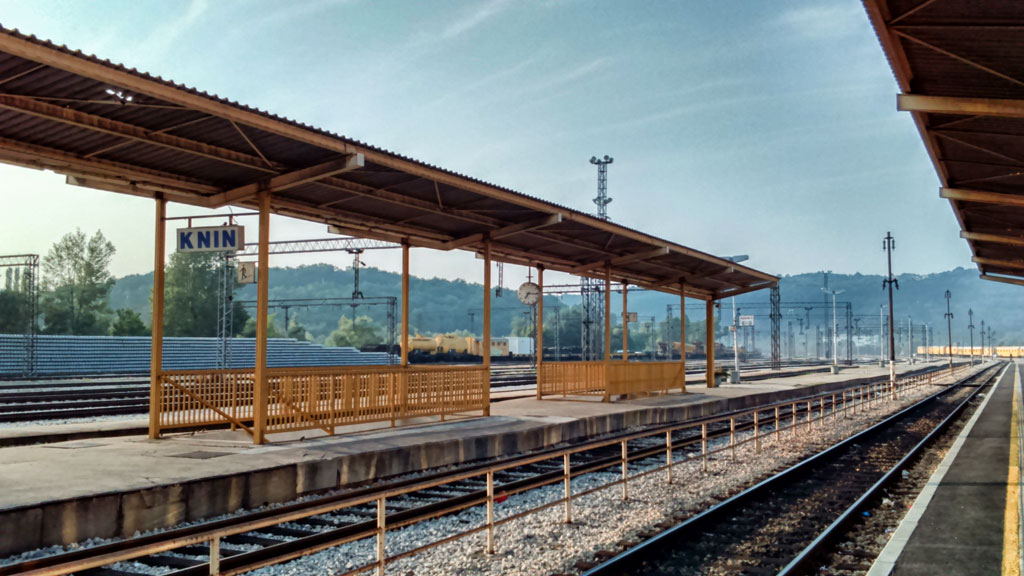
Knin railway station's platforms, notice the lack of catenary wires, and the presence of the poles only

Knin is also an important railway junction as the railroads from the rest of Dalmatia and its cities of Zadar, Split and Šibenik pass through Knin, going north to the capital city of Croatia, Zagreb, via M604 railway. There are four lines meeting in Knin station: to Perković (and then to Split or Šibenik), to Zadar, to Ogulin (and onwards to Karlovac, Zagreb) and to Martin Brod (and Bihać, Sisak, Zagreb). Only the former three lines offer passenger transport. The latter route, Knin-Bihać-Zagreb, passes through Bosnian territory, crossing the border many times, thus it is not used for passenger transport since the beginning of the war in 1991. However, it is the shortest route between Knin and Zagreb, and as such was electrified in 1984 (the catenary being subsequently destroyed by war operations in the early 1990s). Electrification had started from Yugoslav inland towards the coast and had only reached Knin, so today the Knin station sidings are equipped with overhead catenary, but lines leaving the town are not.

== Towns and villages in the municipality ==
In the 2021 census, the municipality contained the following settlements:

- Golubić, population 654
- Knin, population 8,262
- Kninsko Polje, population 758
- Kovačić, population 628
- Ljubač, population 51
- Oćestovo, population 78
- Plavno, population 121
- Polača, population 151
- Potkonje, population 66
- Radljevac, population 36
- Strmica, population 160
- Vrpolje, population 159
- Žagrović, population 509

== Notable people ==
- Ratko Adamović (b. 1942), Serbian writer
- Marija Ilić Agapova (1895–1984), Serbian librarian and translator
- Dragana Atlija (b. 1986), Miss Serbia 2009
- Milan Babić (1956–2006), 1st president of quasi-state Republic of Serbian Krajina and former mayor of Knin convicted for war crimes by ICTY
- Tina Barišić (b. 2000), Croatian handball player
- Nemanja Bezbradica (b. 1993), Serbian basketball player
- Darko Bjedov (b. 1989), Serbian footballer
- Gojko Bjedov (1913–1937), Yugoslav volunteer in the Spanish Civil War
- Kosta Bjedov (b. 1986), Serbian footballer
- Igor Bjelan (b. 1992), Serbian badminton player
- Valentina Blažević (b. 1994), Croatian handball player
- Milan Borjan (b. 1987), Canadian soccer player
- Dejan Borovnjak (b. 1986), Serbian basketball player
- Vladimir Buač (b. 1984), Croatian footballer and coach
- Frane Cota (1898–1951), Croatian sculptor at the 1924 Summer Olympics
- Jovan Damjanović (b. 1982), Serbian footballer and football manager
- Milan Damjanović (1943–2006), Yugoslav–Serbian footballer
- Miloš Degenek (b. 1994), Australian footballer
- Milica Deura (b. 1990), Bosnian basketball player
- Ognjen Dobrić (b. 1994), Serbian basketball player
- Marta Drpa (b. 1989), Serbian volleyball player
- Momčilo Đujić (1907–1999), Serbian Orthodox priest and Chetnik commander convicted of war crimes in absentia by SFRY
- Lazo Džepina (b. 1966), Croatian footballer and football manager
- Electra Elite, Serbian singer and sex worker
- Božena Erceg (b. 1981), Croatian basketball player
- Branko Grčić (b. 1964), Croatian politician and economist
- Aleksandar Gugleta (b. 1991), Serbian handball player
- Marko Jelić (b. 1976), Croatian biology professor and former mayor of Knin
- Matea Jelić (b. 1997), Croatian taekwondo athlete
- Vojin Jelić (1921–2004), Croatian Serb writer and poet
- Drago Kovačević (1953–2019), Serbian politician and writer and former mayor of Knin
- Leon Kreković (b. 2000), Croatian footballer
- Sava Lešić (b. 1988), Serbian basketball player
- Sasa Macura (b. 1991), Australian footballer
- Sanda Malešević (b. 1994), Serbian footballer
- Ljubomir Marić (b. 1977), Serbian and Kosovar politician
- Arsen Marjan (b. 1975), Serbian footballer
- Mirko Marjanović (1937–2006), former prime minister of Serbia
- Milan Martić (b. 1954), 3rd president of quasi-state Republic of Serbian Krajina convicted of war crimes by ICTY
- Bojan Miljuš (b. 1994), Serbian footballer
- Branko Miljuš (b. 1960), Croatian footballer
- Dejan Miljuš (b. 1994), Serbian footballer
- Lovro Monti (1835–1898), Dalmatian Italian politician
- Miloš Perišić (b. 1995), Serbian footballer
- Ilija Petković (1945–2020), Serbian footballer and football manager
- Zdravko Ponoš (b. 1962), Serbian politician, diplomat and retired general
- Hrvoje Požar (1916–1991), Croatian engineer
- Milan Pršo (b. 1990), Serbian footballer
- Jovan Radulović (1951–2018), Serbian writer
- Jovan Rašković (1929–1992), Croatian Serb psychiatrist and politician
- Josipa Rimac (b. 1980), former mayor of Knin
- Ljubomir Ristovski (b. 1969), Serbian footballer and football manager
- Bojan Sanković (b. 1993), Montenegrin footballer
- Anja Šimpraga (b. 1987), current deputy prime minister of Croatia
- Dinko Šimunović (1873–1933), Croatian writer
- Dalibor Škorić (b. 1971), Serbian footballer
- Dejan Sorgić (b. 1989), Swiss footballer
- Miloš Tintor (b. 1986), Serbian footballer
- Janko Veselinović (b. 1965), Serbian lawyer and professor of law
- Mladen Veselinović (b. 1992), Serbian footballer
- Vojislav Vranjković (b. 1983), Serbian footballer
- Soraja Vučelić (b. 1986), Serbian–Montenegrin model
- Radomir Vukčević (1941–2014), Yugoslav footballer
- Marija Vuković (b. 1992), Montenegrin high jumper
- Dušan Zelenbaba (b. 1952), Serbian physician and politician
- Vladimir Zelenbaba (b. 1982), Serbian footballer
- Nemanja Zelenović (b. 1990), Serbian handball player
- Milan Zorica (b. 1992), Serbian footballer

== Twin town ==
- Zugló, Hungary, since 2016

== See also ==
- Church of Saint Anthony, Knin

== Sources ==
- "Application of the Convention on the Prevention and Punishment of the Crime of Genocide (Croatia v. Serbia)" (PDF). Archived from the original (PDF) on 13 December 2016.
- "Croatia: Impunity for abuses committed during "Operation Storm" and the denial of the right of refugees to return to the Krajina" (PDF). Human Rights Watch. August 1996.
- Dizdar, Zdravko; Sobolevski, Mihajlo (1999). Prešućivani četnički zločini u Hrvatskoj i u Bosni i Hercegovini 1941–1945 [Suppressed Chetnik Crimes in Croatia and Bosnia and Herzegovina 1941–1945]. Zagreb: Croatian Institute of History. ISBN 978-953-6491-28-5.
- Gunjača, Stjepan (June 1949). "O položaju kninske katedrale" (PDF). Starohrvatska Prosvjeta (in Croatian). III (1). Knin: Museum of Croatian Archaeological Monuments: 38–86.
- Gunjača, Stjepan (September 1960). "Tiniensia archaeologica historica topographica II" (PDF). Starohrvatska Prosvjeta (in Croatian). III (7). Knin: Museum of Croatian Archaeological Monuments: 7–142.
- Šimunović, Petar (March 2013). "Predantički toponimi u današnjoj (i povijesnoj) Hrvatskoj" [Pre-Roman placenames in present-day (and historical) Croatia] (PDF). Folia onomastica Croatica (in Croatian) (22). Zagreb: Croatian Academy of Sciences and Arts: 147–214.
