= Sanda Malešević =

Serbian footballer (born 1994)

Personal information
- Date of birth: 22 April 1994 (age 32)
- Place of birth: Knin, Croatia
- Position: Midfielder

Senior career*
Years	Team	Apps	(Gls)
2007–2008	Sloga Zemun	24	(5)
2008–2011	LASK Lazarevac	68	(19)
2011–2020	Spartak Subotica	189	(39)
2020–2021	Alavés	29	(2)
2021–2022	Czarni Sosnowiec	21	(6)

International career^{‡}
- Serbia
- * Club domestic league appearances and goals as of 19:10, 30 August 2019 (UTC) ‡ National team caps and goals as of 19:10, 30 August 2019 (UTC)

Sanda Malešević (Serbian Cyrillic: Санда Малешевић; born 22 April 1994) is a Serbian footballer who plays as a midfielder and has appeared for the Serbia women's national team.

== Career ==
Malešević has been capped for the Serbia national team, appearing for the team during the 2019 FIFA Women's World Cup qualifying cycle.
