= Radljevac =

- Village
- Location of Radljevac in Croatia
- Coordinates: 44°7′22″N 16°9′46″E
- Country: Croatia
- County: Šibenik-Knin County
- City: Knin

Area
  - Total: 13.5 km^{2} (5.2 sq mi)

Population (2021)
  - Total: 36
  - Density: 2.7/km^{2} (6.9/sq mi)
- Time zone: UTC+1 (CET)
  - Summer (DST): UTC+2 (CEST)
- Postal code: 22301
- Area code: + 385 (0)22

Radljevac is a village in the hinterland of Dalmatia, Croatia, located in Šibenik-Knin County near the town of Knin. As of 2011, the population counted 75 inhabitants.
