= Vrpolje, Knin =

Vrpolje
- Village
- Location within Croatia
- Coordinates: 44°4′12″N 16°13′46″E
- Country: Croatia
- County: Šibenik-Knin
- Municipality: Knin

Area
  - Total: 17.9 km^{2} (6.9 sq mi)

Population (2021)
  - Total: 159
  - Density: 8.88/km^{2} (23.0/sq mi)
- Time zone: UTC+1 (CET)
  - Summer (DST): UTC+2 (CEST)
- Postal code: 22300
- Area code: 022

Vrpolje is a village in municipality of Knin in Šibenik-Knin County, Croatia.
