= Church of Saint Anthony, Knin =

Church of Saint Anthony
- Crkva svetog Ante
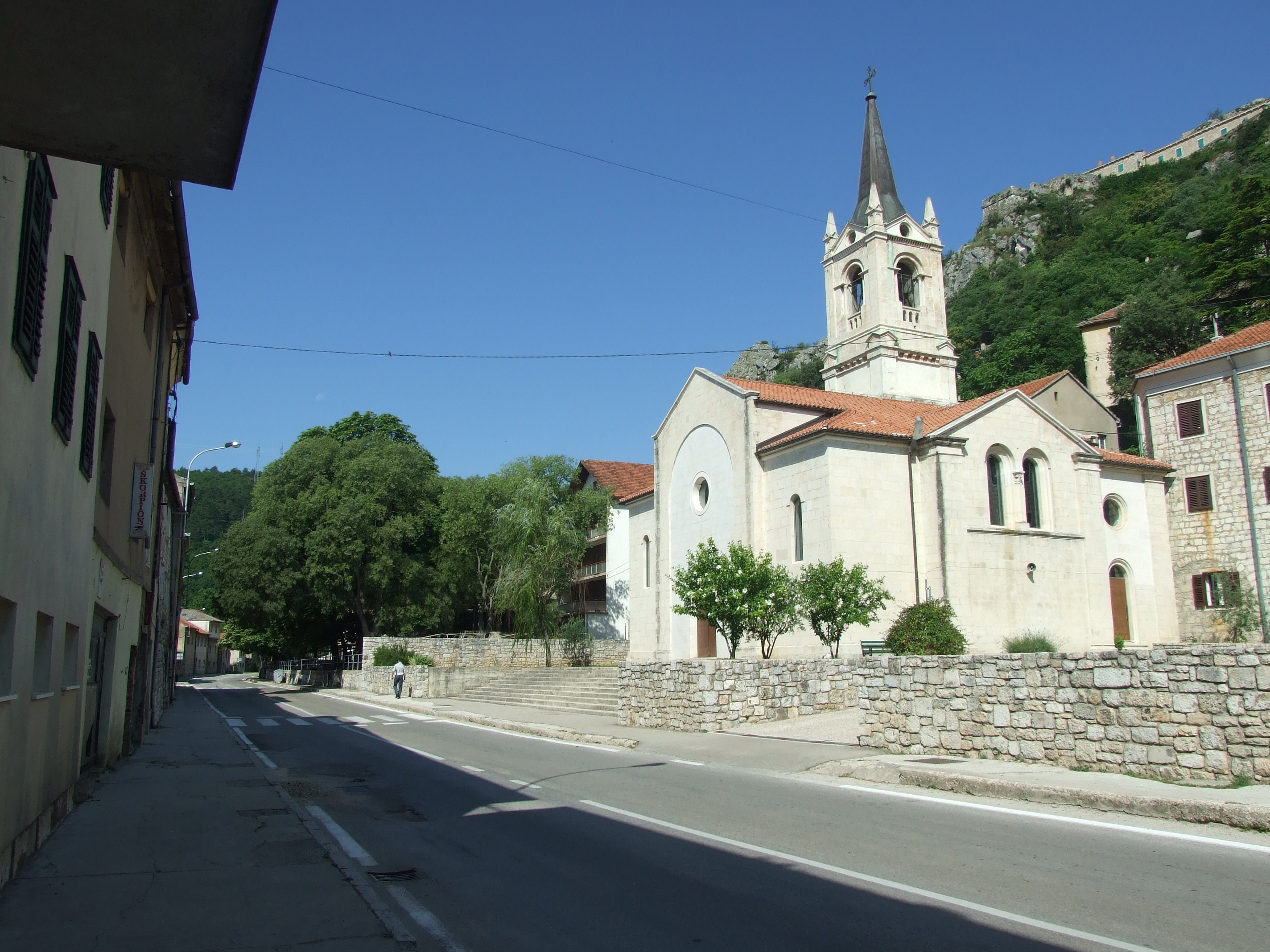
- Church of Saint Anthony
- Location: Knin
- Country: Croatia
- Denomination: Roman Catholic

History
- Status: Parish church
- Dedication: Saint Anthony of Padua

Architecture
- Functional status: Active
- Groundbreaking: 1860
- Completed: 1863; 163 years ago

Administration
- Diocese: Diocese of Šibenik
- Parish: Parish of Saint Anthony of Padua - Knin

The Church of Saint Anthony (Croatian: Crkva svetog Ante) is a Roman Catholic church in Knin, Croatia.

== History ==
Construction of church started in 1860, and was completed in 1863. During World War II, the church sustained some damage due to bombings. It completed renovations in 1960.

During the Croatian War of Independence, the church was completely destroyed by rebel Serbs. After the war, the Franciscans started with renovation of monastery and church. The new church was re-dedicated on 6 December 1998.
