= Golubić, Šibenik-Knin County =

Golubić
- Village
- Interactive map of Golubić
- Location of Golubić in Croatia
- Coordinates: 44°5′55″N 16°13′22″E
- Country: Croatia
- County: Šibenik-Knin County
- City: Obrovac

Area
  - Total: 50.3 km^{2} (19.4 sq mi)

Population (2021)
  - Total: 654
  - Density: 13.0/km^{2} (33.7/sq mi)
- Time zone: UTC+1 (CET)
  - Summer (DST): UTC+2 (CEST)
- Postal code: 22301 Golubić
- Area code: + 385 (0)22

Golubić (Serbian Cyrillic: Голубић) is a village located 9 km north of Knin, in the continental part of Šibenik-Knin County, Croatia. Situated along the river Krka, on the location existed an early medieval Carolingian church, and the village was initially mentioned as Butina Vas, and since early 18th century as Golubić. The Golubić Hydroelectric Power Plant exists at the near Butižnica river.

== History ==
=== Early ===
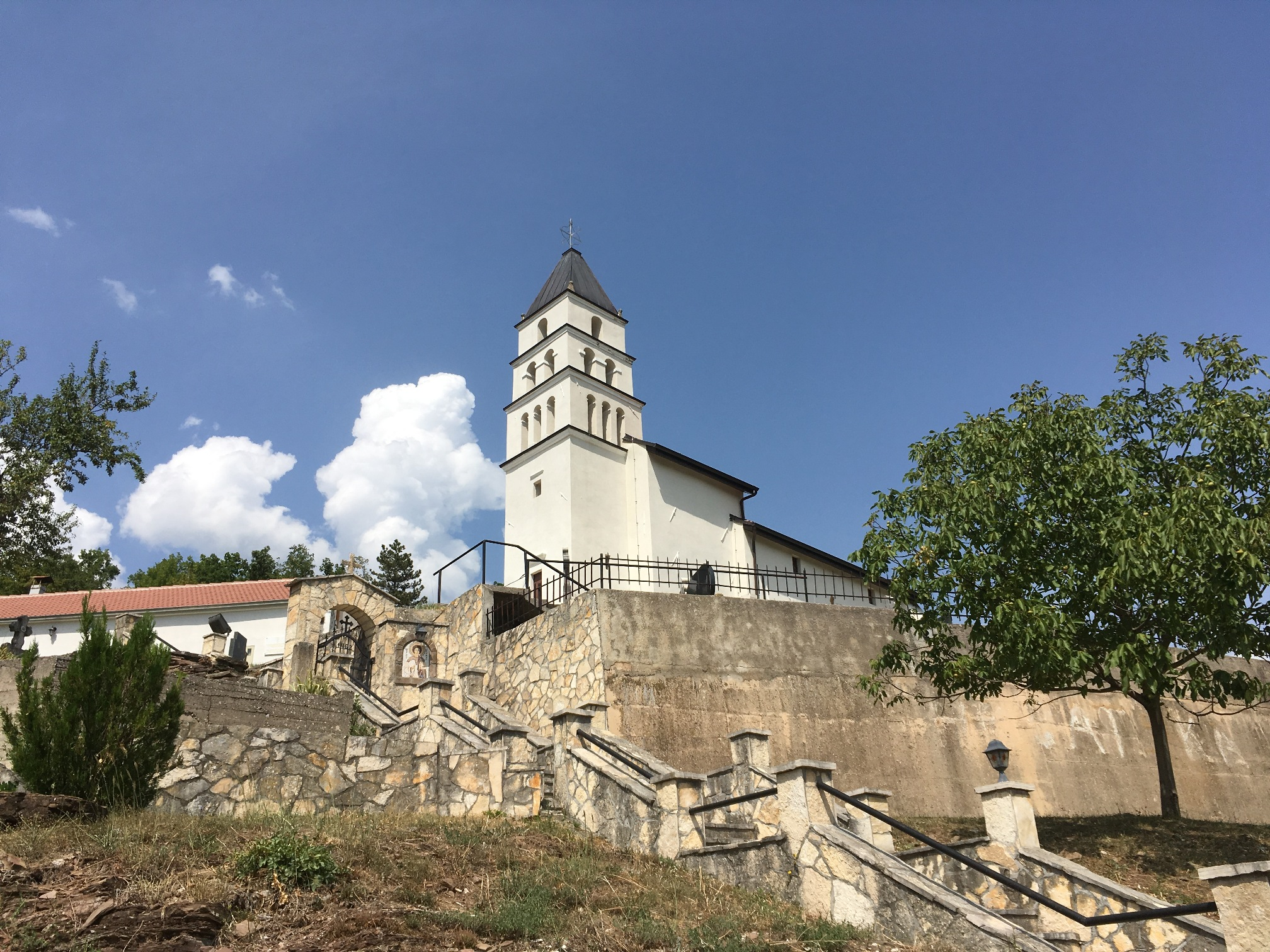
Serbian Orthodox Church of St. Stephen

The settlement is regarded as an "important locality from the Croatian Early Middle Ages". Of particular importance is the present day Orthodox Church of St. Stephen, where pre-Romanesque reliefs were discovered, along with the reduced remains of a westwork, dating to the early 9th century and later to the period of Branimir, Duke of Croatia (879–c. 892), demonstrating the existence of one of "the earliest Carolingian churches in Croatia" (possibly dedicated to St. Mary and St. Stephen). In the village were also found golden and silver jewellery also dating back to the early medieval period.

In the 14-15th century, the village itself was known as "Butina Vas", and was inhabited by Croatian noblemen (incl. Stjepan Bujzin, Nikola Merdešić, Petar and Ivan Forčić). With the Ottoman conquest in the early 16th century, it became part of the Croatian vilayet and then the Sanjak of Klis. Back then, it was also mentioned as Putna Vast, separately from the nearby hamlets of Blaca and Golubić with Forčić, and since 1585 as "Donja Vas with Komalić", in 1604 as "Golubić with Donja Vas and Komalić" with Blaca mentioned separately, since 1701 as "Golubić with Blaca", and since 1718-1729 only as "Golubić" (Golubich).

In the 1528-1530 Ottoman defter, as part of the nahiye of Kosovo field (near Knin), the village Golubić with Forčića Ambar and Butina Vast had 23 houses, the village Blaca had 25 houses, and again Butina Vast and Komalić had 9 houses. In 1540 they are mentioned as a baština (heritage) of Ivaniš, Tomaš and Marijan Forčić. In the 1550 Ottoman defter, the village Golubić with Koričić had 12 houses, Blatce had 14 houses with a baština, and Putna Vast with 5 houses that was the heritage of Ivaniš Kumalić, Tomaš and Marijan Forčić, and all of them were now part of the nahiye of Strmica and djamaat of knez Ljubinko of Milašin. In 1636 the village was recorded to be inhabited by 300 Roman Catholics. In 1681, there were 109 families with 1003 people. After the Morean War (1699) additional migrations occurred, and it was re-settled by a new population.

=== Modern ===
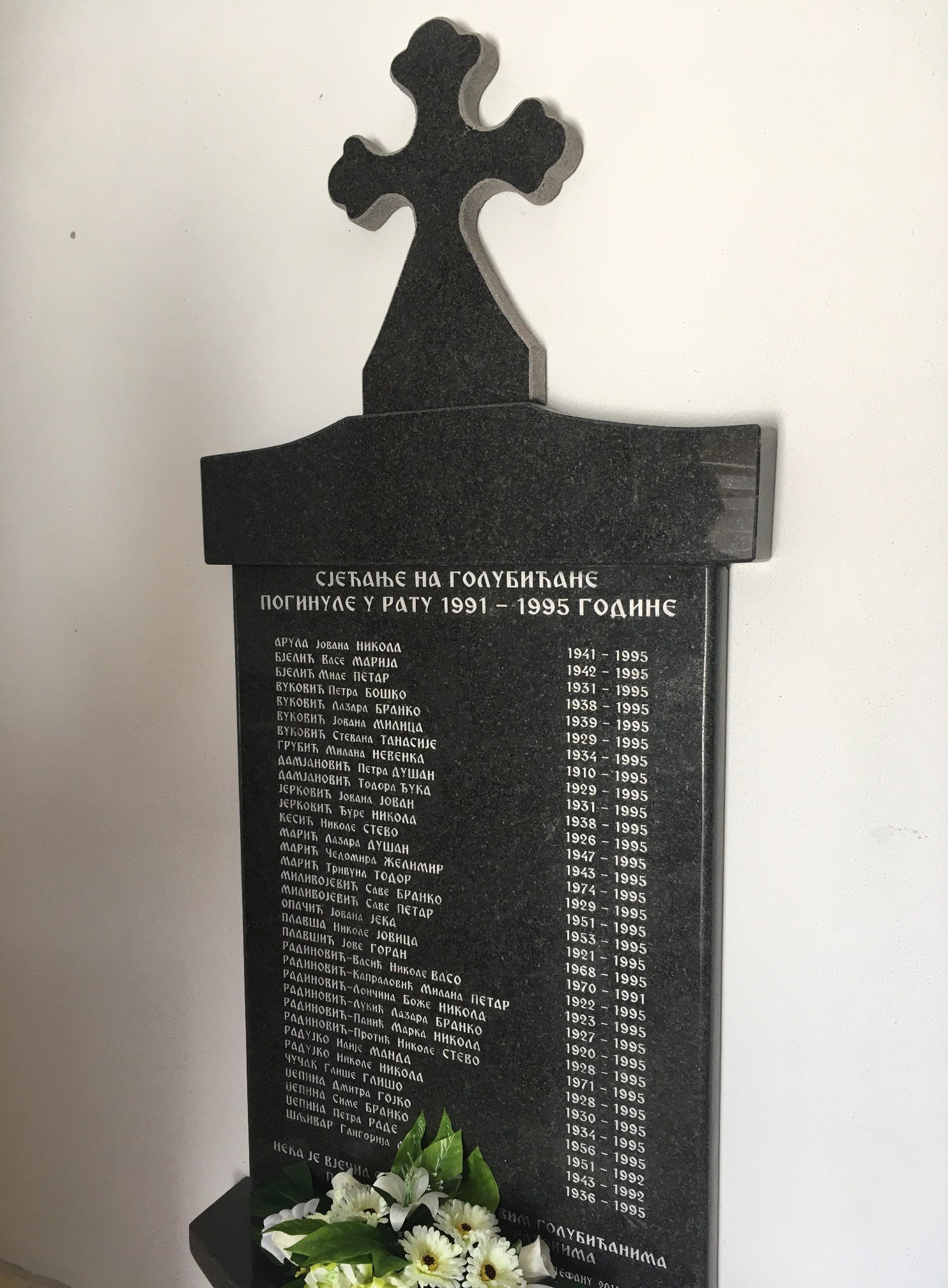
A memorial dedicated to Serb victims from the Croatian War of Independence.

During the Croatian War of Independence, the village was held by Serb troops, which established military camp led by Dragan Vasiljković, suspected for maltreatments of Croatian captives in Knin camp. After the fall of Serbian Krajina, most Serbs left the village, and Bosnian Croats settled here.

At least 19 Serb civilians from the village were massacred on 6 August 1995 during the Croatian Army's Operation Storm. A monument was built outside the church commemorating the victims and it contains the names of 34 people killed during the war. On October 2, 2011, the Croatian government issued a ban on a commemoration gathering, ordering the church to remove the monument as "two thirds of the place that the monument was built on belong to the state and that only one third belongs to the Serbian Orthodox Church (SPC)." and "the ban has removed danger of bigger incidents and unrest".

=== Church ===
The church was shown on a Venetian map published by Matteo Pagano in 1530, and possibly renovated in 1681. Nikodim Milaš claimed that the Serbian Orthodox Church of St. Stephen was built in 1462, with the original claim possibly dating to the mid-18th century. The medieval Roman Catholic church was converted to Orthodoxy in the mid-16th century or perhaps later.

In 1692, it served as the seat of the Dalmatian bishop Vasilije I. In 1774, Serbian philosopher Dositej Obradović was a teacher in the village.

== Demographics ==
- 1961 census, total 2243 people.
- 1971 census, total 1885 people.
- 1981 census, total 1617 people.
- 1991 census, total 1424 people. 1389 Serbs, 17 Croats, 1 Yugoslav, 1 Muslim, 16 others.
- 2001 census, total 654 people.
- 2011 census, total 132 people.

== Notable people ==
- Zdravko Ponoš, former Chief of the General Staff of the Serbian Armed Forces
