= Potkonje =

- Location within Croatia
- Coordinates: 44°01′13″N 16°12′26″E
- Country: Croatia
- County: Šibenik-Knin
- City: Knin

Area
  - Total: 2.6 km^{2} (1.0 sq mi)

Population (2021)
  - Total: 66
  - Density: 25/km^{2} (66/sq mi)
- Time zone: UTC+1 (CET)
  - Summer (DST): UTC+2 (CEST)

Potkonje is a village in the hinterland of Dalmatia, Croatia, located in Šibenik-Knin County near the town of Knin. In 2011, the population counted 110 inhabitants.
