= 264th Infantry Division =

- 264. Infanterie-Division
- Active: 20 May 1943 – 7 May 1945
- Country: Nazi Germany
- Branch: Army
- Type: Infantry
- Size: Division
- Engagements: World War II

The 264th Infantry Division German: 264th Infanterie-Division was an infantry division of the German Heer during World War II created on 20 May 1943 in Rouen. It was transferred to Yugoslavia in October 1943, where it was destroyed during the Battle of Knin in winter 1944-1945.

== Commanding officers ==
- Generalleutnant Albin Nake (1 June 1943 - 18 April 1944)
- Generalleutnant Otto-Joachim Lüdecke (18 April 1944 - 15 May 1944)
- General der Infanterie Martin Gareis (15 May 1944 - 25 September 1944)
- Generalmajor Paul Hermann (25 September 1944 - 9 October 1944)
- Generalmajor Alois Windisch (9 October 1944 - 5 December 1944 Division destroyed)
