= Arsen Marjan =

Serbian footballer

Personal information
- Full name: Arsen Marjan
- Date of birth: 20 October 1975 (age 51)
- Place of birth: Knin, SR Croatia, SFR Yugoslavia
- Height: 1.90 m (6 ft 3 in)
- Position: Defender

Youth career
- Dinara

Senior career*
Years	Team	Apps	(Gls)
1996–1998	Milicionar	23	(1)
1998–2002	Zvezdara	77	(7)
2002–2003	Apollon Limassol	23	(0)
2003	Železnik	1	(0)
2004	Beograd	12	(2)
2004–2005	Radnički Beograd	23	(0)
2005	Zeta	13	(0)
2006–2007	Panserraikos	36	(1)
2007–2008	Ilisiakos	25	(0)
2008–2009	Fostiras		
2009–2010	Anagennisi Karditsa	28	(1)
2011	Palilulac Beograd	0	(0)
Total		261	(12)

Managerial career
- 2021: Baćevac Struja
- * Club domestic league appearances and goals

Arsen Marjan (Serbian Cyrillic: Арсен Марјан; born 20 October 1975) is a Serbian retired footballer who played as a defender.

== Career ==
After starting out at his hometown club Dinara, Marjan joined Belgrade-based club Milicionar. He subsequently played with Zvezdara and helped them win promotion to the First League of FR Yugoslavia in the 2000–01 season, before moving abroad to Cyprus in 2002. After one season abroad, Marjan returned to Serbia and Montenegro, spending the next three years playing for Železnik, Beograd, Radnički Beograd, and Zeta. He moved abroad for the second time in early 2006, joining Greek club Panserraikos. While in Greece, Marjan also played for Ilisiakos, Fostiras, and Anagennisi Karditsa.

== Honours ==
Zvezdara

- Second League of FR Yugoslavia: 2000–01
