= Polača, Šibenik-Knin County =

Polača
- Village
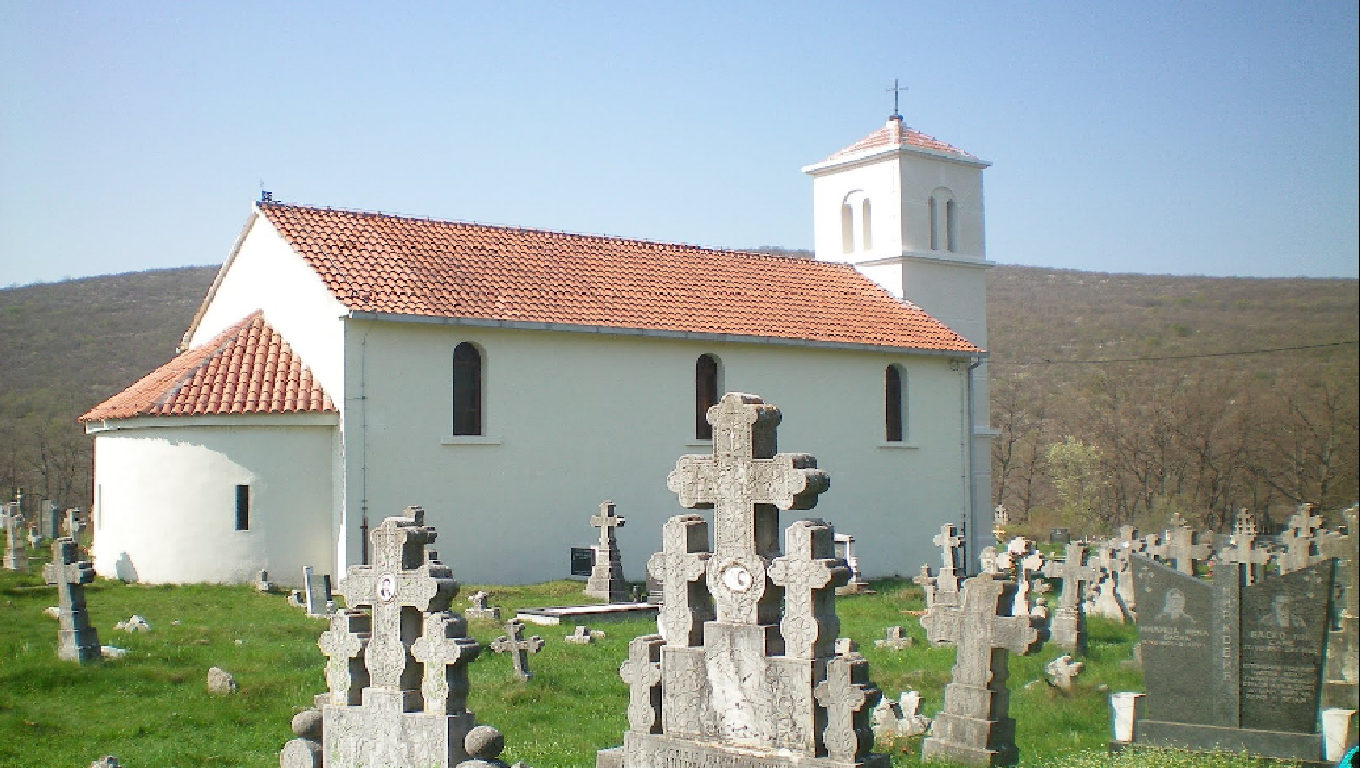

- Location of Polača in Croatia
- Coordinates: 44°00′31″N 16°18′54″E
- Country: Croatia
- Region: Adriatic Croatia
- County: Šibenik-Knin County
- Municipality: Knin

Area
  - Total: 92.6 km^{2} (35.8 sq mi)
- Elevation: 531 m (1,742 ft)

Population (2021)
  - Total: 151
  - Density: 1.63/km^{2} (4.22/sq mi)
- Time zone: UTC+1 (CET)
  - Summer (DST): UTC+2 (CEST)
- Postal code: 22302 Polača
- Area code: + 385 (0)22

Polača is a village in Croatia, in the municipality of Knin, Šibenik-Knin County.

== Demographics ==
According to the 2011 census, the village of Polača has 210 inhabitants. This represents 13.24% of its pre-war population according to the 1991 census.

The 1991 census recorded that 99.43% of the village population were ethnic Serbs (1577/1586), 0.32% were ethnic Croats (5/1586) and 0.25% were of other ethnic origin (4/1586).

Historical population 1857-2011
v

population	1095	1389	1140	1420	1670	1935	1885	1993	2001	2045	1990	1834	1567	1586	134	210
	1857	1869	1880	1890	1900	1910	1921	1931	1948	1953	1961	1971	1981	1991	2001	2011

Sources: Croatian Bureau of Statistics publications

== Notable people ==
- Jovan Radulović
