= Ljubač, Šibenik-Knin County =

Ljubač
- Village
- Location of Ljubač in Croatia
- Coordinates: 44°02′09″N 16°10′17″E
- Country: Croatia
- County: Šibenik-Knin County
- City: Knin

Area
  - Total: 7.9 km^{2} (3.1 sq mi)

Population (2021)
  - Total: 51
  - Density: 6.5/km^{2} (17/sq mi)
- Time zone: UTC+1 (CET)
  - Summer (DST): UTC+2 (CEST)
- Postal code: 22301
- Area code: + 385 (0)22

Ljubač is a village near Knin, Šibenik-Knin County, Croatia.
