= Otrić =

Coordinates: 44°15′N 16°04′E

Otrić Отрић (Serbian)
- Village
- Interactive map of Otrić
- Country: Croatia
- County: Zadar County
- Municipality: Gračac

Area
  - Total: 21.0 km^{2} (8.1 sq mi)

Population (2021)
  - Total: 17
  - Density: 0.81/km^{2} (2.1/sq mi)
- Time zone: UTC+1 (CET)
  - Summer (DST): UTC+2 (CEST)

Otrić is a village in Croatia. It is connected by the D1 highway.

== Gallery ==
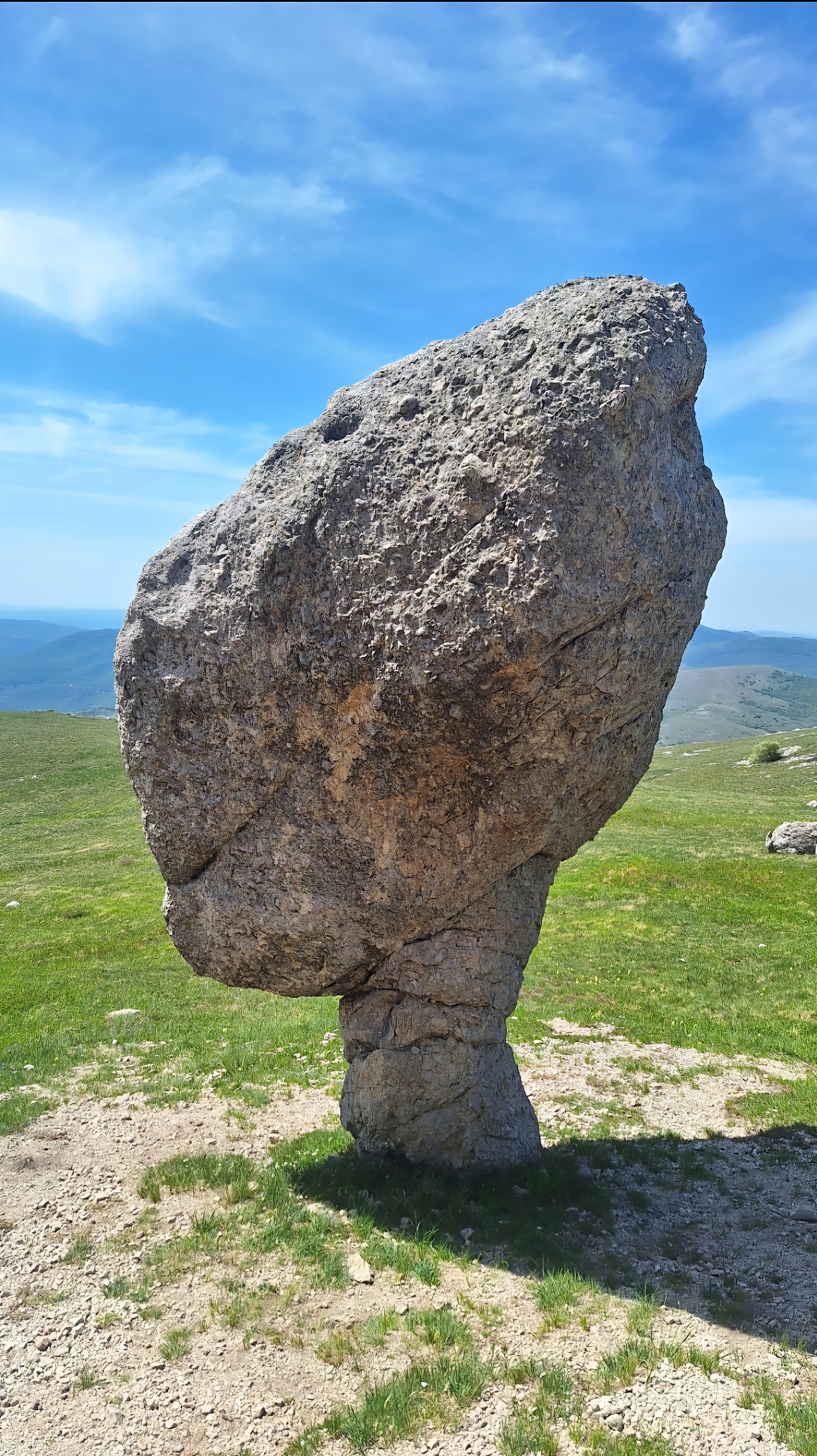
Marsovac formation on nearby Poštak
