= Oćestovo =

- Village
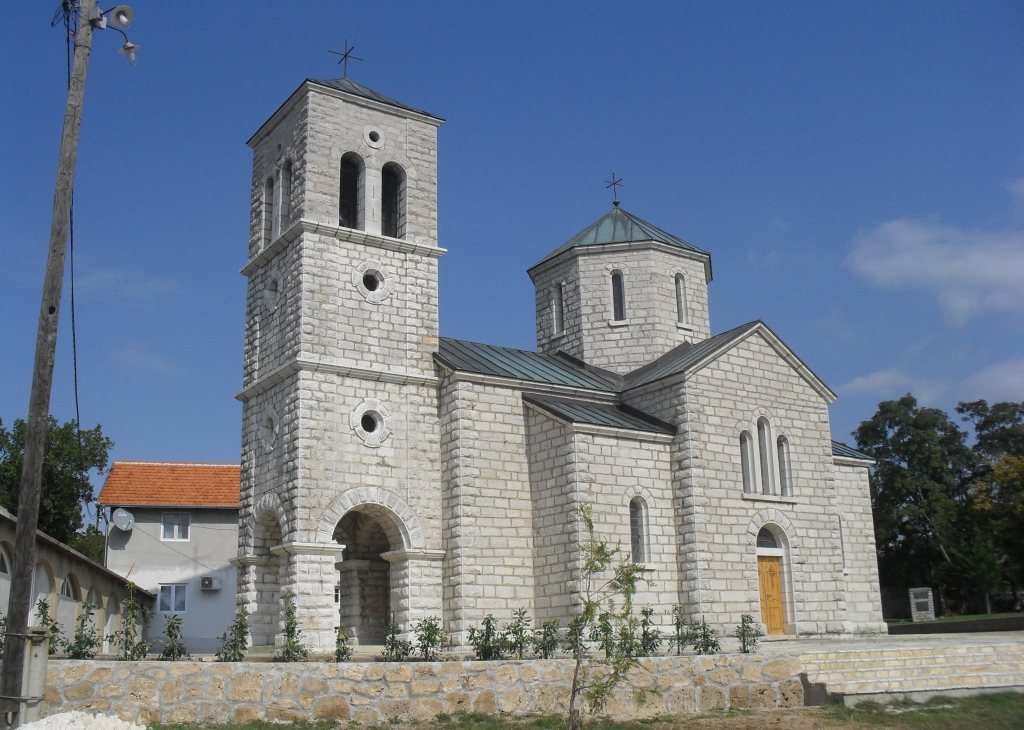

- Location within Croatia
- Coordinates: 44°03′28″N 16°07′35″E
- Country: Croatia
- County: Šibenik-Knin
- Municipality: Knin

Area
  - Total: 18.1 km^{2} (7.0 sq mi)

Population (2021)
  - Total: 78
  - Density: 4.3/km^{2} (11/sq mi)
- Time zone: UTC+1 (CET)
  - Summer (DST): UTC+2 (CEST)
- Postal code: 22300
- Area code: 022

Oćestovo is a village in municipality of Knin in Šibenik-Knin County, Croatia. It is located 5 km (3.1 mi) northwest of Knin.
