= Plavno, Croatia =

Plavno
- Village
- Location of Plavno in Croatia
- Coordinates: 44°09′01″N 16°10′49″E
- Country: Croatia
- Region: Adriatic Croatia
- County: Šibenik-Knin County
- Municipality: Knin

Area
  - Total: 64.5 km^{2} (24.9 sq mi)

Population (2021)
  - Total: 121
  - Density: 1.88/km^{2} (4.86/sq mi)
- Time zone: UTC+1 (CET)
  - Summer (DST): UTC+2 (CEST)
- Postal code: 22317 Plavno
- Area code: + 385 (0)22

Plavno is a village in Croatia, in the municipality of Knin, Šibenik-Knin County.

== Name ==
The name of this village means "blue" in the Serbian language.

== Demographics ==
According to the 2011 census, the village of Plavno has 253 inhabitants. This represents 14.71% of its pre-war population according to the 1991 census.

The 1991 census recorded that 99.30% of the village population were ethnic Serbs (1708/1720), 0.18% were Yugoslavs (3/1720) and 0.52% were of other ethnic origin (9/1720).

Historical population 1857-2011
v

population	1731	1825	1680	1984	2059	2294	2059	2403	2573	2719	2519	2414	1925	1720	266	253
	1857	1869	1880	1890	1900	1910	1921	1931	1948	1953	1961	1971	1981	1991	2001	2011

Sources: Croatian Bureau of Statistics publications
