= Jovan Radulović =

Serbian writer

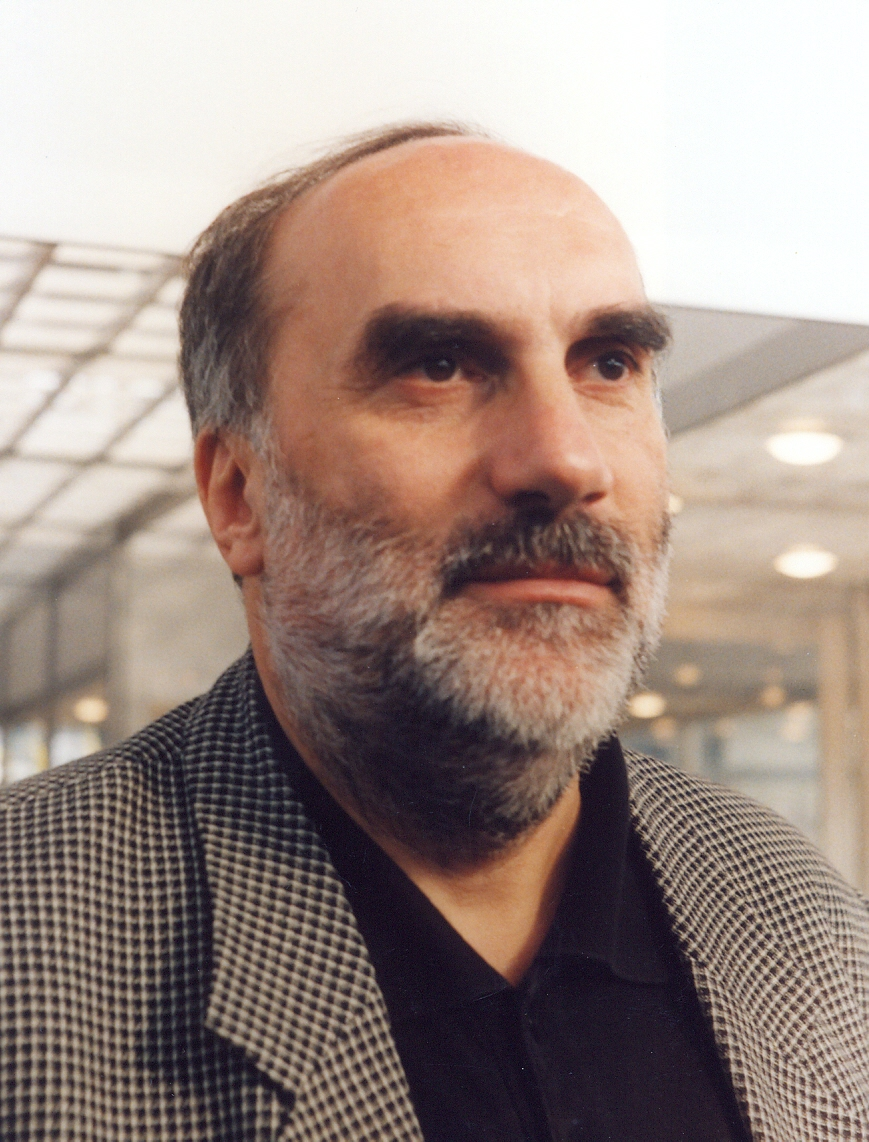
- Radulović in 2003
- Born: 29 September 1951; Polača, FPR Yugoslavia
- Died: 7 March 2018 (aged 66); Belgrade, Serbia
- Education: University of Belgrade Faculty of Philology
- Occupations: Writer, publicist, administrator
- Awards: A number of literary awards in Serbia

Signature
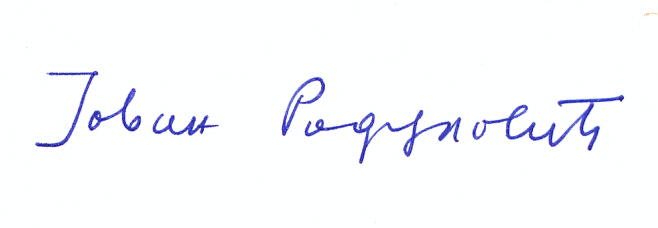

Jovan Radulović (Serbian Cyrillic: Јован Радуловић; 29 September 1951 – 7 March 2018) was a Serbian writer and former director of the Belgrade City Library.

Radulović's writing primarily deals with life and history of Serbs of Croatia. Several works authored by Radulović have been turned into films by Zdravko Šotra.

He was awarded the Andrić Prize in 1988 for his short story collection Dalje od oltara.

== Works ==
- Ilinštak, short story collection
- Golubnjača, short story collection
- Dalje od oltara, short story collection
- Idealan plac, short story collection
- Mama vrana, tata vrana i deca vrane, short story collection
- Vučari Donje i Gornje Polače, TV drama
- Braća po materi, novel
- Od Ognjene do Blage Marije, novel
- Prošao život, novel
- Golubnjača, drama
- Učitelj Dositej, drama
- Po srpskoj Dalmaciji, essays
- Zrna iz pleve, essays
- Uroniti u maticu života, short story collection
- Sumnjiva sahrana, short story collection
- U Islamu Grčkom, short story collection
- Zamka za zeca, children literature
- Stare i nove priče, short story collection
- Nema Veronike i druge priče, short story collection
- Bora pod okupacijom, drama
- Slučaj Golubnjača - za i protiv, documents
- Izabrane pripovijetke, short story collection
- Najlepše pripovetke Jovana Radulovića, short story collection
- Glava šećera, screenplay, (1990)
- Svirač, screenplay, (1998)
- Stari vruskavac, screenplay, (2000)
