= Kninsko Polje =

- Village
- Location of Kninsko Polje in Croatia
- Coordinates: 44°03′35″N 16°12′55″E
- Country: Croatia
- County: Šibenik-Knin County
- City: Knin

Area
  - Total: 10.6 km^{2} (4.1 sq mi)

Population (2021)
  - Total: 758
  - Density: 71.5/km^{2} (185/sq mi)
- Time zone: UTC+1 (CET)
  - Summer (DST): UTC+2 (CEST)
- Postal code: 22301
- Area code: + 385 (0)22

Kninsko Polje is a village near Knin, Šibenik-Knin County, Croatia.
