= Kninska Krajina =

Region of Dalmatian Hinterland, Croatia

Historical regions of Dalmatian Hinterland

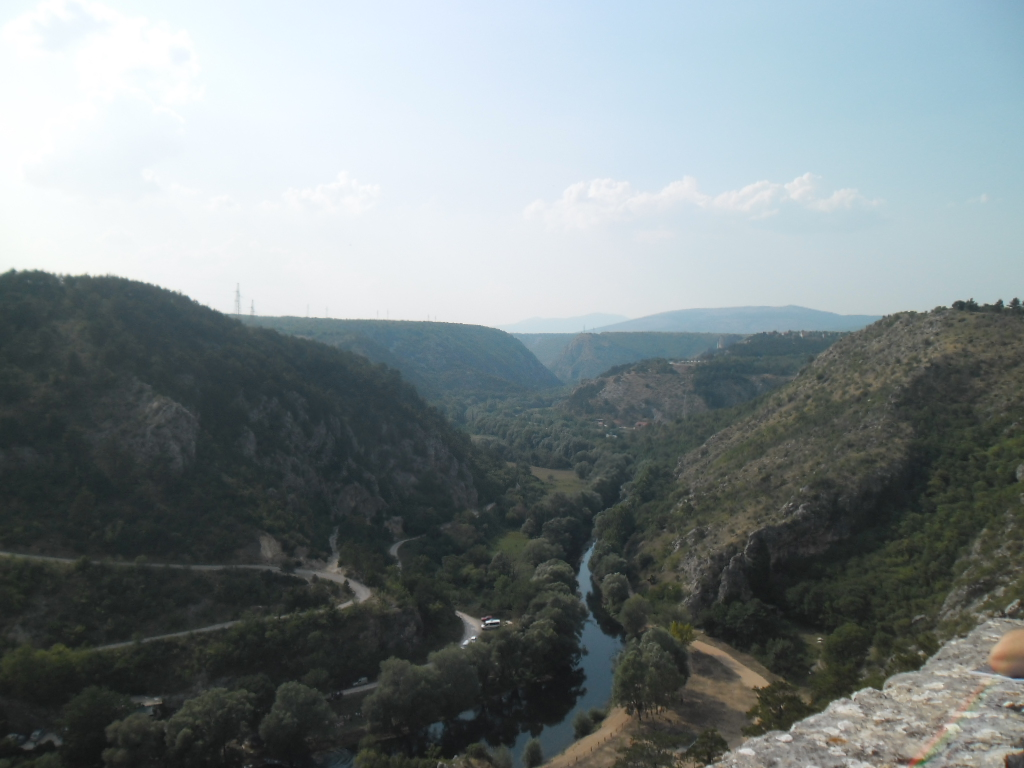
Karst terrain of Kninska Krajina

Kninska Krajina (Serbian Cyrillic: Книнска Крајина) is a geographical and historical region in Dalmatian Hinterland in Croatia, centered around the town of Knin.

== Geography ==
Kninska Krajina is situated between Bukovica in the southwest, Lika in the northwest, Drniška Krajina in the south, Cetinska Krajina in the southeast, and Završje (Bosnia and Herzegovina) in the east.

== History ==
=== Middle Ages ===
In the 6th century, the region was settled by Slavs (Sklavenoi). Knin itself was first mentioned by Byzantine Emperor Constantine Porphyrogenitus (r. 913–959) as the centre of a parish under Croatian rule. At the request of King Peter Krešimir IV of Croatia (r. 1058–1075), Knin became an episcopal see and the bishop of Knin held a title bishop of Croats (episcopus Chroatorum). Demetrius Zvonimir of Croatia (r. 1075–1089) was seated in the town.

In the 15th century, the Ottoman Empire occupied the area resulting in most of the native population fleeing the region. It was largely abandoned and devastated as the Ottoman army advanced towards the north and west. The region was administrated into the Sanjak of Kirka.

=== Modern period ===
In 1990, the Serbian autonomous region known as SAO Kninska Krajina was established with a local government, named after this geographical region. This region, along with other Serb-inhabited autonomous regions were merged to form the Republic of Serbian Krajina which sought to remain in union with Serbia and Montenegro upon Croatia's proclamation of independence in 1991. The area was ethnically cleansed of non-Serbs. In 1995, the Croatian army retook the region in Operation Storm, and the majority of the Serb population was ethnically cleansed or was displaced. Today, the region is sparsely populated due to few economic opportunities.

== See also ==
- Geography of Croatia
