= Strmica, Croatia =

Strmica
- Village
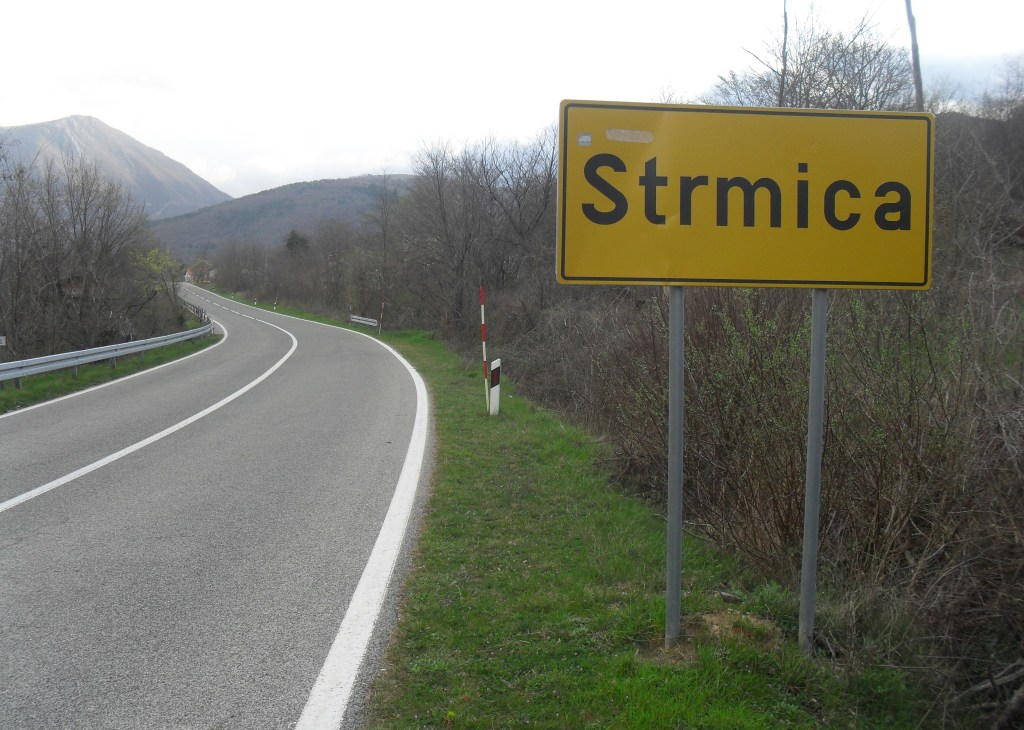
- Traffic sign at the village entrance

- Location of Strmica in Croatia
- Coordinates: 44°10′09″N 16°15′39″E
- Country: Croatia
- County: Šibenik-Knin County

Area
  - Total: 30.5 km^{2} (11.8 sq mi)

Population (2021)
  - Total: 160
  - Density: 5.2/km^{2} (14/sq mi)
- Time zone: UTC+1 (CET)
  - Summer (DST): UTC+2 (CEST)
- Postal code: 22311 Strmica
- Area code: + 385 (0)22

Strmica is a small village in the Knin Municipality. It is located north of Knin, just south of the border to Bosnia and Herzegovina. The population is 160 (census 2021).
