= Cathedral of Saint Bartholomew in Kapitul =

Destroyed medieval cathedral near Knin, Croatia

Knin Cathedral
- Church of Saint Bartholomew in Kapitul
- Crkva svetog Bartolomeja na Kapitulu
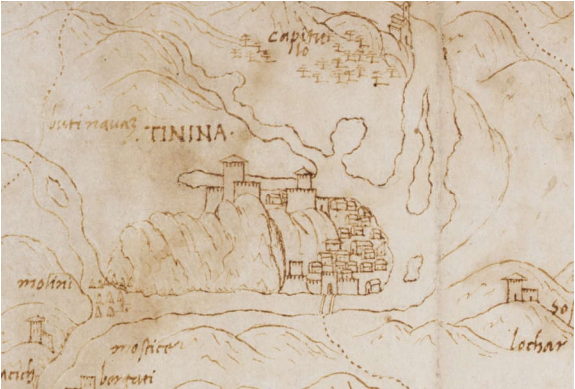
- A 16th century Venetian map, showing the cathedral in the upper right corner
- Knin Cathedral
- 44°01′42″N 16°12′25″E
- Location: Knin
- Country: Croatia
- Denomination: Catholic

History
- Founder: Dobroslav of Knin
- Dedication: Saint Bartholomew
- Dedicated: 1380s

Architecture
- Functional status: Destroyed
- Architectural type: Cathedral
- Style: Romanesque
- Groundbreaking: 1203
- Completed: 13th century
- Closed: 16th century
- Demolished: 1942

Cultural Good of Croatia
- Type: Protected cultural good
- Reference no.: Z-4372

The Church of Saint Bartholomew, also known as Knin Cathedral, was a 13th-century Catholic cathedral in Kapitul, near the city of Knin, Croatia. It was constructed on the site of an earlier Benedictine monastery, and became the seat of the diocese of Knin. It fell into disrepair in the 16th century, and was demolished during World War II by Italian troops.

== Background ==
In antiquity, a Roman bridge used to stand on the location of a modern railway bridge. Next to it, on the location of the later medieval capitol, was a Roman fort controlling the river passage.

== History ==
The foundation of the Diocese of Knin, according to Thomas the Archdeacon, can be traced back to the 11th century. The kings of Croatia, demanding to have their bishop, enthroned one in the Church of Saint Mary in modern-day Biskupija, Knin. The diocese was called the Croatian Diocese, and its bishop resided in the king's court and accompanied the royal entourage. The existing section of the church was then extended to fulfill the needs of the bishop, while the building was renovated during the rule of Zvonimir of Croatia, who also donated the estate of Kosovo to the diocese.

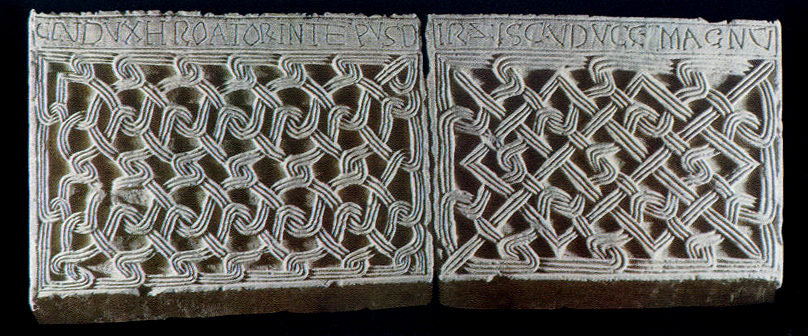
A 10th century Croatian interlace ornament from the Benedictine monastery of St. Bartholomew, containing the names of kings Stephen Držislav and Svetoslav Suronja.

Existing around the same time was a royal Benedictine monastery dedicated to Saint Bartholomew in Kapitul, whose abbots were also in the entourage of the Croatian rulers. Based on the archaeological findings from that location, the complex can be traced back to the 10th century, at the latest. Its excavated remains are conserved at the Museum of Croatian Archaeological Monuments in Split. These remains include tablets containing the names of two Croatian kings: Stjepan Držislav, and his successor Svetoslav Suronja, titled as dux Chroatorum on the inscription.

After the native kings of Croatia died out, the estate, along with the church, was donated by king Géza II of Hungary to the Diocese of Split, as claimed in one late 12th-century document.

In 1203, Dobroslav, provost of Knin, initiated the construction of a new cathedral on the site of the previous royal monastery. The church was dedicated to Saint Bartholomew in the 1380s, during the time of bishop Nicolas of Knin. The cathedral was described as "magnificent" upon its consecration. At the same time, Saint Bartholomew also became the patron of Knin's cathedral chapter, and his image appeared on the chapter's seal. The main apse of this new cathedral became a place of authentication (locus credibilis), and also most likely contained the chapter's archives. Along the main basilica was a church tower and the bishop's quarter with a backyard. The 16th century Francisian chronicler Ivan Tomašić in his Short Chronicle of Croatian Kingdom (lat. Chronicon breve Regni Croatiae) also claimed that the remains of Croatian king Demetrius Zvonimir were buried here, before the high altar.

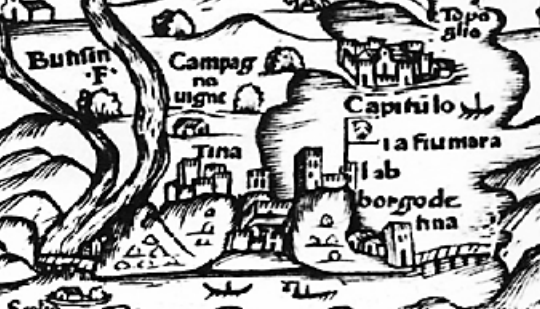
The Knin cathedral complex as it appeared on a 16th century Venetian map by Matteo Pagano.

Due to the threat of Ottoman invasions and the aftermath of the Battle of Krbava Field, the seat of the diocese was relocated to the town of Cazin. For the same reason, fortifications were erected around the cathedral complex by 1504. Somewhere in this time period, the diocese of Knin practically ceased to exist, remaining only as a titular see to the present day.

== Legacy ==
In 1885, Austria-Hungary built the Knin-Siverić railway line across the location of the old medieval monastery. Croatian archaeological pioneer Lujo Marun made an arrangement with construction workers to hand over "anything they find underground, that might seem interesting." The 10th century stone tablet containing the names of Svetoslav Suronja and Stephen Držislav were discovered around this time.

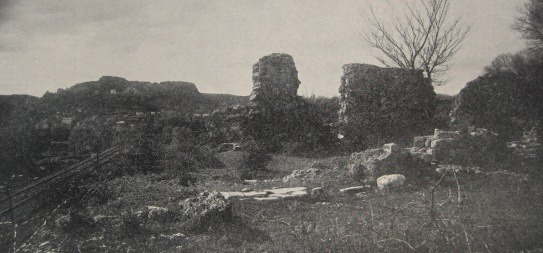
The cathedral remains in the 1920s, before its destruction by the Italians during World War II.

During World War II, Fascist Italian troops completely destroyed the cathedral's remnants to build a barracks. After the war, the site was settled by Romani people. After the Croatian War of Independence in the 1990s, the land became an illegal dumping site.

Although it was believed for 70 years that the cathedral was irretrievably lost, archaeologists from Split managed to recover its remains in September 2017. Thus far, only the cathedral's northern wall and its frontage have been researched.

== Architecture ==
It is theorized that Knin cathedral was a three-nave basilica similar to Trogir Cathedral. In 1927, Croatian architect Ćiril Iveković also drew a reconstruction of the building based on available data.

== See also ==
- Mausoleum of Croatian Kings
- Krbava Cathedral
- Hollow Church
