= Church of Saint Stephen at Otok =

Destroyed mausoleum in Solin, Croatia

Church of St. Stephen
- Crkva sv. Stjepana na Otoku
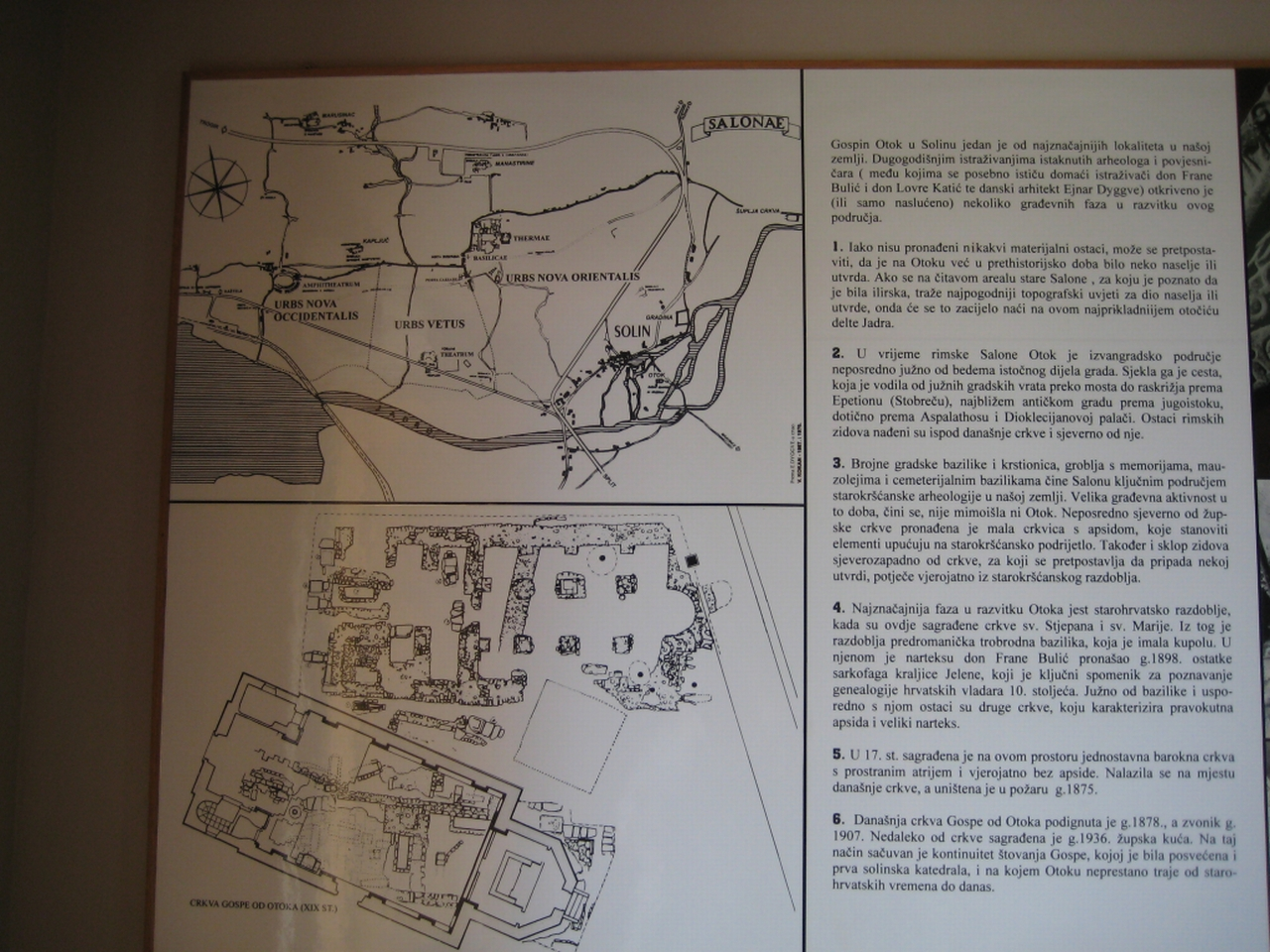
- Layout of excavated 10th century church of St. Stephen can be seen on bottom left corner of the image

General information
- Type: pre-Romanesque three nave basilica
- Location: Solin, Croatia
- Coordinates: 43.53524°N 16.49056°E
- Completed: 10th century
- Destroyed: presumably early 16th century
- Landlord: Catholic Church

Design and construction
- Main contractor: Helen of Zadar

Church of Saint Stephen was a 10th-century church in Salona, currently an archaeological site located in today's Solin, Croatia. Its atrium served as a mausoleum of Croatian medieval rulers. It is one of the two medieval churches on the site, the other being dedicated to the Virgin Mary.

The Church is named after 'Otok' as the site is called Gospin otok, lit. 'Our Lady's Island', a river island on the Jadro.

== History ==
According to writings of 13th century medieval chronicler, Thomas the Archdeacon, the Church of St. Stephen was built by queen Helen of Zadar, who then donated them to the diocese of Split. Thomas claims, that the churches were temporarily given to some monks who performed rituals there, due to the royal tombs being inside, until king Zvonimir of Croatia donated them back to the diocese of Split. Thomas noted on:

"For there the magnificent man King Cresimir was buried, in the courtyard of the Basilica of Saint Stephen, with many other kings and queens".

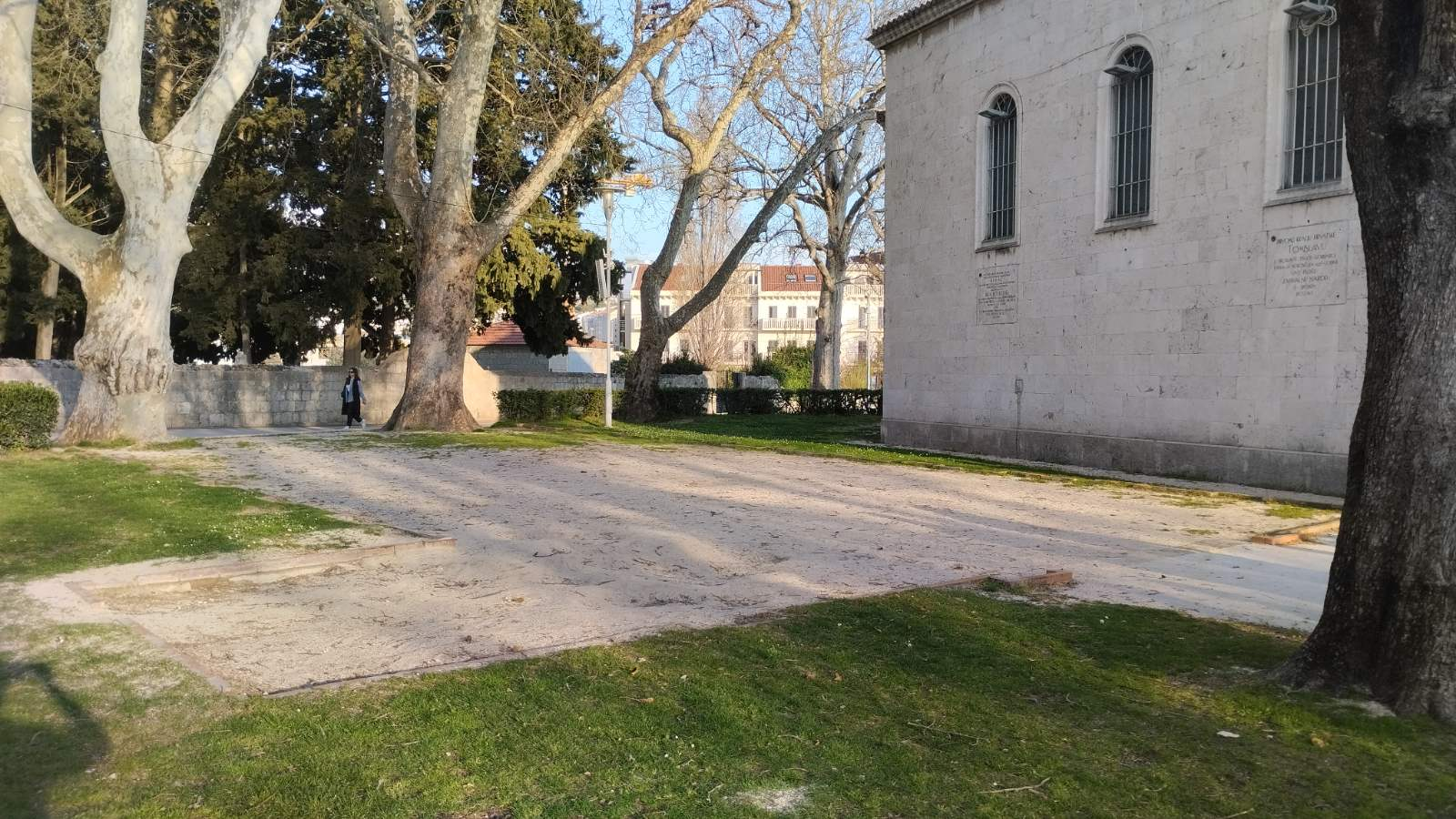
The marked sandy surface next to the modern-day church shows the actual place (the layout) where Church of Saint Stephen used to stand during its existence.

Although this area was affected by the Mongol invasions of 13th century, who chased Hungarian king Bela IV all the way to Dalmatia and besieged the nearby Klis fortress, most Croatian scholars nowadays agree that the church of St. Stephen survived these invasions, since it is still visible on 14th century maps. They presume, however, that it was destroyed somewhere in early 16th century, during the Ottoman invasions.

=== Archeological excavations ===
During the construction of a new bell tower in the late 19th century, construction engineers recognised the remains of some old church walls and invited archeologists to conduct the archeological research of these remains. The research led by Frane Bulić was conducted during the summer of 1898 and as a result of it, fragmented and burnt remains of an epitaph were found. After more than 90 fragments were recovered, Bulić and his team had them reconstructed and got the following inscription:

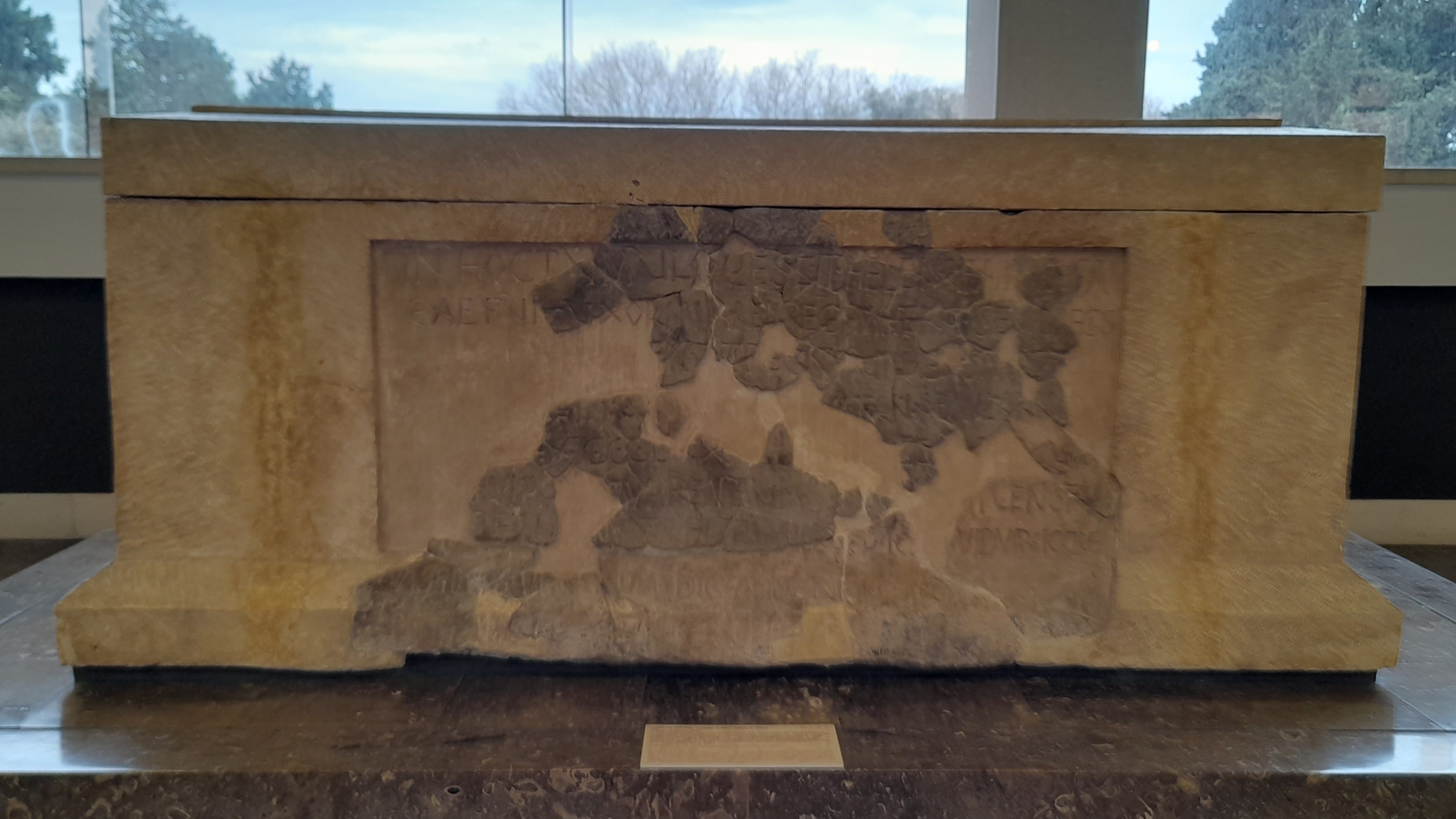
Remains of 10th century Queen Helen's epitaph discovered here.

In this tomb rests queen Helen, servant of God, wife of king Michael, mother of king Stephen [...] On the eight day, month of October, she was buried here, 976th year after ascention of Lord [...] She, who was during her life a mother of Kingdom, became (the mother) of poor and protector of widows. By looking here, say thou man: God, give mercy to her soul!"

== See also ==
- Hollow Church
- Crkvina, Biskupija
- Cathedral of Saint Bartholomew in Kapitul
