= Crkvina, Biskupija =

Former medieval church and archaeological site in Biskupija, Croatia

Crkvina
- Interactive map of Crkvina
- Coordinates: 43.9931°N 16.2271°E

Crkvina, also known as Basilica of Saint Mary, is a former church and archaeological site in Biskupija, Croatia. The basilica is believed to have been a medieval cathedral, with pre-Romanesque characteristics.

== Description ==
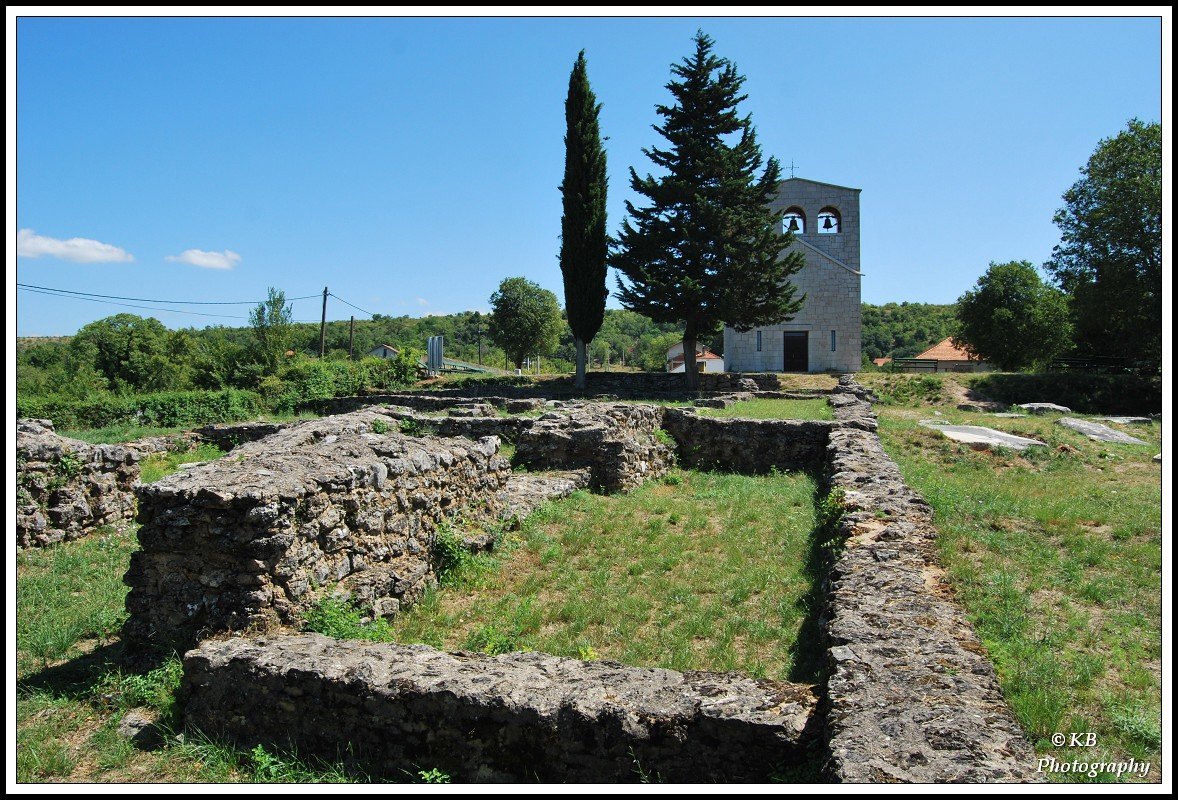
Site of the remains of the building complex

The central basilica, dedicated to Mary, mother of Jesus, was three-naved, with the southwestern section being used as a mausoleum for rulers since at least the early 9th century. A 9th century sarcophagus adorned with two hippocampus was discovered, it was constructed using stones from ancient Roman architecture. Without the central apse and the mausoleum, the building measures 21,25 metres in length and 12,5 metres in width. It is rectangular in shape, with the central nave being wider than the other two, which are divided by four pillars measuring between 1 and 1,5 metres. Research suggests that the sanctuary was covered with marble slabs. Stronger foundations of the mausoleum suggest that the ceiling there was vaulted. Only the foundations of the church are preserved.

The interior furnishings of the church were established to have been altered or replaced by four different stonemasonry workshops throughout history. The phases of the construction and alteration can be divided in six distinct periods:

- c. 820–823, when the initial three naved church without narthex was built, six-sided larger ciborium, the aforementioned sarcophagus, the first altar railing
- c. 879–892, workshop dating from the time of Duke Branimir, when the second altar rail was made
- early 10th century, when a new altar rail and the ambon with rosettas were made
- Knin-Zadar workshop, which was active in the mid-11th century, participated in the restoration of stone latticework
- Romanesque workshop from Knin, during the time of king Demetrius Zvonimir. Created the smaller, four-sided ciborium, parts of an altar railing, including the notable depiction of Theotokos, gable and other architectural decoration
- 12th century workshops, which made smaller changes and repairs

The most notable among the retrieved artifacts is the earliest depiction of Theotokos (God-bearer) and one of the oldest icons in Croatia, with the inscription SAL VE (RE) G (INA) S (AL VE) V (I) R GO. The stone icon was originally painted in colors.

The basilica is adjoined by a residential complex to the north consisting of a central courtyard and surrounded by dwellings of at least fifteen rooms. These individual rooms contain furnaces, where animal bone and ceramic fragments were found during excavations. A larger number or mortars and gindstones were found as well.

== History ==
The area in which the church is situated was historically called villa regalis (royal village) and Kosovo. The Chronicle of the Priest of Duklja, when relaying the legend of the murder of king Demetrius Zvonimir, calls the area 'five churches of Kosovo' (pet crikvah u Kosovah). Archaeologists have confirmed the existence of five Early Medieval churches, situated in the countryside near Knin, with the Church of Saint Mary being one of them.

The building traces its history to the early 9th century, when the initial three-nave basilica was built. It was subsequently expanded and renovated multiple times throughout centuries. In the middle of the 11th-century, the basilica became the seat of the Bishop of the Croats. As chronicler Thomas the Archdeacon writes in his Historia Salonitana:

[...] Moreover, the kings of the Croats wanted to have, as it were, a special bishop, for which they petitioned the archbishop of Split. They created a bishop who was known as the bishop of Croatia, and they placed his see in the country-side, in the church of Saint Mary near the castle of Knin. He held many parishes and had estates and possessions throughout nearly the whole kingdom of Croatia, because he was the royal bishop and attended the king's court. [...]

The church was first reconstructed and refurnished, and then reconsecrated by king Demetrius Zvonimir sometime between 1076 and 1078, when the bishop was Peter.

In the latter half of the 12th century, in accordance with the ecclesiastical conclusions at the synod in Split (1185), the bishop changed his see to the nearby Knin, and became the Bishop of Knin. These bishops continued to call themselves Croatian bishops on occasion. The building complex was still in use until the 13th century, when a new church was erected in the old basilica's central nave, and graves were dug in its immediate surrounding until the 15th century.

There has been a lot of scholarly debate about the exact status and whether and when this church was the cathedral of the so-called Bishop of the Croats (Episcopus Chroatensis), and/or the Bishop of Knin). Jurčević (2016) says the prevailing opinion in the scholarship is that this church was the seat of the Bishop of the Croats, while the seat of the Bishop of Knin was the Cathedral of Saint Bartholomew in Kapitul, but that the discussion on this has not been concluded.

== Legacy ==
In 1746, Croatian historian Gašpar Vinjalić reported on the historical sites in the Biskupija area.

According to Daniele Farlati's Illyricum sacrum (1769), a college of canons was established at the behest of king Peter Krešimir IV (1059–1074), who also built dwellings to house both them and the bishop next to the basilica.

In 1886, the first formal excavations started, led by Lujo Marun, who would come back to the site a total of twenty times up to 1908. In 1888, Frane Bulić published the first scientific review of Marun's progress. In turn, Frano Radić spent a number of years analyzing the same artifacts. Historians Ferdo Šišić and Ljubo Karaman likewise contributed to the scientific debate about Crkvina. In the 1930s, historian and archeologist Stjepan Gunjača published a number of works about the Crkvina artifacts kept in the Muzej hrvatskih starina (Museum of Croatian Antiquities). He conducted further excavations in the area in 1950, 1951 and 1957, which started a new round of scientific critique. Afterwards, it was thought the location was completely explored, until an accidental new find in 1983 by Milojko Budimir brought that into doubt. A follow-up excavation in 2000 was led by Ljubomir Gudelj Velaga. As a result, archeologist Ante Milošević published a new site map based on this, and Ivan Mirnik also published some older information from earlier excavations. Later, between 2008 and 2015, the Museum of Croatian Archaeological Monuments conducted follow-up excavations, led by Maja Petrinec and Ante Jurčević.

== See also ==
- Croatian pre-Romanesque art and architecture

== Sources ==
- Jurčević, Ante (2016). Arhitektura i skulptura s lokaliteta Crkvina u Biskupiji kod Knina [Architecture and sculpture from the site Crkvina in Biskupija near Knin] (PDF) (Doctoral thesis) (in Croatian). University of Zagreb Faculty of Philosophy.
