= Helen of Croatia =

Helen of Croatia may refer to two queens consort of Croatia:

- Helen of Zadar (died 976), wife of King Michael Krešimir II
- Helen of Hungary, Queen of Croatia (died 1091), wife of King Demetrius Zvonimir
