= Lujo =

Lujo may refer to:

- Lujo virus, an RNA virus known to cause of viral hemorrhagic fever
- Lujo (given name), a South Slavic masculine given name
- Lujo Records, American record label founded in 2001
