= Biskupija =

Biskupija Бискупија (Serbian)
- Municipality
- Općina Biskupija; Општина Бискупија; Municipality of Biskupija
- Interactive map of Biskupija
- Location within Croatia
- Coordinates: 44°0′N 16°14′E
- Country: Croatia
- Region: Dalmatia (Dalmatian Hinterland)
- County: Šibenik-Knin County

Government
  - Mayor: Milan Đurđević (SDSS)

Area
  - Total: 133.4 km^{2} (51.5 sq mi)

Population (2021)
  - Total: 1,177
  - Density: 8.823/km^{2} (22.85/sq mi)
- Time zone: UTC+1 (CET)
  - Summer (DST): UTC+2 (CEST)
- Postal code: 22300 Knin
- Website: biskupija.hr

Biskupija (Serbian Cyrillic: Бискупија) is a village and municipality in Šibenik-Knin County, Croatia. The seat of the municipality is the village of Orlić.

== Etymology ==
The word Biskupija in Croatian means diocese, referring to the former estate and seat of Croatian bishops in this area. The place was also known as Kosovo from 11th til 18th century, after the Kosovo field. Kosovo is still used as name for the train station located in the municipality.

== Geography ==
The municipality covers a karst field called Kosovo field, located between the mountains of Promina and Veliki Kozjak. The village of Biskupija itself is located in the north of the municipality, just south of Knin.

The D33 and D1 state roads and the Zagreb-Split railway pass through the municipality.

== Languages ==
Along with Croatian, which is the official language in the whole country, Serbian language and Serbian Cyrillic alphabet are co-official on the territory of the municipality.

As of 2023, most of the legal requirements for the fulfillment of bilingual standards have not been carried out. Official buildings do have Cyrillic signage, but not street signs or seals. Cyrillic is not used on any official documents, nor are there public legal and administrative employees proficient in the script.

== History and culture ==
The shrine of Our Lady of Biskupija, or St. Mary of Croatia, is situated in the village of Biskupija, 5 km southeast of Knin, the former church and cultural centre of the Croatian state in the Middle Ages. Nearby, the forgotten hamlet of Stari Popovići, with its well-preserved stone houses and unique architecture, stands as a testament to the region’s rich history and rural heritage. Archaeologists have discovered the foundations of five churches in that village, dating from the period of Croatian rulers from the 9th to the 11th century. St. Mary's church was the residence of the Bishop of Knin, who was Bishop of Croatia from 1040 to 1522. The earliest known figure of Our Lady in Croatian art was discovered by archaeologists in that same church on a part of the stone partition wall, which separated the shrine from the church nave. It is still venerated as Our Lady of the Great Croatian Vow.

Today, on the foundations of the old Croatian church of the same name there stands a memorial church, decorated between 1937 and 1938 according to the designs of Croatia’s most famous sculptor, Ivan Meštrović. The church is a single-nave building (16 x 8.4 m) with a square niche for the altar, and a 12.5-metre-tall (41 ft) steeple before it. Ivan Meštrović also created the statue of Our Lady, depicting a Mother wearing a folk costume from Dalmatian Hinterland, with a child on her lap, and who is writing the book of life. Regrettably, however, the statue was destroyed by Serbian rebels. Above the niche containing the main altar the renowned Croatian artist, Jozo Kljaković, painted the fresco "King Zvonimir holding Court", which was also riddled by bullets fired by Serbian extremists. The church was thoroughly refurbished in 1966, when Meštrović's statue was restored. Since then, the main pilgrimage occurs on the last Sunday in September, when the Holy Virgin’s name is honoured. The church was once again destroyed during the Croatian War of Independence, and now awaits rebuilding.

In April 1943, Đujić's Chetniks set up a prison and execution site in the village of Kosovo (today Biskupija). Thousands of local civilians, (both Croats and even Serb Anti-Fascists) including women and children, as well as captured Partisans, were held and mistreated at this prison, while hundreds of prisoners (as many as over 1,000) were tortured and killed at an execution site near a ravine close to the camp.

In August 1995, fifteen elderly Serbian civilians were massacred by Croatian forces in the aftermath of Operation Storm.

== Demographics ==
As per 2011 census, there were a total of 1,699 inhabitants in the municipality: 1,452 Serbs, 231 Croats and 16 others. By mother tongue, there were 589 Croatian speakers, 417 Serbian speakers, 687 Serbo-Croatian speakers and 6 speakers of other languages combined.

In 2021, the municipality had 1,177 residents in the following 8 settlements:

- Biskupija, population 266
- Markovac, population 44
- Orlić, population 187
- Ramljane, population 117
- Riđane, population 51
- Uzdolje, population 162
- Vrbnik, population 297
- Zvjerinac, population 53
Biskupija: Population trends 1857–2021
v

population	4994	5082	4387	5285	5586	6027	5757	7279	6698	7102	7155	6503	5682	5417	1669	1699	1177
	1857	1869	1880	1890	1900	1910	1921	1931	1948	1953	1961	1971	1981	1991	2001	2011	2021

Sources: Croatian Bureau of Statistics publications

== See also ==
- Knin
