= Promina =

Promina may refer to:

- Promina (mountain), in Dalmatia, southern Croatia
- Promina, Croatia, municipality in Šibenik-Knin County of Croatia
- Promina Group, Australian insurance company acquired by Suncorp in 2007
- Promina, a line of multiplexers formerly sold by Network Equipment Technologies.
