= Nečven =

Croatian medieval fortress

Coordinates: 43.9771°N 16.0307°E

- Interactive map of Nečven

Fort Nečven or Nečven City (also Nečvem or Nechwen as it was in 1487 AD) is a medieval Croatian fortress from the 14th century, and one of the most important fortified buildings in Croatia in terms of size and degree of preservation. It is on the west side of Promina mountain, on the edge of the high cliffs of river Krka, 3 kilometres (2 mi) south of Miljacka Falls, where the Krka National Park begins, by the eponymous village.

Nečven originates, according to the 19th-century historian Grgur Urlić-Ivanović who first described the remains, in the 9th century, and was named, according to legend, after a beautiful girl from the area that rejected all violence from the Bribirers and eventually poisoned herself to avoid capture. The story probably symbolizes the hostility between the Šubić's Trošenj-Čučevo and Nelipić's Nečven.

The fort and its associated yard cover a square kilometer (0.4 sq mi). It used to be surrounded by high walls made of small, poorly assembled stones combined with lime. The northeast courtyard wall was separated by a deep moat and perhaps a moving (lifting) bridge from the remains of the fortress. The walls were over a meter thick. The steep southern walls reached a height of up to 15 metres (49 ft) and consisted of five floors. The northern side, where the five-storey ancient square tower stands, is now filled with rubble.

On the other side of Krka, opposite from Nečven, are remnants of another old Croatian city, Trošenj (Čučevo). Those cities were previously connected by a bridge (which was destroyed in 1647 during the war between Don Stjepan Sorić and Krajišnici) that connected central Dalmatia with Bukovica and Ravni Kotari. The bridge was supervised and travellers who passed the border between Šubić's and Nelipić's properties were charged a toll.

The First Lords of Nečven-Nelipić were at the height of their power after the collapse of Mladen Šubić II (1322 AD) when they were named as the major force in the Southern Croatian region by Prince Nelipac.

The Turks ruled Nečven from 1522 to 1678 or 1686, apart from a period between 1648 and 1670 during which it was given to Venetian vassals Šibenik and Trogir, and burned down at the orders of Leonardo Foscolo, using the established constructions they found and the mighty wooden bridge over the river Krka. In their time there lived: the Dizdars, the Aghas, the Begs and the Kadijas), which showed a great deal how important the fort and the city was because it was in effect the seat for administrative and judicial power in that area for that time.

By the end of the 18th century, the fortress lost its strategic importance, and it was abandoned and the surrounding villages depopulated.
