= Ante Jurić (bishop) =

Croatian Prelate of the Catholic Church

- Archbishop Emeritus of the Archdiocese of Split-Makarska
- Church: Catholic Church
- See: Archdiocese of Split-Makarska
- In office: 1988–2000
- Predecessor: Frane Franić
- Successor: Marin Barišic
- Previous post(s): Prelate

Orders
- Ordination: 18 May 1947
- Consecration: 16 October 1988 by Frane Franić

Personal details
- Born: 17 May 1922; Vranjic, Kingdom of Yugoslavia
- Died: 20 March 2022 (aged 99); Pula, Croatia

Ante Jurić (17 May 1922 – 20 March 2022) was a Croatian Prelate of the Catholic Church.

Ante Jurić was born in Vranjic, now Croatia, and was ordained a priest on 18 May 1947. He was appointed the Archbishop of Split-Makarska on 10 September 1988, and consecrated on 16 October 1988. Jurić retired on 21 June 2000.

== See also ==
- Archdiocese of Split-Makarska
