= Krka National Park =

- Park
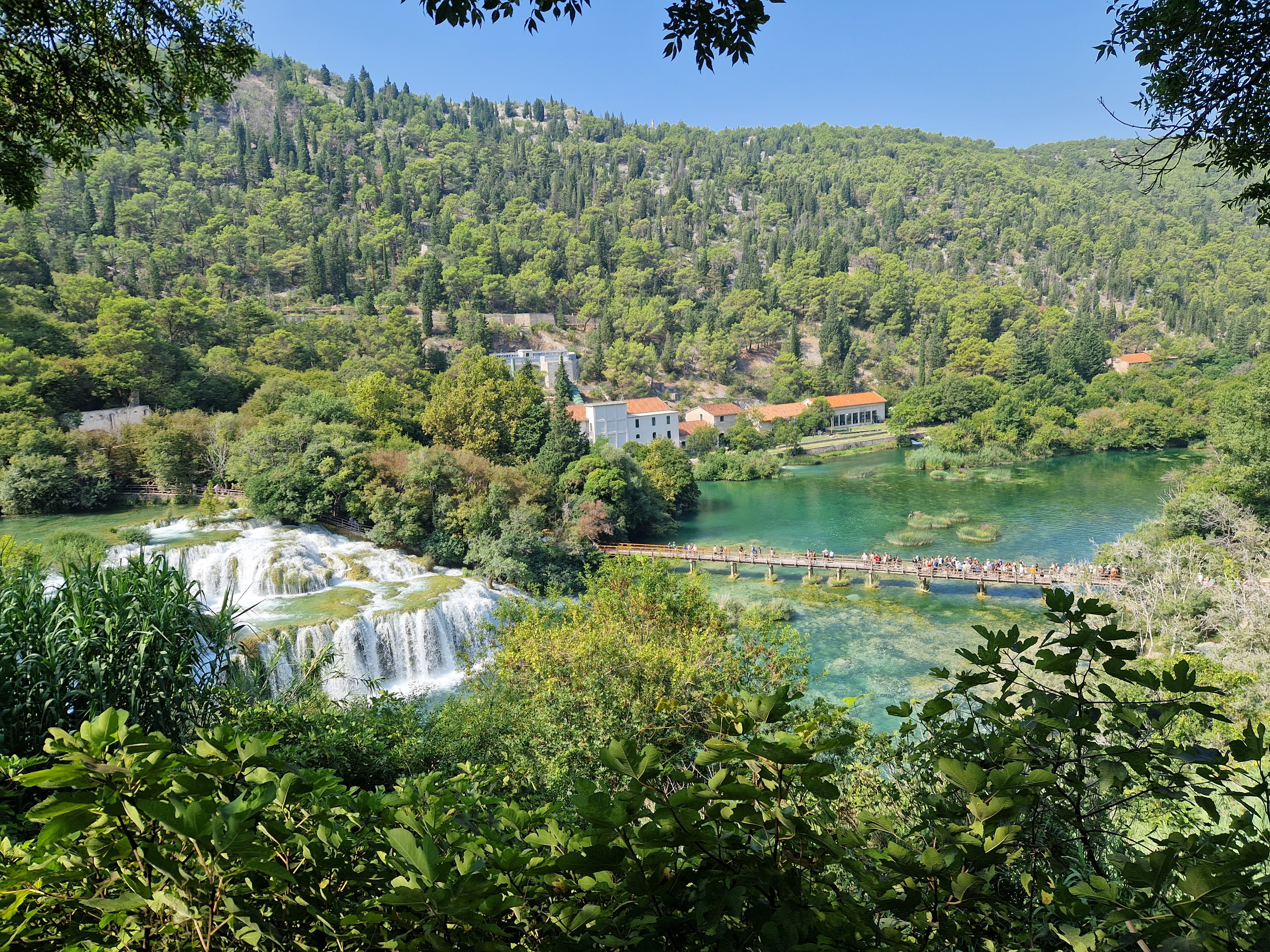
- Interactive map of Krka National Park
- Location of Krka N.P. within Croatia
- Coordinates: 43°48′07″N 15°58′22″E
- Country: Croatia
- County: Šibenik-Knin County
- Established: 1985
- Time zone: UTC+1 (CET)
  - Summer (DST): UTC+2 (CEST)
- Website: Krka national park

Krka National Park (Croatian: Nacionalni park Krka) is one of the Croatian national parks, named after the river Krka (ancient Greek: Kyrikos) that it encloses. It is located along the middle-lower course of the Krka River in central Dalmatia, in Šibenik-Knin county, downstream Miljevci area, and just a few kilometers northeast of the city of Šibenik. It was formed to protect the Krka River and is intended primarily for scientific, cultural, educational, recreational, and tourism activities. It is the seventh national park in Croatia and was proclaimed a national park in 1985.

== Geography ==
The Krka National Park is located entirely within the territory of Šibenik-Knin County and encompasses an area of 109 square kilometers along the Krka River: two kilometers downriver from Knin to Skradin and the lower part of the river Čikola. The Krka National Park is a spacious, largely unchanged region of exceptional and multifaceted natural value, and includes one or more preserved or insignificantly altered ecosystems. The Krka Waterfalls area has the second highest density of lavender in Europe, hence the high frequency of wasps and bees in the area.

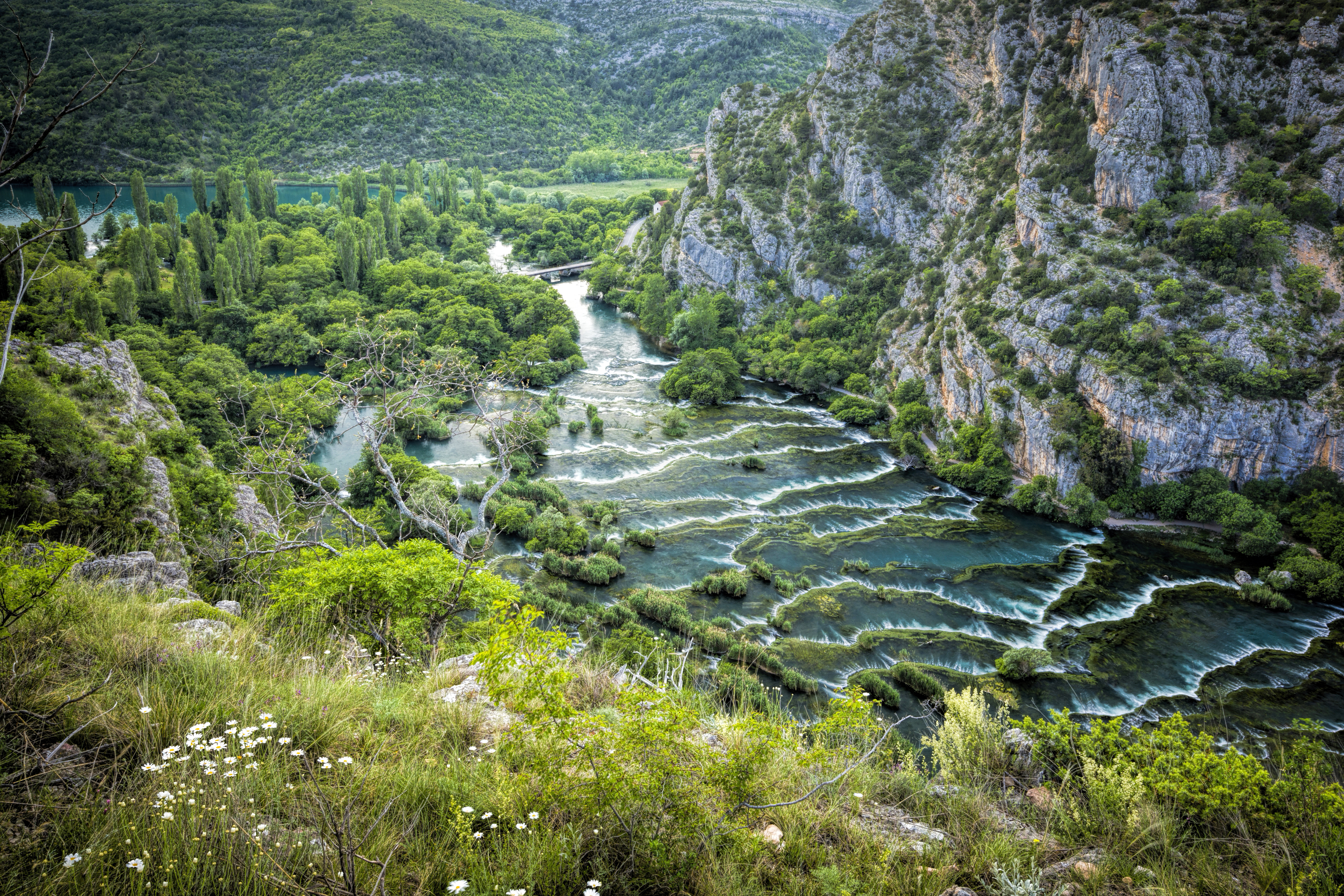
The Ogrlice cascades within the park

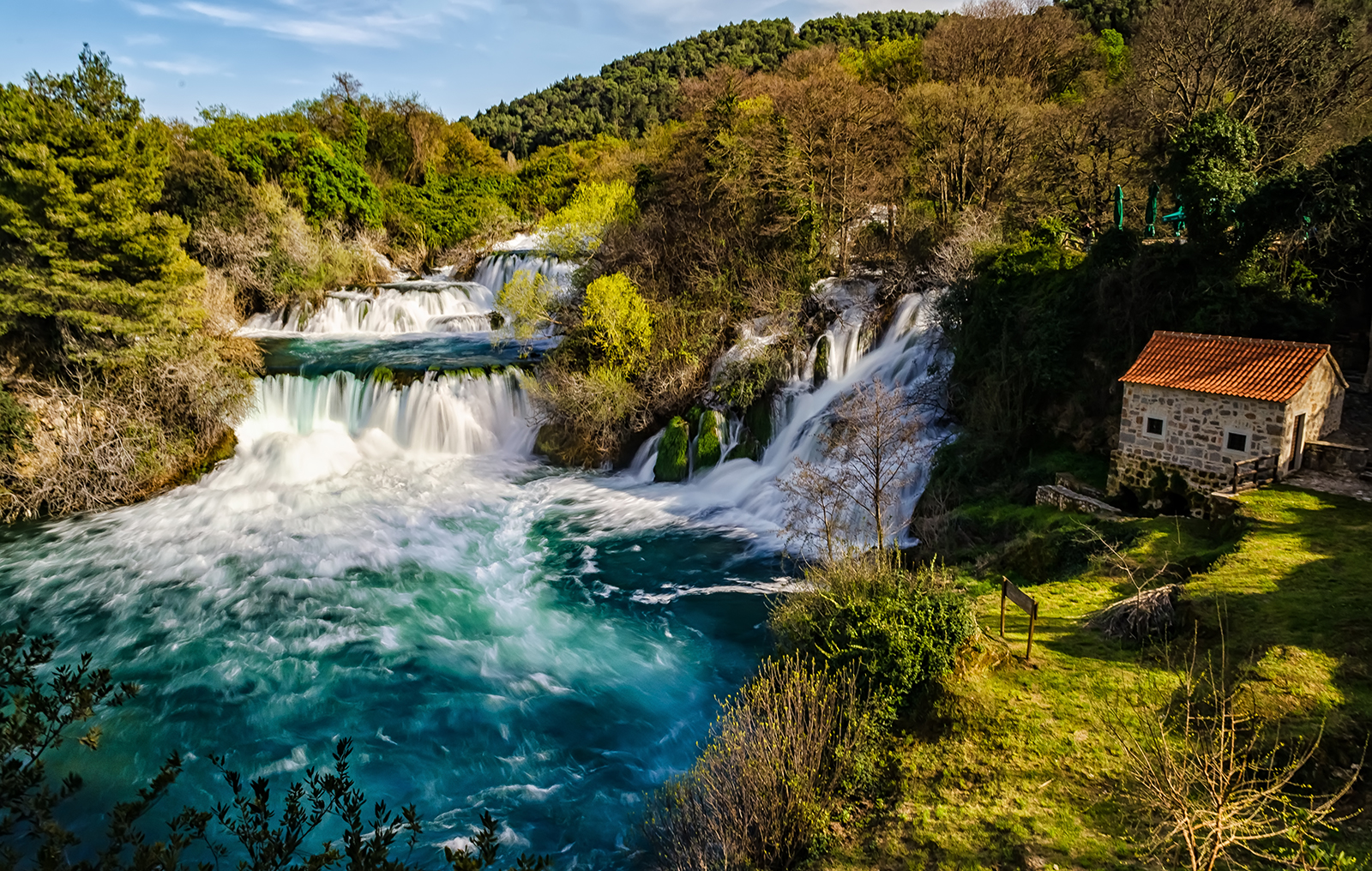
Krka National Park

== Environment ==
=== Flora ===
The Krka National Park belongs to the Southern European (Mediterranean and sub-Mediterranean) region. Due to its special position and the mosaic distribution of various types of habitats, it is characterized by exceptionally rich and varied flora and fauna.

860 species and subspecies of plants have been identified within the territory of the Krka National Park, including several endemic Illyrian-Adriatic species. Standing out are the stone bellflower, the chimney bellflower, the mullein inula, Dalmatian pellitory and the Illirian iris, which is found growing on the rocks. Other endemic plants growing in this hot and dry environment include the wolfen spurge, Adriatic violet, musk thistle, thorny centaurium, strawberry spurge and Bertolon's sage. In the wet areas along the Krka and Čikola rivers and in the Krka river valley grow meadow squill, knotweed, European hornbeam, wood melick and lady orchid.

=== Fauna ===
Eighteen species of fish inhabit the Krka River, among which ten are endemic, making the Krka a natural landmark of the highest category. Brown trout and Dalmatian barbelgudgeon are a couple of fish that can be found in the ecosystem.

Patches of reeds, lakes formed along part of the river and swamped meadows abound in amphibians and birds, while thickets and stone quarries are home to reptiles.

The abundance of species of birds (222), the structure of the bird communities and the great significance of the Krka for spring and autumn migrations make it among the ornithologically most valuable regions of Europe. There are numerous birds of prey in the area, notable ones are: osprey, short-toed eagle, golden eagle, Bonelli's eagle, lanner falcon and the peregrine falcon. Other birds of interest are Eurasian eagle-owl, European bee-eater and griffon vulture.

Among mammals, there are 18 species of bats, which are generally endangered or near extinction in the rest of Europe, long-fingered bat, the Daubenton's bat, and the threatened European otter.

=== Ria ===
A ria is the mouth of a river that flows into the sea, created by the submergence of the riverbed after the rise of the Adriatic Sea level for 135 metres after the last quaternary glaciation. In the ria of the Krka River, seawater extends to the base of Skradinski buk. The ria of the Krka River is 23.5 kilometers in length.

This ria is considered an exceptional phenomenon, due to its lack of pollution and biological vitality. It is an area rich in shellfish, freshwater fish and saltwater fish.

== Tourism ==
Krka National Park waterfall

Krka National Park features several places of interest for visitors. The attractions and facilities available include various boardwalks, sightseeing tours and presentations, boat trips, souvenir shops, a museum, and restaurants. There are also several archeological remains of unpreserved fortresses in the park's vicinity dating back to Roman times. They are Čučevo, Nečven, Bogočin, Ključica, and Burnum.

=== Skradinski buk ===
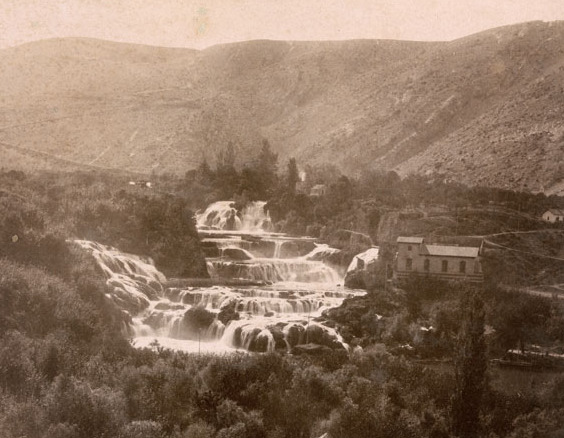
Skradinski buk and the old Jaruga Hydroelectric Power Plant in ca. 1898

Skradinski buk is one of the most attractive parts of the park. It is a massive, clear, natural pool with high waterfalls at one end and cascades at the other. It is the lowest of the three sets of waterfalls formed along the Krka river. In an area 400 m in length and 100 m in width there are 17 waterfalls and the total difference in height between the first and the last falls is 47.7 m. Due to the wealth and variety of geomorphological forms, vegetation, and the various effects caused by the play of light on the whirlpools, Skradinski buk is considered to be one of the most beautiful calcium carbonate waterfalls in Europe.

The rate of flow is 43 m^{3} a second in winter, 18 m^{3} in summer, with an average of 55 cubic metres a second flowing down Skradinski buk annually. It is the largest travertine cascade system in Europe.

=== Roški Slap ===
Hiking trail on Roški slap

Roški Slap, located near Miljevci, is the second most popular attraction of the Krka National Park in terms of numbers of visitors. It is the sixth waterfall of the river Krka. Around the whole location there is a walking trail with wonderful views. There is also a hiking trail. The location can be visited throughout the year. The easiest way to reach Roški Slap is to take one of the excursion boats operated by the Krka National Park, although the falls can also be reached with a public road.

=== Monastery ===
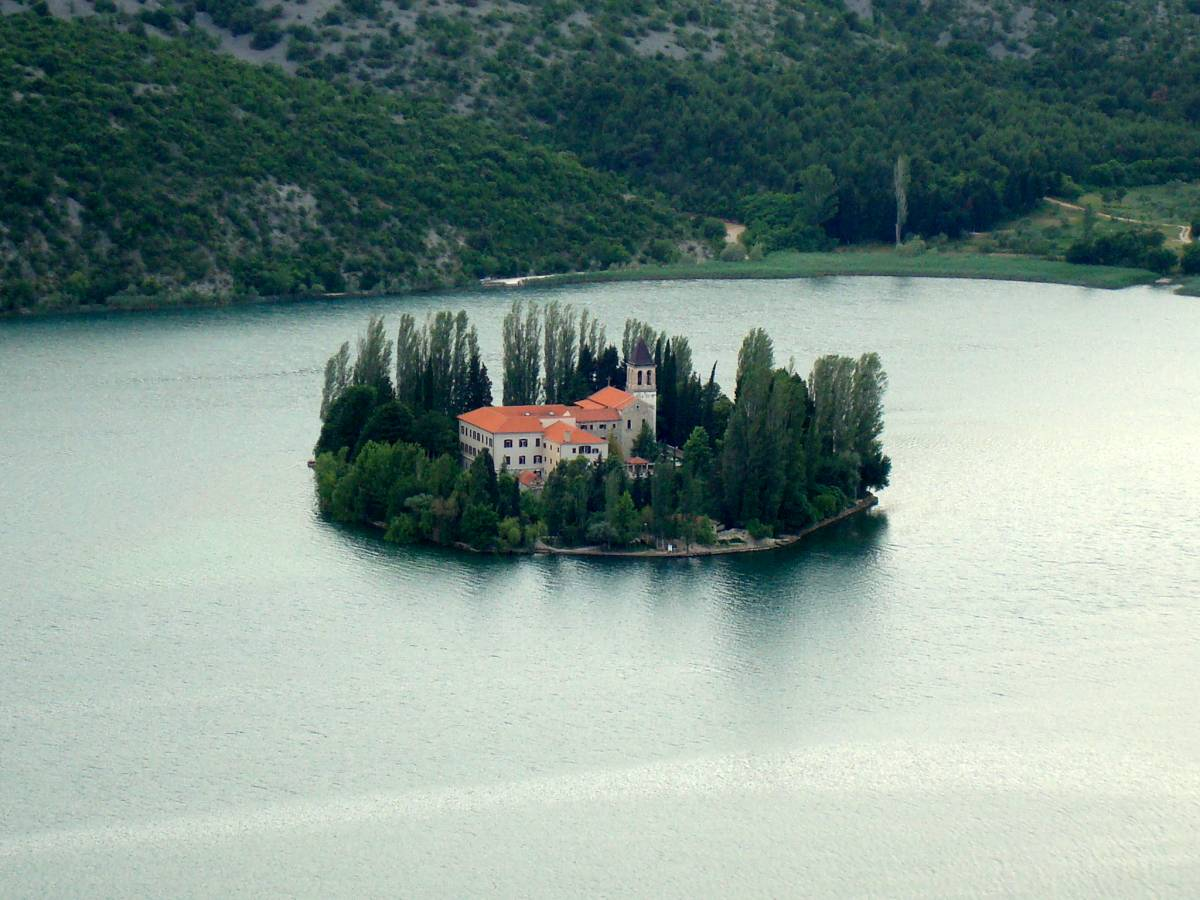
Visovac Monastery on Visovac Island

Inside the park is the island of Visovac which was founded during the reign of Louis I of Hungary (XIV century), home to the Roman Catholic Visovac Monastery founded by the Franciscans in 1445 near Miljevci village. The island can be visited by a boat tour from Skradinski buk. The park also includes the Serbian Eastern Orthodox Monastery Krka founded in 1345. The Krka monastery is a spiritual center of the Orthodox Dalmatian Eparchy (Diocese), and was first mentioned in written documents in the year 1402 as the pious endowment of Jelena Šubić, the sister of Serbian Emperor Dušan. The monastery was built and rebuilt until the late 18th century.

== See also ==
- Jaruga Hydroelectric Power Plant
- List of waterfalls
- List of protected areas of Croatia
