= Kosovo polje (Croatia) =

Karst field in Croatia

- Location within Croatia
- Floor elevation: 300–350 m (980–1,150 ft)
- Area: 33 km^{2} (13 mi^{2})

Geography
- Country: Croatia
- County: Šibenik-Knin County
- Population center: Biskupija, Knin
- Coordinates: 44°N 16.22°E
- Mountain range: Dinaric Alps
- Rivers: Kosovčica

Location
- Interactive map of Kosovo polje

Kosovo polje (Serbian Cyrillic: Косово поље) is a karst polje located south of Knin, Croatia, in the northern basin of the Krka river. It was named after the Krka tributary Kosovčica that runs through in it. The area also includes a number of lakes, the Šarena and Burumska lakes, and the Bračića lake. It is located between the mountains of Promina to the west and Veliki Kozjak to the east.

== Sources ==
- Petrinec, Maja (2018). "Archaeological research into and arrangement of the architectural complex at Crkvina in Biskupija in the period from 2008 to 2017". Starohrvatska prosvjeta. III (44–45) – via Hrčak.
- Kulušić, Anita; Borojević Šoštarić, Sibila (2014). "Dinaride evaporite mélange: Diagenesis of the Kosovo polje evaporites". Geologia Croatica. 67 (1).
