= Lujo (given name) =

Lujo is a masculine given name. Notable people with the name include:

- Lujo Adamović (1864–1935), Serbian botanist
- Lujo Bakotić (1867–1941), Serbian writer and diplomat
- Lujo Bezeredi (1898–1979), Croatian artist
- Lujo Brentano (1844–1931), German economist
- Lujo Györy (1930–2012), Croatian handball player
- Lujo Margetić (1920–2010), Croatian legal historian
- Lujo Marun (1857–1939), Croatian priest and archaeologist
- Lujo Tončić-Sorinj (1915–2005), Austrian diplomat and Croatian noble
- Lujo Vojnović (1864–1951), Serbian politician and diplomat
