= Markovac, Šibenik-Knin County =

Markovac
- Village
- Interactive map of Markovac
- Coordinates: 43.9581°N 16.2594°E
- Country: Croatia
- County: Šibenik-Knin County
- Municipality: Biskupija

Area
  - Total: 9.9 km^{2} (3.8 sq mi)

Population (2021)
  - Total: 44
  - Density: 4.4/km^{2} (12/sq mi)
- Time zone: UTC+1 (CET)
  - Summer (DST): UTC+2 (CEST)
- Postal code: 22300 Knin
- Area code: + 385 (0)22

Markovac is a village in the Biskupija municipality.

== Demographics ==
Village of Markovac: Population trends 1857–2021
v

population	216		170	245	210	235		284	305	276	307	293	209	242	77	63	44
	1857	1869	1880	1890	1900	1910	1921	1931	1948	1953	1961	1971	1981	1991	2001	2011	2021

Note:Under Polača in 1869 and 1921. Designated a dio naselja until 1890. Sources: Croatian Bureau of Statistics publications
