= Vranjic =

- Village
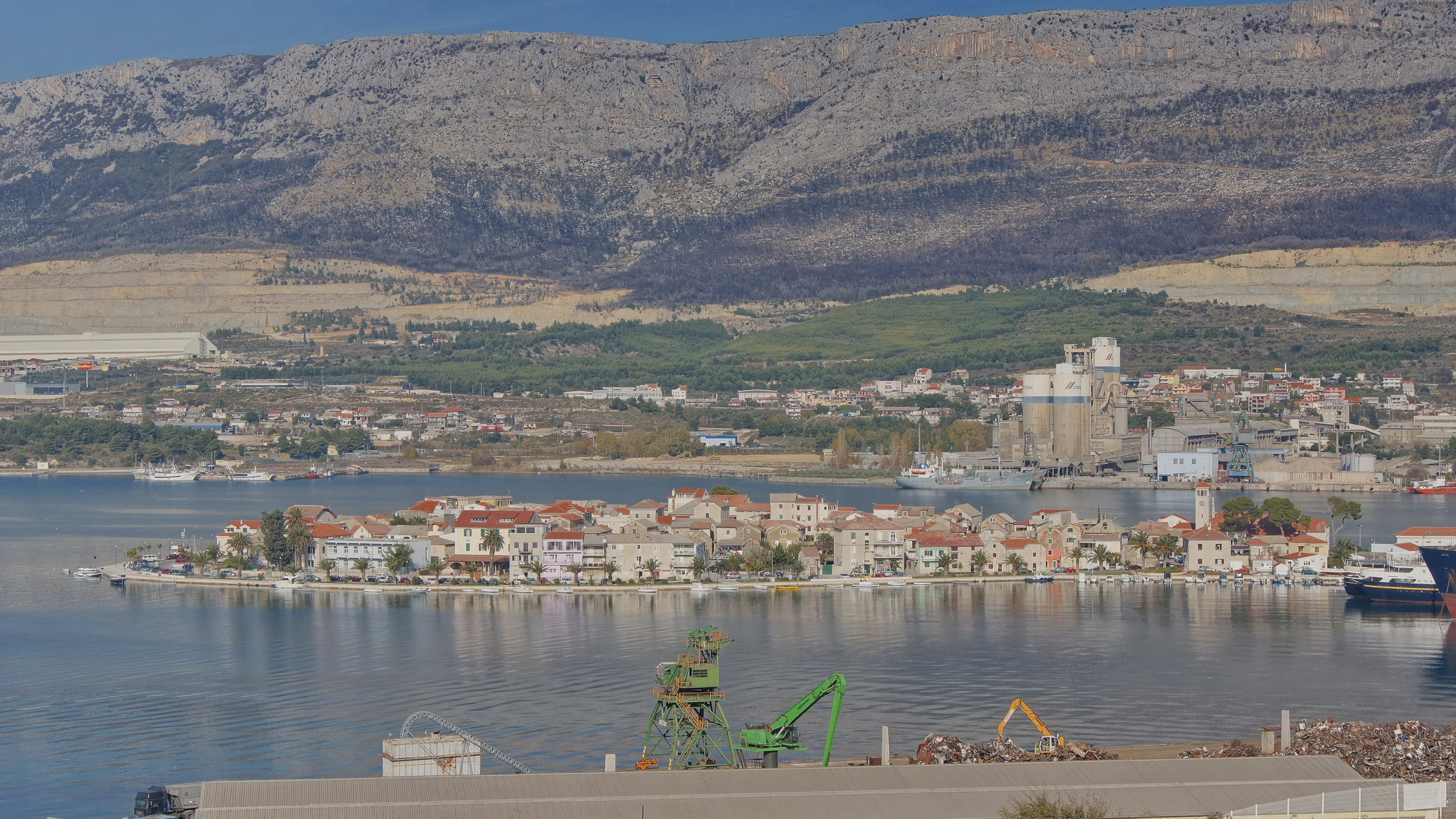
- View of Vranjic with Kaštel Sućurac in the background

- Location of Vranjic in Croatia
- Country: Croatia
- County: Split-Dalmatia County
- Town: Solin

Area
  - Total: 0.8 km^{2} (0.31 sq mi)

Population (2021)
  - Total: 1,064
  - Density: 1,300/km^{2} (3,400/sq mi)
- Time zone: UTC+1 (CET)
  - Summer (DST): UTC+2 (CEST)
- Postal code: 21211 Vranjic

Vranjic (Croatian pronunciation: [ʋrâɲit͡s]) is a village north of Split, near the mouth of Jadro River, administratively located in the Town of Solin. Because of its beauty it was nicknamed "Little Venice". The church of Saint Martin, the pope, is a place of cultural heritage, with sacred folk music performers Crkveni pjevači župe sv. Martina - Vranjic.

Vranjic is the birthplace of one of the greatest archaeologists for early Christianity – Don Frane Bulić. Klapa Hurania (Latin name for Vranjic) also comes from the village. There is a small rustic villa there, leading people to believe that Vranjic was a vacation destination for rich Salonitan citizens (Salona – Colonia Martia of Iulius Caesar, the present-day town of Solin).

As of 2011 census, Vranjic has a population of 1,110.

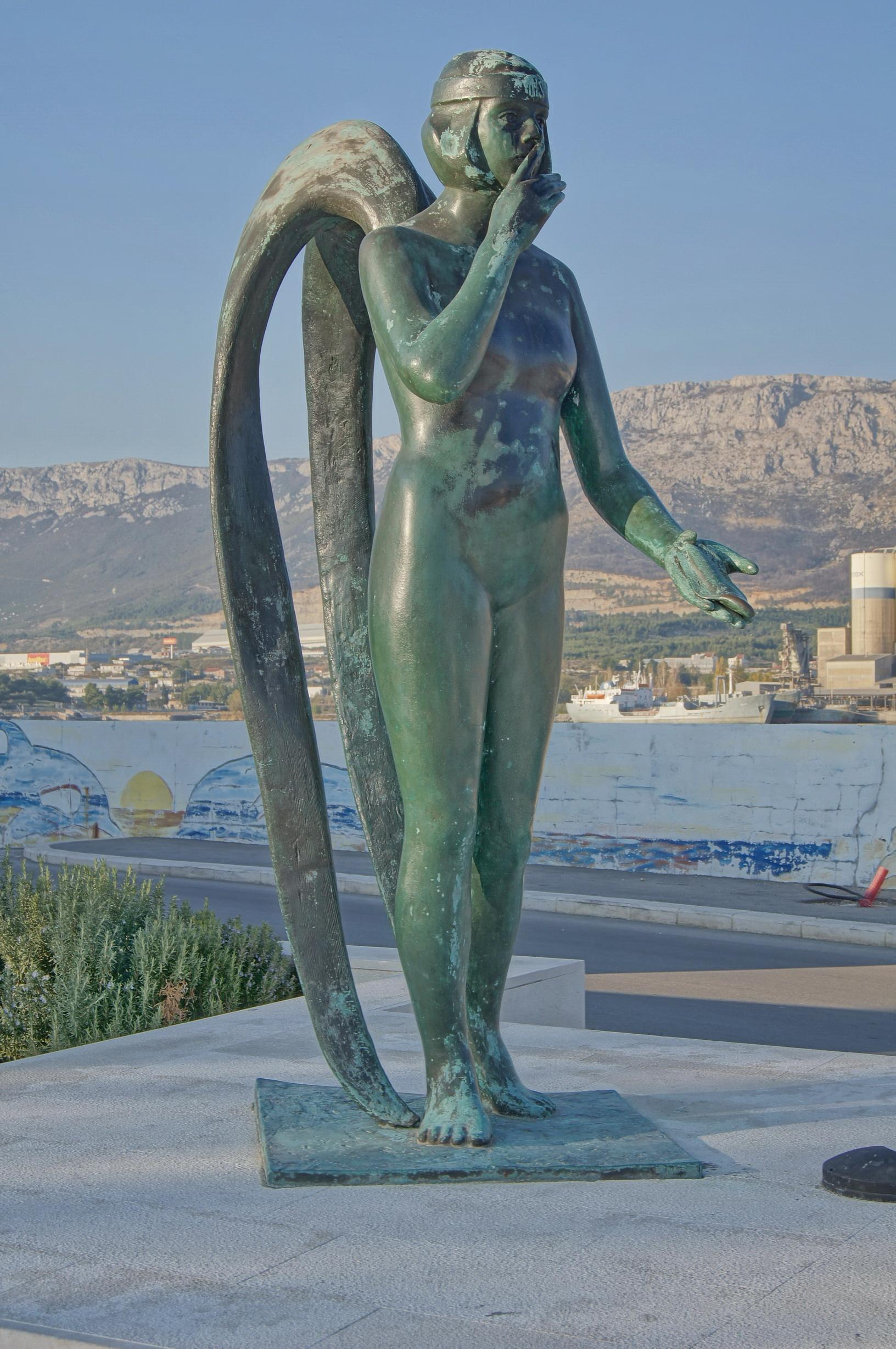
A recognizable statue titled Anđeo Rafael ("Angel Raphael") stays at the entrance to Vranjic

== Notable people ==
- dr. Frane Bulić, archeologist, historian and Roman Catholic priest
- don Luka Jelić
- msgr. Ante Jurić
- Stjepan Benzon, poet

== Industry ==
The former Salonit factory produced asbestos material since 1921. There is also a warehouse of Karlovačka pivovara and INA reservoirs.

== Sport ==
- NK Omladinac Vranjic, football club
- VK Vranjic, waterpolo club
- RK Piaggio, handball club
