= Visovac Monastery =

Island monastery in Visovac Lake, Croatia

- Samostan Visovac
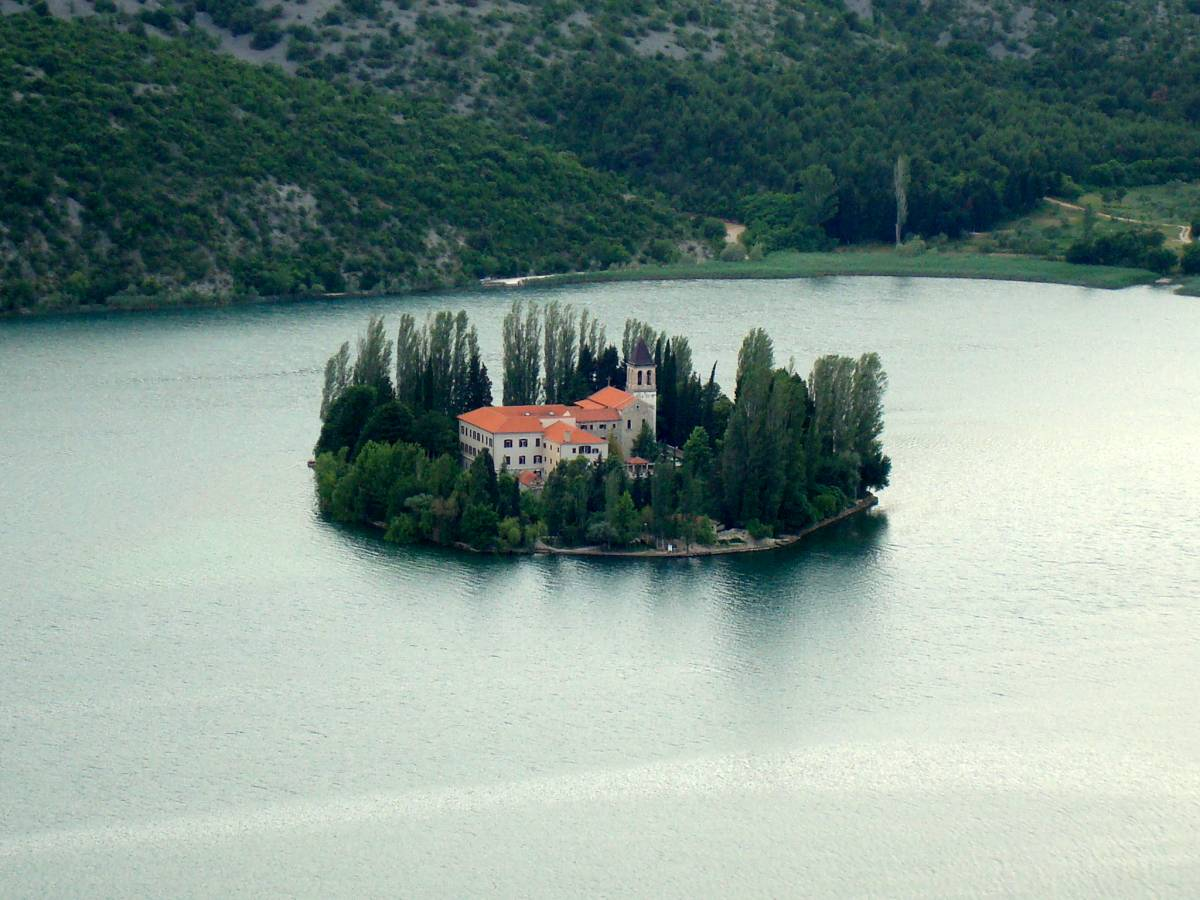
- Visovac Monastery from the air
- Interactive map of Visovac Monastery

Monastery information
- Order: Franciscans
- Established: 1445
- Diocese: Franciscan Province of the Most Holy Redeemer

People
- Founder: Augustinian monks

Site
- Location: Krka National Park; Croatia.
- Coordinates: 43°51′40″N 15°58′24″E

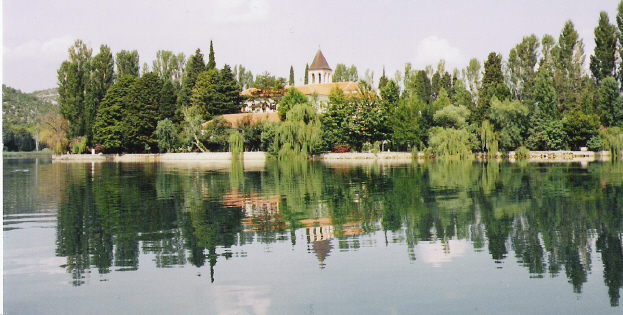
Visovac Monastery viewed from the water

The Visovac Monastery (Croatian: Samostan Visovac), part of the Franciscan Province of the Most Holy Redeemer based in Split, is a Catholic (Roman Rite) monastery on the island of Visovac in the Krka National Park, Croatia. Because of the centuries-long devotion to the Mother of God, Visovac is also called Mother of God Island.

== History ==
Visovac was established in the 14th century by Augustinian monks, who erected a small monastery and church on the island dedicated to the Apostle Paul. In 1445, it was enlarged and adapted by Franciscans, who settled on the island having withdrawn from parts of Bosnia when invading Turks had taken over. A new monastery was constructed in the 18th century.

The oldest preserved part of the current complex dates from the 14th century. The monastery houses a historically significant collection of Christian books and a rich library containing many historical manuscripts and rare books, including a rare incunabula of Aesop's fables (Brescia 1487) printed by the Lastovo printer Dobrić Dobričević, and a collection of documents known as "the sultan's edicts". A sabre once belonging to Vuk Mandušić, one of the best-loved heroes of Serbian epic poetry, is also housed at Visovac.

== Geography ==
The island has 17.376 m of coastline. It has an oval shape about the size of 170 × 120 meters. The southeastern side of the island has an adjacent elongated shallow shelf of triangular shape. Visovac is a 10-minute drive from Drniš, six kilometers from Skradin and is accessible only by boat.

== Gallery ==
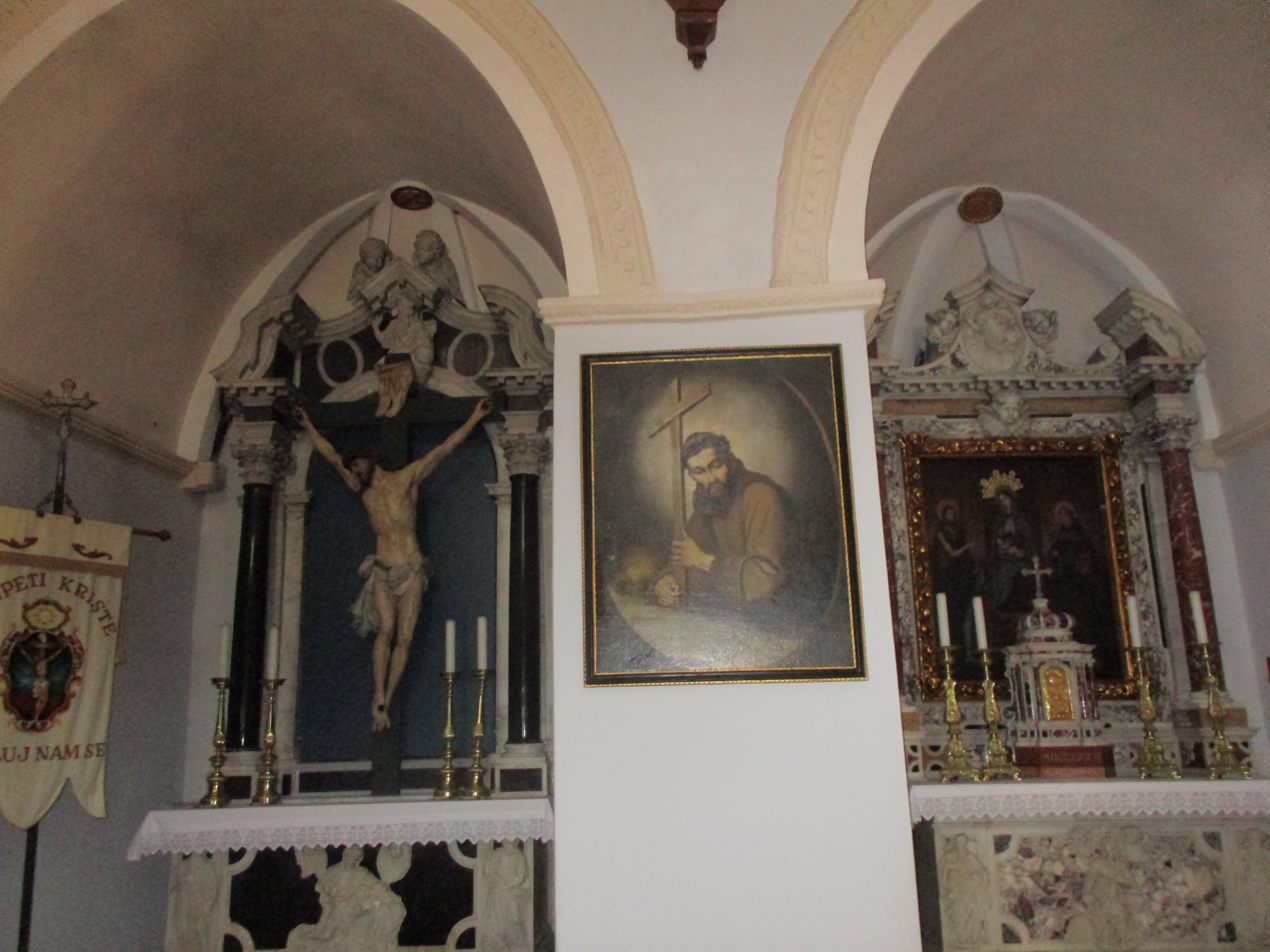

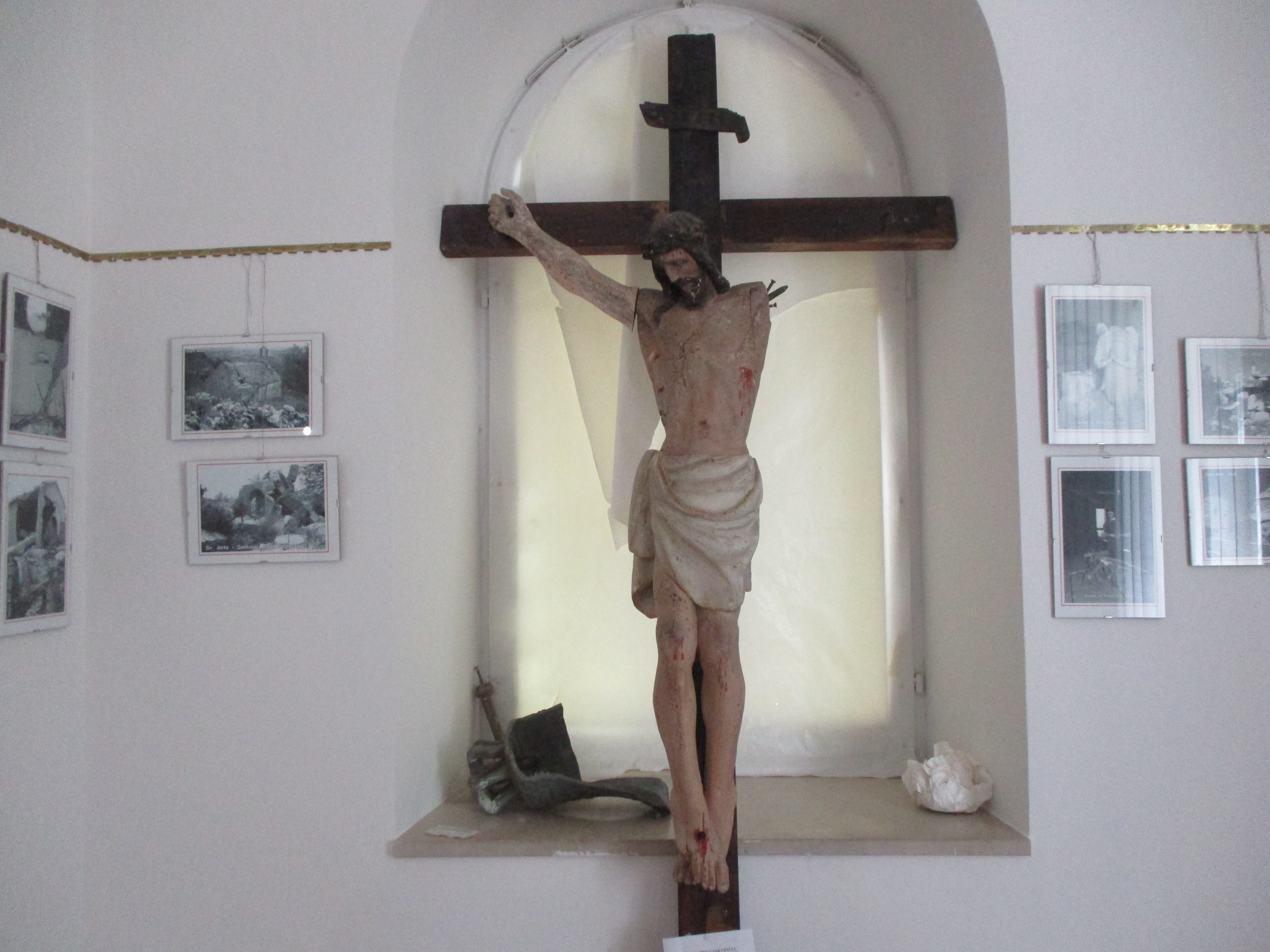

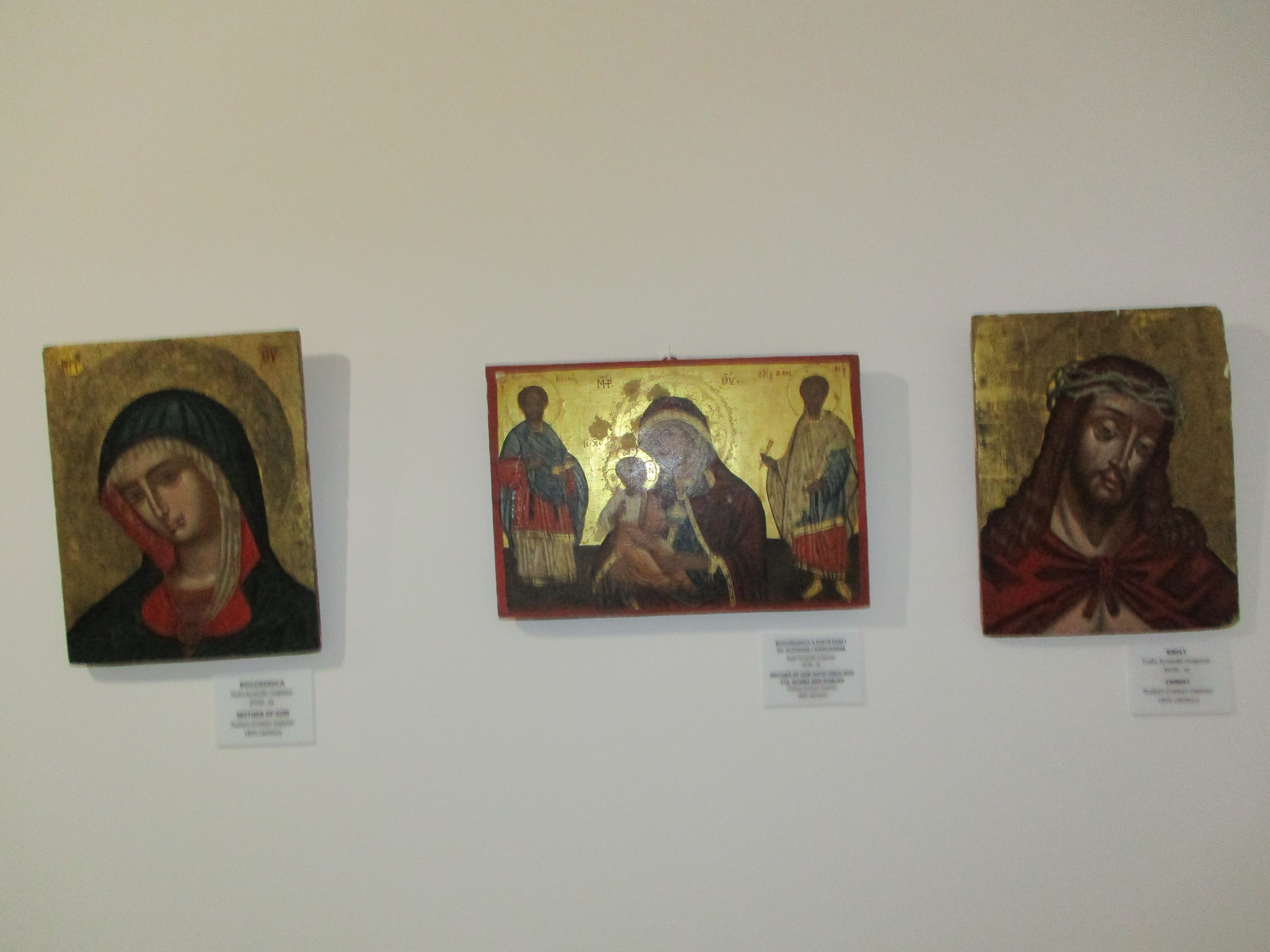

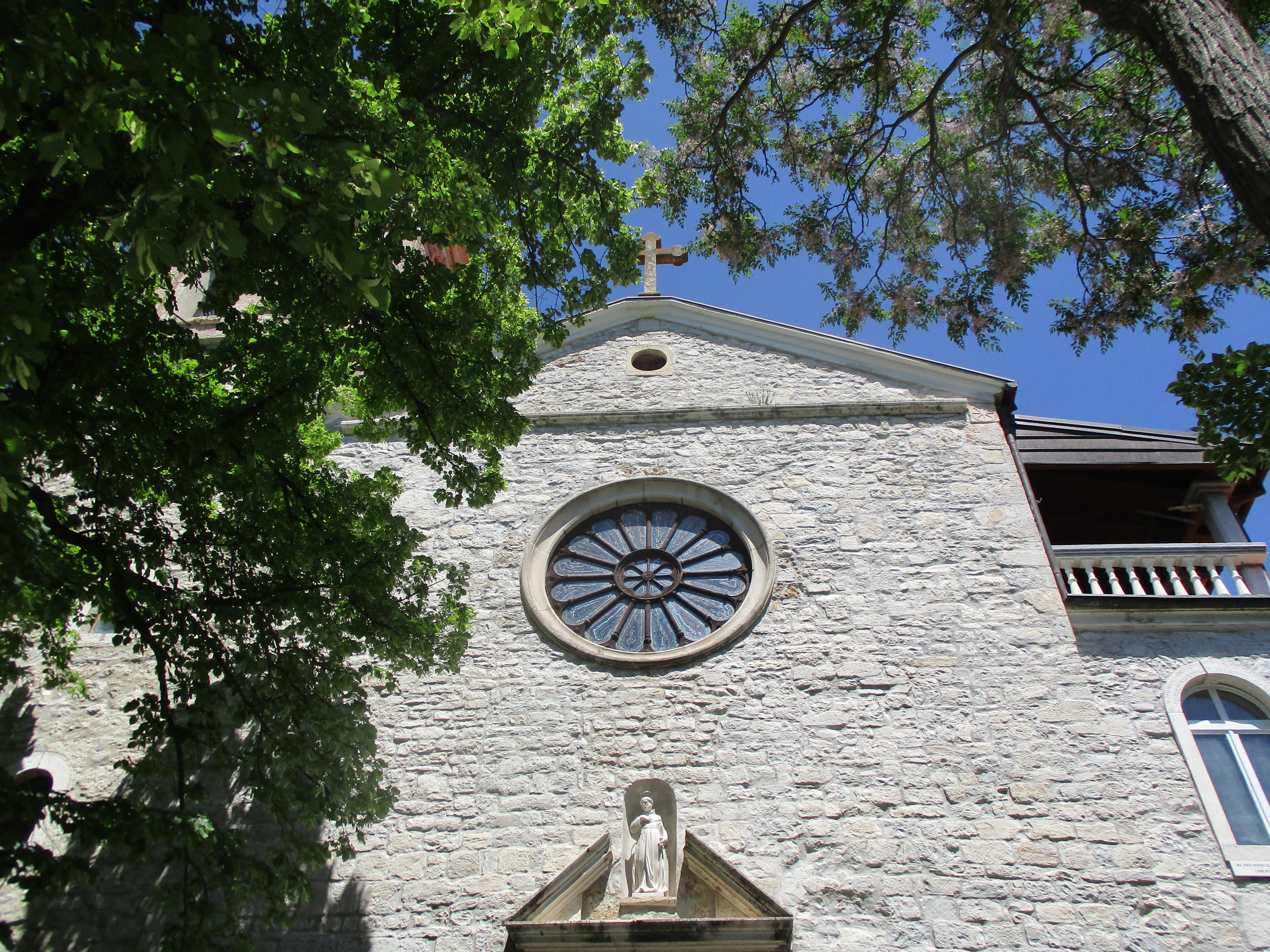

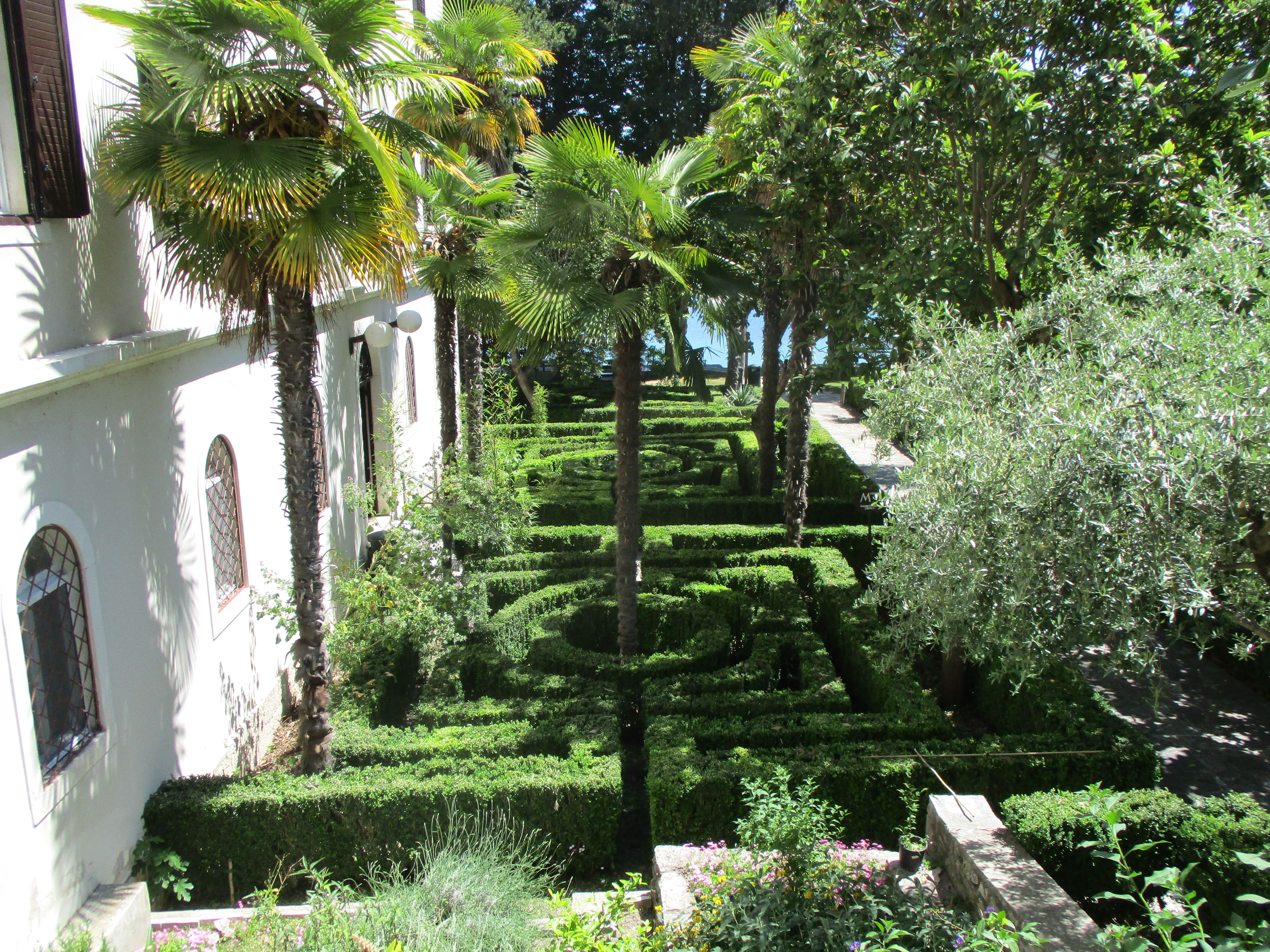

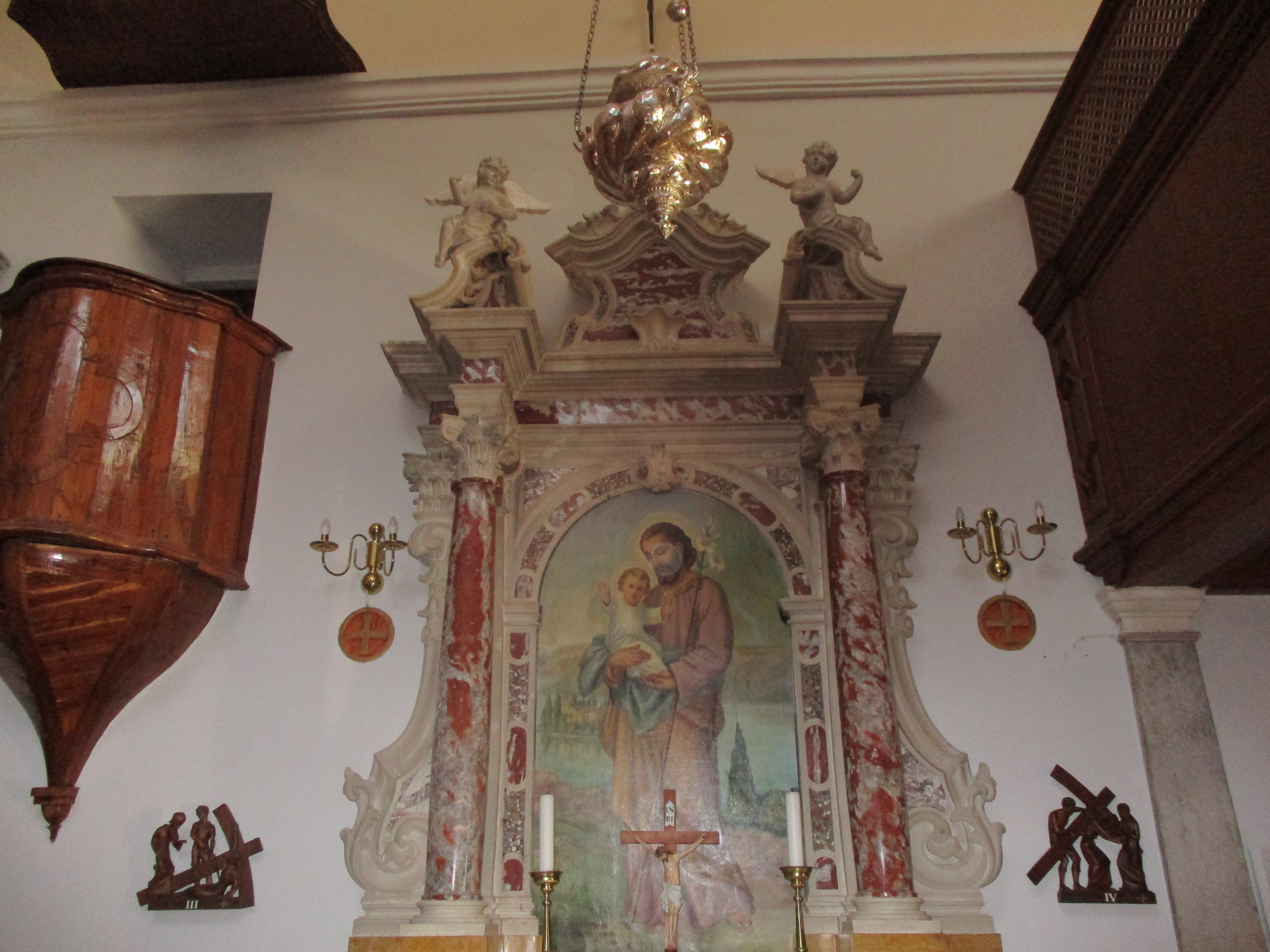

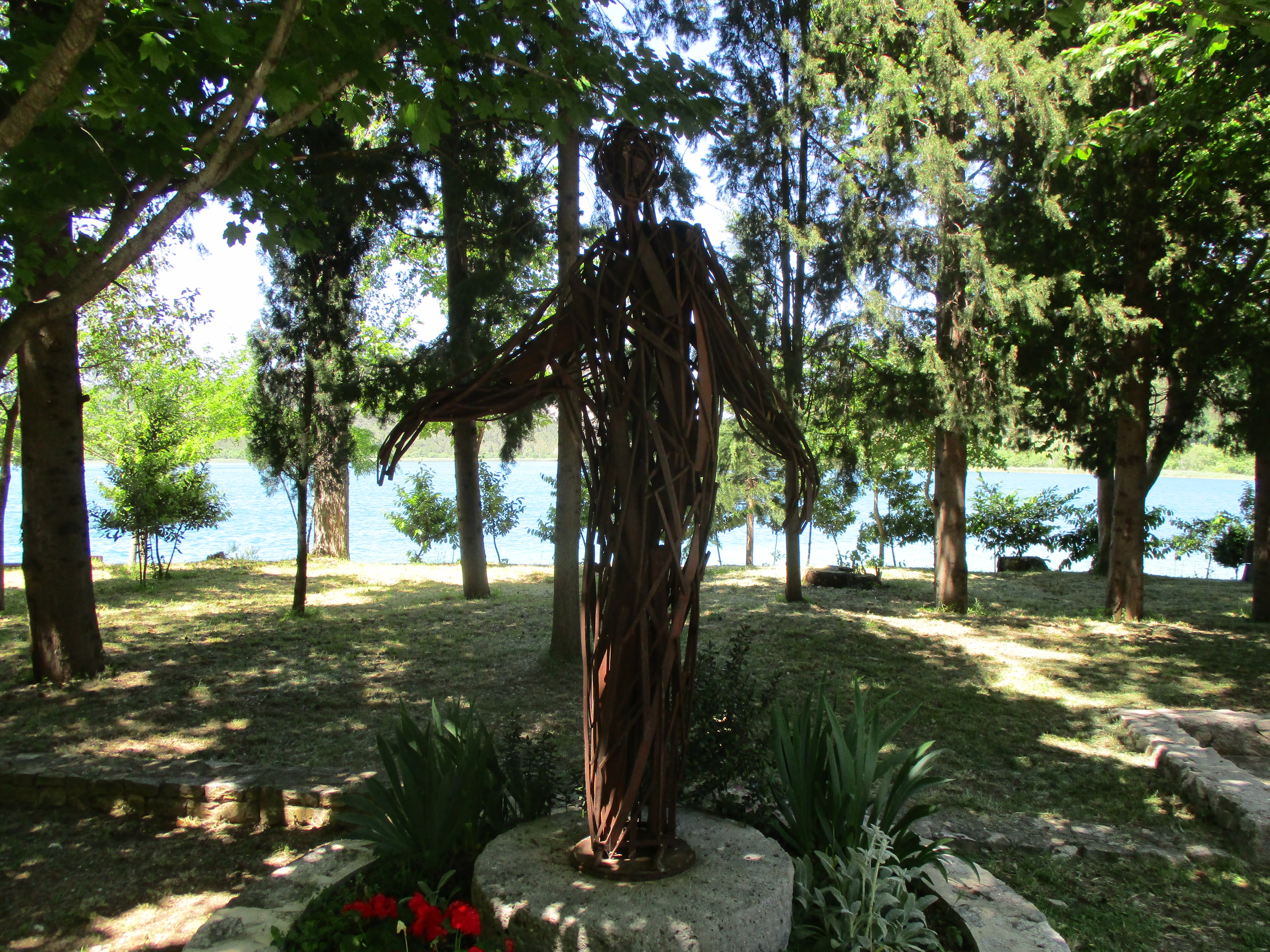

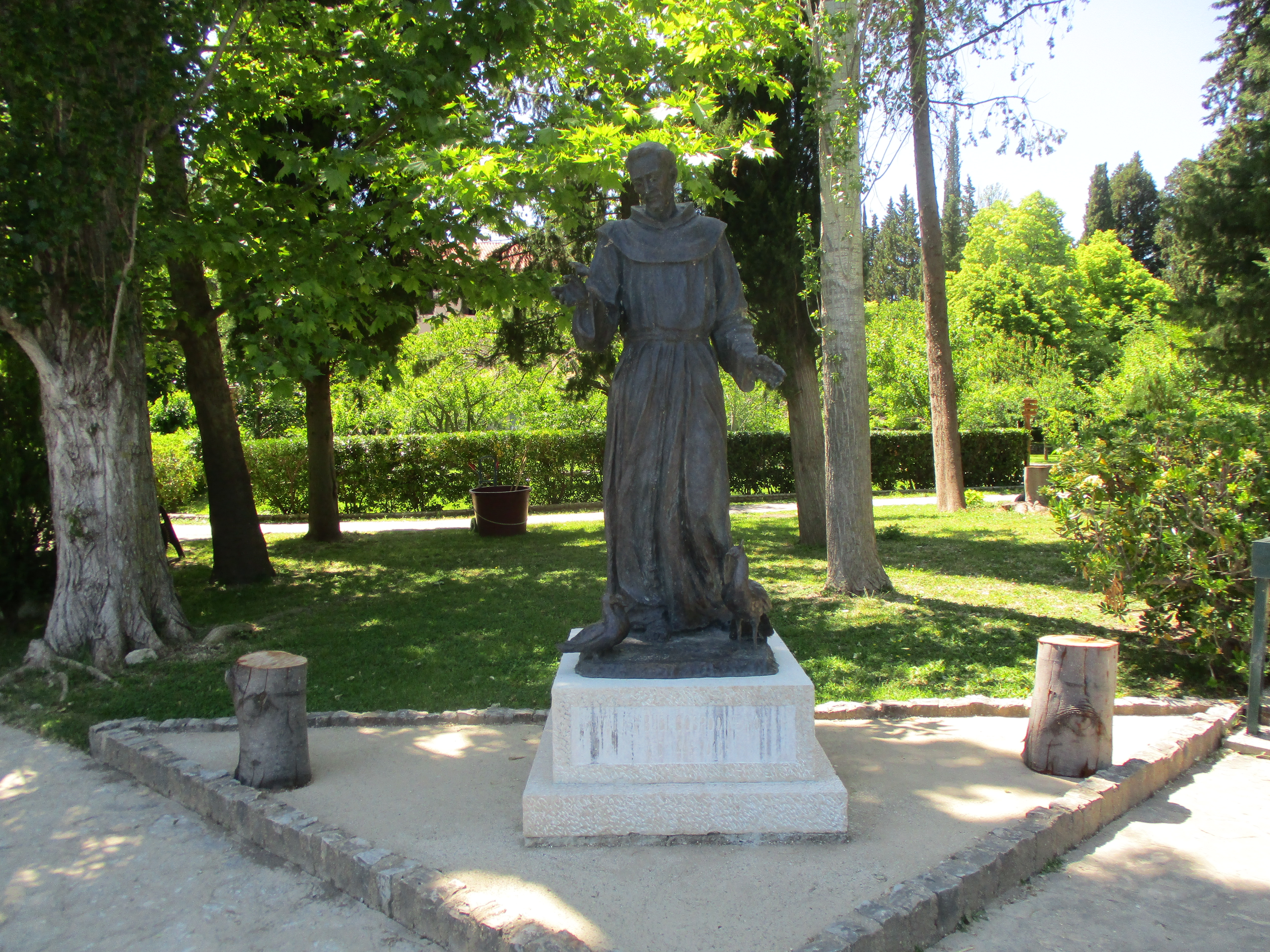
