= Lujo Marun =

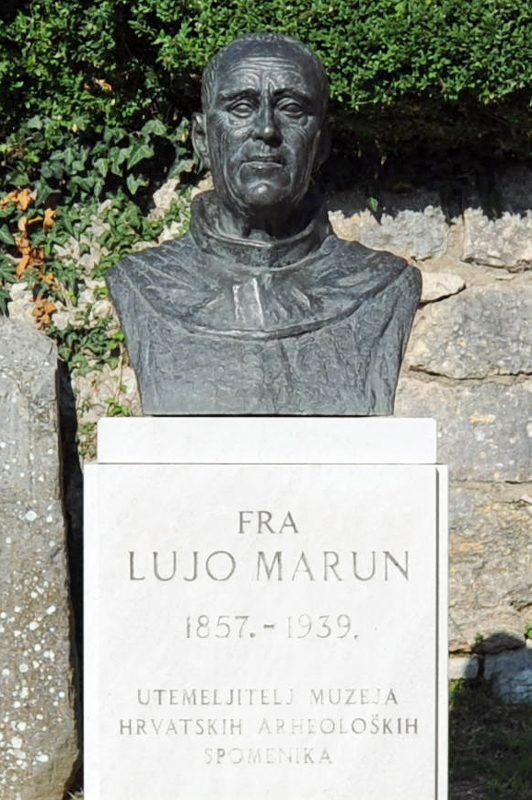
- Bust of Lujo Marun in Knin
- Born: 11 December 1857; Skradin, Kingdom of Dalmatia, Austrian Empire
- Died: 15 January 1939 (aged 81); Knin, SFR Yugoslavia
- Occupation(s): Priest, archeologist, historian

Aloysius "Lujo" Marun (born Stipe Marun 11 December 1857 – 15 January 1939) was a Croatian Franciscan priest, who is known as the pioneer of Croatian archeology.

== Biography ==
He was born as Stipe Marun in the town of Skradin, northern Dalmatia. After finishing primary school in Sinj, he went to Visovac Monastery where he studied to become a Franciscan, taking the monastic name Aloysius (shortened to Lujo). Even before entering the priesthood, Marun's teachers had instilled in him an awakened national consciousness which turned him to research Croatian monuments. He knew that the medieval Croatian kingdom was concentrated in northern Dalmatia, which would be where most of his life's work would take him. Although he was not trained in archeology, he nevertheless participated in excavations in Knin in the early 1880s, and eventually managed to get transferred there in 1885.

He died in Knin in 1939.

== Legacy ==
In 2016, the "Fr. Lujo Marun" Student Residence Hall was opened near the Polytechnic "Marko Marulić" in Knin.

There are several streets named after him throughout Croatia, including Zagreb, Split, Zadar, Skradin, Knin, and Slavonski Brod.

== See also ==
- Frane Bulić

== Sources ==
- Zekan, Mate (2007). "Fra Lujo Marun (1857 - 1939), Founder, Missionary and Visionary of Croatian Archaeology, Science and Patriotism". Starohrvatska Prosvjeta. 34 (III).
