= Helen of Zadar =

Queen Consort of Croatia

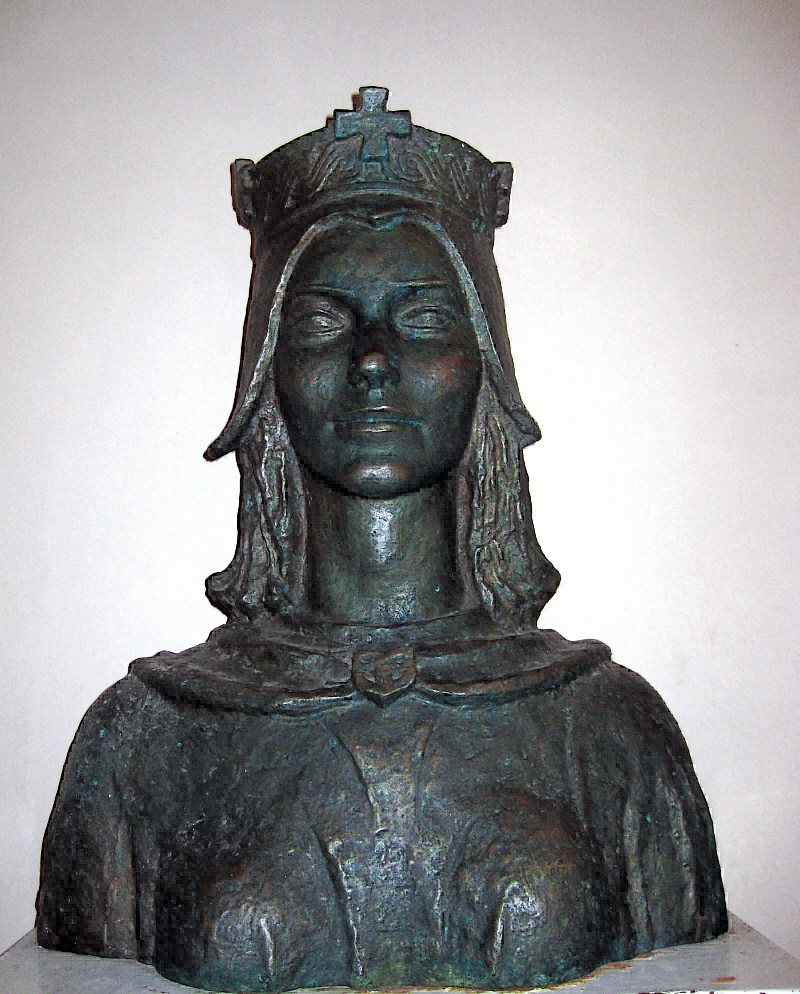
- Bust of queen Helen by sculptor Ivan Mirković, made for thousandth anniversary of her death.

Regent of Croatia
- Regency: 969–976

Queen consort of Croatia
- Tenure: 949–969
- Coronation: 949
- Born: Zadar
- Died: 8 October 976
- Burial: Church of St. Mary, Solin
- Spouse: Michael Krešimir II
- House: Trpimirović (by marriage); Madi (by birth)

Helen of Zadar (Croatian: Jelena) (died 8 October 976), also known as Helen the Glorious (Croatian: Jelena Slavna), was the queen consort of the Kingdom of Croatia, as the wife of King Michael Krešimir II, from 946 to 969, a period which was marked by "peace, order and expeditious growth". She was the regent of Croatia after the death of her spouse during the minority of her son Stephen Držislav of Croatia, and ruled from 969 until 976.

== Life ==
She is said to have originated from the old patrician family Madi from Zadar. She married Michael Krešimir II, and became queen consort in 949.

She became the queen dowager of Croatia after the death of her husband in 969. However, since her husband was succeeded by their son who was a minor, she also became the regent of Croatia on behalf of her son. As such, she ruled until her own death.

=== Regency ===
According to the Thomas the Archdeacon's 13th century Historia Salonitana, Queen Helen built the churches of St. Stephen and St. Mary in Salona (today's Solin). The atrium of the St. Stephen became the Mausoleum of Croatian Kings and is preserved to the present day.

...sancti Stephani et sancte Marie in Salona cum omnibus earum bonis. Has siquidem ecclesias edificauit et dotauit quedam Helena regina, donans eas Spalatine sedi iure perpetuo possidendas. Que ob reuerentiam regalium sepulchrorum concesse fuerant quibusdam regularibus ad tempus, qui assidue in eis officiorum ministeria exercebant. Ibi namque magnificus uir Cresimirus rex, in atrio uidelicet basilice sancti Stephani, tumulatus est cum pluribus aliis regibus et reginis.

Jelena played a central role in uniting Croatian and Latin elements within the Kingdom thus laying the groundwork for her son, Stephen Držislav, to assume sovereignty over the Dalmatian thema (which was under nominal Byzantine rule).

=== Epitaph ===
Helen died in October 976 and is buried next to her husband in St Mary's. The royal inscription on her sarcophagus was an epitaph discovered by archaeologists. The epitaph, which shed light on the genealogy of early Croatian rulers, was discovered by Don Frane Bulić on 28 August 1898. The epitaph also shows that older rulers, prior to her son Stephen Držislav, bore the title of kings. The Latin and English translation of the epitaph reads:

IN HOC TUMULO QUIESCIT HELENA FAMOSA, QUE FUIT UXOR MIHAELI REGI, MATERQUE STEFANI REGIS, HABENAS RENUIT REGNI. VIII IDUS MENSIS OCTOBRIS IN PACE HIC ORDINATA FUIT ANNO AB INCARNATIONE DOMINI DCCLXXVI INDICTIONE IV, CICLO LUNARE V, EPACTA XVII, CICLO SOLARI FIT PUPILLORUIM TUTORQUE VIDUARUM. ICQUE ASPICIENS VIR ANIME DIC MISERERE DEUS.

In this grave rests the famous Jelena who was the wife of King Michael and mother of King Stjepan. She ruled the kingdom. On the eighth day before the Ides of October she was buried here in peace 976 years of the fourth indiction after the incarnation of the Lord, in the fifth cycle of the Moon, the seventeenth epact, and the fifth cycle of the Sun which is concurrent with the sixth. And she who during her life was a queen, was also the mother of orphans and the protectress of widows. May he who looks (hereon) say: 'Lord, have mercy on her soul!'.

== Gallery ==
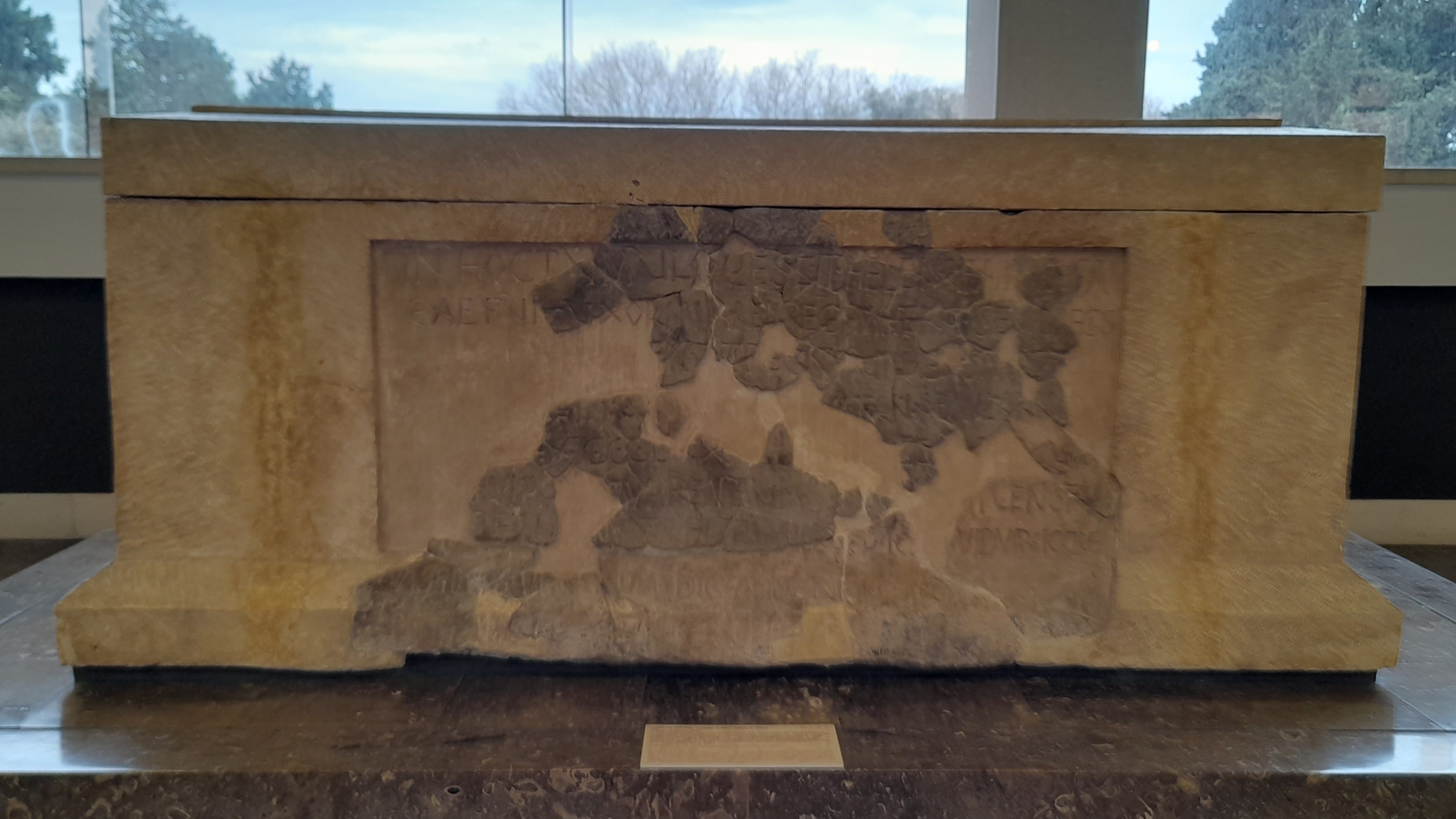
Reconstructed original Helen's epitaph in Museum of Croatian Archeological Monuments in Split.

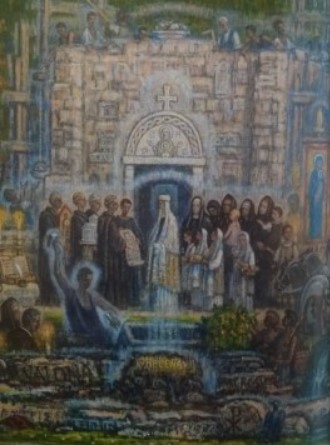
"Building of a church on the island" by Vjekoslav Paraća, Queen Helen is shown in the centre
