= Mongol invasion of Hungary =

Mongol invasion of Hungary may refer to:

- First Mongol invasion of Hungary, 1241–1242
  - Battle of Mohi
- Second Mongol invasion of Hungary, 1285–1286
