= Roman Catholic Diocese of Knin =

The Diocese of Knin (Latin: Tininum, also Tinum) was founded in 1050 and is today a titular see of the Latin Church of the Catholic Church. Its cathedra was located in Knin, Croatia.

== History ==
Medieval diocese of Knin on a map

The history of the diocese of Knin can be traced from the mid-11th century when a court bishop was established by the Kings of Croatia under the title "Bishop of the Croats" (episcopus Chroatorum). Its see was originally located in the Romanesque church of Saint Mary in the royal village of Biskupija near Knin. Following the 1185 ecclesial council in Split, the bishop was transferred to Knin, and renamed "Bishop of Knin". The construction of a new cathedral was initiated in 1203, on the basis of a previous 10th-century royal monastery in Kapitul, and was consecrated during the tenure of Bishop Nicholas (1270-1272).

A history of the successive bishops, from Mark in 1050 to Joseph in 1755, is given in Daniele Farlati's Illyricum sacrum, IV (Venice, 1775). The bishops who held the title no longer resided in Knin after it fell to the Ottoman Turks in 1522. After Venice captured the area in 1768, the bishop of Roman Catholic Diocese of Šibenik was appointed to administer the diocese. In 1828 Pope Leo XII erected the ecclesiastical province of Dalmatia in the Kingdom of Dalmatia, in the papal bull Locum Beati Petri, through which he suppressed the diocese and transferred its territory to the Diocese of Šibenik.

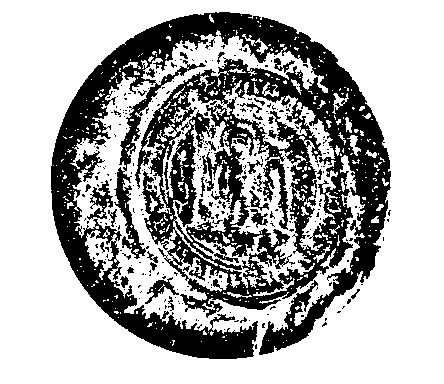
Seal of the Knin bishopric from 1492

== List of bishops ==
=== Residential bishops ===
- Marco Giudice (mentioned in 1052)
- Raniero (<1059 - 1069)
- Anastasio I (1069 - ?)
- Gregorio (<1074 - >1075)
- Pietro (1080 - ?)
- Anastasio II (mentioned in 1111)
- V. (mentioned in 1145 circa)
- Dede (1162 - ?)
- Flasco (<1177 - >1187)
- Giorgio (<1196 - >1199)
- Unnamed bishop (? - 11 June 1208)
- Michus (circa 1210 - >1226)
- Ladislav (circa 1263 - death circa 1272)
- Nikola I (1272 - death 1274)
- Y. (1274 - >1275)
- Pierre Boncher (1290 - ?)
- Leonardo da Spalato (? - death 1322)
- Giovanni de Cors (16 September 1334 - 1 October 1337), later Bishop of Tivoli (Italy) (1337.10.01 – death 1342)
- Tommaso (mentioned in 1339)
- Nikola II (mentioned in 1344)
- Dionizije Lacković (24 March 1348 - 1349), later Bishop of Zagreb (Croatia) (1349 – 1350.01.11), Metropolitan Archbishop of Kalocsa (Hungary) (1350.01.11 – ?)
- Blaž (4 September 1354 - ?)
- Johann von Töckheim (28 April 1357 - 6 March 1364), later Bishop of Gurk (Austria) (1364.03.06 – death 1376.02.29)
- Miklós I (5 September 1365 - 16 May 1373), later Bishop of Csanád (Hungary) (1373.05.16 – 1375)
- Pál (16 May 1373 - death >1388)
- uncanonical Pierre de Marnhac (19 February 1386 - ?) (pretender)
- Michele da Ragusa (2 June 1390 - ?)
- László (21 May 1397 - ? deposto)
- Miklós II (10 March 1406 - ?)
- Miklós III (5 December 1418 - ?)
- Ivan (21 May 1428 - death circa 1438)
- Demetrij Čupor Moslavački 1° (4 July 1438 - 13 February 1447 see below), next Bishop of Zagreb (Croatia) (1447.02.13 – 1453.07.18)
- Benedikt de Zolio (13 February 1447 - 18 July 1453), previously Bishop of Zagreb (Croatia) (1440 – 1447.02.13); later again Bishop of Zagreb (Croatia) (1453.07.18 – 1454)
- Demetrij Čupor Moslavački 2° (see above 18 July 1453 - 14 June 1465) (for the second time), next again Bishop of Zagreb (Croatia) (1465.06.14 – 1466.04.14), finally Bishop of Győr (Hungary) (1466.04.14 – 1480)
- Franjo Speravić (or Sperančić) (2 January 1460 - ?)
- Marco da Fiume (16 September 1464 - ?), previously Bishop of Senj (Croatia) (1461.07.04 – 1464.09.16)
- Miklós IV (24 July 1467 - ?)
- (?) Niccolò de Monte (29 March 1476 - 14 February 1483)
- Brizio (14 November 1492 - >1494), previously Bishop of Croia (1476.03.29 – 1483.02.14); later Bishop of Chersonissos (1483.02.14 – 1489?)
- (?) Martino (15 December 1507 - ?)
- (?) Andrea Lagogne (24 August 1515 - ? )
- (?) Matthaeus Unadopya (20 April 1517 - ?)
- (?) Ferdinandus de Saxamone (17 December 1517 - ?)
- (?) Franciscus de Reucon (de Treio) (10 December 1518 - ?)
- Andrea (20 June 1525 - ?)
- (?) Jean de Vaulx (16 April 1540 - ?)
- (?) Jean Vallier (1º March 1542 - ?), later Bishop of Grasse (France) (1551 – 1565)
- Matthias Zabergyei (4 July 1550 - 3 August 1554), later Bishop of Oradea Mare (Romania) (1554.08.03 – 1556)
- Pavao de Churina (3 August 1554 - <1556)
- János Újlaky (1558 - 17 July 1560), later Bishop of Vác (Hungary) (1560.07.17 – death 1578)
- Andrija Dudić (Andreas Dudith) (28 January 1562 – 1563)), later Bishop of Csanád (Hungary) (1563 – 1565.02.09), Bishop of Pécs (Hungary) (1565.02.09 – 1567 deposed)
- István Fejérkővy (26 January 1571 - 15 May 1573), later Bishop of Veszprém (Hungary) (1573.05.15 – 1588.12.19), Bishop of Nitra (Slovakia) (1588.12.19 – 1596.06.07), Metropolitan Archbishop of Esztergom (Hungary) (1596.06.07 – death 1596.11.20)
- Zakariás Mossóczy (Zachariáš Mošóci) (15 May 1573 - 27 October 1578), later Bishop of Vác (Hungary) (1578.10.27 – 1583.10.07), Bishop of Nitra (Slovakia) (1583.10.07, death 1586.04.10)
- Petar Herešinec (28 May 1584 - 8 March 1585), later Bishop of Zagreb (Croatia) (1585.03.08 – 1587.10.26), Bishop of Győr (Hungary) (1587.10.26 – death 1590.06.10)
- János Cserödy (20 February 1589 - 5 August 1597); later, uncanonically, Bishop of Pécs (Hungary) (1593.07.19 – 1596.06.17) and Bishop of Roman Catholic Diocese of Eger (Hungary) (1596.06.17 – death 1597.08.05)
- Miklós Mikáczy (? - 16 April 1598), later Bishop of Risano (1551.03.04 – 1600.12.20), Bishop of Pécs (Hungary) (1600.12.20 – death 1605)
- Matija Drašković (20 December 1600 - ?)
- (?) Mátyás Máthészy (1608 - ?)
- (?) Pál David (1610 - 6 October 1631)
- János Jovanczy (26 June 1634 - death <1644)
- Juraj Bjelavić (8 January 1646 - death <1667)
- Cristóbal de Rojas y Spínola (16 January 1668 - 3 March 1687), later Bishop of Wiener Neustadt ([1685.07.27] 1687.05.03 – death 1695.03.12)
- Aleksandar Ignacije Mikulić Brokunovečki (24 November 1687 - 11 October 1688), later Bishop of Zagreb (Croatia) ([1688.01.16] 1688.10.11 – death 1694.05.11)
- Blažej Jáklin (29 November 1688 - 26 November 1691), Bishop of Nitra (Slovakia) (1691.11.26 – death 1695.10.19)
- Miklós Antal Esterházy (6 October 1692 - death 5 August 1695)
- Franz Ferdinand von Rummel (2 April 1696 - 4 October 1706), later Bishop of Wien (Vienna) (Austria) ([1706.04.11] 1706.10.04 – death 1716.03.15)
- András Matusseck (12 March 1708 - death 1713)
- György Gyllany (7 May 1714 - death 1728)
- Gregor Sorger (8 March 1728 - 7 September 1729), later Bishop of Transilvania (Romania) ([1729.02.25] 1729.09.07 – death 1739)
- Sándor Máriássy (8 February 1730 - death 19 April 1755)
- Jozef Karol Zbiško (15 December 1755 - death circa 1773)
- János Szily (János Szily di Felsőszopor) (24 April 1775 - 23 June 1777), later Bishop of Szombathely (Hungary) (1777.02.17 – death 1799.01.02)
- József Pierer (12 July 1779 - death 1806), previously Bishop of Šibenik (Croatia) (1779.07.12 – ?)
- Dávid Szolnai (6 October 1806 - ?)
- László Csáky de Keresztszegh (10 July 1815 - ?)

=== Titular bishops ===
It is vacant, having had the following incumbents, all of the lowest (episcopal) rank :

- Alex Jordánsky (28 February 1831 - 15 February 1840)
- Martin Miskolczy (14 December 1840 - ?)
- Josef Krautmann (15 March 1852 - ?)
- János Nehiba (20 December 1855 - 1875)
- József Lányi (7 November 1906 - 28 September 1931)
- Leopoldo Buteler (8 January 1932 - 13 September 1934)
- Joseph Laurent Philippe (25 April 1935 - 9 October 1935)
- Adolfo Vorbuchner (18 April 1936 - 28 May 1938)
- Luis Guízar y Barragán (7 October 1938 - 5 April 1954)
- Manuel Pereira da Costa (31 May 1954 - 20 June 1959)
- Maurits Gerard De Keyzer (24 April 1962 - 19 January 1994)
- Jean-Pierre Blais (3 November 1994 - 12 December 2008)
- Sebastian Francis Shah (14 February 2009 - 14 November 2013)
- Pierre Olivier Tremblay (21 May 2018 - 24 Jun 2022)

== Source and External links ==
- GigaCatholic with incumbent biography links

Catholic-hierarchy
