= Frane Bulić =

Croatian historian (1846–1934)

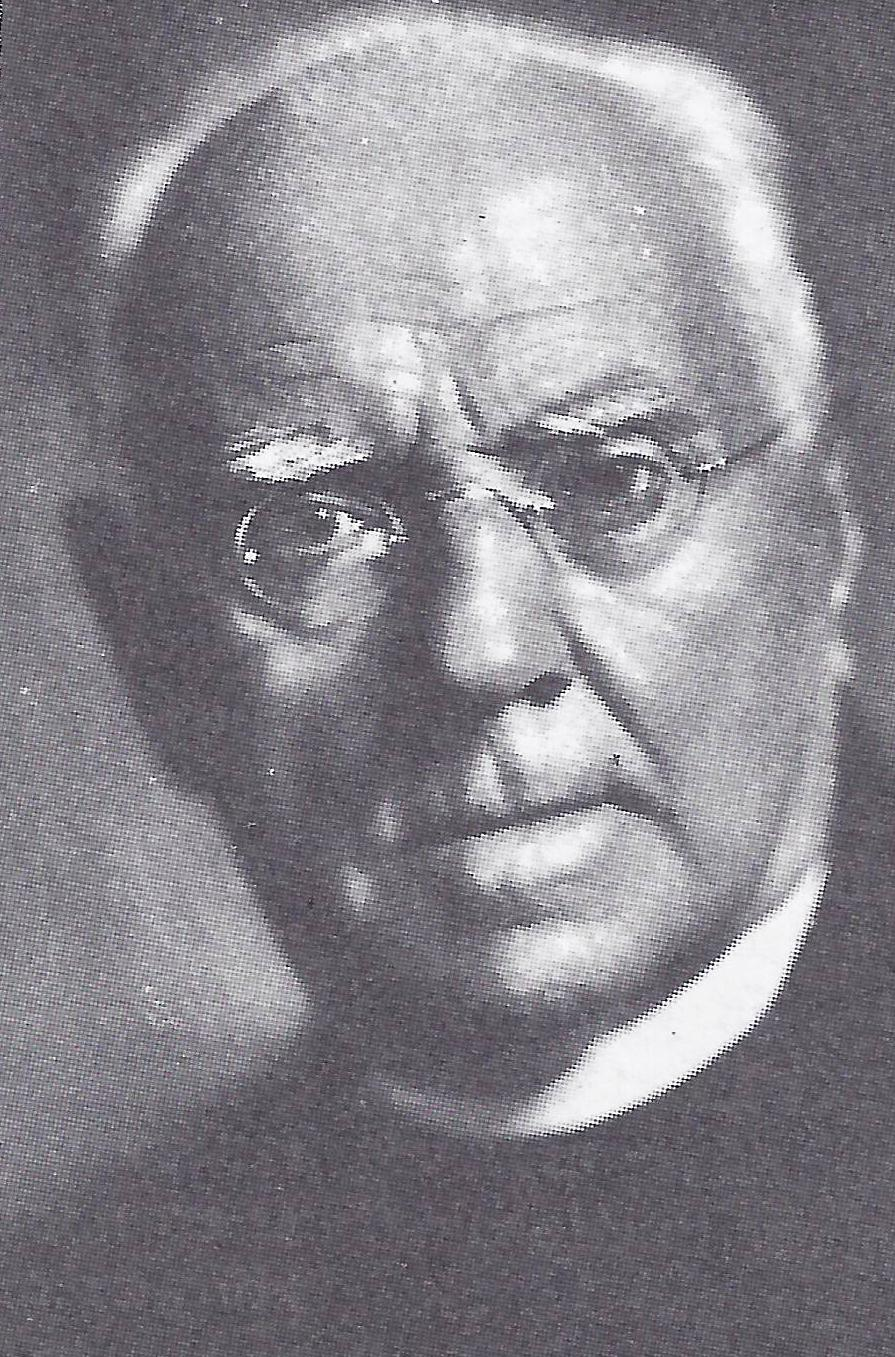

Member of the Imperial Council for the XI. Electoral District in the Kingdom of Dalmatia - Split
- In office 1907–1910
- Preceded by: District created
- Succeeded by: Josip Smodlaka

Personal details
- Born: Vranjic, Kingdom of Dalmatia, Austrian Empire
- Died: July 29, 1934 Zagreb, Kingdom of Yugoslavia
- Party: Independent
- Profession: Priest, archaeologist, and historian

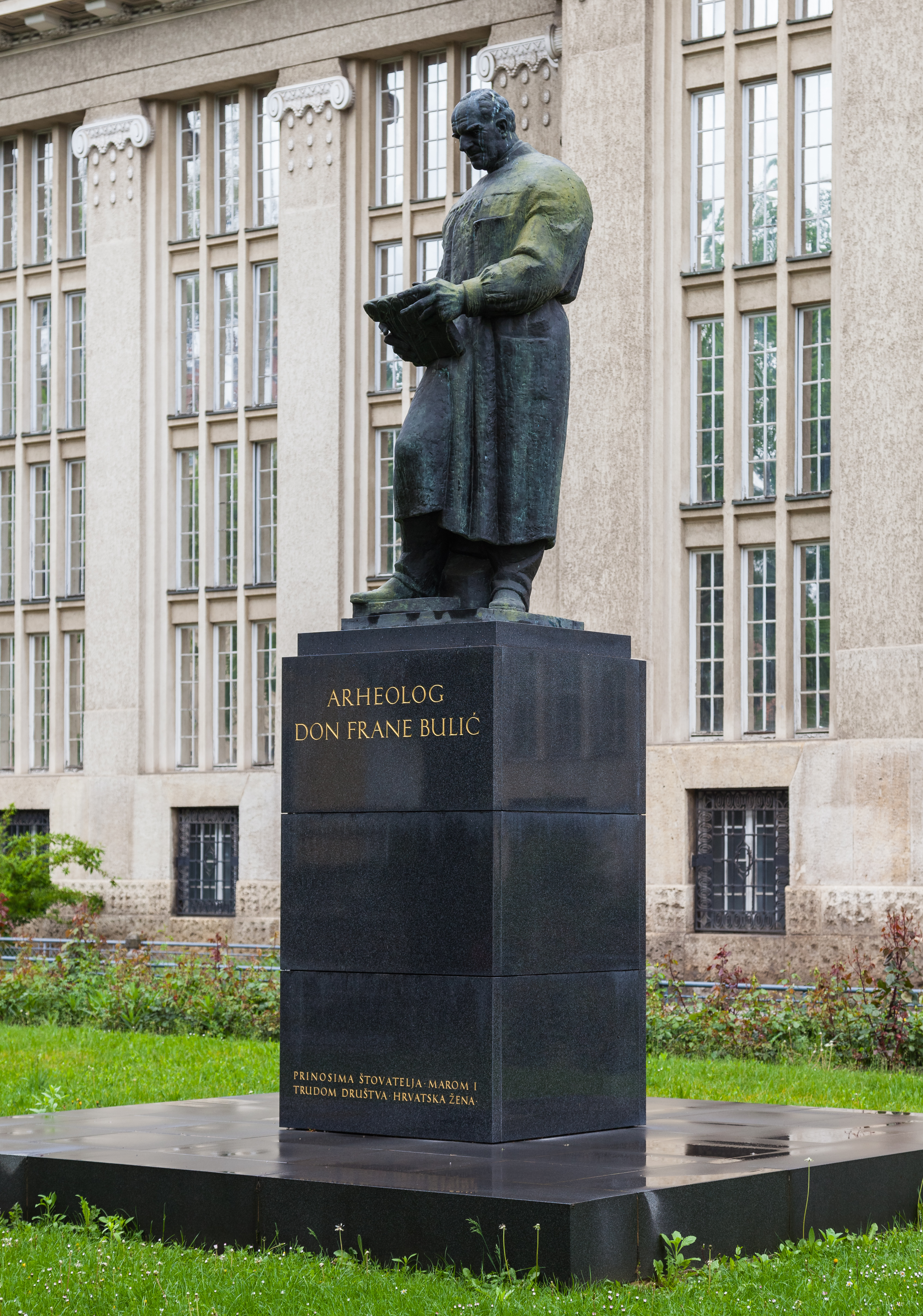
Statue of Frane Bulić in front of the State Archives in Zagreb

Frane Bulić (October 4, 1846 - July 29, 1934) was a Croatian priest, archaeologist, and historian.

== Biography ==
Bulić was born in Vranjic (now part of Solin), and studied theology in Zadar and then classical philology and archeology in Vienna. He became the curator of the Split Archaeological Museum, and was entrusted with the conservation of cultural and historical antiquities over all of Dalmatia.

He was also active politically. He was elected the representative of the county of Split in the Dalmatian parliament and as representative of Dalmatia in the Imperial Council in Vienna. He withdrew from politics during the time of the Kingdom of Yugoslavia, after the Sixth of January dictatorship proclaimed by Aleksandar Karađorđević in 1929.

His archeological discoveries provided great contributions to the understanding of early Christian and Croatian history in Dalmatia. Bulić led archaeological expeditions in many locations, but especially in Solin. He discovered a basilica within the local monastery which contained the buried martyrs Doimus and Venantius from the time of the Roman Emperor Diocletian.

In 1891, he discovered a piece of stone which contained an inscription of the early Croatian ruler, knez Trpimir. In 1898 he found the sarcophagus of queen Jelena dating back to 976. Together with his associates, he succeeded in putting the writing on the damaged piece together to figure out the complete inscription. Historians consider this one of the most important documents of Croatian history in the Middle Ages because it provided information about the genealogy of Croatian kings.

Also near Solin, Bulić discovered the foundations of the Church of Saint Mary and the Church of Saint Stephen, in which members of the Croatian ruling houses were buried, including king Mihajlo Krešimir II and his wife Jelena of Zadar who was a benefactress of the churches.

In 1894 Bulić founded the Bihać organization for the preservation of history from the age of Croatian national rulers. His reputation helped Split and Solin host the first International Congress of Christian Archaeology in 1894. He was also a member of many local and international archeological organizations. Bulić published many articles and books, the most notable of which are: Hrvatski spomenici u kninskoj okolici uz ostale suvremene dalmatinske iz doba narodne hrvatske dinastije (Croatian monuments in the Knin area and Dalmatia from the age of Croatian national dynasties), Palača cara Dioklecijana u Splitu (Palace of Emperor Diocletian in Split), Stopama hrvatskih narodnih vladara (The steps of the Croatian national rulers).

Bulić died in 1934 in Zagreb. His funeral was conducted by bishops Kvirin Klement Bonefačić and Aloysius Stepinac.

== Honours ==
Bulic was a Papal Chamberlain and he was awarded several orders and decorations, including Commander 2nd Class of the Royal Saxon Albrecht Order 23.03.1908
