= Promina (mountain) =

Coordinates: 43°55′29″N 16°10′12″E

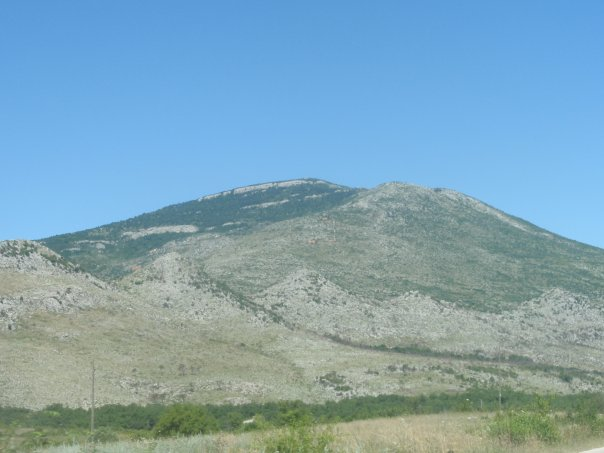

Highest point

Geography
- Location within Croatia

Promina is a mountain in inland Dalmatia, Croatia. Its highest peak is Čavnovka (also called Velika Promina) at 1,148 m.a.s.l.
