= Croatian pre-Romanesque art and architecture =

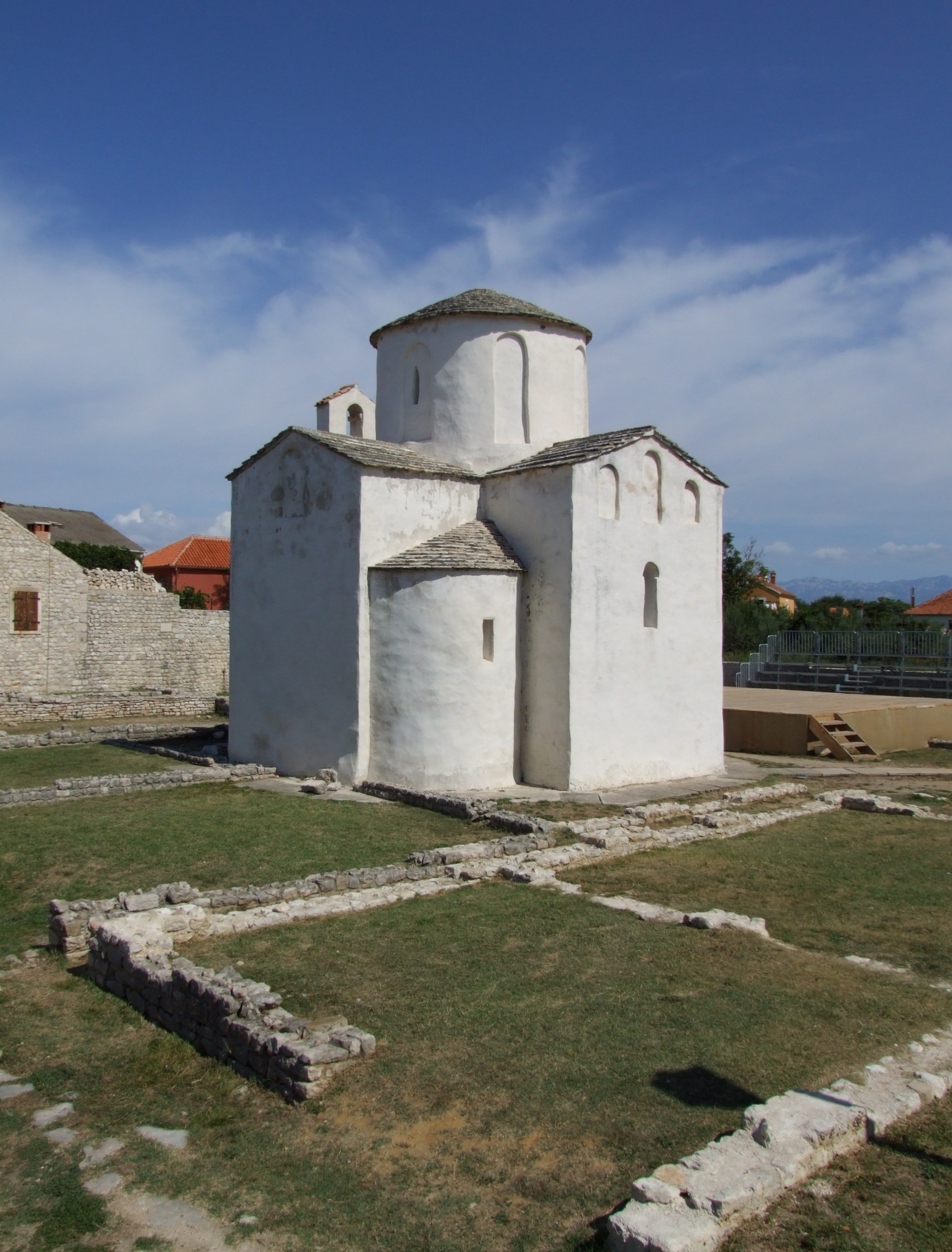
Church of the Holy Cross, Nin, from the 9-11th century.

Croatian Pre-Romanesque art and architecture (Cree: Starohrvatska umjetnost) or Old Croatian Art is Pre-Romanesque art and architecture of Croatia from the arrival of the Croats to the Eastern Adriatic coast till the end of the 11th century when begins the dominance of Romanesque style in art; that was the time of Croatian rulers of the Duchy and Kingdom of Croatia. The Croatian coast and islands "rank among the richest European macro-regions of the epoch", with over a hundred preserved or researched structures, and many reliefs.

== Background ==
=== History ===
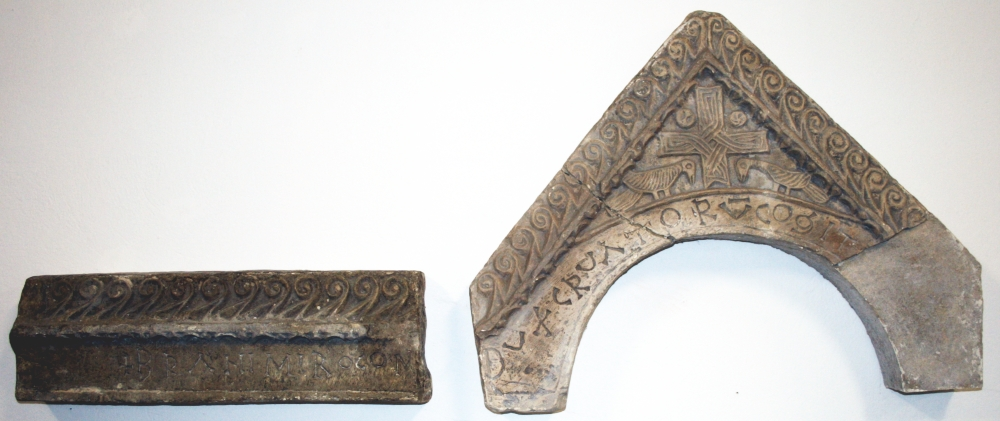
Croatian interlace with the inscription of duke Branimir's name and Croatian ethnonym (Cruatoru[m]) from a church of St. Jerome, Šopot, late 9th century.

First Croatian ruler that certainly received pope's recognition of his country was duke Branimir, who was called by Pope John VIII dux Chroatorum in his letter in 879. First king of Kingdom of Croatia, Tomislav from the House of Trpimirović was crowned around year 925 as rex Chroatorum, and the kingdom continued its peak until the reign of Petar Krešimir IV (1058–1074) and last native king Demetrius Zvonimir (1075–1089).

During the time of Croatian rulers the country was rarely ruled from one place and royal court would move from town to town in which there was a royal castle. The most important royal cities were Nin, Biograd na Moru and Knin. Other bigger cities were Zadar, Split, Krk, Osor, Trogir, Ston and Dubrovnik, in which big number of original Roman population resided that was eventually Croaticized.

After the death of last ruler from the dynasty of Trpimirović in 1091 most of Croatian nobility has accepted the Hungarian king Coloman as a king of unified kingdom of Croatian and Hungary, stated by the deal Pacta Conventa from year 1102. As part of the Hungarian Kingdom, all art in Croatia already has all characteristics of Romanesque style.

=== Research ===
The cultural heritage of Croatia is researched for centuries, and was interpreted according several scholarly hypotheses:

- "Barbarian" thesis by Josef Strzygowski, arguing to be a product of "primitive creativity" of barbarians (in this case Slavs) after the downfall of the classical antiquity, who brought their wood construction building and adapted it to stone in littoral part of Croatia. However, it was based on several superficial and uncritical claims and analogies distant in both place and time (e.g. 17-18th century Scandinavia or 10th century Kashmir), and tendency to prove Germanic, and not Slavic origin of such prototypes in the "barbaric homeland". It projected racist ideologies of the early 20th century, according to which the Croats were culturally closer to the Germans than Italians.
- "Creative freedom in peripheral environments" thesis by Ljubo Karaman, arguing regional phenomenon of "small churches of free forms" by local craftsmen because in the territory of Croatia at the time was lack of authority from Rome and Constantinople. That there existed "border", "provincial" and "peripheral" environment. He also argued Lombardic origin of the Croatian interlace ornament. Karaman also "critically refuted all the thesis and hypotheses on explicit sources of the Dalmatian Pre-Romanesque: Byzantium, ancient Rome, Asia Minor and Perisa, but the most significant was his rebuttal of Strzygowski0s so-called 'Barbarian' thesis, and this rebuttal was so strong that these has been no attempt within the Croatian cultural circle since to revive it". However, he wasn't without criticism from Croatian nationalist circles because with such interpretation, from their viewpoint, refuted Croatian cultural reputation. Tomislav Marasović also showed that existed different types of form and grouped regionally.
- "Continuity" thesis by Ejnar Dyggve, arguing continuity of Antiquity and that the new Croatian population adopted building style from indigenous Roman population. However, his argumentation "equated two structurally different systems of articulating the walls", using a 4th century mausoleum of Anastasius the Fuller at Marusinac in Solin as a point of reference for all pre-Romanesque churches in Croatia. It was further developed by Milan Prelog with a concept of "active and passive negation of Classical Antiquity". Prelog also noted difference between urban and hinterland churches, with the latter of "an almost fortified type appear with a bell tower in the centre of the front facade".
- Ivo Petricioli differentiated the changes for example "churches with oval counterforts" since the 10th century, and that the Early/Pre-Romanesque term represents art, while Old-Croatian as cultural and historic concept. Stjepan Gunjača regarded Pre-Romanesque architecture in the Roman cities, while Old-Croatian in their hinterland.
- Mladen Pejaković argued a hypothesis that what often looks like a primitive and irregular building style, the architecture (and the ornaments) is actually aligned to geometric and astronomic measurements of the movement of the Sun, its light and in general time (as sacral gnomon).

== Architecture ==
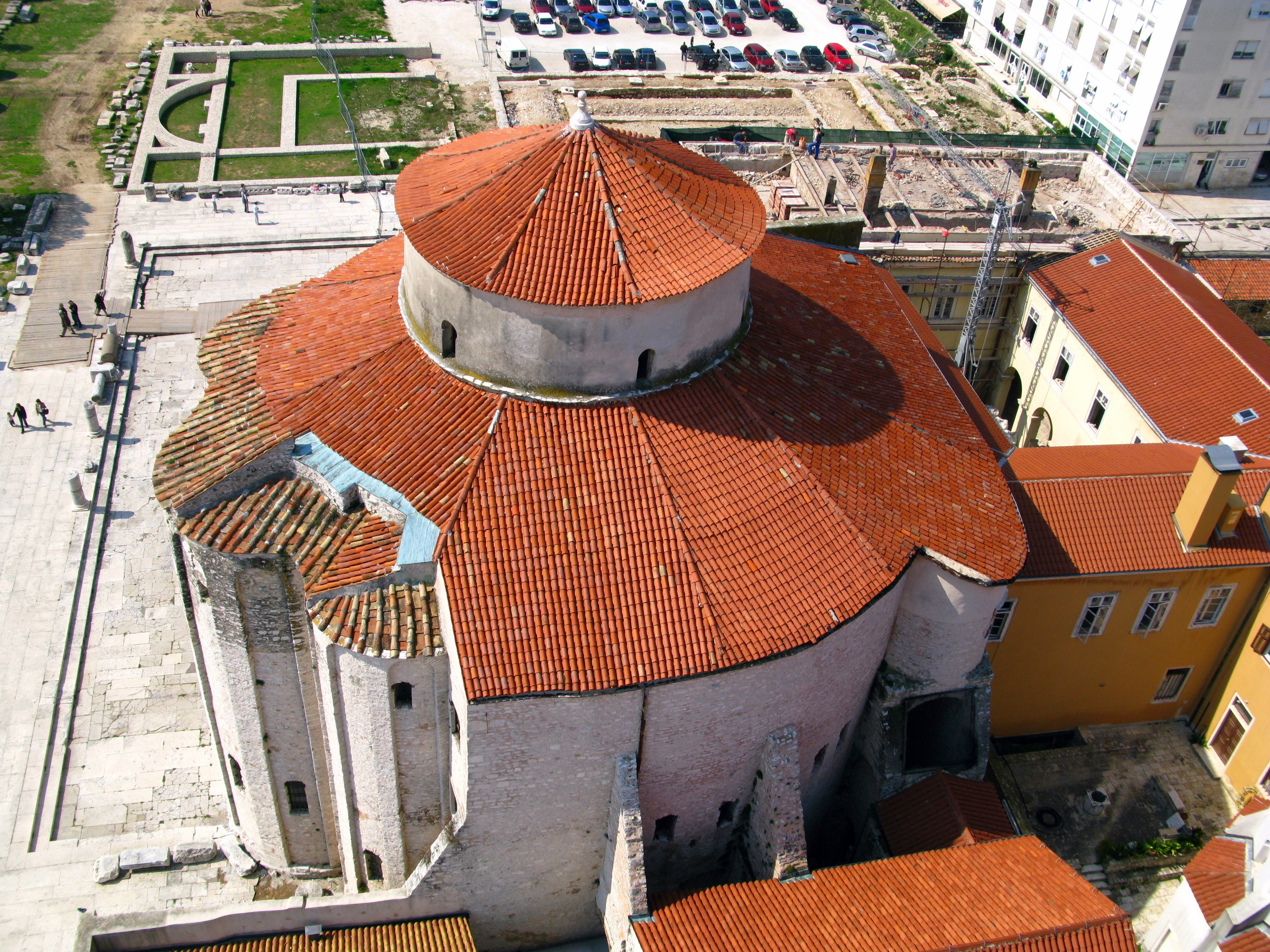
Church of St. Donatus from the 9th century in Zadar, showing a "centrally-planned divided space"-type of church.

During the 7th and 8th centuries there was a trend of constructing smaller buildings from the material and decorative elements of ruined older Roman buildings. During the 9th century, parallel with the establishment of Croatian principalities, new architecture of pre-Romanesque characteristics emerged. It was based on numerous influences of which the Frankish and Byzantine were the strongest.

The architectural heritage in Croatia includes "towns or settlements, residential architecture and ecclesiastical architecture". Slowly these inherited influences evolved into a more original style of architectural forms, including typologies (per 90 church monuments, Marasović 1978):

- Centrally-planned with single apse (4)
- Greek cross with four apses (4)
- Centrally-planned with six or eight apses (9)
- Centrally-planned divided space (1)
- Single nave undivied (9)
- Single nave with interiors divided (10)
- Single nave with exteriors divided (18)
- Single nave with three apses (2)
- Twin naves with two apses (3)
- Nave and two aisles with single apse (2)
- Nave and two aisles with three apses and external buttresses (3)
- Single nave with a dome (1)
- Nave and two aisles with three apses and presbytery (17)
- Nave and two aisles with transept and dome (5)
- Nave and two aisles with dome (2)

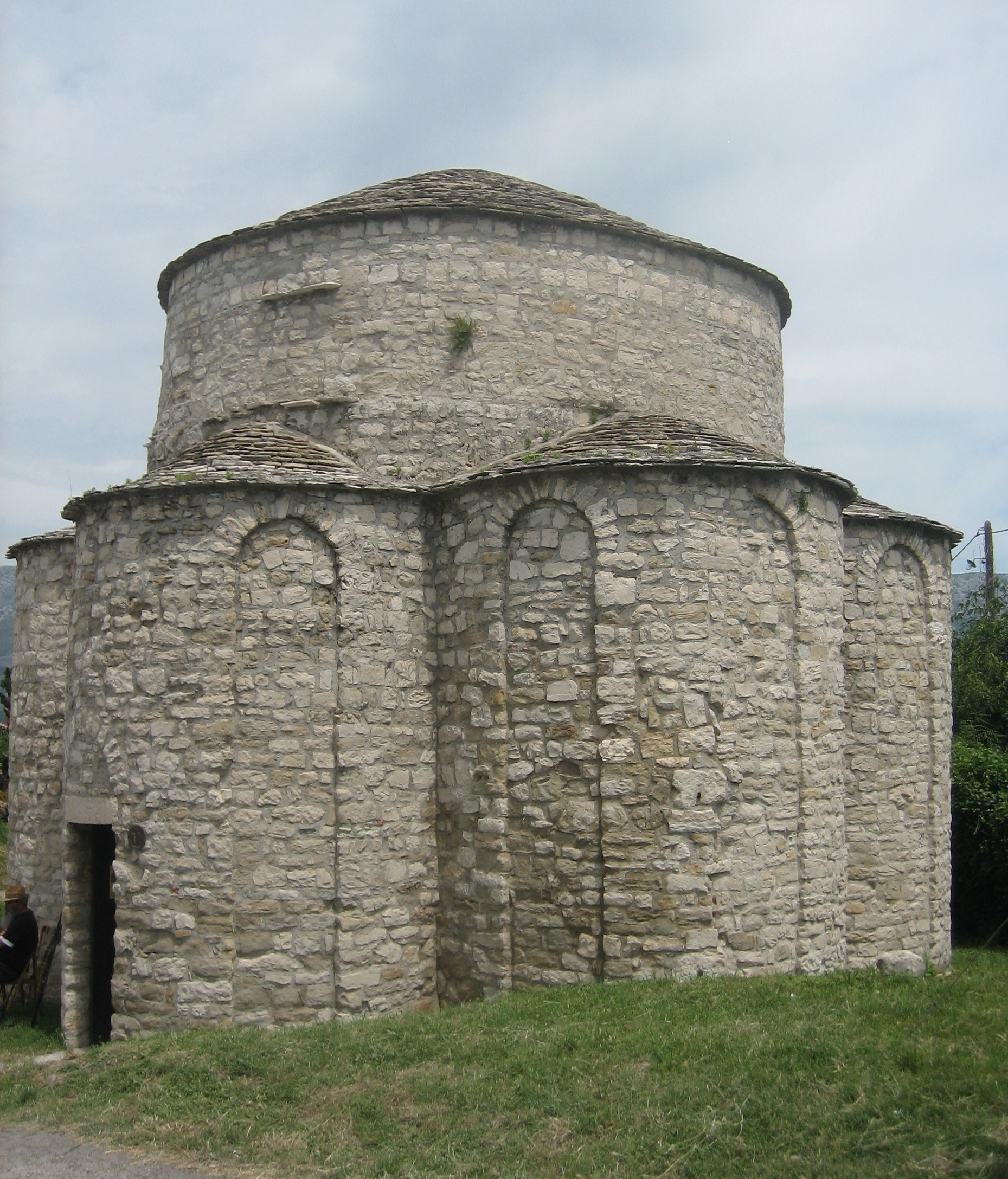
Church of Holy Trinity, Split (9th-11th century).

From this time, there are dozens of large churches, and over a hundred small ones preserved across the Croatian coastline and islands. They are all built out of roughly broken stones covered with thick layer of moulter inside and out, and with narrow decorative niches with arched top (like church of st. Peter in Priko near Omiš and St. Michael near Ston). Also, they often have stone vaults, apses and domes, as well as stone furniture (frames of doors and windows, perforated stone windows, and altar fences) columns, beams and portals. Instead of classical Roman forms where every part of the building was articulated and had its own recognizable form, new pre-Romanesque buildings have those parts united in unified mass. Therefore, the point where the wall turns to vault, or to drum of the dome is almost unnoticeable. Even though they were built roughly with unsophisticated materials they have excellent and often perfect understanding of architectural space.

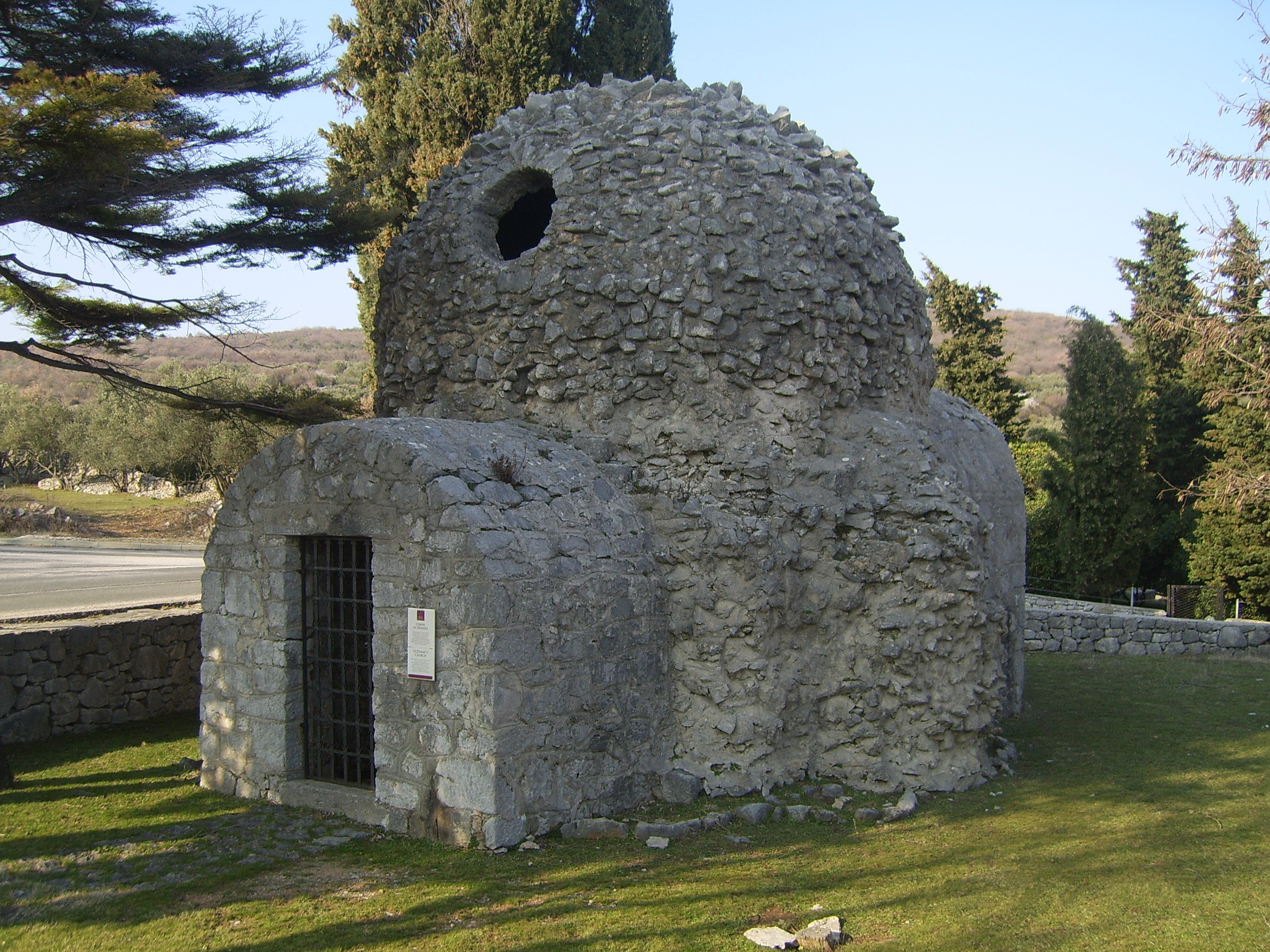
Church of St. Dunat on the island of Krk.

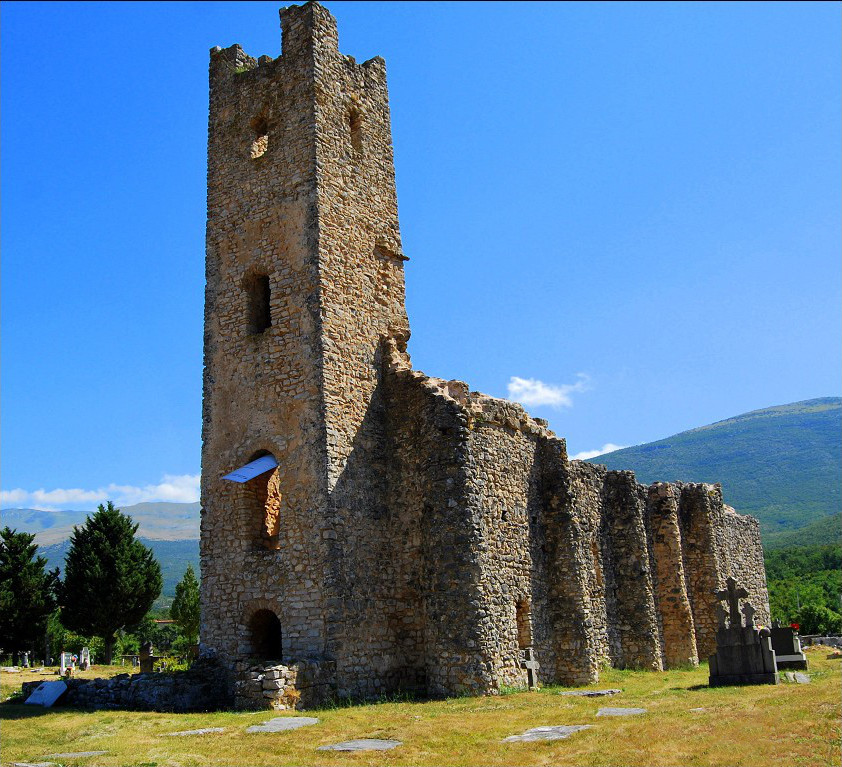
Church of Holy Salvation, Cetina with a Carolingian westwork from the late 9th century.

Smaller churches are called "churches of free shapes", as which the medieval architects wanted to explore all possibilities of shaping on the circular and rectangular base. Cube churches with dome are a bit simple (St. Pelegrin, Dugi otok), rectangular with elliptical base are a bit more complex (St. George, Ravanjska), as well as single nave churches with dome above middle section (St. Peter in Omiš) and cube based churches elongated with two apses (Church of St. Donatus on Krk) and the most complicated ones are those based on Greek cross with dome on the centre and large apse in eastern wing and two smaller apses in northern and southern wing (Church of Saint Cross in Nin).

The most original churches are churches based on a circle with multiple apses that are spread around in radial rhythm. Church of Holy Trinity, Split has radial 6 apses, while Church in Ošlje (Ston) is the ony one with 8 apses. The biggest church with circular base is Church of St. Donatus in Zadar from the 9th century. Around its circular base that has a dome there is a ring nave with gallery and three apses on the east. From that time in central Europe there is only Charlemagne's Palatine Chapel in Aachen that can be compared with its size and beauty.

In the 9th century were built Carolingian churches with a westwork and axial bell tower; Church of Holy Salvation, Cetina, church in Golubić and church at "Lopuška glavica" in Biskupija near Knin.

In the 10th century Croatian queen Jelena of Zadar, the wife of king Mihajlo Krešimir II, built in Solin two churches: Church of Saint Stephen at Otok which was used as a royal mausoleum, and Church of Our Lady at Otok, one of the biggest in Croatia which was used as crown basilica. Church of St. Stephen was built in Carolingian style with entrance hall above which was a gallery surrounded with two towers (westwork) from each sides of a narthex which led to tree nave church with two rows of pillars and a square apse at the end of central nave.

In the 11th century, next to older "Church on the Hill" in Solin, Crown church of St. Peter and Moses (better known as "Hollow Church") was built. The church was of unified Croatian pre-Romanesque forms and those Romanesque that appeared with the arrival of Benedictine monks in these parts. It has three naves, many thin niches inside and three apses of which middle is square and other are semicircular from inside and square outside. In this church the legate of Pope Gregory VII has crowned Croatian Demetrius Zvonimir.

In northern Croatia there are only few fragments of interlace found in Sisak, the capital of Ljudevit Posavski (9th century). When was founded Bishopric of Zagreb (1094), Croatian culture at the coast has already flourished for 300 years and Croatia was at the end of its independence.

== Sculpture ==
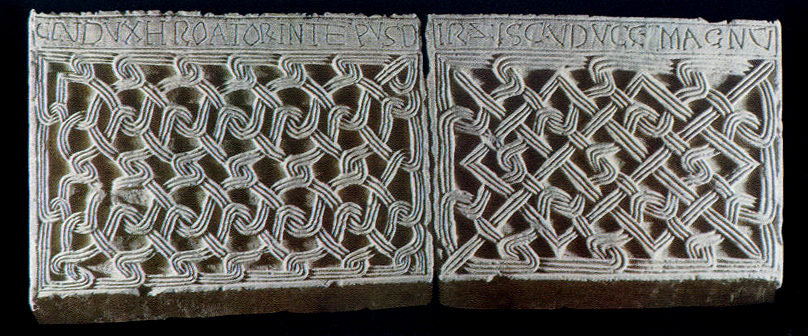
Croatian interlace with inscription of king Stjepan Držislav from the 10th century.

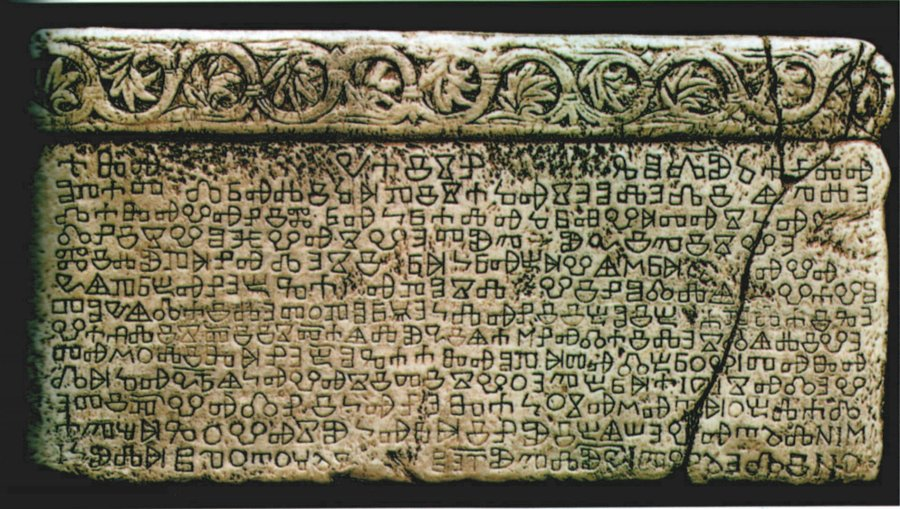
Baška tablet, the most famous glagolitic monument written with transversal type of glagolitic script from the 11th century.

Pre-Romanesque Croatian churches are also the most important historical sources of that time because on their beams and tympanums of altar fences, as well on some portals and ciboriums we found many names of Croatian kings, dukes and nobleman which are mentioned as patrons and builders of those churches. The oldest one is from church in Rižinice (Solin) which mentions Croatian duke Trpimir (PRO DVCE TREPIMERO), from around year 850, while on the inscription of duke Branimir from year 888 we have one of the oldest mention of Croats: CRVATORVM. On the rest from the 10th century we find the names of dukes Muncimir of Croatia, Stephen Držislav all the way to Demetrius Zvonimir from the end of the 11th century. That inscription of king Zvonimir is already made in Croatian, written in Glagolitic script (Baška tablet).

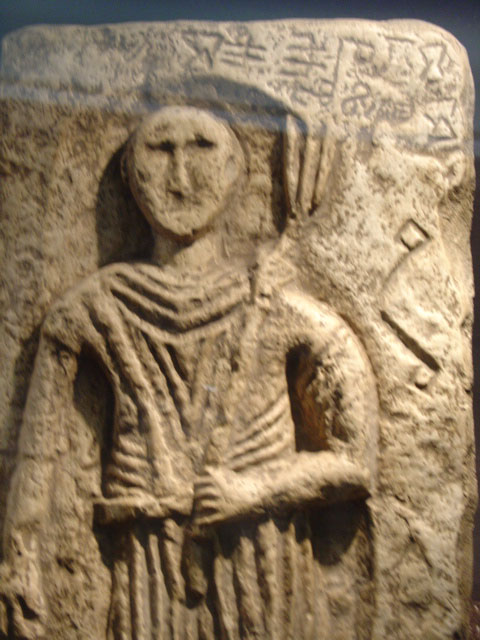
Plomin tablet from the 11th century.

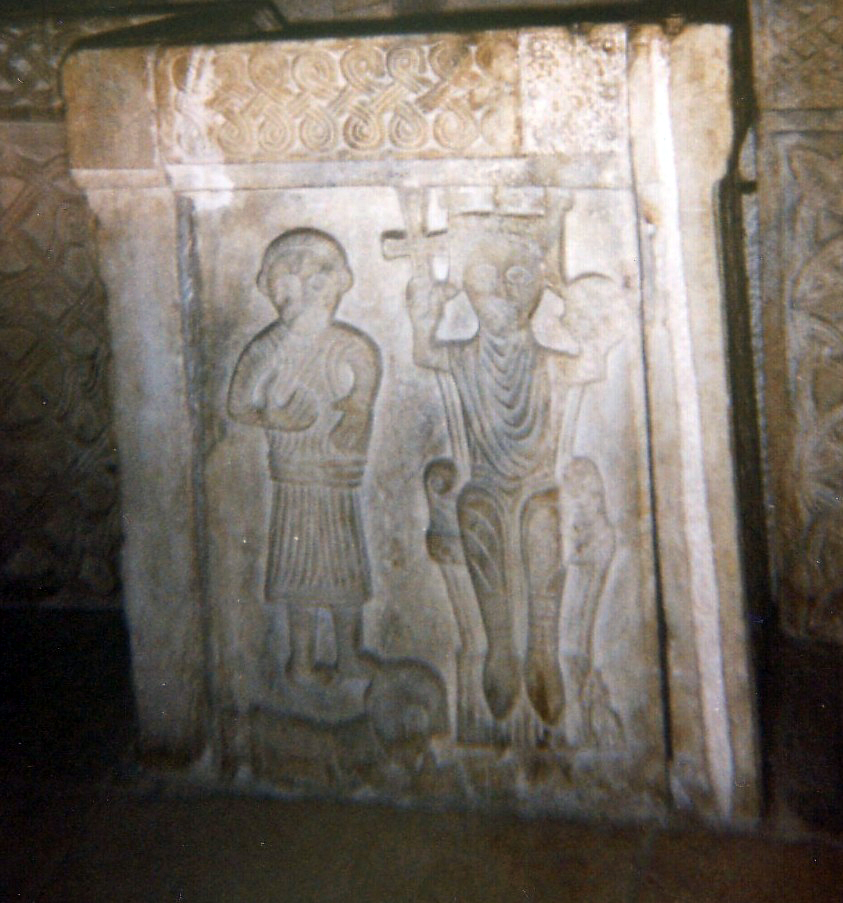
Monumental baptistery with figure of Croatian king from the 11th century, now in the Split Cathedral.

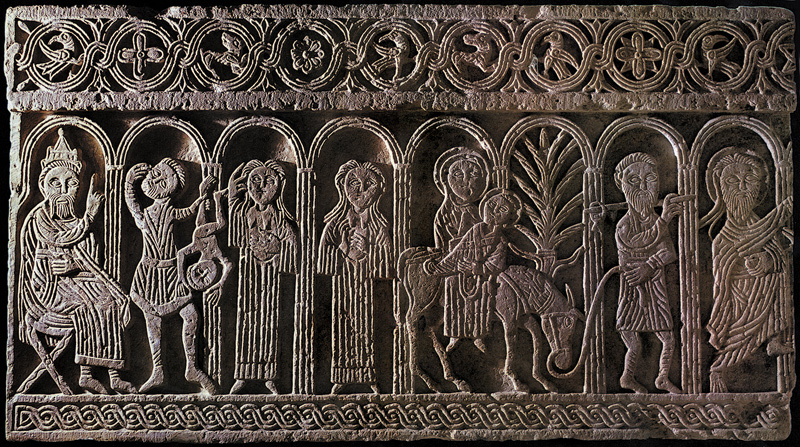
Monumental pluteus (98 x 183) from the church of St. Nediljica, mid-11th century, showing "Massacre of the Innocents", "Flight into Egypt", "Baptism".

Double literacy and two scripts have been noticed in several monuments as Plomin tablet (Istria) and Valun tablet (Cres, 11th century) where we have Latin and script as well as Croatian translation in Glagolitic script. Croats will use their native language and script all the way to the 16th century, especially in Istria, Kvarner and on the Croatian coast.

Altar fences and stone perforated windows were decorated with shallow interlace ornament which is called Croatian interlace. Motifs of this interlace are often of classical origin (waves, three string interlace, pentagrams, nets of rhomboids, etc.), but while in the Roman art it was used only as a frame, here they cover the entire surface. Sheer number, but also the quality of stonework, of these monuments show a rich masonry tradition of numerous masters and workshops on the east coast of Adriatic. Comparing to thousands of fragments found in Dalmatia, in the northern Croatia there are only two confirmed founds: one in Lobor and one in Ilok.

Sometimes the interlace is replaced with figures of Gospels, like the two 11th century monumental altar fences (98 x 235 cm and 98 x 183 cm) from destroyed basilica of St. Nediljica (Holy Sunday; later of John the Baptist) in Zadar, with figures flatten and their character lines reduced to graphic lines in outmost linear stylization. Similar is the relief from Hollow Church in Solin with the figure of (Croatian) king on the throne with western-type of crown, beside him is a page, and on the ground is a bowing subject. In the Church of St. Mary in Biskupija near Knin, the oldest figure of Holy Mary in Croatia was found, from the 11th century.

== Painting ==
Croatian interlace was originally polychromatically painted, usually every string would be coloured brightly in red or blue. Since the wall paintings that are mentioned in several literal sources (like the portraits of Trpimirović dynasty in church of St. George in Putalj above Kaštel Sućurac) are not preserved, they are only type of pre-Romanesque Croatian painting. There are preserved several frescoes in churches in Zadar (St. Chrysogonus, St. Mary, St. Peter the Elder), Ston (St. Michael), Šipan (St. John the Baptist), Istria (of St. Michael near Lim, St. Martin in Sveti Lovreč, St. Foška near Peroj, St. Jerome in Hum, St. Sophia in Dvigrad, St. Agatha near Kanfanar).

=== Manuscripts ===
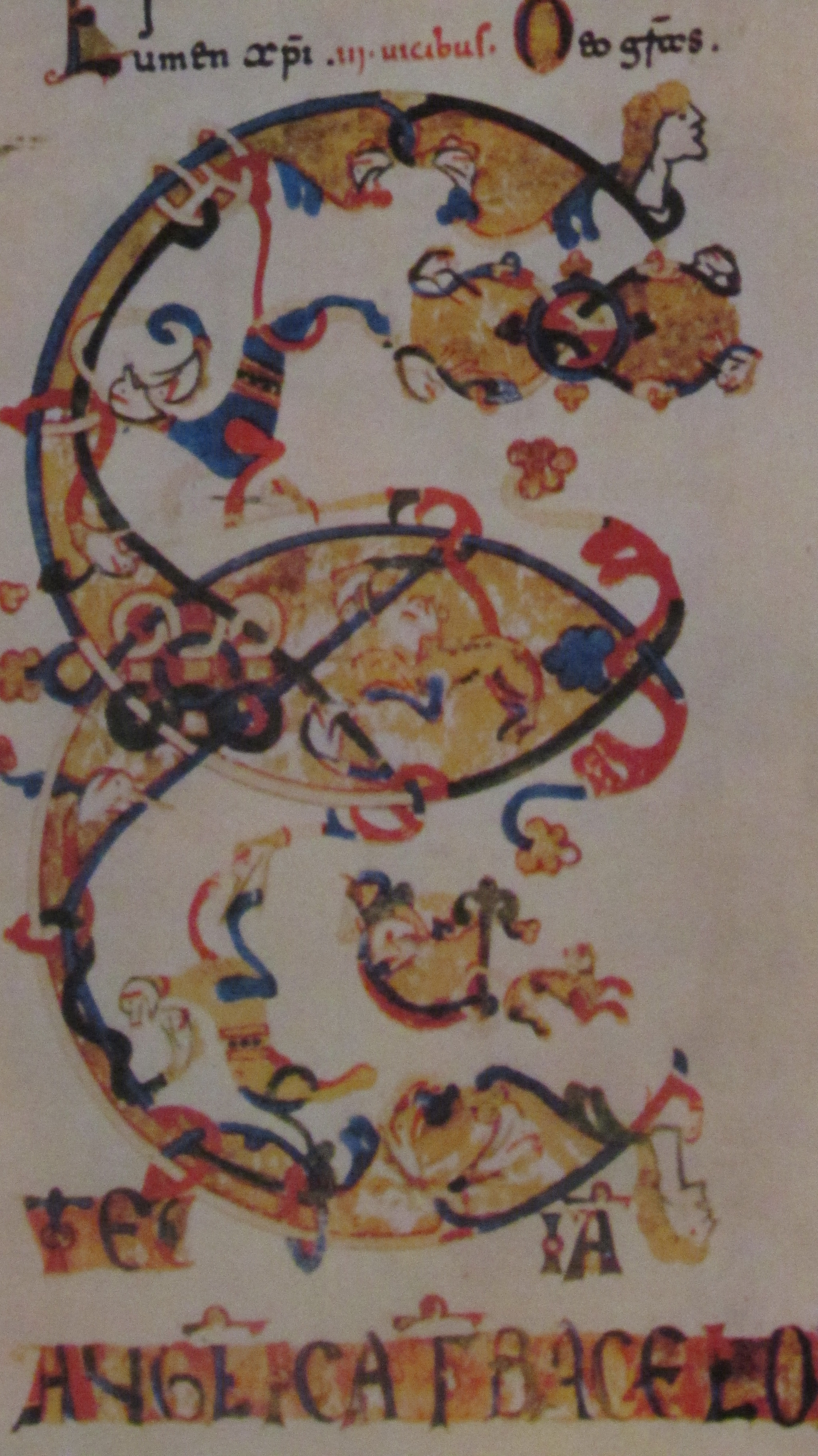
Abbess Vekenega's Evangeliary (1096) from the St. Mary's Church, Zadar.

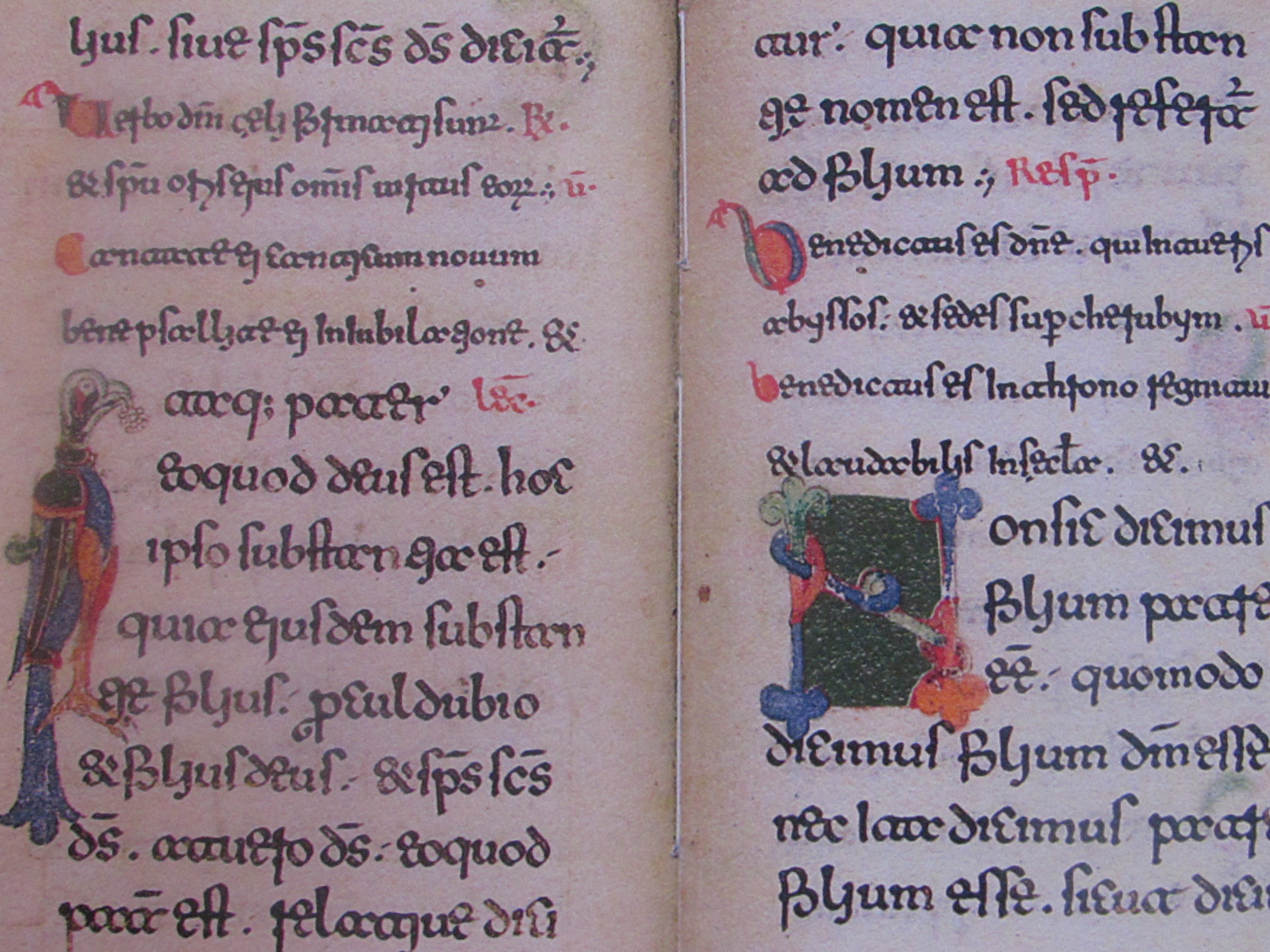
Abbess Čika's horologion (1066) from the St. Mary's Church, Zadar.

According to the historical documents, there existed many liturgical books which were produced in scriptoriums of monasteries on the Dalmatian coast. A number of church codices were preserved. They were done on pergam with pre-Romanesque miniatures of high quality and technique. The oldest one is Evangeliarium Spalatense that was written and painted roughly in the 8th century, based on famous Breviaries from pre-Carolingian era. The Rab Evangeliary and abbess Vekenega's Evangeliary (both now in Oxford) are "to be ranked with the very best of European manuscript art". In Zagreb there is a Liber psalmorum which was illuminated in Benedictine style by prior Maio for archbishop Paul of Split (c. 1015–1030), and introduced from France the Evangeliary MR 153. There's also abbess Čika's horologion (1066).

In Vatican there is a Osor Evangeliary, also in Monte Cassino Benedictine style (initials of intertwined leaves, interlace and animal heads. The same style of illumination we can found in Breviars in Trogir, Šibenik and Dubrovnik but there are many that were recorded (like 28 books in only one church in monastery of St. Peter in Selo in 1080 list) but not preserved. Aside the works in Carolingian minuscule and Beneventan script, the works in Glagolitic script includes Glagolita Clozianus, Mihanović and Gršković Fragments (all three with possible foreign original or territorial origin).

== See also ==
- Pre-Romanesque art and architecture
