= Church of the Holy Trinity, Split =

Coordinates: 43.5209°N 16.4358°E

Church of Holy Trinity
- Crkva sv. Trojstva
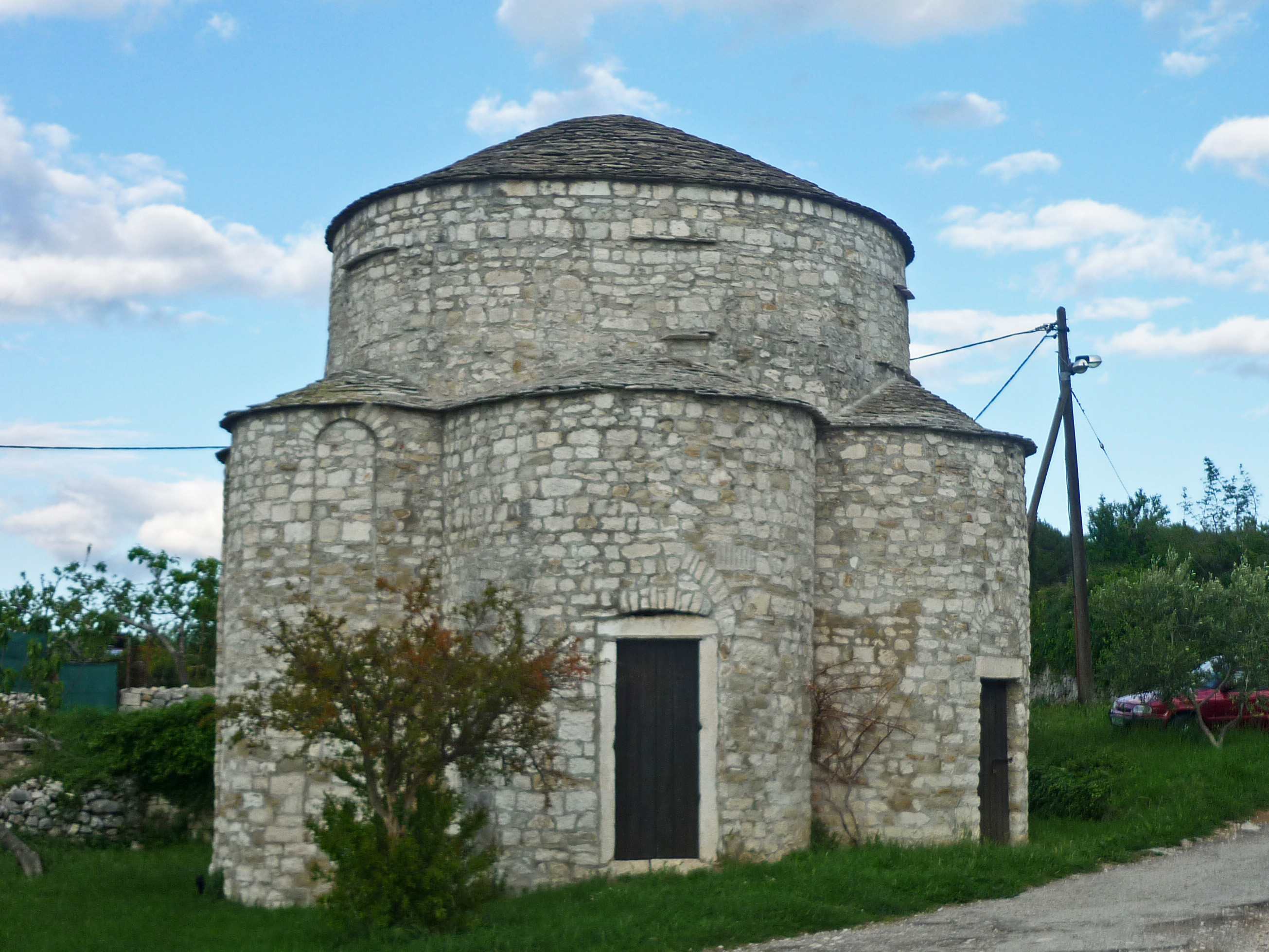
- Church of Holy Trinity
- Location: Split
- Country: Croatia
- Denomination: Roman Catholic

History
- Founded: 9th century

Architecture
- Style: Pre-Romanesque

Church of Holy Trinity (Croatian: Crkva sv. Trojstva) is a Pre-Romanesque style Roman Catholic church located in Split, Croatia. Out of all early-medieval (old Croatian) architectural monuments in Dalmatia, which historians date back to the period between 8th and 11th century, Church of Holy Trinity, with its original shape and rich findings, has a very important place. This small central edifice with six-leaf structure of semicircular arches strung around irregular circle has become one of the most precious heritage monuments of Split and Dalmatia.

Church of the Holy Trinity has been added to the register of the most valuable Croatian Cultural Heritage, of the highest category. The church is still in active use with Holy Mass being celebrated every Sunday at 8:30 am, except in the summertime (from June 13 to September 1).

== History ==
Although Iveković holds that the church was built in the 6th century and Ljubo Karaman in the 11th century, most historians believe that it was built in the 9th century. Church of Holy Trinity was first mentioned in a list of countries which had Benedictine monasteries from 1060.

English architect Thomas Graham Jackson, while studying the old architecture of Dalmatia, was first warned of the exceptional heritage value of this edifice, although it was founded abandoned and partially demolished in 1887. In 1891, investigations by domestic and foreign experts were conducted on the site. In 1914 a company from Bihać rented the church. In 1924, walls on the northwestern apse were renovated. During restoration works in 1948, the remains of an older edifice that extends to the east and more fragments of the altar partition were found. Previously walled-up windows were opened in the 1950s.

Today, findings are kept in the Archaeological Museum in Split. Arches and altar screen are a typical example of pre-Romanesque stone sculpture which is harmoniously decorated with the geometric Croatian interlace motifs and carved text.

After years of neglect, by 1965, the walls and vaults of the church were cracked, and thorns were growing in the interior. As a result, the head of a monastery of the Assumption of Mary from Poljud neighborhood in Split, fra Vjekoslav Bonifačić, asked the authorities to renovate the church, which they eventually did. On October 22, 1967, the church become the founding place of the new parish of the Holy Trinity. The nearby monastery of the Assumption of Mary is used as a parish church for practical reasons.

== Description ==
Church has a central shape which is dominated by a dome that lies on six apses interconnected with pillars. The church is only of all six-apse edifices in the early medieval architecture of Dalmatia that is located in Split (the others are in the Zadar area). In addition, it's also the best preserved. The maximum external length of the church is 10.30 meters, a minimum internal length 5.90 meters, while the height of the central tambour is 9.5 meters. The church is built of limestone drowned in plaster and vaulted with a semi-dome, probably taken from some older buildings in the area.

Remains of an ancient edifice with an apse that had an unknown purpose were found nearby.
