= Plomin (disambiguation) =

Plomin may refer to:

- Plomin, a town in Croatia
- Plomin Power Station, a power station near Plomin, Croatia
- Plomin tablet, a Croatian Glagolitic inscription at the outer wall of the church of Saint George in Plomin, Croatia
- Robert Plomin, an American psychologist
