= Madi family =

Croatian noble family

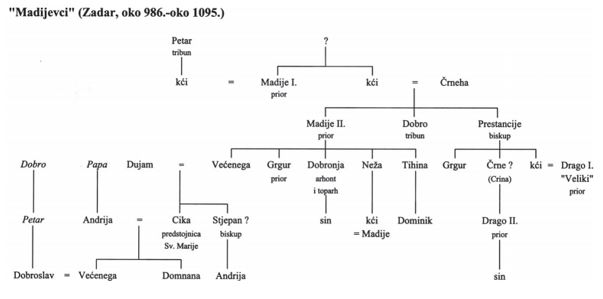
Madi family tree

The Madi family (Croatian: Madijevci) was a patrician family from Zadar. They were influential in Croatian politics from the 10th to 12th centuries.

== Notable members ==
- Madius or Madije, the first known member, prior of Zadar and the proconsul of Dalmatia, rebuilt the monastery of St. Krševan in 986. The only prior of Zadar before the Madi was Andrija, the founder of the St. Krševan Monastery, who died in 918.
- Jelena, Croatian queen, wife of king Michael Krešimir II of Croatia, died in 976.
- Grgur or Dobronja, prior of Zadar, died in 1035. Tried to make Dalmatian city-states independent from Byzantine Empire.
- Čika and her daughter Domnana, the founders the Benedictine monastery of St. Maria in Zadar in 1066 which received privileges from the Croatian king Peter Krešimir IV.
- Vekenega, the daughter of Čika, became a nun in 1072 and later the abbess of the convent.

== Sources ==
- Nikolić, Zrinka (2005). "Madijevci: primjer obitelji dalmatinske gradske elite u desetom i jedanaestom stoljeću" [The Madii: an Example of the Family of the Dalmatian Urban Elite in the Tenth and Eleventh Centuries]. Papers and Proceedings of the Department of Historical Research of the Institute of Historical and Social Research of Croatian Academy of Sciences and Arts (in Croatian). Croatian Academy of Sciences and Arts.
- Jakić-Cestarić, Vesna (1995). "Antroponomastički pristup ispravi o darovanju dijela soli i ribolova na o. Vrgadi samostavu sv. Krševana god. 1095. i o darovanju zemlje "in Tochinia" samostanu sv. Marije god. 1066./67". Radovi/Institute for Historical Sciences of the Croatian Academy of Sciences and Arts in Zadar (in Croatian) (37). Croatian Academy of Sciences and Arts. ISSN 1330-0474.
