= St. Mary's Church, Zadar =

Coordinates: 44.1152°N 15.2248°E

Church of St. Mary
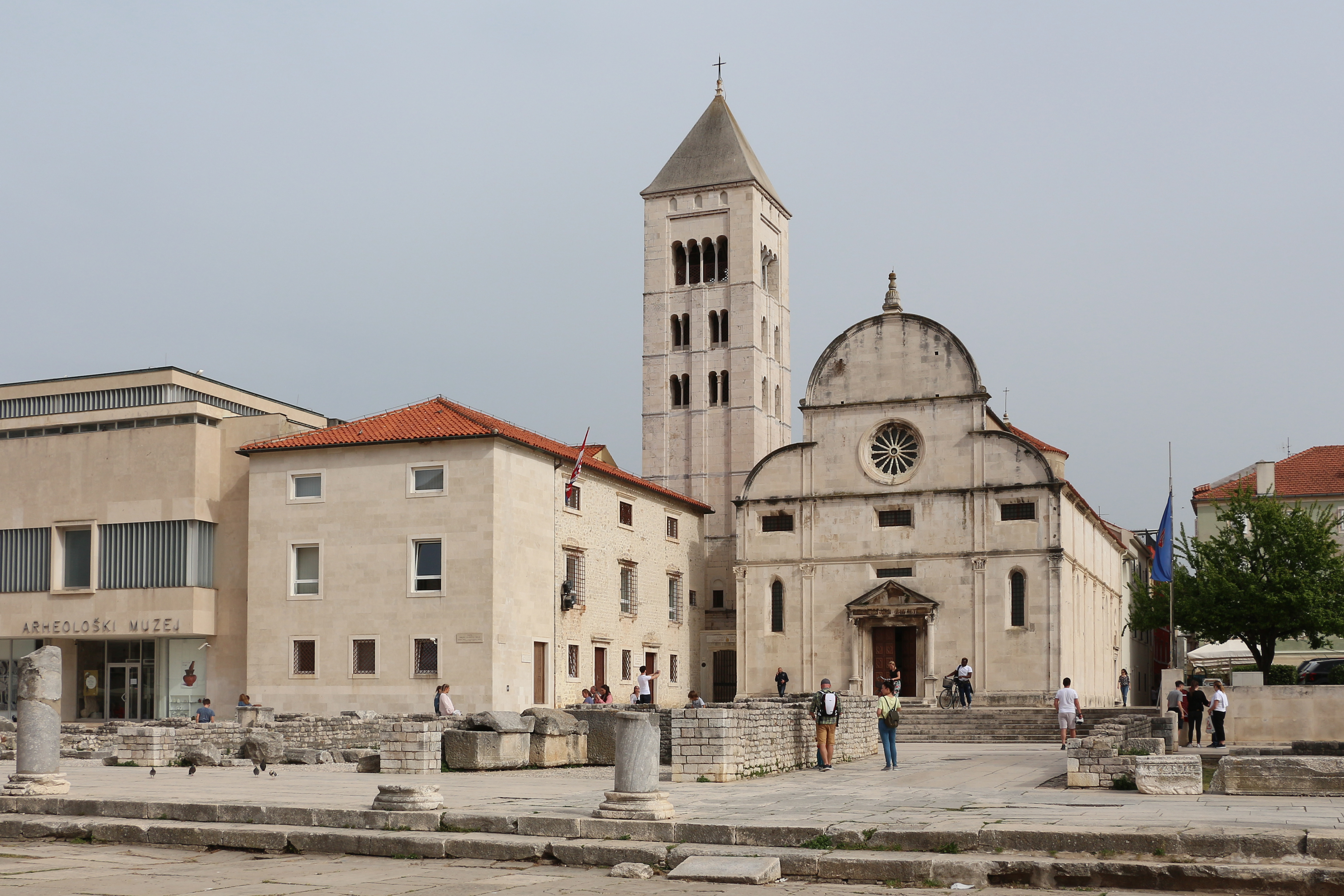

Religion
- Affiliation: Catholic

Location
- Location: Zadar, Croatia
- Interactive map of Church of St. Mary

Architecture
- Founder: Čika
- Completed: 1066 AD

Church of St. Mary is a Benedictine monastery located in Zadar, Croatia. It was founded in 1066 on the eastern side of the town's old Roman Forum.

== History ==
The Benedictine monastery was founded beside an existing church in 1066 by the Zadar noblewoman Čika. The monastery subsequently received royal protection and grants by king Petar Krešimir IV. After becoming a nun later in life, Čika endowed the monastery with two hymnariums and a prayer book, along with other valuable items. Both hymnariums are lost, but the prayer book survived, and is currently kept in the Bodleian Library in Oxford.

Čika's daughter Vekenega entered the monastery as a nun in about 1072, after the death of her husband Dobroslav. Vekenega, as the first successor of Čika, sought financial aid from the new king Coloman of Hungary to finish the monastery, and to erect new monastery objects. The monumental tower bears Coloman's name and the year 1105. The tower bears the inscription which commemorates the king's entrance to Zadar in 1102. The chapel of the tower also features the remains of 12th century frescoes. The church bears her tomb, which are decorated by Latin verses.

In 1507, a new Renaissance style portal and a southern facade were added by the Korčula-born builder and stone worker Nikola Španić. In 1744 baroque motifs were added to the interior decorations.

During World War II, when the city was a part of Italy, the church and the surroundings were destroyed by Allied bombing. The church was rebuilt after the war.

== See also ==
- Architecture of Croatia
- Church of St. Donatus
