= Evangeliarium Spalatense =

Evangeliarium Spalatense is a manuscript of the New Testament in Latin from the 8th century. The manuscript has not survived in complete condition.

== Description ==
The manuscript contains the text of the four Gospels on 309 parchment leaves (32 cm × 24.2 cm (12.6 in × 9.5 in)), with lacuna at the end. The last 12 leaves were lost. The text is written in two columns and 43 lines per pagina, in half uncial letters.

Palaeographers are not in agreement as to the dating of this manuscript (6-8th century). It is not certain where the manuscript was written. Both Split and Italy have been suggested by scholars as the place of its origin. It any way it is the oldest manuscript of Latin Vulgate found in Dalmatia.

It was found in Cathedral of Saint Domnius in 1890. It is housed in Split. In 2004 was published its facsimile.
