= Plomin tablet =

11th-century Glagolitic inscription in Croatia

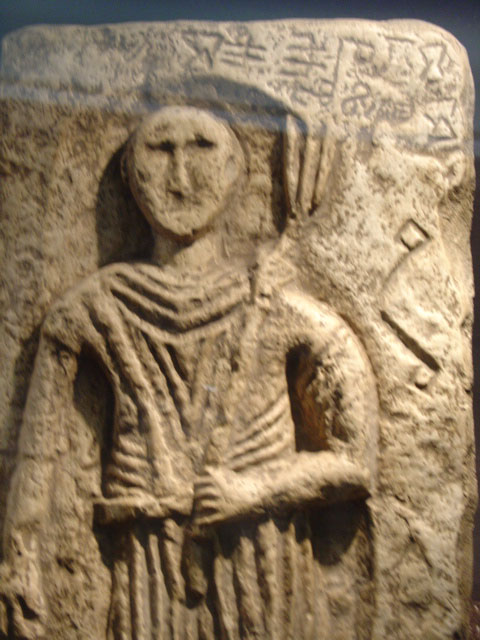
The Plomin tablet.

Plomin tablet (Croatian: Plominski natpis) is a Glagolitic inscription in Croatian at the outer wall of the church of Saint George in Plomin, Croatia. Roman god of flora and fauna Silvanus is portrayed. This inscription bears witness of early parallelism of two cultural currents on Istrian territory: Romance symbol is an Antique relief, and Slavic, i.e. Croatian symbol is the Croatian language and Glagolitic script.

== Reading of the text ==
Above the male figure a two-lined Glagolitic text is inscribed while on the right of the figure another symbol is carved whose meaning is not definitely ascertained. Reading of the text is fairly straightforward: the first line says SE EPIS, and the second line ЪLЪS. The sign whose function is questioned by Fučić has been inscribed with significantly deeper furrows and is four times larger than the average size of Glagolitic letters, and for that reason alone one can ask whether it's an indispensable ingredient of the Glagolitic inscription itself, has it been written by the hand of the same scribe and has it been inscribed at the same times as other text. A Glagolitic letter cannot be discerned from it for certainty.

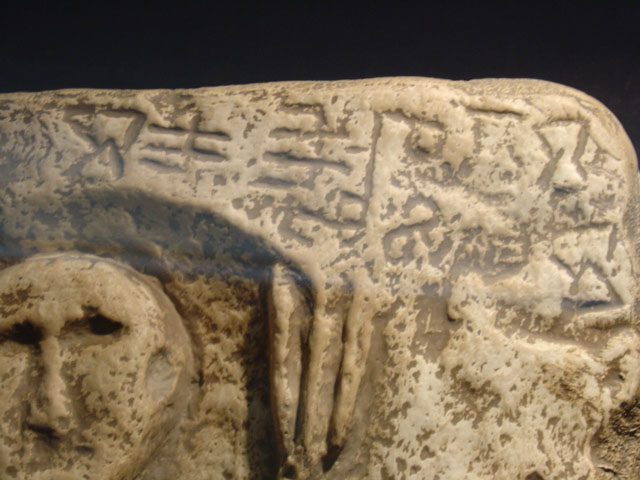
Glagolitic inscription on the Plomin tablet.

Trying to read both of the lines continuously: SE E PISЪLЪ S.., i.e. this was written S..., the sentence remains unfinished. Whether the text was written by somebody whose name starts with S or somebody wrote something that starts with S is not known. Since Old Croatian verb pisati meant both "to write" and "to paint", it is uncertain whether this verb was used to denote also a sculptural work and concordantly, if Plomin tablet inscription is a signature of the sculptor, or the Glagolitic text some secondarily written graffiti, written by some scribe.

Reading of the text introduces some additional phonetic and orthographic difficulties — an unusual orthography appears for writing the participle pisalъ, where on the position of sound /a/ a semivowel 'ъ' is written (thus pisъlъ instead of pisalъ). Fučić argues whether it is phonetically possible for the author of this inscription to have mistaken the phonetic value of a semivowel with that of the full vowel /a/, i.e. that he might have replaced the signs due to the similarity of pronunciation.

== Paleographic analysis ==
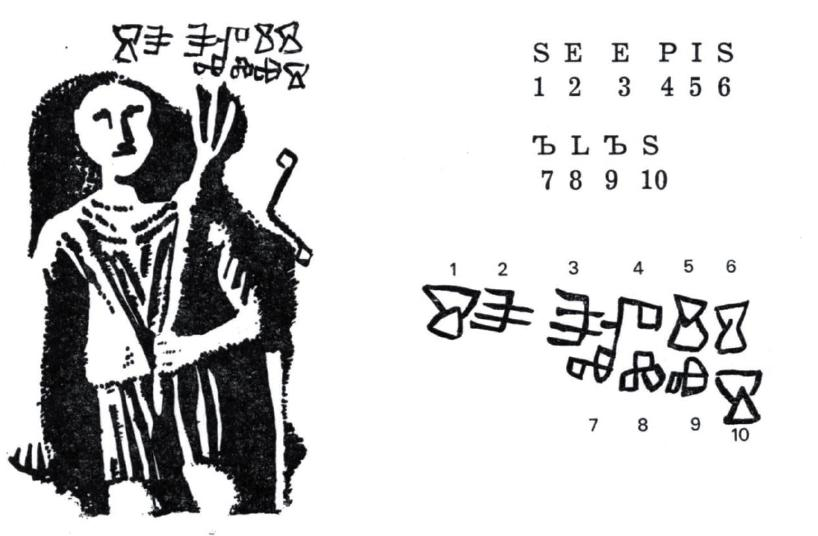
Textual reconstruction of the Plomin tablet.

General paleographic analysis shows that the rounded Glagolitic is still used, preceding the development of Croatian angular Glagolitic, which dates the monument before the 12-13th century.

An analysis of individual graphemes also points to this timeframe: There's the letter S (1, 6, 10) which still has triangular lower element and the letter I (5) which still has triangular upper element, i.e. which has not reduced the ductus the way it can be observed on Vienna Folios. There is also an older type of the letter P (4) with lateral dash. Sign for the semivowel (7, 9) on Plomin tablet is not found on Glagolitic monuments before the 11th century or after the 13th century. Finally, there is a peculiar letter E (2, 3) occurring twice in this inscription and in both attestations demonstrates the same type with two horizontal lines intersecting the vertical hasta. Taking into account the paleographic development of that letter, it can be ascertained that E originally appears with two horizontal lines, which are subsequently reduced to one, which is subsequently reduced to a dot, which is itself finally elided. With the letter E on the Plomin tablet, this development on Croatian Glagolitic areal can be connected with oldest preserved Glagolitic monuments at all: the Kiev Folios, Prague Fragments, and with Macedonian monuments: Codex Assemanius, Ohrid Folios, Euchologium Sinaiticum.

All these traits indicate a great antiquity of the monument, which date the Plomin tablet to the 11th century. Perhaps, moreover, a lower limit can be posited in the 10th century, which is a dating held by scientists such as Marija Čunić.

== The relief ==
The relief shows a beardless male figure, clad in short tunic by his knees, tightened at the hips. Costume is Antique, Roman. This was the clothes of slaves, laborers and peasants. Frontal setting of the character with his left arm bended at the elbow in front of the chest, holding some kind of an object, reminding of the pose and the typical gesture of male portraits of Late Antique Roman gravestones stelae, makes the connection of continuity or imitation of this primitive relief to the Late Antique gravestone plastics unambiguous. Although the niche around the figure has been inscribed uncertainly and inconsistently, it points to the impostation of the figure in its own space, typical of plastics of Roman gravestone monuments. General naturalistic tendency also points to Antique as a starting point, which is manifested through the impotence of the artist's expression, especially in the details—the "scully" type of beardless head and the rudiments of the ear shell and barely marked hair.

== Dating and interpretation ==
If the Glagolitic inscription is dated to the 11th century, than that date is terminus post quem non for the genesis of the relief, i.e. its upper bound. Lower bound is the Late Antique. Between that large range—from Late Antique to Early Romanesque—it is less probable that this work would have come into existence in the centuries from the 8th to the first half of the 11th century, because in that period the sculptural works used wattle ornaments, a stylistically marked type of creation, a tradition which rules out naturalistic conceptions of human figure.

Following this line of thought, Branko Fučić has in 1953, publishing Plomin tablet for the first time, formed an alternative theory according to which the relief

...should be looked upon as a primitive provincial work of Late Antique (either pagan or Christian), or as an early Romanesque work, which after the period of wattle ornamentation reintroduces human figure into sculptural works. At any case, the connections of monument with the Late Antique plastics are beyond any doubt. They represent either the very much alive Antique tradition, or the imitation of the medieval carver of some Antique template.

Reflecting on Fučić's alternative interpretation, academician Ljubo Karaman has laid his arguments, deciding for a medieval origin of the relief.

Following Karaman's arguments and his own later iconographic studies, Fučić has voiced an opinion that this figure represents Saint George—a saint to whom Plomin church is dedicated to. This conclusion was induced by the attribute the Plomin tablet figure hold in his hand. Fučić was unable to identify the object in the (back then) available repertoire of Roman plastics attributes that would match with the attribute of Plomin tablet figure. These were not fork or a fish gig but a three-leaved branch, a symbol of vegetation; it must have been an abbreviation for the conception of vegetation.

Christian iconography can interpret that attribute by a palm branch—of course, in a stylised, non-naturalistic form—and palm is a symbol of martyrs. Saint George only in the time of Crusades has become an idolized knight, horse-rider, dragon-slayer. In older Christian iconography he is but a messenger of faith and a martyr, and hence the martyr palm would suffice as an adequate attribute. By comparing the Plomin tablet figure with the remains of fresco from the ruinous church of Saint George near Vrbnik on the island of Krk, where this saint is portrayed not with one vegetational attribute but with two (holding one in each hand), Fučić has interpreted this unusual, exceptional iconography as a contamination of the perception of Saint George the martyr (holding a palm in his hand) with a perception of Croatian folk "green George" (Croatian: zeleni Juraj) which carries spring greenery in his hand.

In his later work, Fučić concludes that he was a secondary path to a proper solution. Later he summarily describes the problem and solutions as follows:

1. Neither in the East nor in the West is there any extant artwork of Saint George before the 10th century.
2. If a carver from the 11th century (to which the Glagolitic inscription is dated) had in mind to display Saint George, it is beyond any doubt that he would have carved the essential saintly attribute, the aureola, which is absent from this monument.
3. The relief is — concordantly — older. Fučić argues for his initial dating to the Late Antique period.
4. Another interpretation becomes apparent, where the Plomin tablet figures represents ancient, antique "green George", a pagan Silvanus with vegetational attribute in hand, as can be seen in a similar iconography on one antique Istrian relief in the Buzet museum.

Glagolitic inscription is, therefore, secondary; it's graffiti. The fact that the relief was embedded in a church wall was conditioned by a subsequent folk reinterpretation, which in the imagery of Silvanus saw a portrait of Saint George, though probably still contaminated with the earlier conception of "green George".
