= Čika =

Croatian benedictine nun

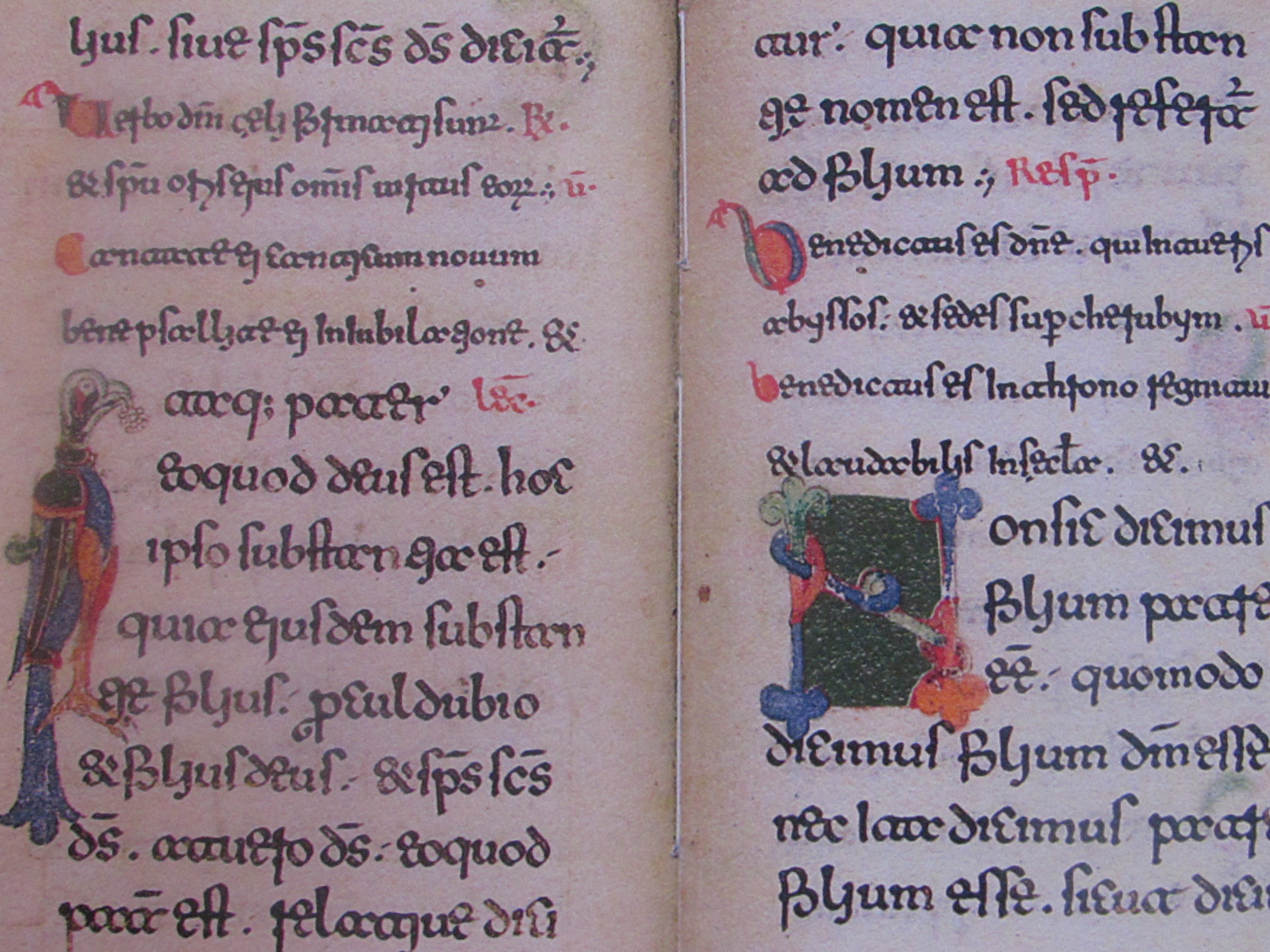
Čika's Prayer Book from 1066

Čika (Zadar, first half of 11th century – Zadar, after 1095; Latin: Chicca) was a Croatian benedictine nun, founder of the benedictine monastery of St. Mary Church in Zadar. She is also known for the illuminated prayer book known as Čika's book of hours, the oldest prayer book for personal use in Europe.

== Life ==
She was the daughter of Dujam and Vekenega, niece of prior Madi, and the wife of Andrija.

She was the member of the noble patrician Madi family. After the death of her husband in 1066, she founded the monastery of St. Mary in Zadar with the help of her family. King Petar Krešimir IV referred to her as his sister when he placed the monastery under the royal protection, though such genealogy is debated.

She was the mother of Vekenega. who followed her as abbess of the monastery of St. Maria in Zadar from 1072 and who commissioned a richly illuminated evangelistary from the scriptorium of the monastery of St. Krševan in 1096.

== Sources ==
- Švab, Mladen (1989), "CIKA (Cica, Cicca, Ciccha, Cicka, Cicna, Cika, Čika)", Croatian Biographical Lexicon (in Croatian), LZMK
