= Vekenega =

Croatian Benedictine nun (died 1111)

Vekenega (Zadar - Zadar, September 27, 1111) was a Croatian Benedictine nun from the House of Madi, a noble family from Zadar. She was the daughter of Čika and took over from her mother as abbess of the Benedictine monastery of St. Maria in Zadar some time after entering the order in 1072. Vekenaga is also known for the richly illuminated evangelistary which she commissioned from the scriptorium of the monastery of St. Krševan in Zadar in 1096.

== Life ==
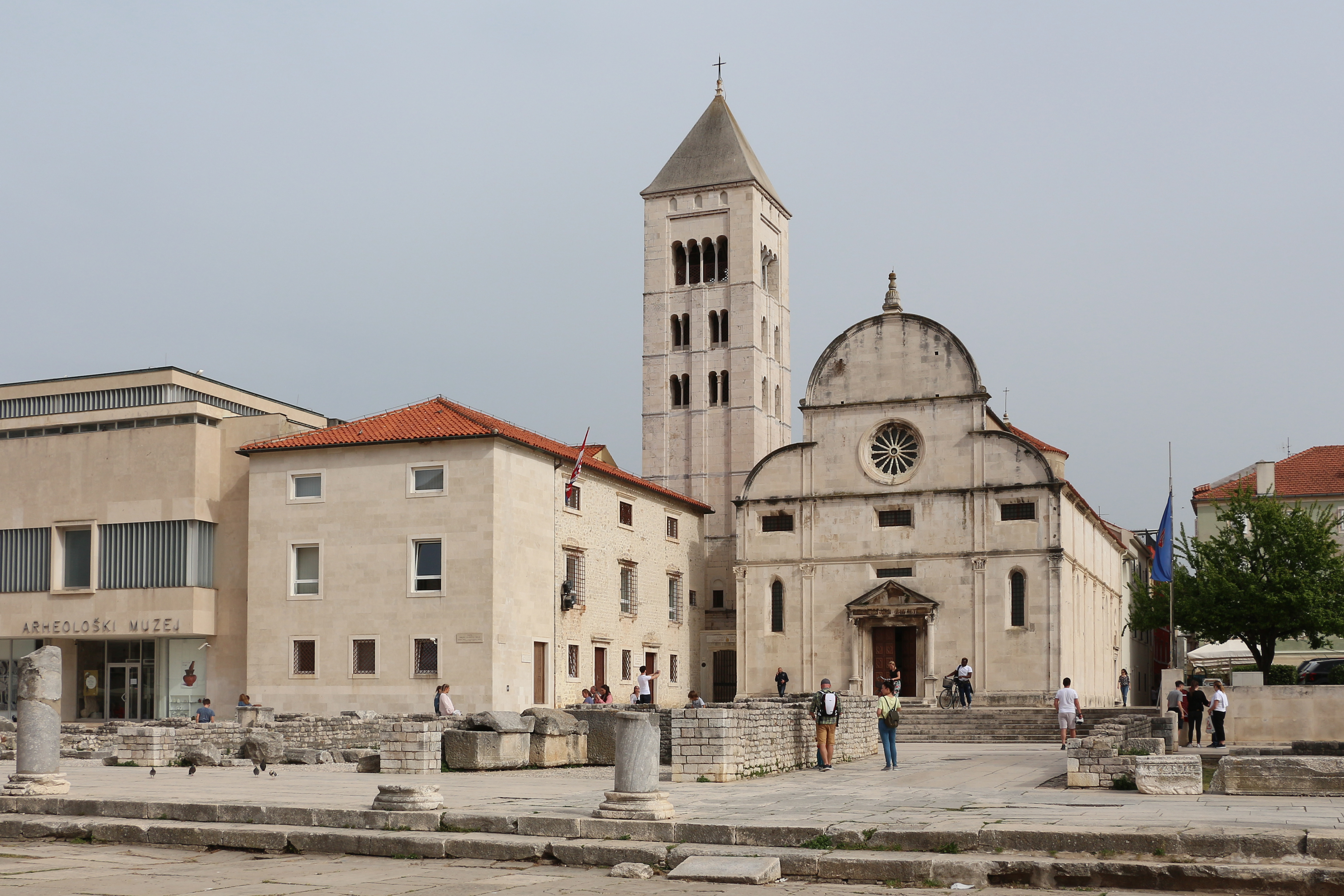
Church of St. Mary in Zadar in 2019

Vekenega was the daughter of Čika, a member of the noble patrician Madi family and Andrija. She had a sister, Domnana. She was the maternal granddaughter of Dujam and Vekenega, after whom she was named. A maternal ancestor was Prior Madi. Her mother Čika (d. after 1095) is known to have founded the Benedictine monastery of St. Mary in Zadar in 1066 after she was widowed. Vekenega was married to Dobroslav.

Čika founded and entered the Benedictine monastery of St. Maria in Zada and became its abbess. When the king Petar Krešimir IV placed the monastery under the royal protection, he referred to Čika as his sister.

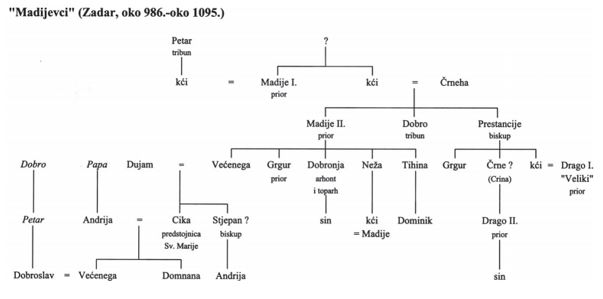
Family tree of Madii family, Zadar, 11. century

After the tragic death of her husband, Dobroslav, Vekenega became a nun in 1072, and entered the monastery of St. Mary. At some point after 1095, Vekenega replaced her mother as abbess.

In 1097, Coloman, King of Hungary invaded Croatia, defeated its last native king Petar Snačić, and was eventually crowned king of Croatia in 1102. Vekenega sought the support and financial assistance of Coloman to help complete building the monastery of St. Maria and tactfully stated that he had restored the "peace of the land and the sea". The monastery's Romanesque bell tower still has an inscription of Coloman's name and the year 1105, commemorating the king's entrance into Zadar following his siege of the city. His patronage enabled Vekenega to complete building the three-aisled basilica and new monastic buildings, including the assembly hall, considered one of the most important Romanesque buildings in Croatia.

Vekenega died on 27 September 1111 and was buried at the monastery. Her tomb was decorated with Latin verses.

== The Vekenega Evangelistary ==
In 1095 or 1096, the Evangelistary of Zadar, also known as the Vekenega Evangelistary, was created at the request of Vekenega. The 285 × 190 mm book was scribed in the Beneventan script, imported to what was then Dalmatia from Italy. The book is now housed in the Bodleian Library in Oxford, having been purchased by the institution in 1817, after having passed through the hands of Matteo Luigi Canonici and Giuseppe Canonici in the late eighteenth and early nineteenth century. It is now known as MS. Canon. Bibl. Lat. 61. It was digitised in 2018 and is viewable online. Vekenega is referred to though the Bodleian records as abbess Uekanega.

In 1996 the Vekenega Evangelistary was celebrated on a stamp issued by the newly independent Republic of Croatia to celebrate the 900th anniversary of its creation.
