= Croatian interlace =

Decorative knot

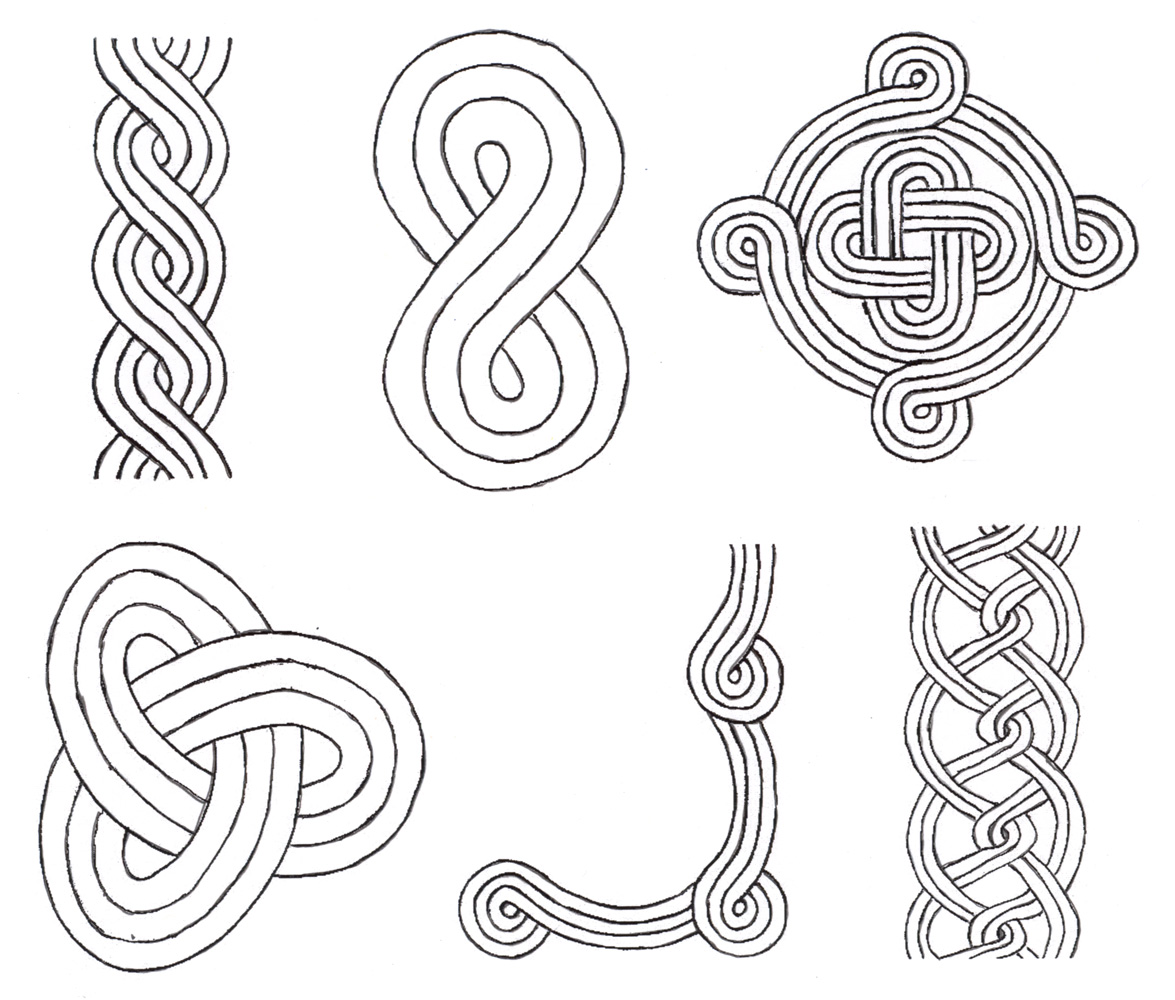
Croatian interlace

The Croatian interlace or Croatian wattle, known as the pleter or troplet in Croatian, is a type of interlace, most characteristic for its three-ribbon pattern. It is one of the most often used patterns of Croatian pre-Romanesque art and architecture.

== Overview ==
It is found on and within churches as well as monasteries built in early medieval Duchy of Croatia and Kingdom of Croatia between the 9th and beginning of the 12th century, with examples counting in "hundreds", making Croatia country with highest concentration of interlace in general in Europe.

The interlaces in Croatia are dominated by double and triple ribbons. The ornamental strings were sometimes grouped together with animal and herbal figures. Most representative examples of inscriptions embellished with the interlace include the Baška tablet, Baptismal font of Prince Višeslav and the Branimir Inscription. Other notable examples are located near Knin, in Ždrapanj and Žavić by the Bribir settlement, Rižinice near Solin and in Split and Zadar.

== Origin ==
There is a scholarly debate about the origin and identity of the regional three-ribbon interlace, some considering it as Croatian "national expression", other arguing Lombardic influence (introduced by the Patriarchate of Aquileia), but such exclusive models are problematic.

== Modern ==
Croatia has a civil and military decoration called the Order of the Croatian Interlace.

== Gallery ==
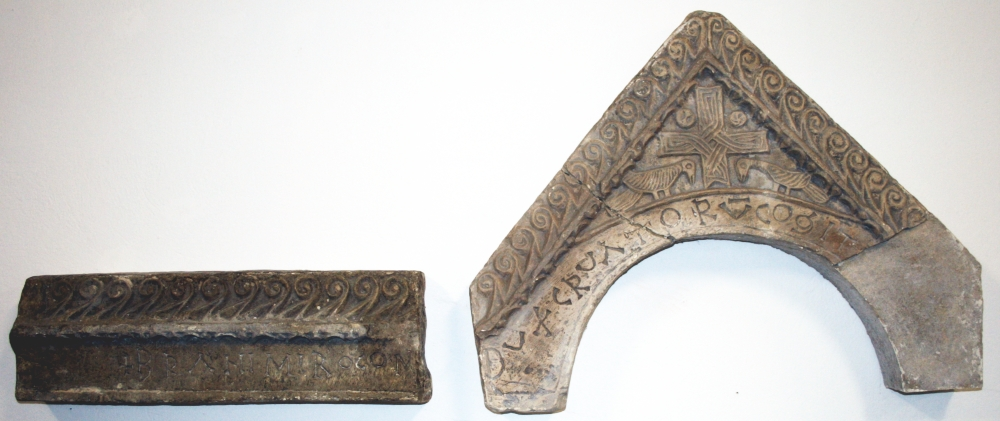
Inscription of duke Branimir, 879–892

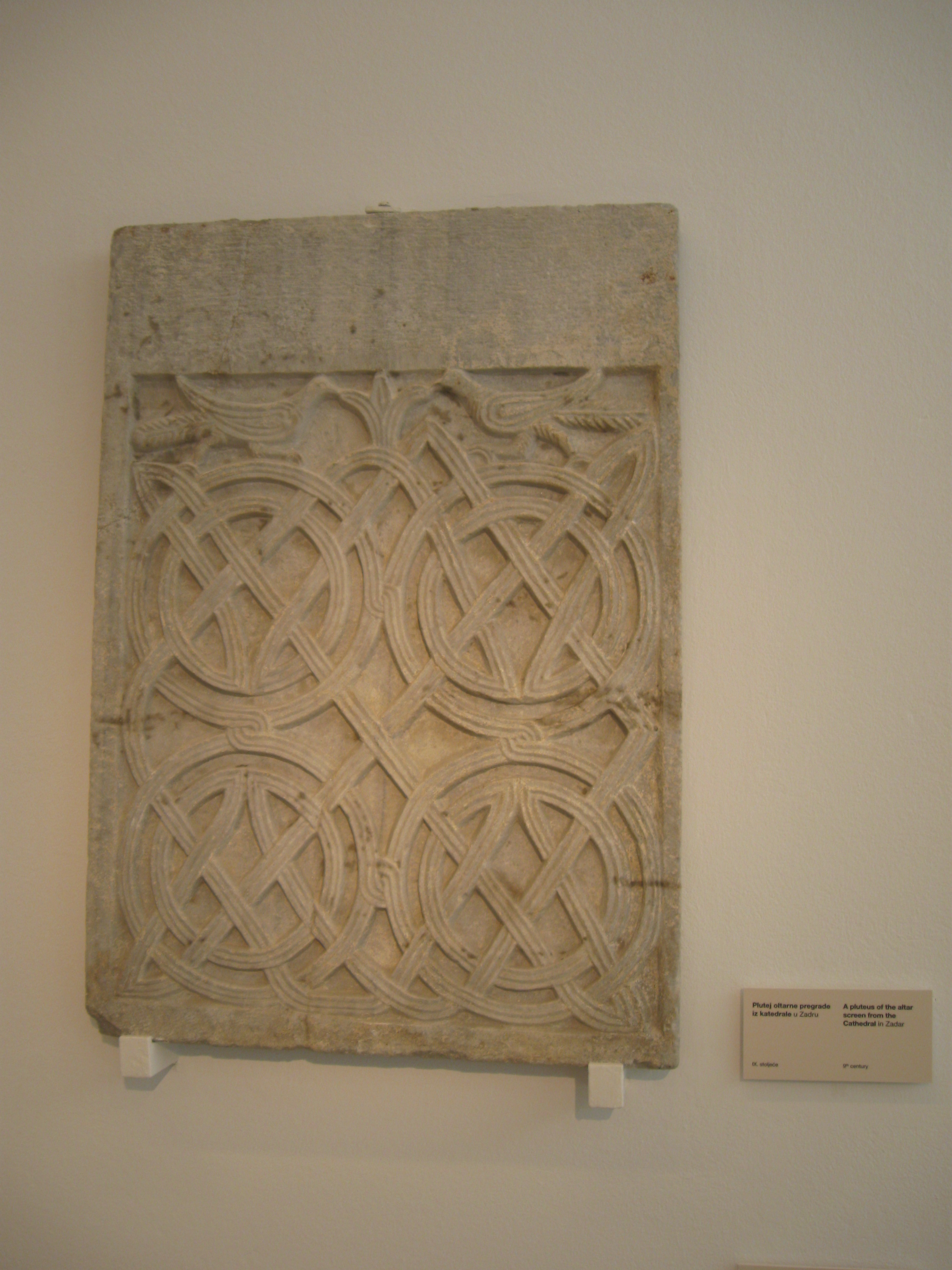
Pluteus from the 9th century

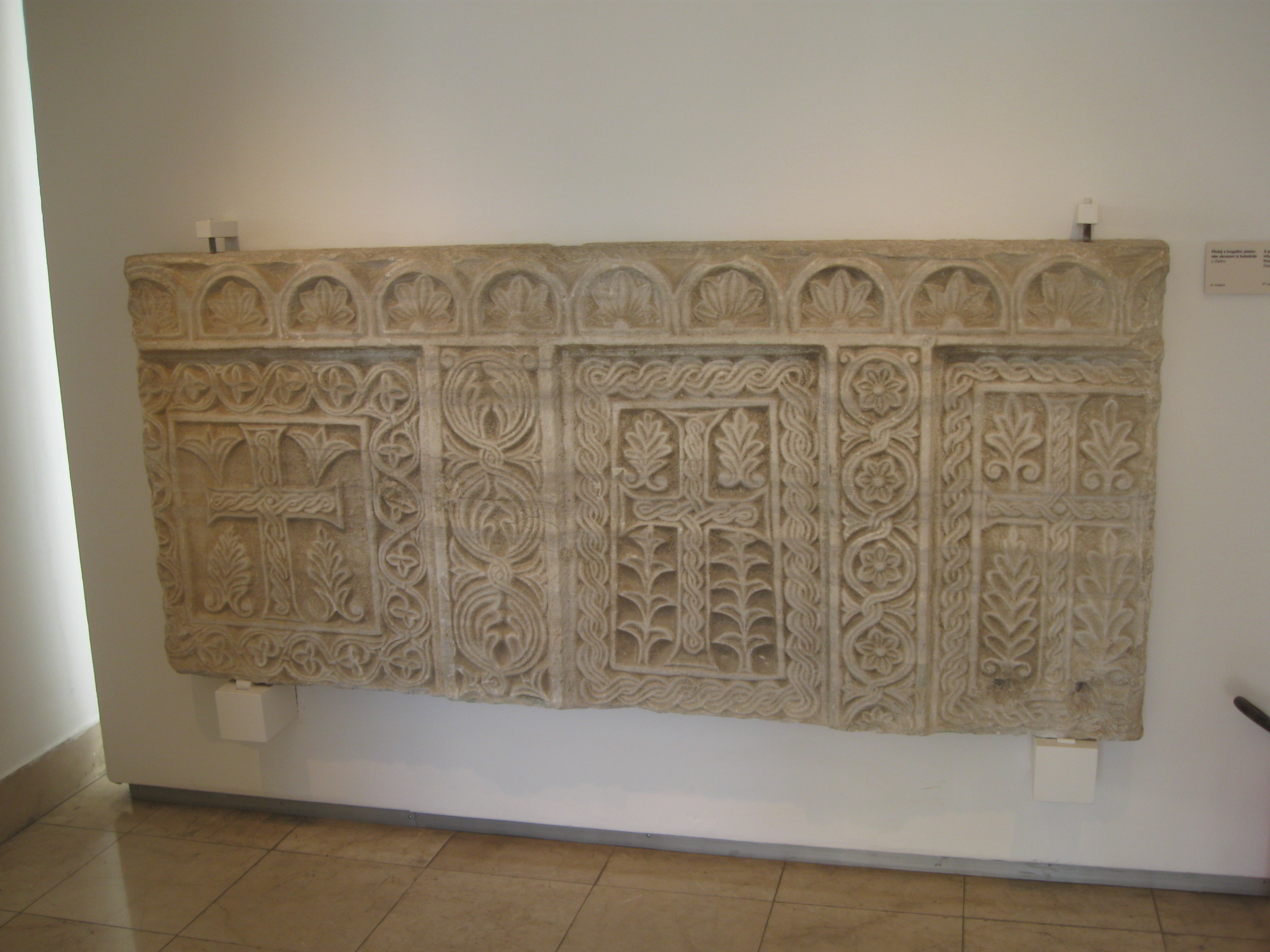
Pluteus from the 9th century

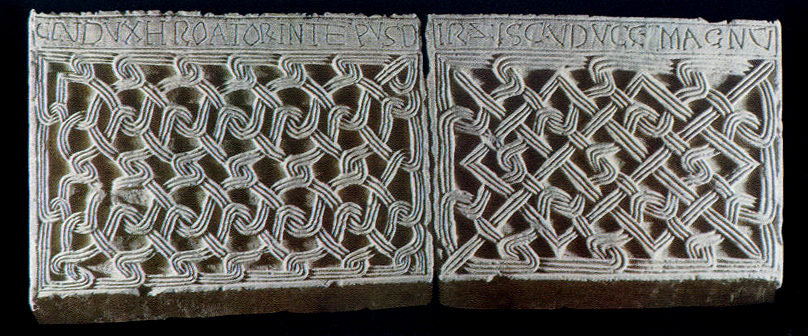
Inscription of king Stephen Držislav, mid-10th century

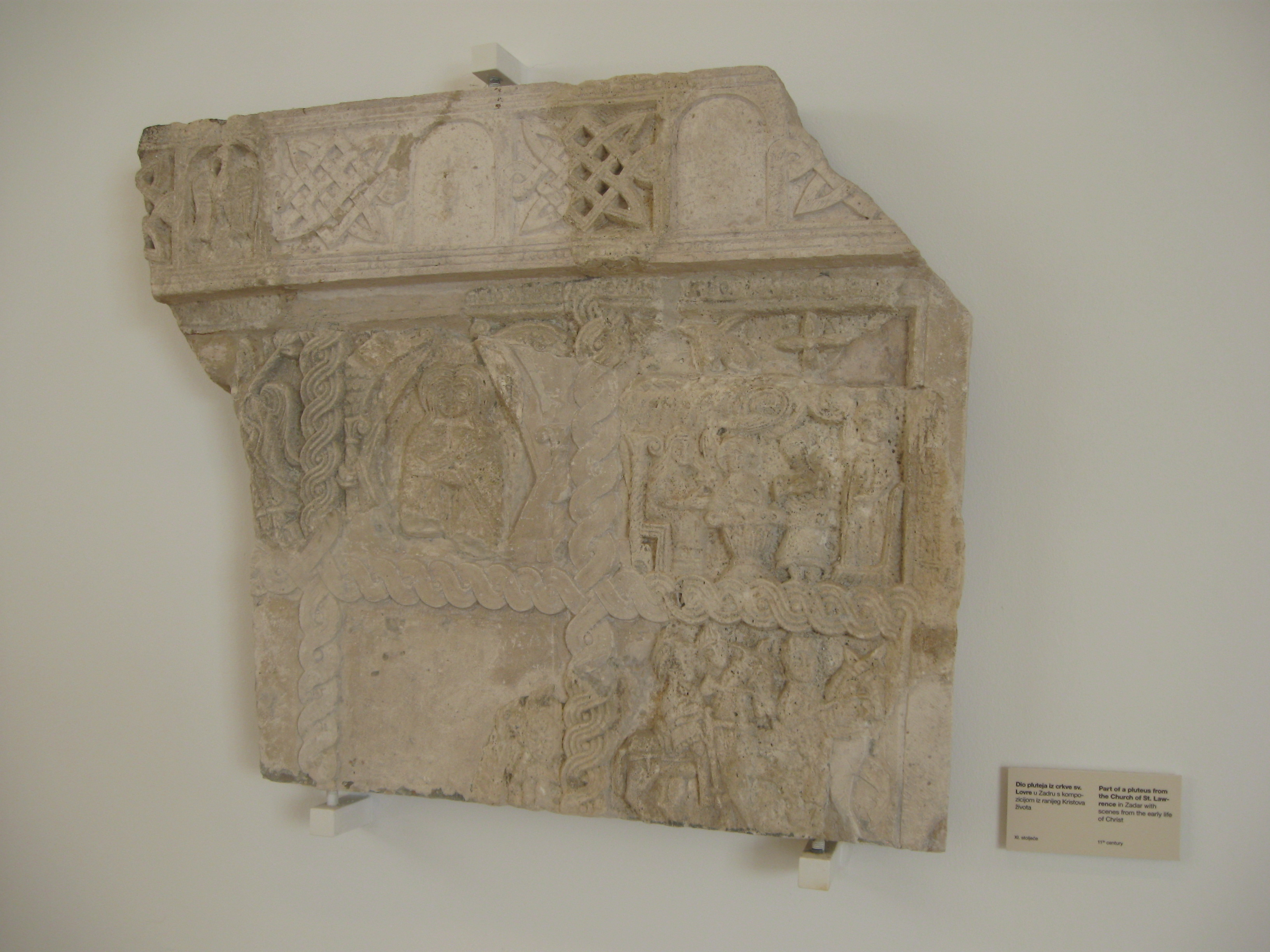
Part of pluteus from the 11th century

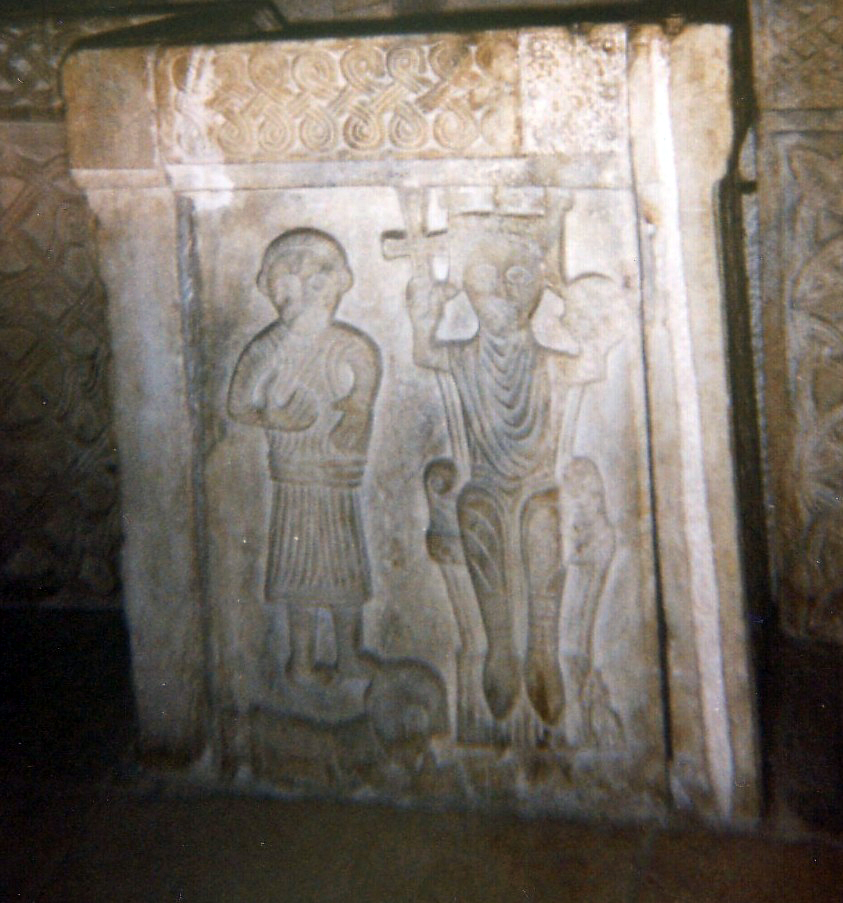
Font from the late-11th century (most likely a depiction of Petar Krešimir IV or Demetrius Zvonimir)

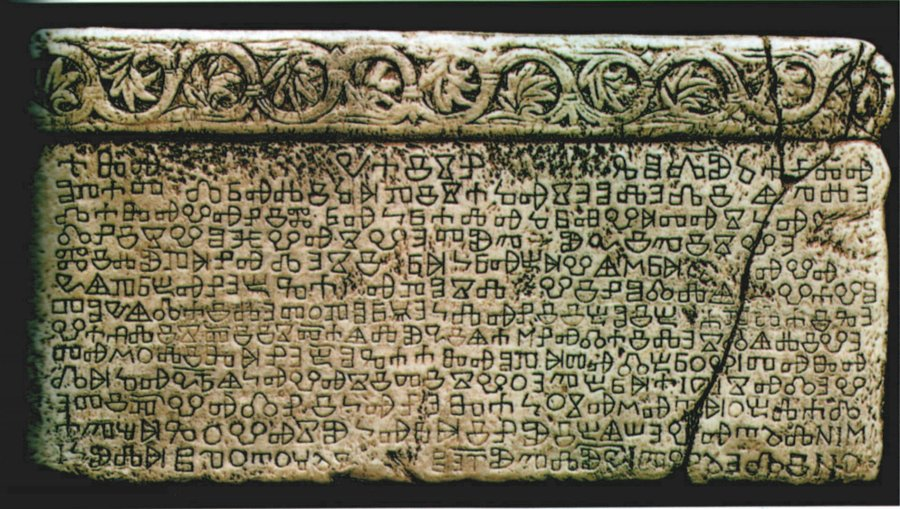
Baška tablet

Emblem of the Ustaše, a former fascist and ultranationalist organization, as displayed on the state symbols of the Independent State of Croatia

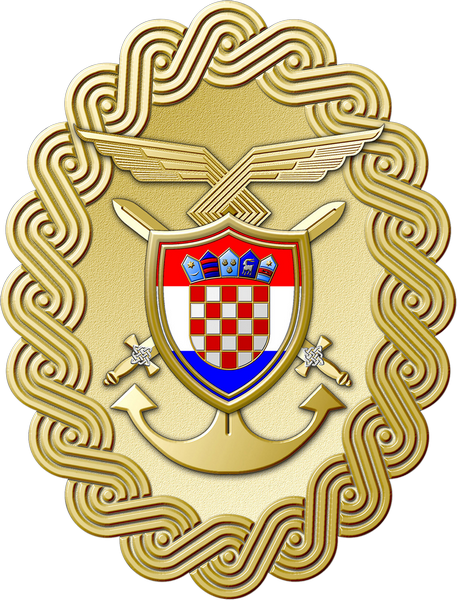
Croatian interlace bordering the Seal of Armed Chief of General Staff of the Armed Forces of Croatia

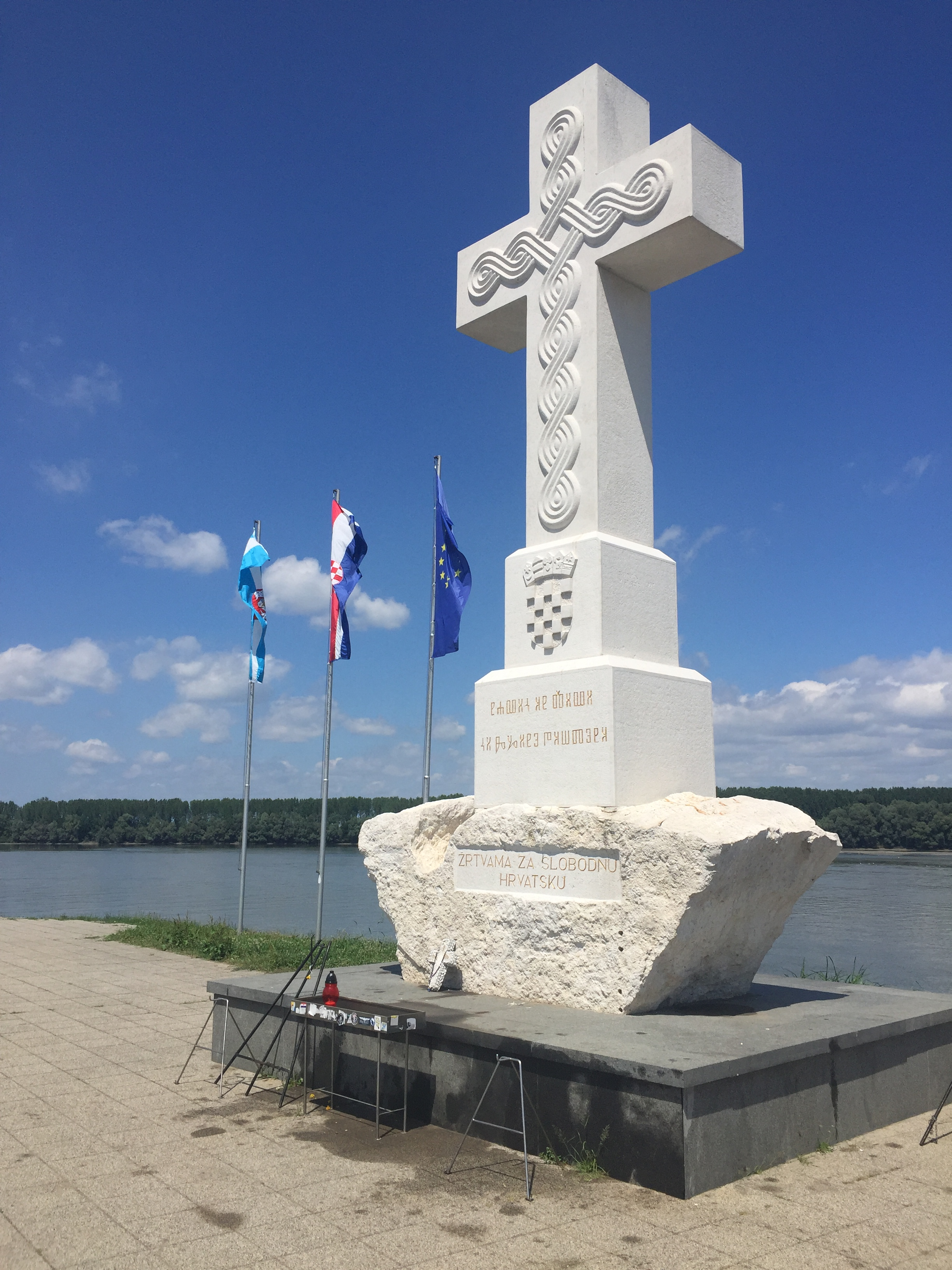
Croatian interlace on the Cross at the confluence of the Vuka and Danube in Vukovar

== See also ==
- National symbols of Croatia
- Interlace (art)
