= Ljubo Karaman =

Croatian historian, art theorist and conservator

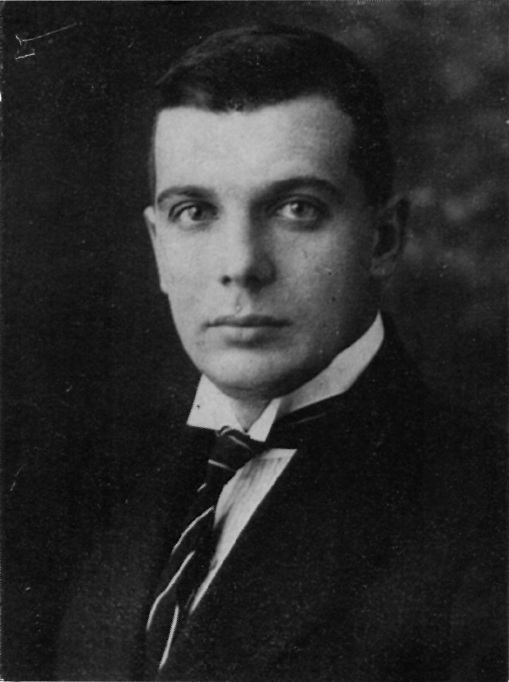
- Karaman in 1918
- Born: 15 June 1886; Split, Kingdom of Dalmatia, Austria-Hungary
- Died: 19 April 1971 (aged 84); Zagreb, SR Croatia, SFR Yugoslavia
- Burial place: Mirogoj Cemetery; 45.83250°N 15.98701°E
- Education: University of Vienna

Ljubo Karaman (15 June 1886 – 19 April 1971) was a Croatian historian, art theorist and conservator. After graduating from the Classical Gymnasium in his hometown of Split, Karaman enrolled at the University of Vienna where he graduated in history and geography in 1910 and later in art history. After a few years of working as a highschool professor in Split and Dubrovnik, Karaman became an assistant in the Regional Conservation Office of Dalmatia in 1919 and chief conservator in 1926. In 1941 he was pressured by the Italian authorities in Axis-occupied Split to move to Zagreb, where he would head the Zagreb Conservation Office until his retirement in 1950. The bulk of his work involved monuments in Dalmatia dating from ancient times until the Baroque.
