= Šibenik =

- City
- Grad Šibenik; City of Šibenik
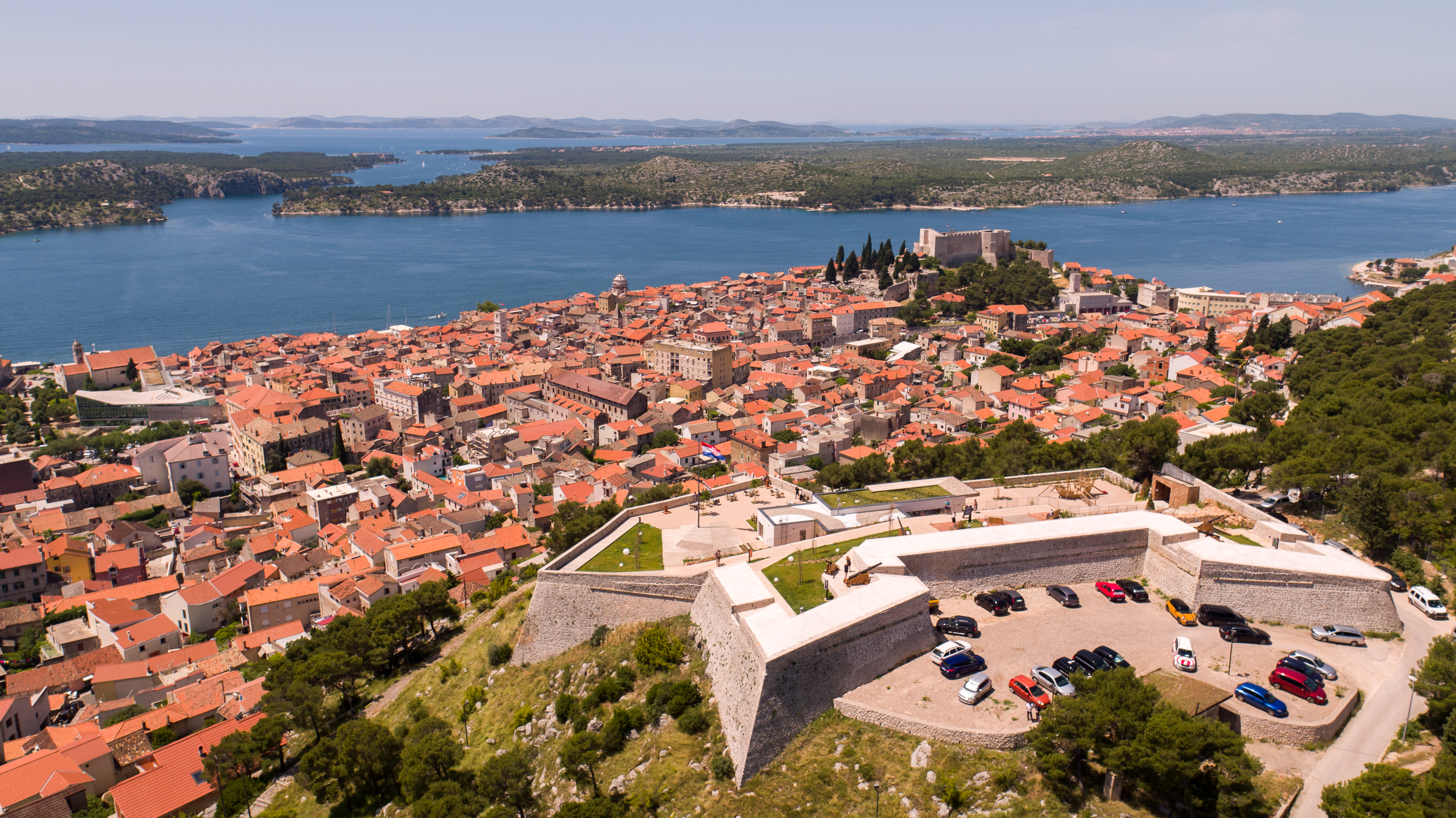
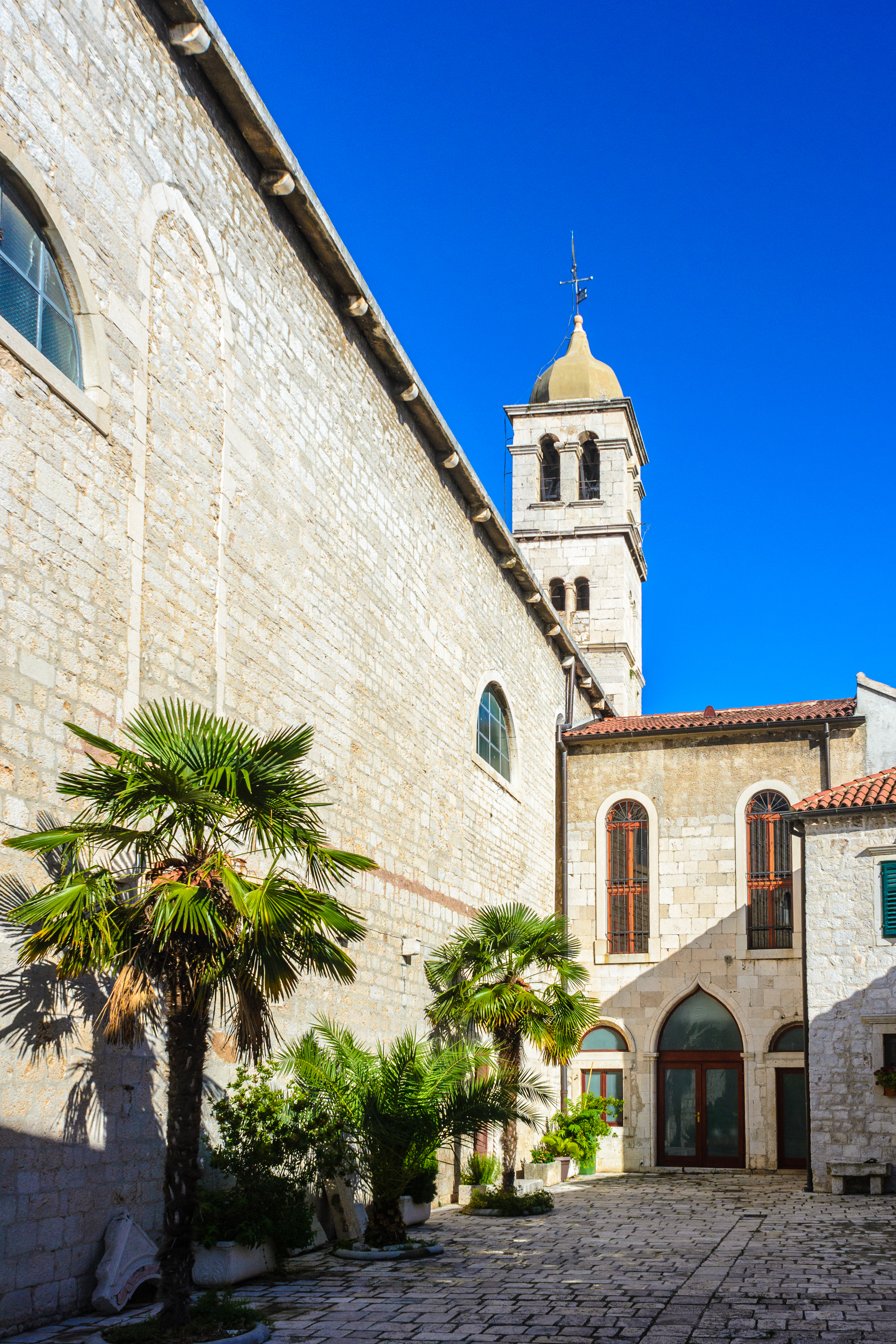
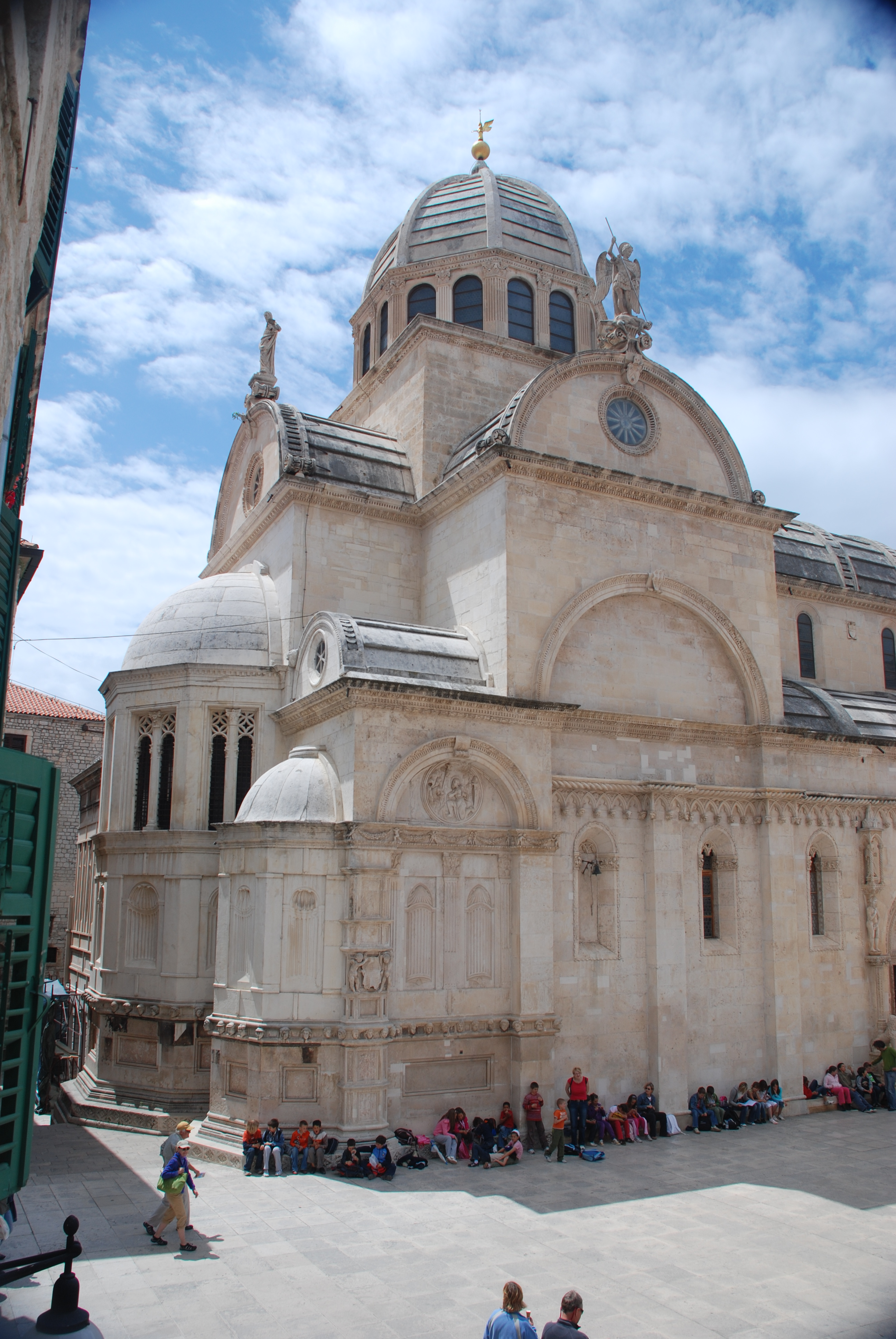
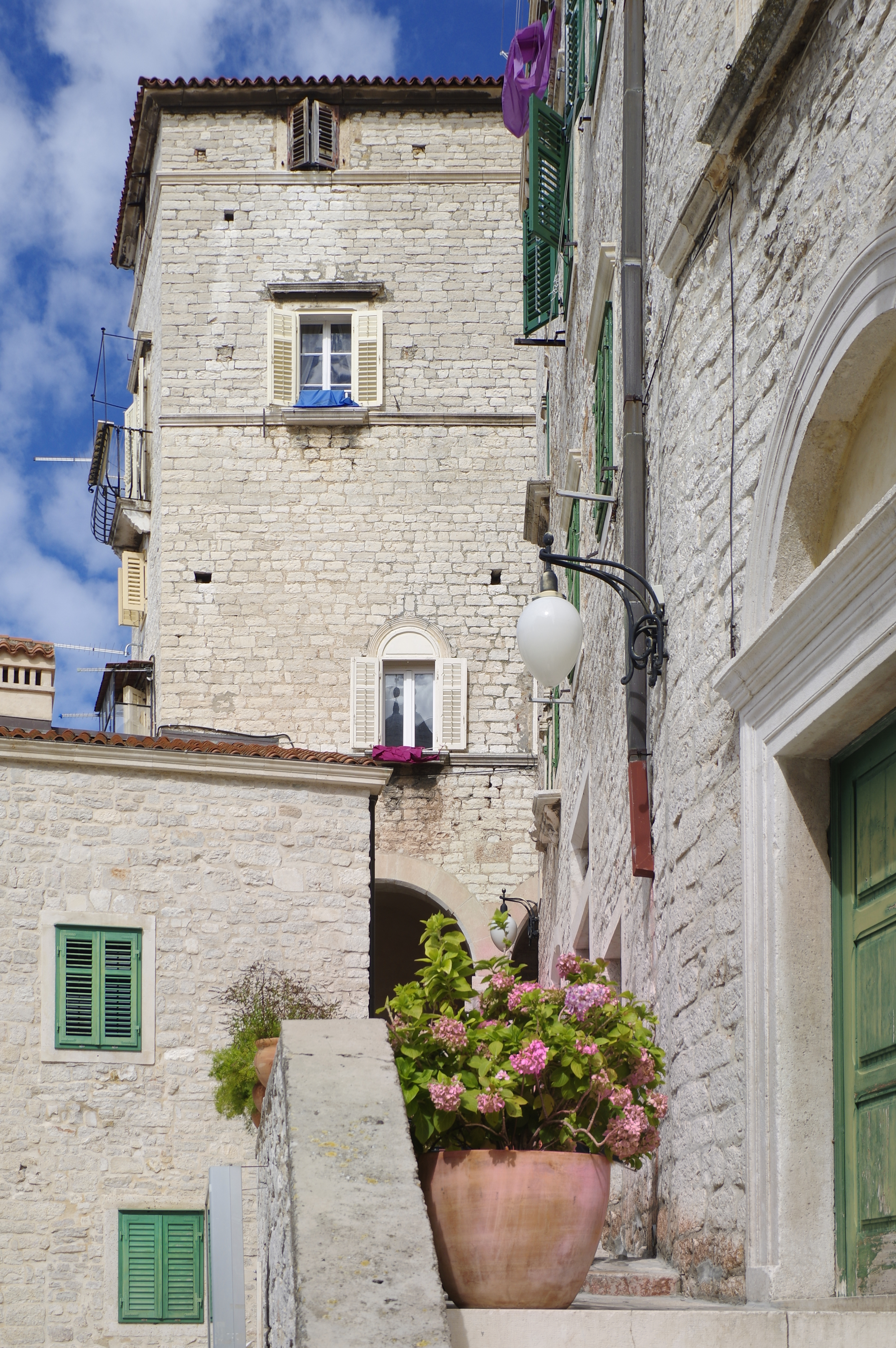
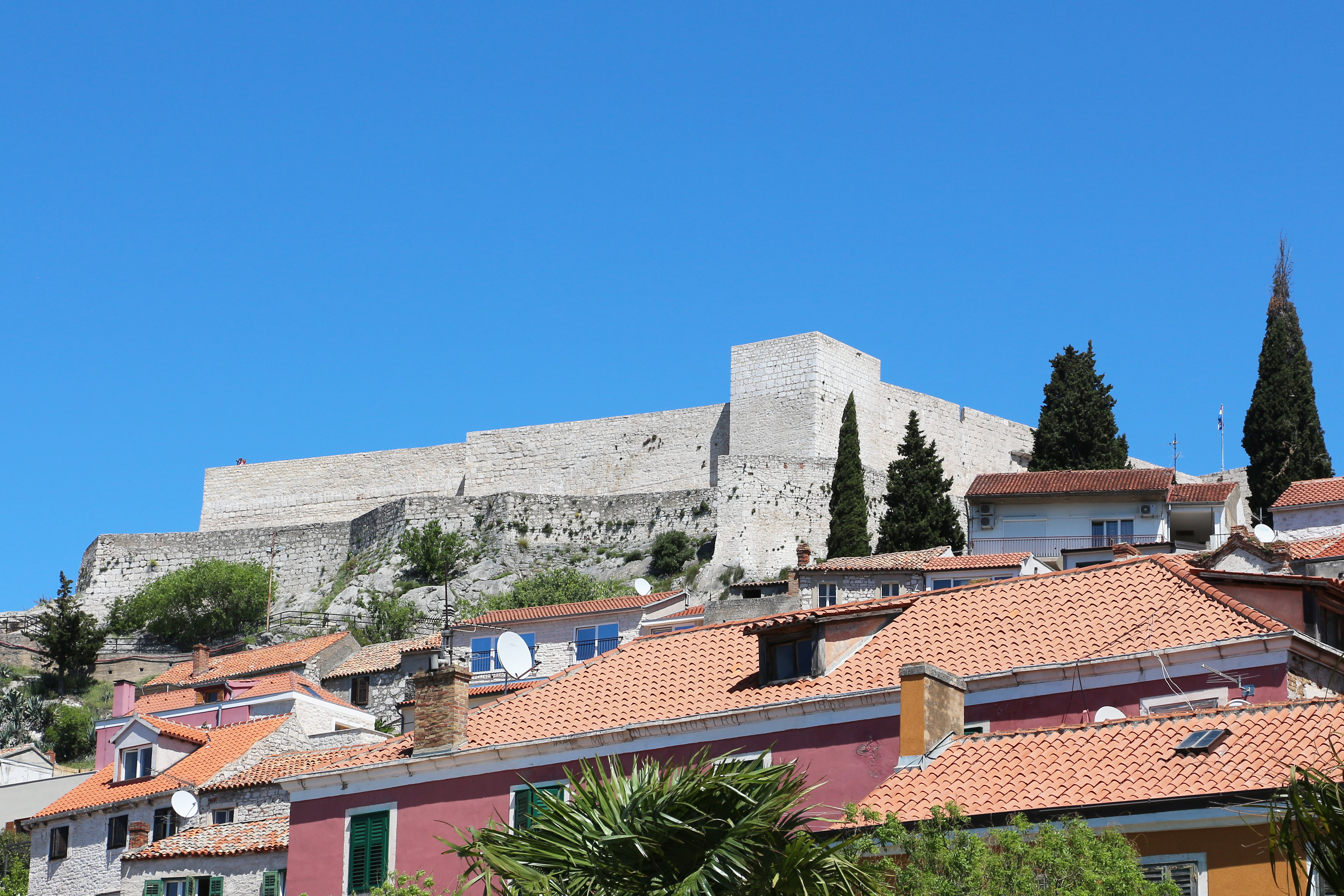
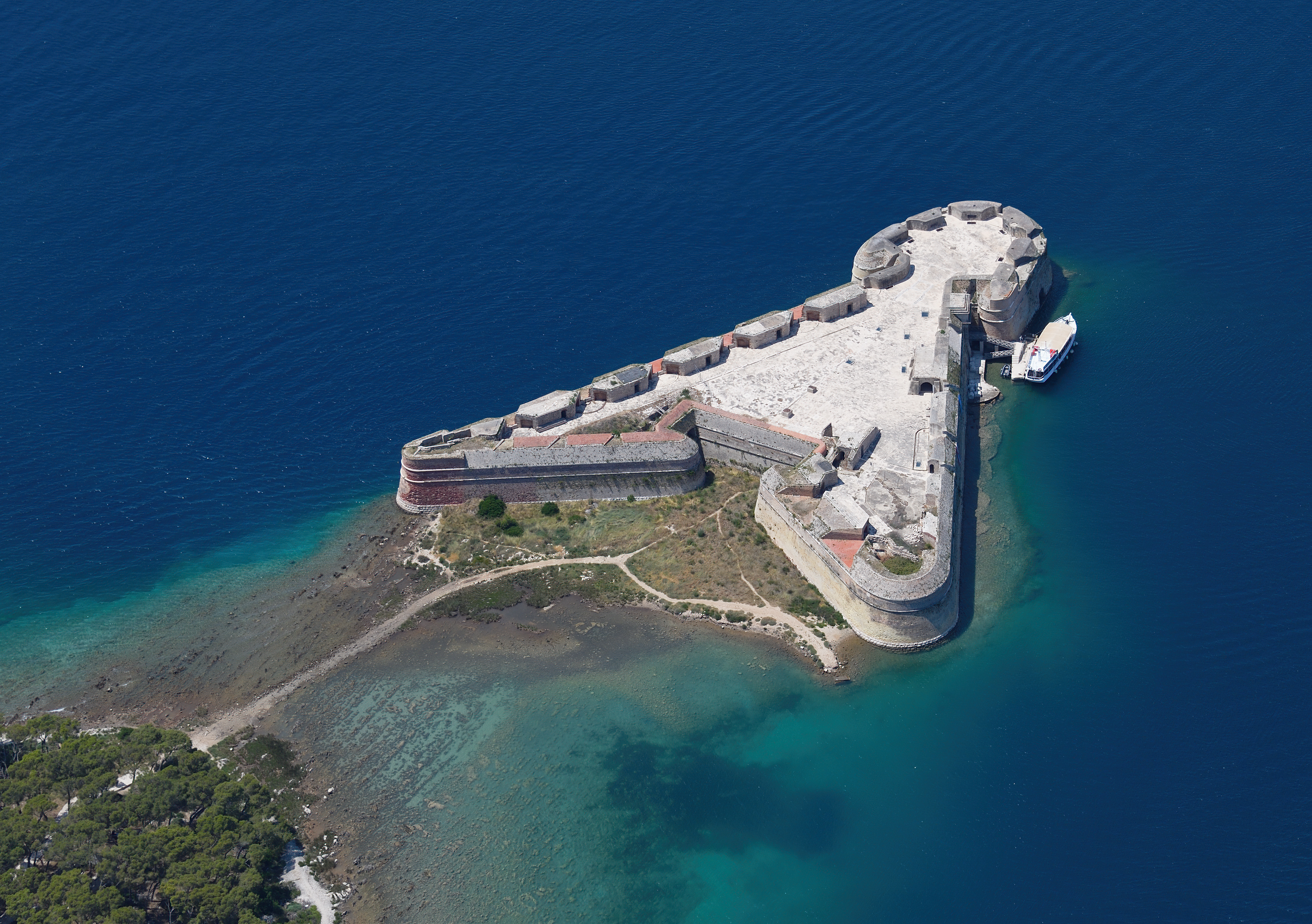
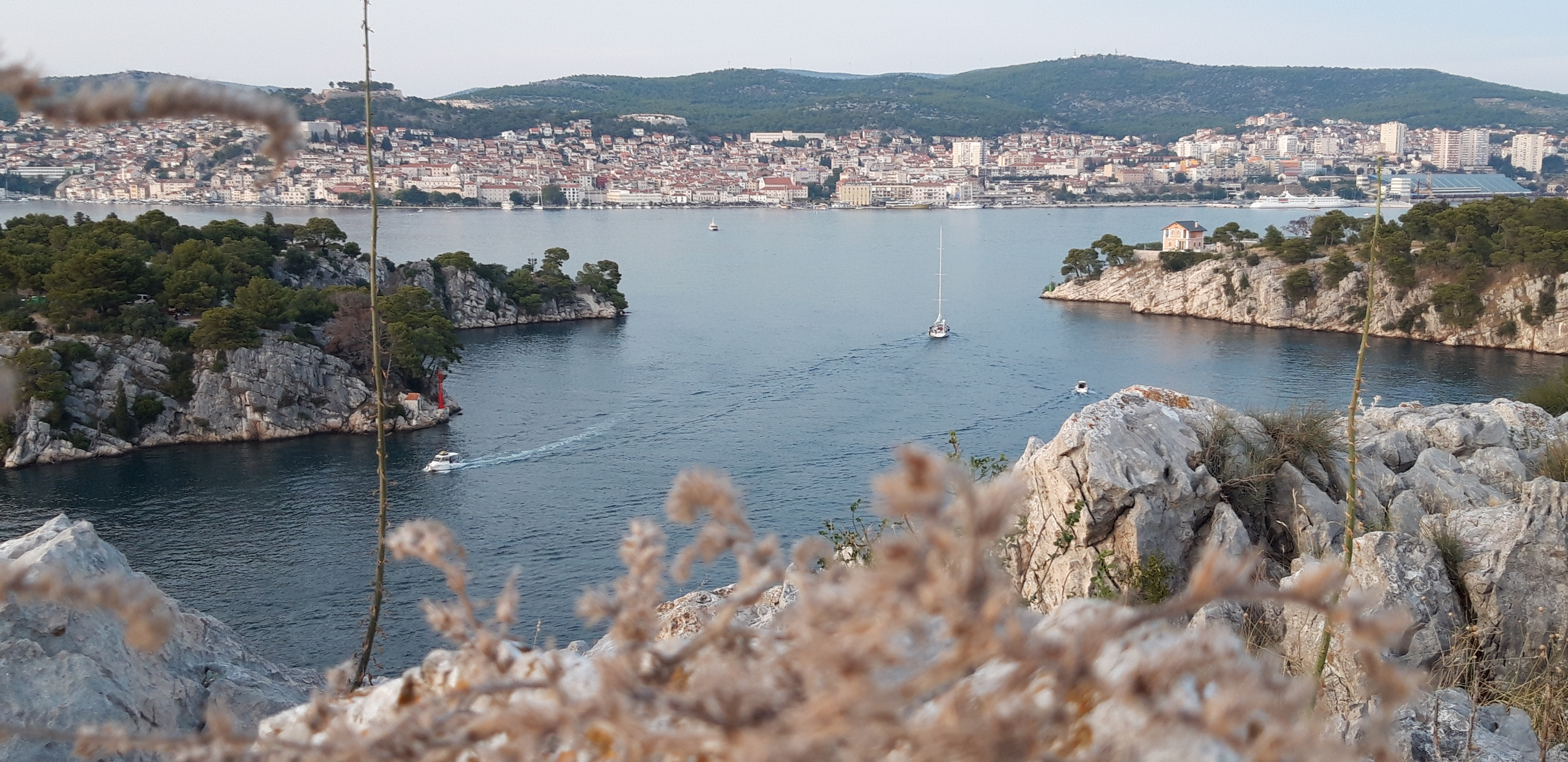
- View of Šibenik from Barone Fortress St. Francis Monastery Šibenik Cathedral House of Juraj Dalmatinac St. Michael's Fortress St. Nicholas Fortress St. Anthony Channel and Panorama Viewpoint

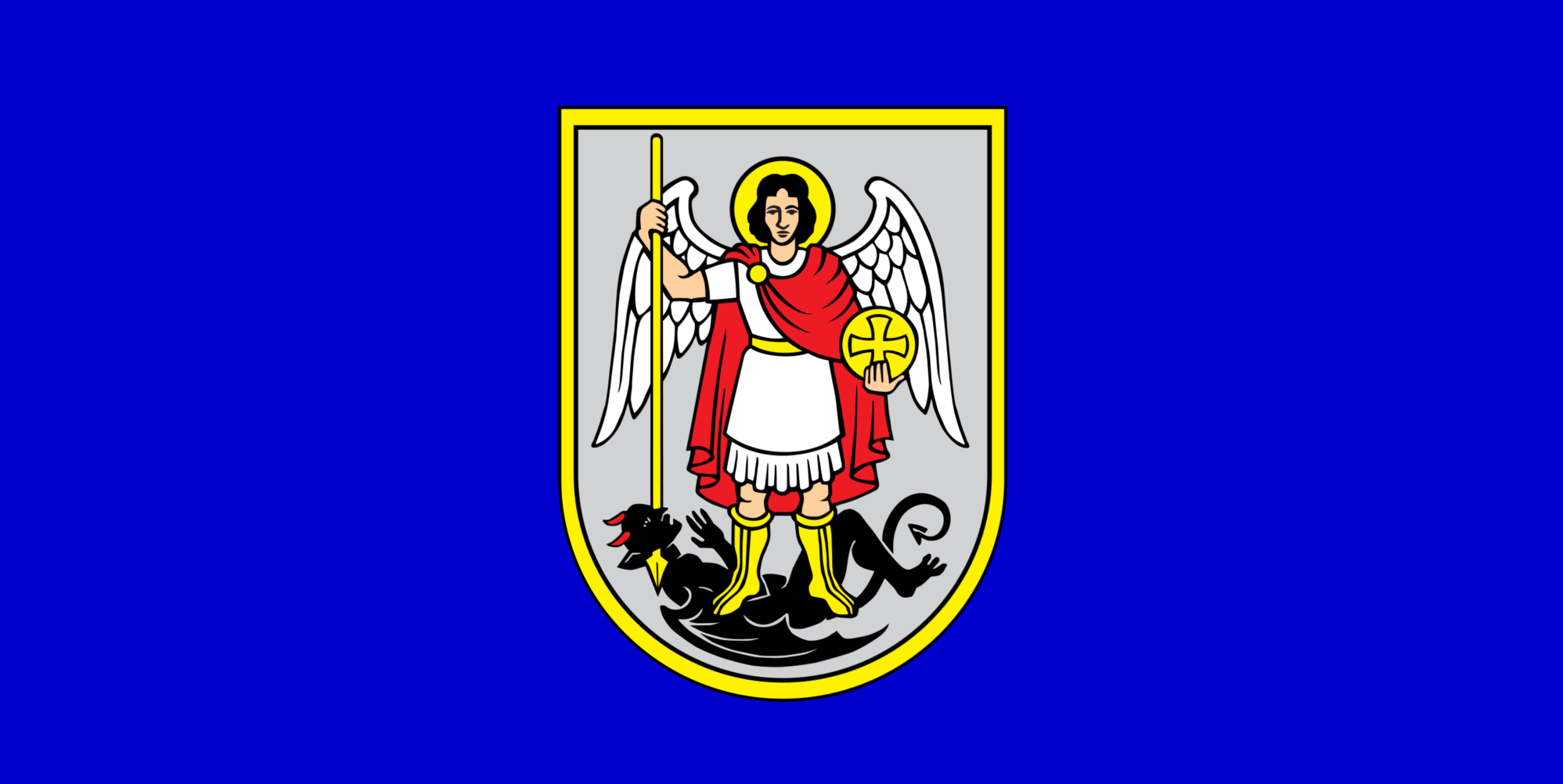
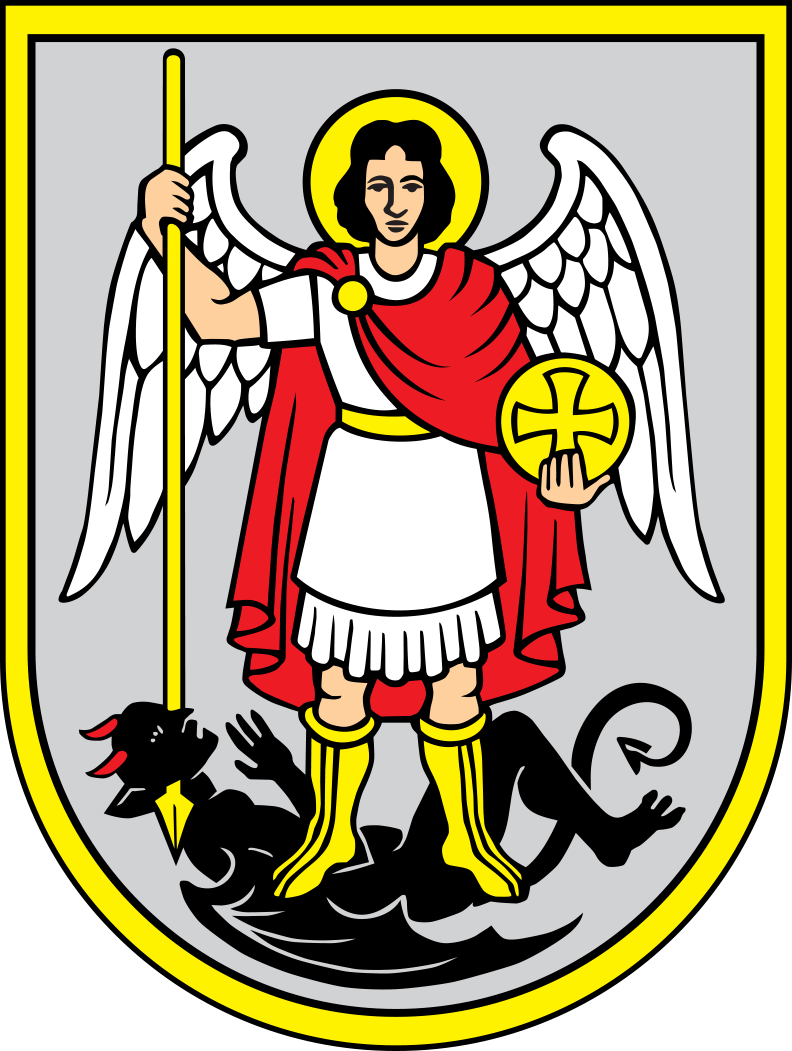
- Flag Seal
- Interactive map of Šibenik
- Location of Šibenik within Croatia
- Coordinates: 43°44′03″N 15°53′40″E
- Country: Croatia
- Region: Dalmatia
- County: Šibenik-Knin County

Government
  - Type: Mayor-Council
  - Mayor: Željko Burić (HDZ)
  - City Council: 21 members: HDZ (10); NLSP (4); SDP–NL (4); HS–HKS–Hrast–NHR (2); Most–DP–Loza (1)

Area
  - City: 399.5 km^{2} (154.2 sq mi)
  - Urban: 44.1 km^{2} (17.0 sq mi)
- Elevation: 0 m (0 ft)

Population (2021)
  - City: 42,599
  - Density: 106.6/km^{2} (276.2/sq mi)
  - Urban: 31,115
  - Urban density: 706/km^{2} (1,830/sq mi)
- Time zone: UTC+1 (CET)
  - Summer (DST): UTC+2 (CEST)
- Postal code: HR-22 000
- Area code: +385 22
- License plate: ŠI
- Climate: Csa
- Website: sibenik.hr

UNESCO World Heritage Site
- Official name: The Cathedral of St James
- Criteria: Cultural: i, ii, iv
- Reference: 963
- Inscription: 2000 (24th Session)

Šibenik (Croatian: [ʃîbeniːk]) is a historic town in Croatia, located in central Dalmatia, where the river Krka flows into the Adriatic Sea. Šibenik is one of the oldest Croatian self-governing cities on the Adriatic, the capital and cultural, educational, administrative and economic center of Šibenik-Knin County, and is also the third-largest town in the Dalmatian region. As of 2021, the town has 31,115 inhabitants, while the municipality has 42,599 inhabitants.The seat is the Šibenik Diocese.

It was first mentioned on Christmas 1066 in a grant of Peter Krešimir IV, so it is also called "Krešimir's Town". Until the plague pandemic in 17th century it was the largest city on the entire eastern coast of the Adriatic. Šibenik was the de facto capital of the Socialist Republic of Croatia from December 1944 to May 1945. It is also significant as the place of foundation of the Croatian Navy.

The Cathedral of St. James is the most significant architectural achievement of the 15th and 16th centuries on the soil of Croatia. Due to its exceptional values, it was included in the UNESCO World Cultural Heritage List in 2000, which was joined on that list by the Fortress of St. Nicholas.

== History ==
=== Etymology ===
There are multiple interpretations of how Šibenik was named. In his fifteenth-century book De situ Illiriae et civitate Sibenici, Giorgio Sisgoreo describes the name and location of Šibenik. He attributes the name of the city to it being surrounded by a palisade made of šibe 'switches/twigs'. Some argue the name is of Illyrian origin, or derived from the family name of the Šubićs. Another interpretation is associated with the forest through the Latin toponym Sibinicum, which covered a narrower microregion within Šibenik on and around the area of St. Michael's Fortress.

=== Prehistory ===
Tarion was an ancient city located in the area between the Krka River in the north and Cape Ploče in the south, branching out along the coast. According to Pliny's notes, Tarion was the home of the Tarioti people, who were indigenous people. According to Pliny's notes, the Tarioti people mainly practiced a pastoral lifestyle, which can be determined by archaeological remains dedicated to the god Silvanus. Of course, in addition to their pastoral lifestyle, their geographical position allowed them to connect with other important cities of the time, such as Danilo, and to have a quality road connection, which is why it was important for the Romans themselves and the people who lived in the area.

=== Foundation and the Middle Ages ===
Šibenik is one of the oldest native Croatian towns on the Adriatic Sea. Not much is known about the earliest history of Šibenik, or the exact date of its foundation. According to current scientific discoveries, it is assumed that it was founded during the reign of Prince Domagoj in the 9th century. It initially developed as a fortress (castrum) with an older suburb (suburbium) in the Dolac area and a younger one on the eastern side of the castle, where the church of St. Chrysogonus was built in the 12th century, around which the core of the medieval town later developed. Šibenik belonged to the group of so-called Croatian towns, and it arose on a hill 70 m above the sea (today's St. Michael's Fortress). In the area of Šibenik, no traces of ancient urban tradition have been found to this day, but there are certain indications of life in late antiquity. It was first mentioned on Christmas 1066 when King Peter Krešimir IV, at a meeting of high state and church dignitaries, issued a document granting royal freedom and protection to the Benedictine Monastery of St. Mary in Zadar. It was at this time that Šibenik was strengthened, as part of the king's efforts to create a counterbalance to the Romanesque cities of the Byzantine theme of Dalmatia with the help of Croatian cities. After the battle with the Hungarian army at the Peter's Mountain in 1097 and the death of the Croatian ruler Peter Snačić, Šibenik recognized the rule of the Croatian-Hungarian king Koloman in 1105.

In the period after the loss of the national ruler on the Croatian throne, Venice, Byzantium and Arpadović fought for power over Šibenik continuously until 1180. In the 12th century, in the legal sense, it was a fortified settlement (castrum, oppidum), not a city (civitas), so its future efforts were directed towards achieving a city status, which would reach other Dalmatian cities (such as Zadar, Trogir and Split. In 1169, Šibenik was granted city status and the right to mint coins by the Hungarian king Stephen III. However, only after bitter disputes and a long struggle with Trogir did Šibenik manage to win its own diocese and in 1298 the Šibenik diocese was founded – the true status of a city in the Middle Ages. The Šibenik diocese was established by a bull of Pope Boniface VIII on 1 May 1298. The act of establishment itself took place in Šibenik on 28 June of the same year, and the papal bull was proclaimed and the first bishop, Fr. Martin Rabljanin, was consecrated. The cathedral church was the then Church of St. James the Apostle. It was destroyed by fire in 1380. Soon, people began to think about building a new, larger cathedral.

From the end of the 13th century, Šibenik recognized the rule of Croatian princes, first prince Domald (1200–1226), and then the princes of Bribir (until 1322). During the reign of the latter, Šibenik became the episcopal seat and gained a city status, but it lagged behind economically due to heavy taxes and obligations. This was the cause of the outbreak of a rebellion against the Bribirski government; then, with the support of the Republic of Venice, the city managed to fight off the rule of Mladen II., but eventually lost its autonomy and the right to freely elect a prince, who was elected by the Venetians from then on. The city again came under Angevin rule after the defeat of the Venetian Republic in the war with Louis I Angevin and the signing of the Peace of Zadar (1358). From 1390, together with other cities in Dalmatia (except Zadar), it recognized the rule of the Bosnian king Tvrtko I. Kotromanić, and at the beginning of the 15th century, of the Bosnian duke Hrvoje Vukčić Hrvatinić and king Ladislav of Naples.

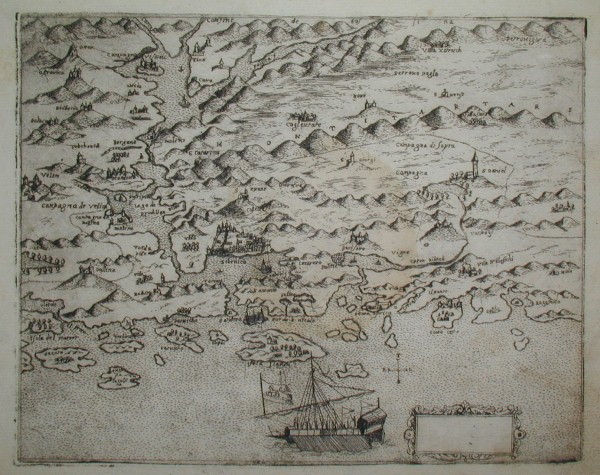
Early 16th century map of Šibenik by Martino Rota

Unlike other cities along the Adriatic coast, which were established by Greeks, Illyrians and Romans, Šibenik was founded by Slavs. It was mentioned for the first time under its present name in 1066 in a Charter of the Croatian King Petar Krešimir IV and, for a period of time, it was a seat of this Croatian King. For that reason, Šibenik is also called "Krešimirov grad" (Krešimir's city).

Between the 11th and 12th centuries, Šibenik was tossed back and forth among Venice, Byzantium, and Hungary. It was conquered by the Republic of Venice in 1116, who held it until 1124, when they briefly lost it to the Byzantine Empire, and then held it again until 1133 when it was retaken by the Kingdom of Hungary. It would change hands among the aforementioned states several more times until 1180.

The city was given the status of a town in 1167 from Stephen III of Hungary. It received its own diocese in 1298.

=== Under Venice ===
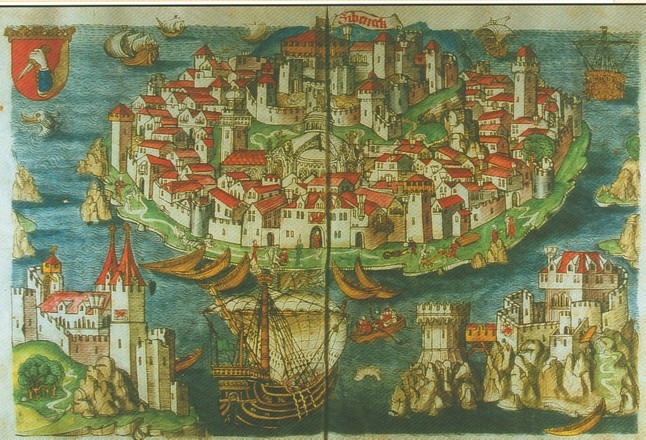
Šibenik in 1486, painted by Konrad von Grünberger

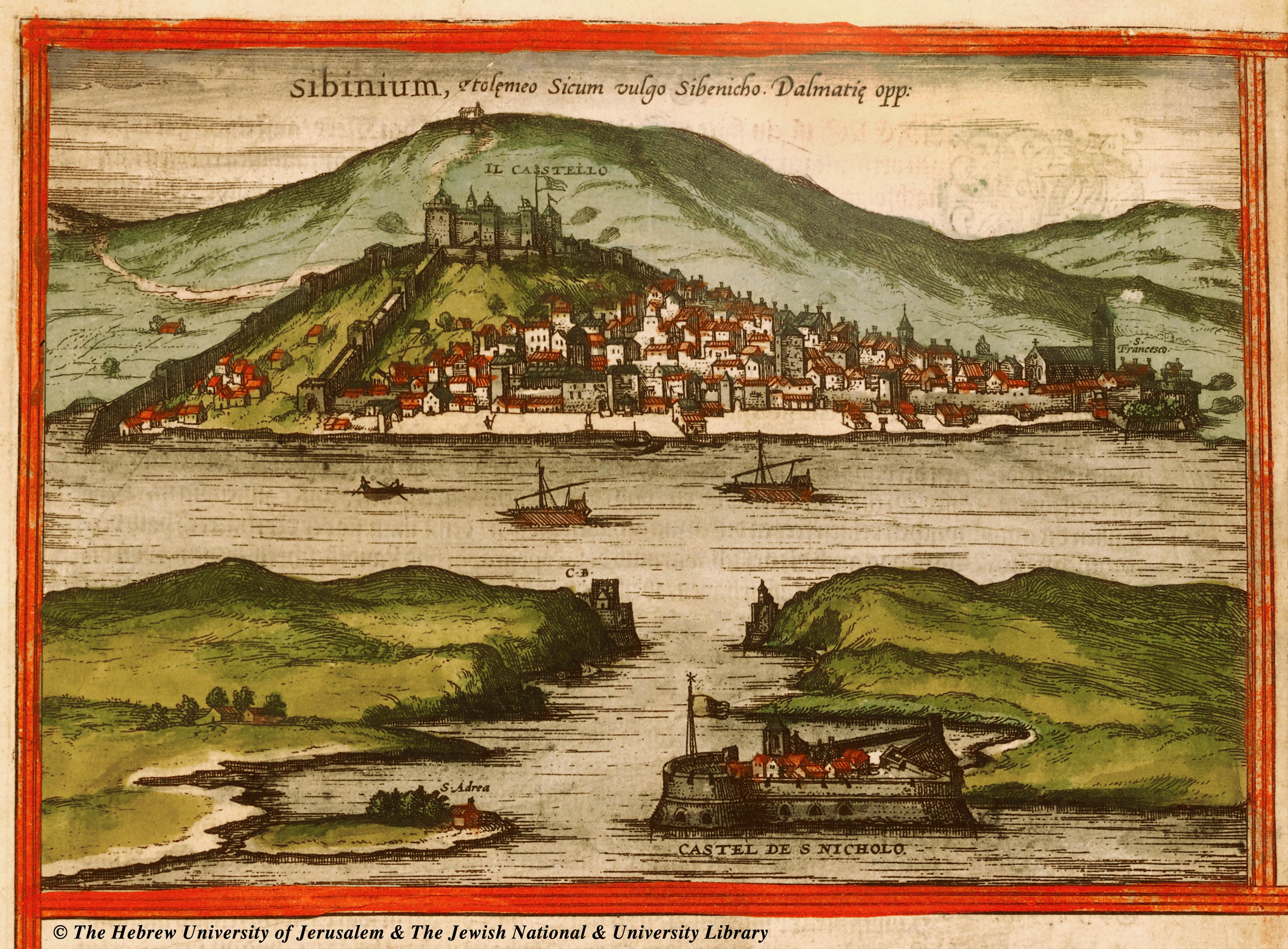
Šibenik in 1575, by Braun and Hogenberg

The city, like the rest of Dalmatia, initially resisted the Venetian Republic, but it was taken over after a three-year war in 1412. Under Venetian rule, Šibenik became in 1412 the seat of the main customs office and the seat of the salt consumers office with a monopoly on the salt trade in Chioggia and on the whole Adriatic Sea.

In August 1417, Venetian authorities were concerned with the "Morlachs and other Slavs" from the hinterland, that were a threat to security in Šibenik. The Ottoman Empire started to threaten Šibenik (known as Sebenico), as part of their struggle against Venice, at the end of the 15th century, but they never succeeded in conquering it. In the 16th century, St. Nicholas Fortress was built and, by the 17th century, its fortifications were improved again by the fortresses of St. John (Tanaja) and Šubićevac (Barone).

The Morlachs started settling Šibenik during the Cretan War (1645–69).

The fall of the Republic of Venice in 1797 brought Sebenico under the authority of the Habsburg monarchy.

Annexed by the French Empire and included in its Illyrian Provinces during the Napoleonic Wars, the town became (again) part of the Austrian monarchy after the Congress of Vienna. The compromise of 1867 brought it in the Austrian side of the Austro-Hungarian Empire, until 1918. During this Austrian period, it was the capital of the district of the same name, one of the 13 district captaincy in the Kingdom of Dalmatia. The Italian name Sebenico only was used until around 1871.

In 1872, at the time in the Kingdom of Dalmatia, Ante Šupuk became the town's first Croat mayor elected under universal suffrage. He was instrumental in the process of the modernization of the city, and is particularly remembered for the 1895 project to provide street lights powered by the early AC Jaruga Hydroelectric Power Plant. On 28 August 1895, Šibenik became the world's first city with alternating current-powered street lights.

=== Habsburg Monarchy ===
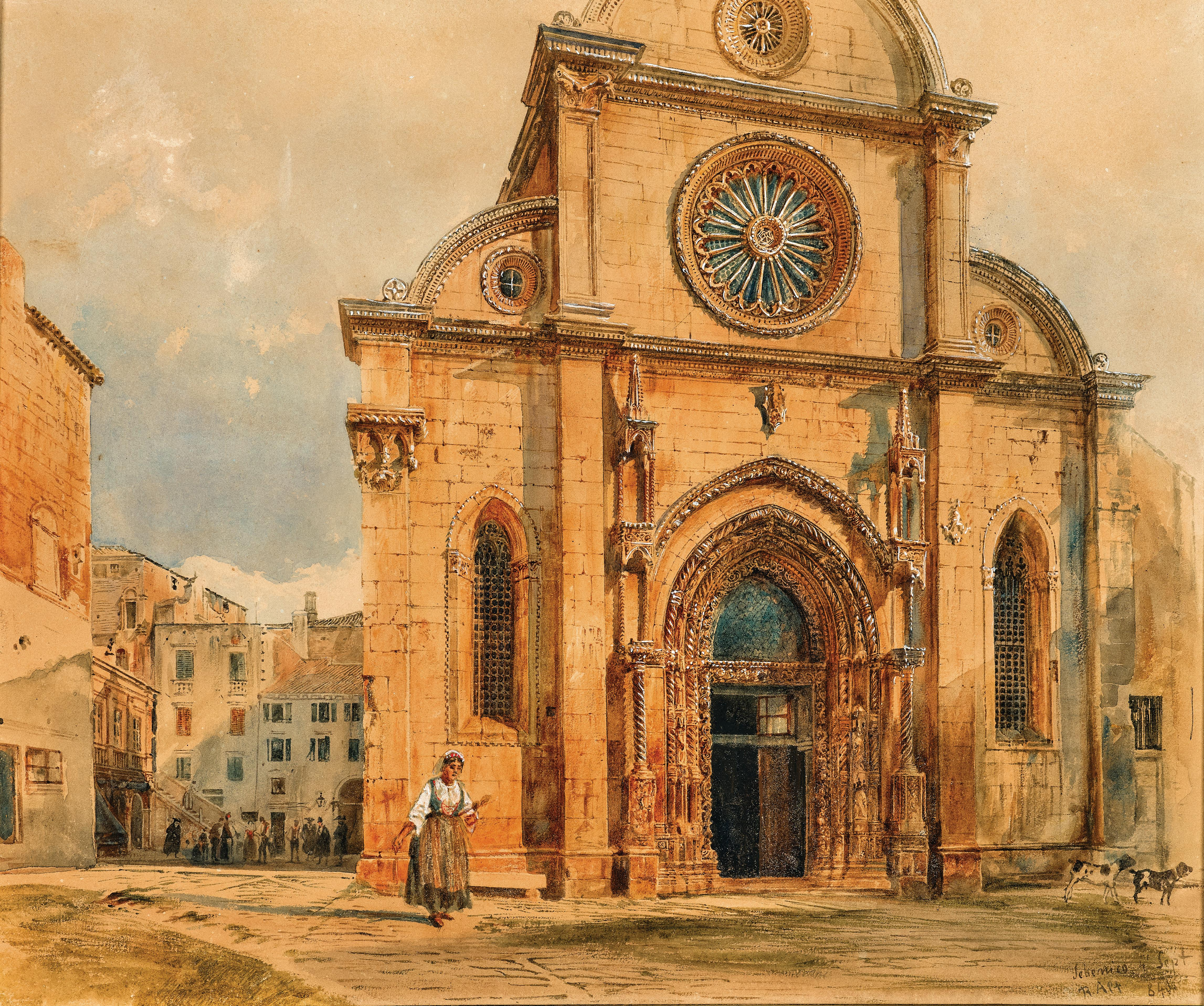
Šibenik Cathedral, painting py Rudolf von Alt, 1840, Dorotheum, Vienna

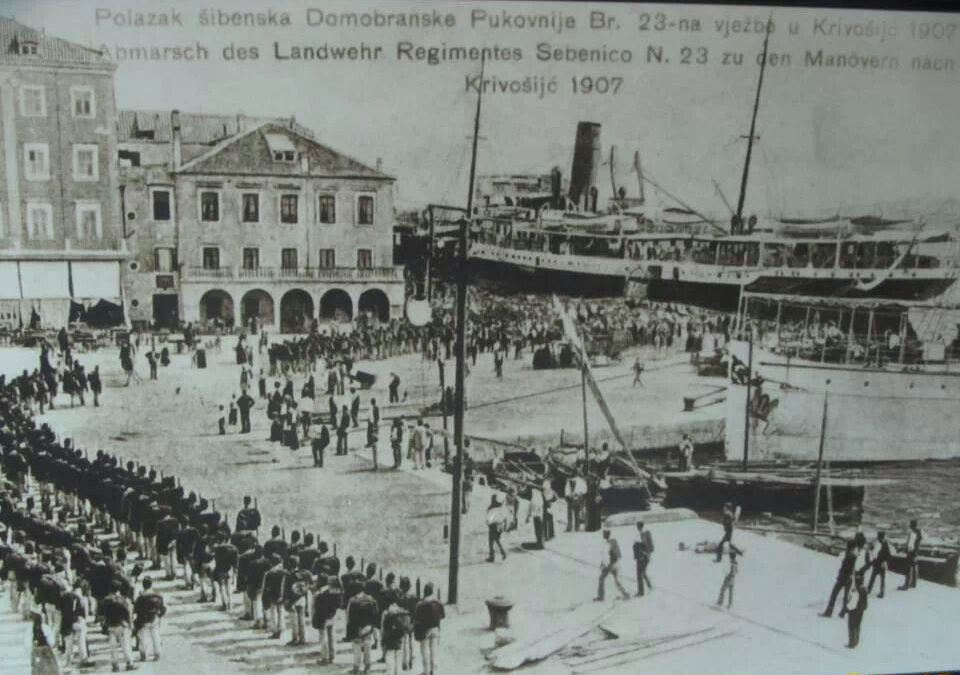
Departure of the Šibenik Home Guard Regiment for exercises in Krivošije

With the collapse of the Venetian state, Šibenik came under the rule of the Austria in 1797. This was preceded by popular unrest led by the pro-Austrian clergy who were afraid of secularists and the bourgeois revolution brought about by the French occupation of the Venetian Republic, and saw all the former Venetian officials as enemies. In these riots in Šibenik, the entire family of the honorary French consul was executed, and most of the other nobles fled to the neighboring islands. In early 1806, the French army entered the city and Šibenik became part of the French Empire, and from 1810 of the autonomous Illyrian Provinces, when after many centuries "Illyrian" briefly became the official language. At the beginning of the century, construction of the road to Knin via Konjevrate and Drniš began, which was completed in 1802, and after the arrival of the French, the road network towards Split, Zadar and Rijeka was improved. The French governors were appalled by the backwardness of Venetian Dalmatia, so they tried to modernize agriculture in it, establish a school system, build the first hospital, an orphanage, implement anti-epidemiological protection of the population, and modernize the administration and judiciary. After Napoleon Bonaparte's defeat, the Austrian army conquered Dalmatia and entered Šibenik at the end of 1813.

Šibenik remained part of the Habsburg Monarchy until 1918, as did the rest of the Kingdom of Dalmatia. The beginning of the second part of Austrian absolutist rule represented a period of stagnation in all areas of life. Austria raised strong border control towards Bosnia and defended caravan trade, maritime trade also declined due to the loss of sailing ships, and also due to Austria's lack of a naval strategy, which caused Šibenik to stagnate again. In 1839, the first signs of national awakening appeared, more precisely the Illyrian Movement, by two Šibenik Serbs, Božidar Petranović and Špiro Popović, who created a joint Croatian-Serbian front against the Italianization of Dalmatia. They were visited twice in 1841 by Gaj and Mažuranić. At the same time, among educated citizens, the autonomist and Italian current was even stronger and more widespread, seeing its idol in the Šibenik native Nicoli Tommase, who also became a minister in the government of the briefly restored Venetian Republic. It was not until 1848/49 that the political activity of Šibenik under Austrian rule became more strongly manifested, when a people's municipal assembly was briefly elected after a landslide victory over the autonomists. The Croatian national revival in the city grew stronger, and in 1851, ban Jelačić visited him, in whom the people placed their hopes that he would unite Dalmatia, Croatia and Slavonia, and the city gave him a welcome bigger than when Emperor Francis visited in 1818, but on the eve of Bach's absolutism, Jelačić did not mention unification in his welcoming speech. During the dictatorship, all political life died down for a whole decade and all pro-Slavic ideas were banned, which allowed the re-strengthening of the autonomists who won the first elections in 1865. A particularly significant event for the further development of folk reproducibility occurred in 1866 when the National Slavonic Reading Room was founded, and unlike other cities, the people of Šibenik built the theater themselves in 1870 without the help of the government and the municipality. The turning point occurred in the elections for the Dalmatian Parliament in 1870, when the People's Party won a landslide victory in Šibenik and its surroundings. In 1872, the nationalists won the municipal elections and the following year established the first Croatian municipal administration with Ante Šupuk as mayor, who greatly contributed to the economic and communal progress of the city, which until then was the largest working-class city on the Adriatic. During his term, the Croatian language was introduced as the official language in the municipal administration.

=== 19th and 20th century ===
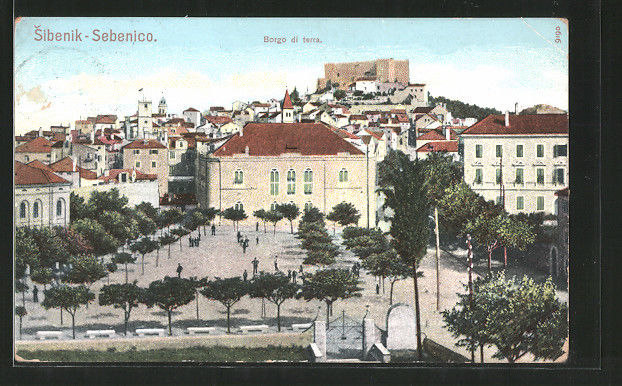
Šibenik's Borgo di Terra (land-side borough) in 1907 - today's Poljana. In the foreground the National Theatre and in the background the Fortress (Tvrđava sv. Mihovila/Castel vecchio).

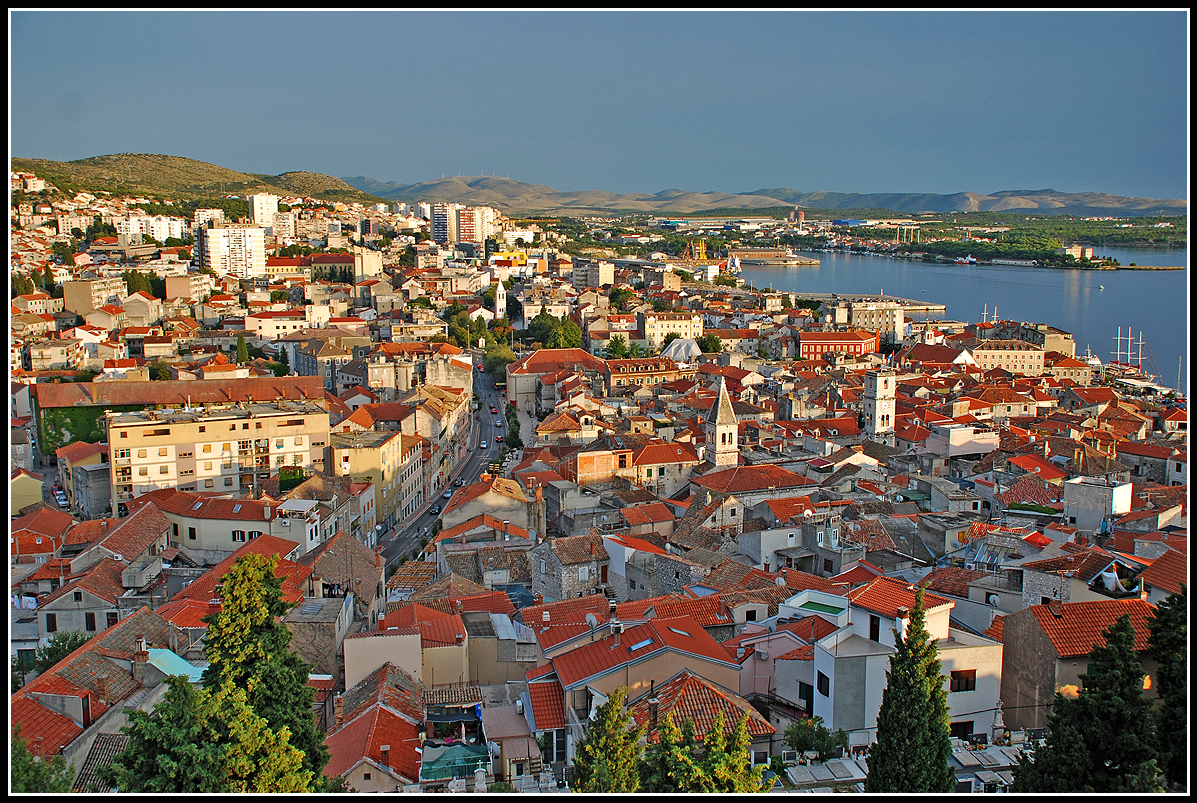
View of Šibenik today

At the beginning of the 19th century, Šibenik society was considered class-based. They ate mainly barley products and various vegetables. Until the arrival of the French government, poor people lived in difficult living conditions in Šibenik. With the arrival of the French government on the territory of Šibenik, modernization began, which also brought a new system of social values and attempted to eliminate inequality among the citizens of Šibenik who belonged to different classes. The hospital was renovated, and citizens could use it free of charge. In the 1870s, Šibenik began to experience even greater prosperity, and this period of Šibenik's history is called the "Šupuk era". At that time, Šibenik was promised a railway that would connect Šibenik with other cities and thus facilitate trade. One of the most important features of Šibenik's development in the 19th century is considered to be the construction of a hydroelectric power plant on the Krka River on August 28, 1895. Possession of a larger amount of electricity only meant accelerated development of Šibenik and enabled the development of various manufacturing and craft facilities.

During World War I, the Austro-Hungarian navy used the port facilities of Šibenik, and the light cruisers and destroyers which escaped the Allied force after the battle of Cape Rodoni (or Gargano) returned to safety in the city, where some battleships were based. After the war Šibenik was occupied by the Kingdom of Italy until 12 June 1921 within the framework of the occupation of the eastern Adriatic. As a result of the Treaty of Rapallo, the Italians gave up their claim to the city and it became a part of the Kingdom of Serbs, Croats and Slovenes. After World War I, the exodus of the Dalmatian Italians from the city began. During World War II, Šibenik was annexed by Italy and was part of the Italian Governorate of Dalmatia from 1941 to 1943 being part of the province of Zara. Communist partisans liberated Šibenik on 3 November 1944.

After World War II it became a part of the SFR Yugoslavia until Croatia declared independence in 1991.

During the Croatian War of Independence (1991–95), Šibenik was heavily attacked by the Yugoslav People's Army and Serbian paramilitary troops. Although under-armed, the nascent Croatian army and the people of Šibenik managed to defend the city. The battle lasted for six days (16–22 September), often referred to as the "September battle". The bombings damaged numerous buildings and monuments, including the dome of the Šibenik Cathedral of St James and the 1870-built theatre building.

In an August 1995 military operation, the Croatian Army defeated the Serb forces and reconquered the occupied areas, which allowed the region to recover from the war and continue to develop as the centre of Šibenik-Knin county. Since then, the damaged areas of the city have been fully restored.

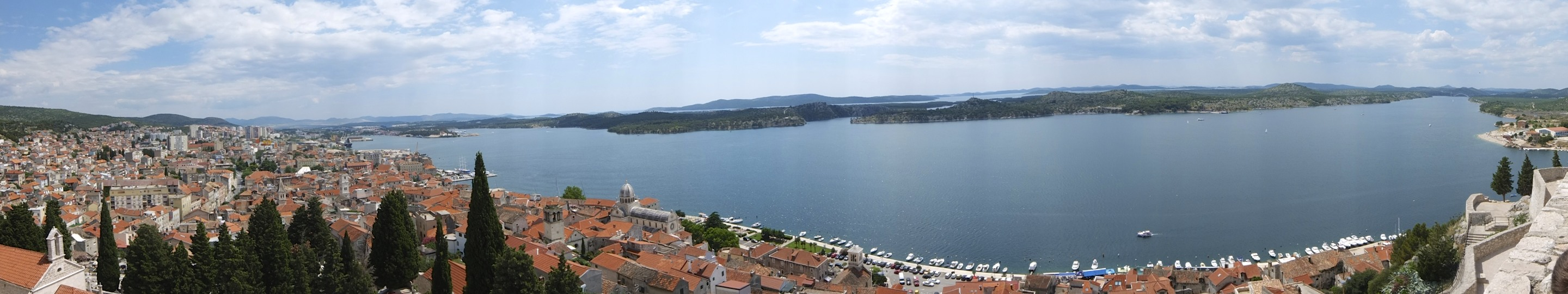
View of southern Šibenik from St. Michael's Fortress

== Geography ==
Šibenik is located at 43˚44' north latitude and 15˚55' east longitude. Geographical position of the city lies amphitheatrically around the Šibenik Bay (a natural harbor in the Adriatic), on the hills of Trtar (496 m), not far from the mouth of the Krka into the sea. It is connected to Zadar in the northwest (79 km away) and Split in the southeast (80 km) by the Adriatic Highway, a highway and a railway. It is connected to the Šibenik islands (Prvić, Zlarin, Žirje, Kaprije, Obonjan) by ferry connections. The relief is characterized by a very indented coast, a wide strip of the hinterland of the coastal-Dinaric karst of Zagora, a hilly area in the hinterland.

The landscape is diverse, and the sea is the greatest wealth and the basic natural resource that determines the economic basis. The air length of the coast is 56.2 km, and the actual length is as much as 805.9 km. The county is home to two national parks, Krka and Kornati, and the southeastern (smaller) part of the nature park Vransko jezero. The average population density is 51.5 inhabitants per km^{2}.

== Climate ==
Šibenik has a mediterranean climate (Csa), with mild, humid winters and hot, dry summers. January and February are the coldest months, July and August are the hottest months. In July the average maximum temperature is around 30 °C (86 °F). The Köppen Climate Classification subtype for this climate is "Csa" (Mediterranean Climate).

Since records began in 1949, the highest temperature recorded at the local weather station at an elevation of 77 metres (253 ft) was 39.4 °C (102.9 °F), on 10 August 2017. The coldest temperature was −11.0 °C (12.2 °F), on 10 February 1956.

Climate data for Šibenik
Month	Jan	Feb	Mar	Apr	May	Jun	Jul	Aug	Sep	Oct	Nov	Dec	Year
Record high °C (°F)	21.4 (70.5)	22.7 (72.9)	26.2 (79.2)	28.8 (83.8)	34.0 (93.2)	37.6 (99.7)	38.2 (100.8)	39.5 (103.1)	35.4 (95.7)	30.3 (86.5)	28.4 (83.1)	20.3 (68.5)	39.5 (103.1)
Daily mean °C (°F)	6.8 (44.2)	7.4 (45.3)	10.0 (50.0)	13.6 (56.5)	18.4 (65.1)	22.2 (72.0)	25.0 (77.0)	24.6 (76.3)	20.6 (69.1)	16.3 (61.3)	11.7 (53.1)	8.2 (46.8)	15.4 (59.7)
Record low °C (°F)	−10.2 (13.6)	−11.0 (12.2)	−7.5 (18.5)	−0.5 (31.1)	2.3 (36.1)	8.3 (46.9)	11.6 (52.9)	10.2 (50.4)	6.9 (44.4)	2.1 (35.8)	−6.6 (20.1)	−8.9 (16.0)	−11.0 (12.2)
Average precipitation mm (inches)	74.1 (2.92)	60.1 (2.37)	62.0 (2.44)	62.7 (2.47)	49.0 (1.93)	53.0 (2.09)	29.7 (1.17)	44.9 (1.77)	75.5 (2.97)	82.7 (3.26)	112.4 (4.43)	95.2 (3.75)	801.3 (31.57)
Average rainy days	10	9	9	10	9	8	5	5	7	9	12	12	105
Average snowy days	1	1	0	0	0	0	0	0	0	0	0	1	3
Mean monthly sunshine hours	128.6	150.6	196.1	222.4	286.3	312.1	358.0	326.0	254.3	199.7	131.0	113.8	2,678.9
Source: National Meteorological and Hydrological Service (Croatia)

== Main sights ==
Šibenik Cathedral
UNESCO World Heritage Site
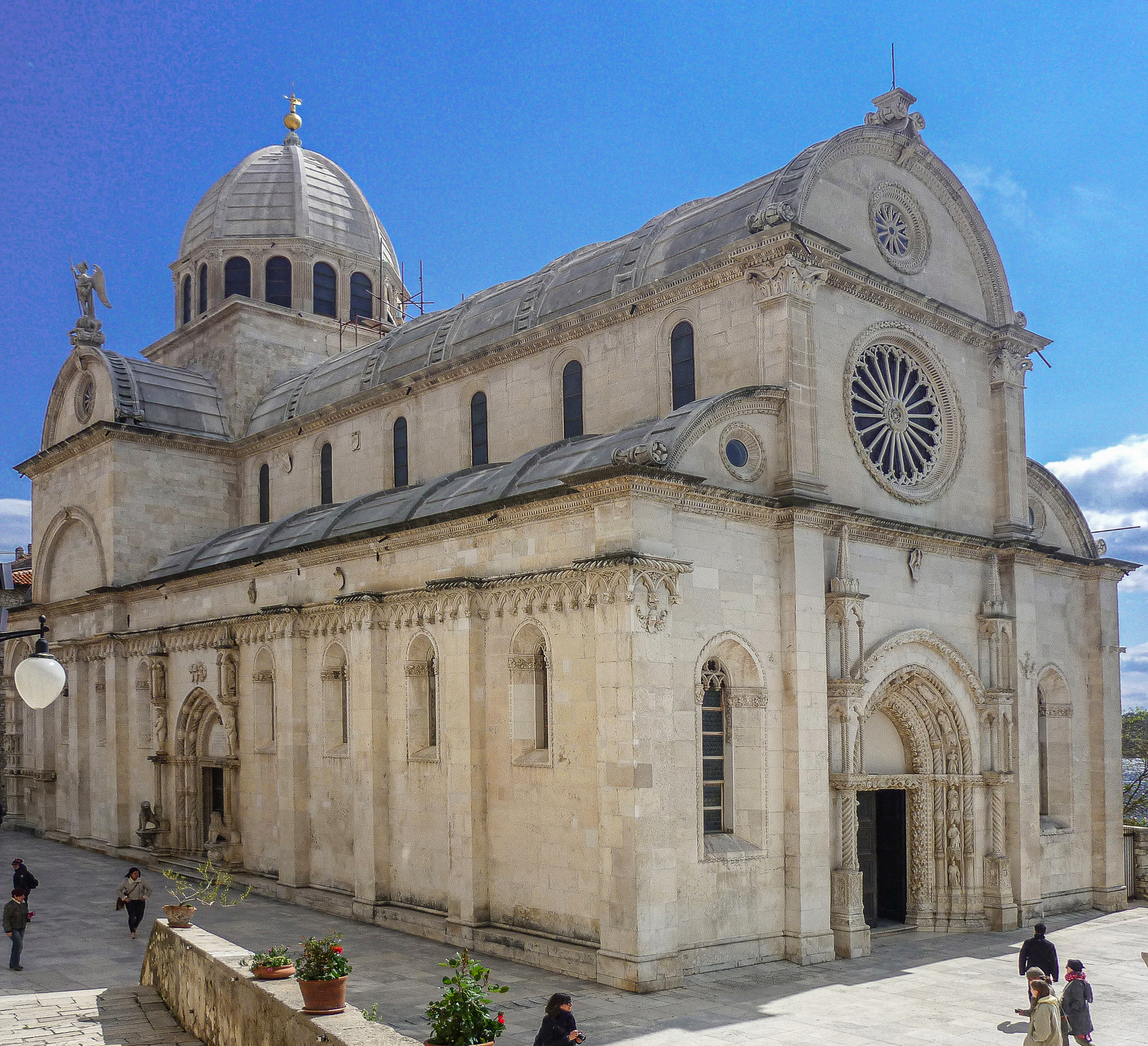
- Interactive map of Šibenik Cathedral
- Criteria: Cultural: I, II, IV,
- Reference: 963
- Inscription: 2000 (24th Session)

Šibenik is a city with 24 churches, 6 monasteries, 4 fortresses, and 2851 city steps, as well as the largest number of baroque organs. One of the major attractions is the Vrana (Vransko) Lake Nature Park, which is the largest natural lake in Croatia, with 256 species of birds. The biggest church, and the most important monument of Šibenik is Šibenik Cathedral. The Cathedral of St. James in Šibenik is a UNESCO World Heritage Site and one of the most significant monuments of Renaissance architecture in Croatia. Constructed between 1431 and 1536 entirely of stone, without the use of mortar or wood, it represents a unique structural and artistic achievement. The cathedral was designed and built by several prominent masters, most notably Juraj Dalmatinac (Giorgio da Sebenico) and Nikola Firentinac, who combined Gothic and early Renaissance elements into a harmonious whole. Its most distinctive features include the sculpted frieze of 71 human heads encircling the exterior apse, the monumental stone dome, and a richly articulated interior with barrel vaulting. The cathedral stands as an exceptional testimony to the interchange of artistic influences between northern Italy, Dalmatia, and the Adriatic cultural sphere during the 15th and 16th centuries.

Several successive architects built it completely in stone between 1431 and 1536, both in Gothic and in Renaissance style. The interlocking stone slabs of the cathedral's roof were damaged when the city was shelled by Yugoslav forces in 1991. The damage has since been repaired.

=== Fortifications in Šibenik ===
Šibenik developed an extensive fortification system from the 11th to the 17th century in response to its strategic position on the Adriatic and the threat of Ottoman expansion. For centuries, Šibenik's growth and urban form were heavily influenced by its geopolitical location — perched at a strategic coastal entry point exposed to both maritime powers and continental threats. As a result, the city became a focal point of medieval defenses, Venetian military engineering, Ottoman campaigns, and later Habsburg and modern military use. The city of Šibenik has four fortresses, each of which has views of the city, sea and nearby islands. The fortresses are now tourist sightseeing destinations.

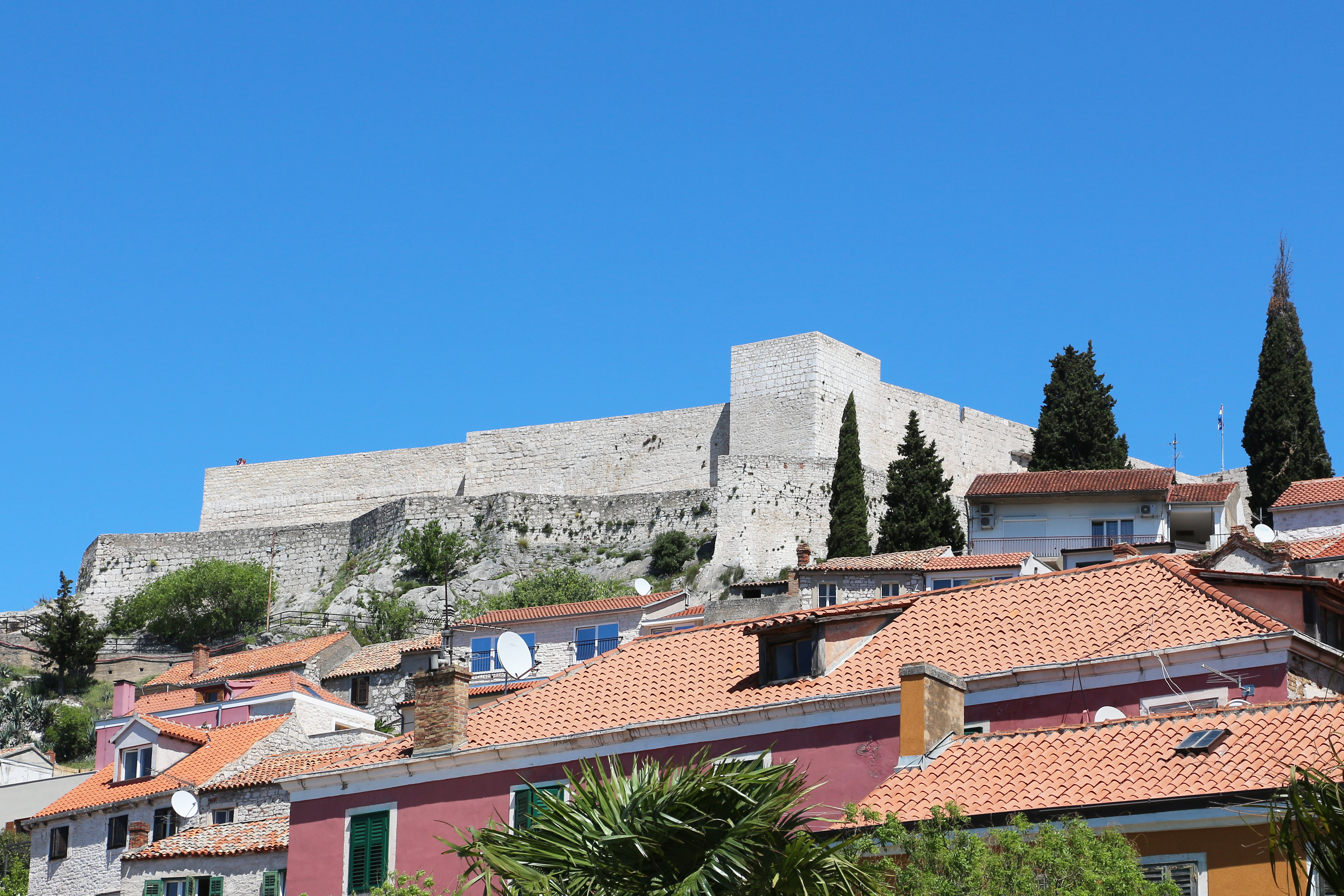
St. Michael's Fortress

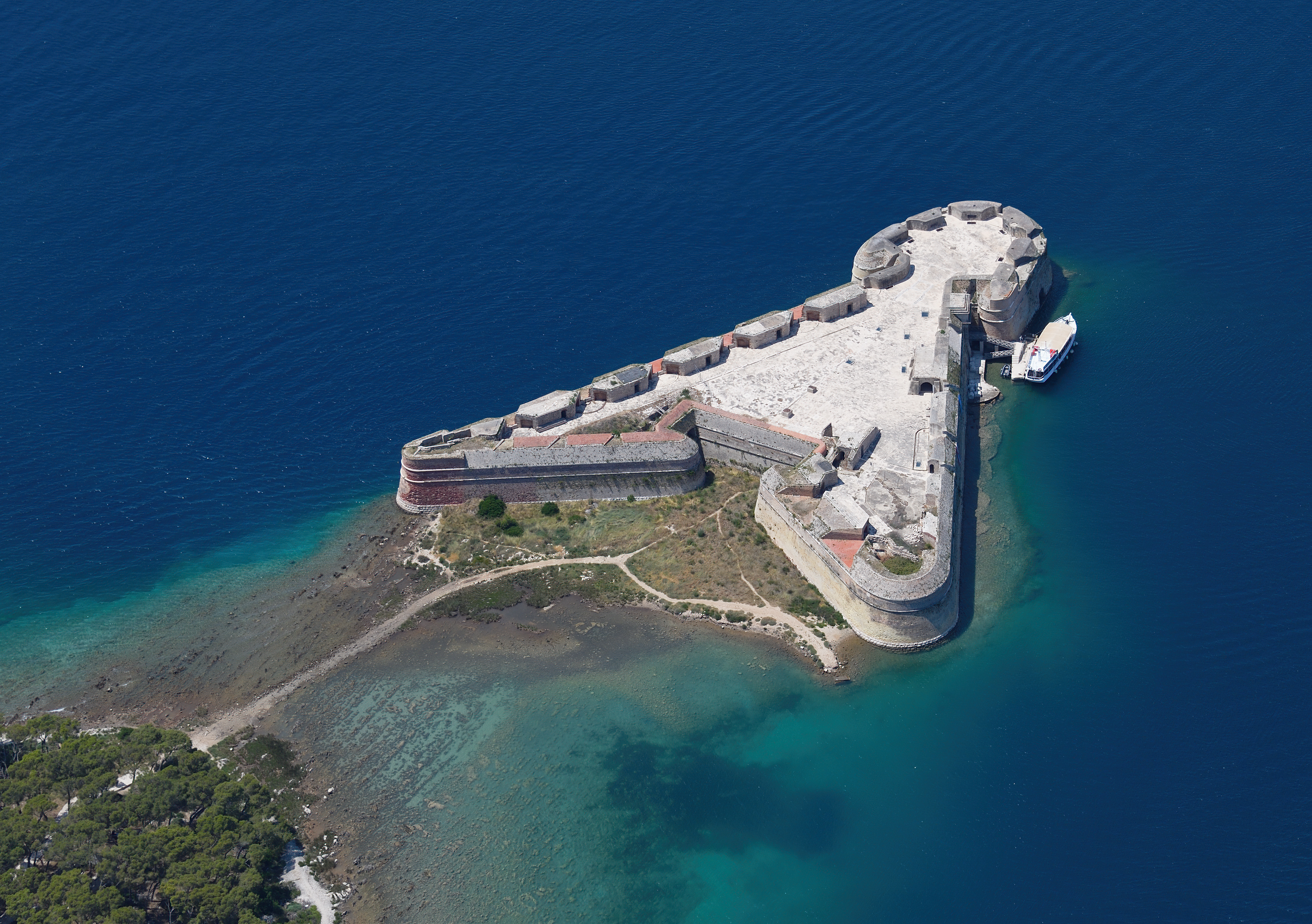
St. Nicholas Fortress

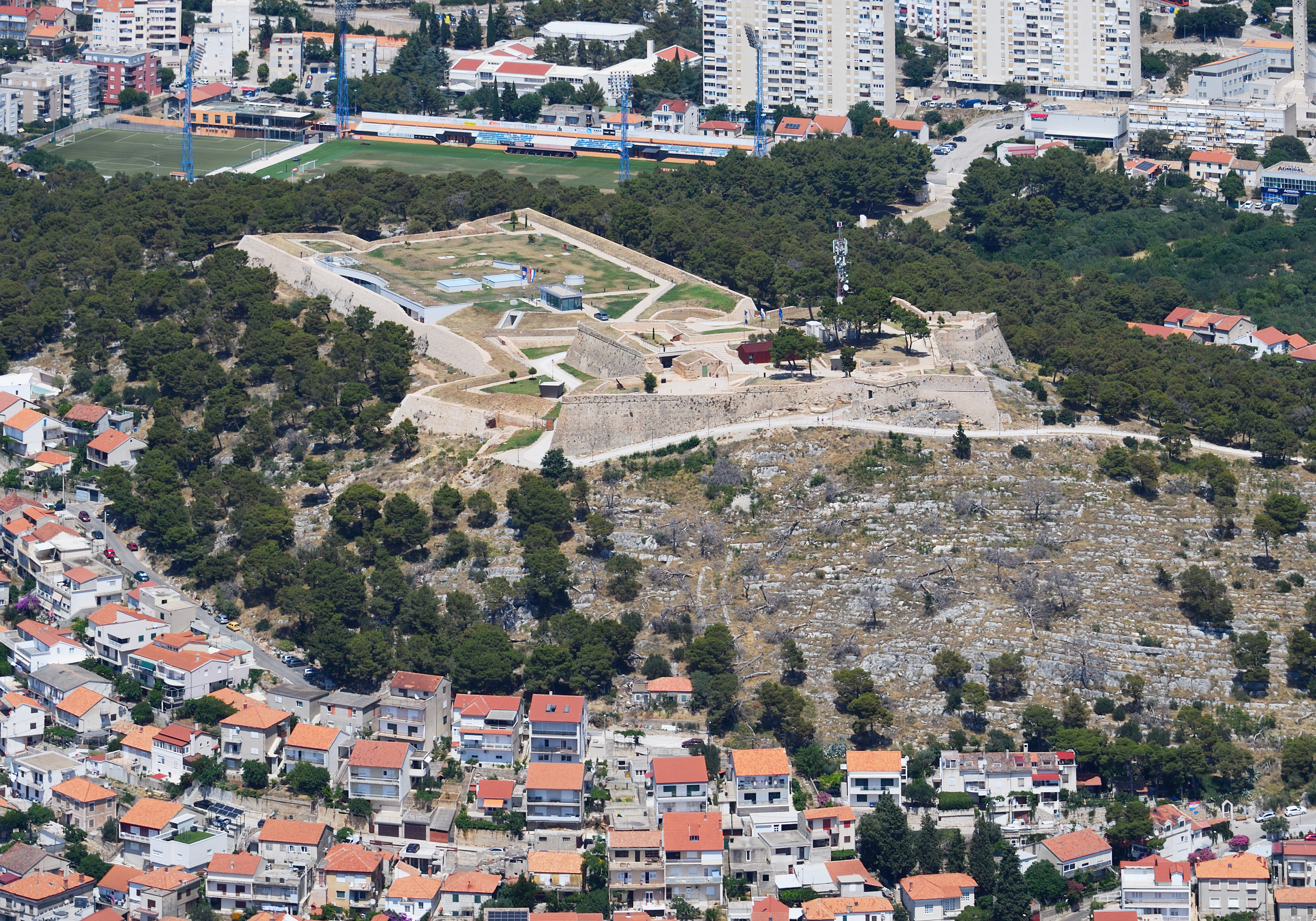
St. John's Fortress

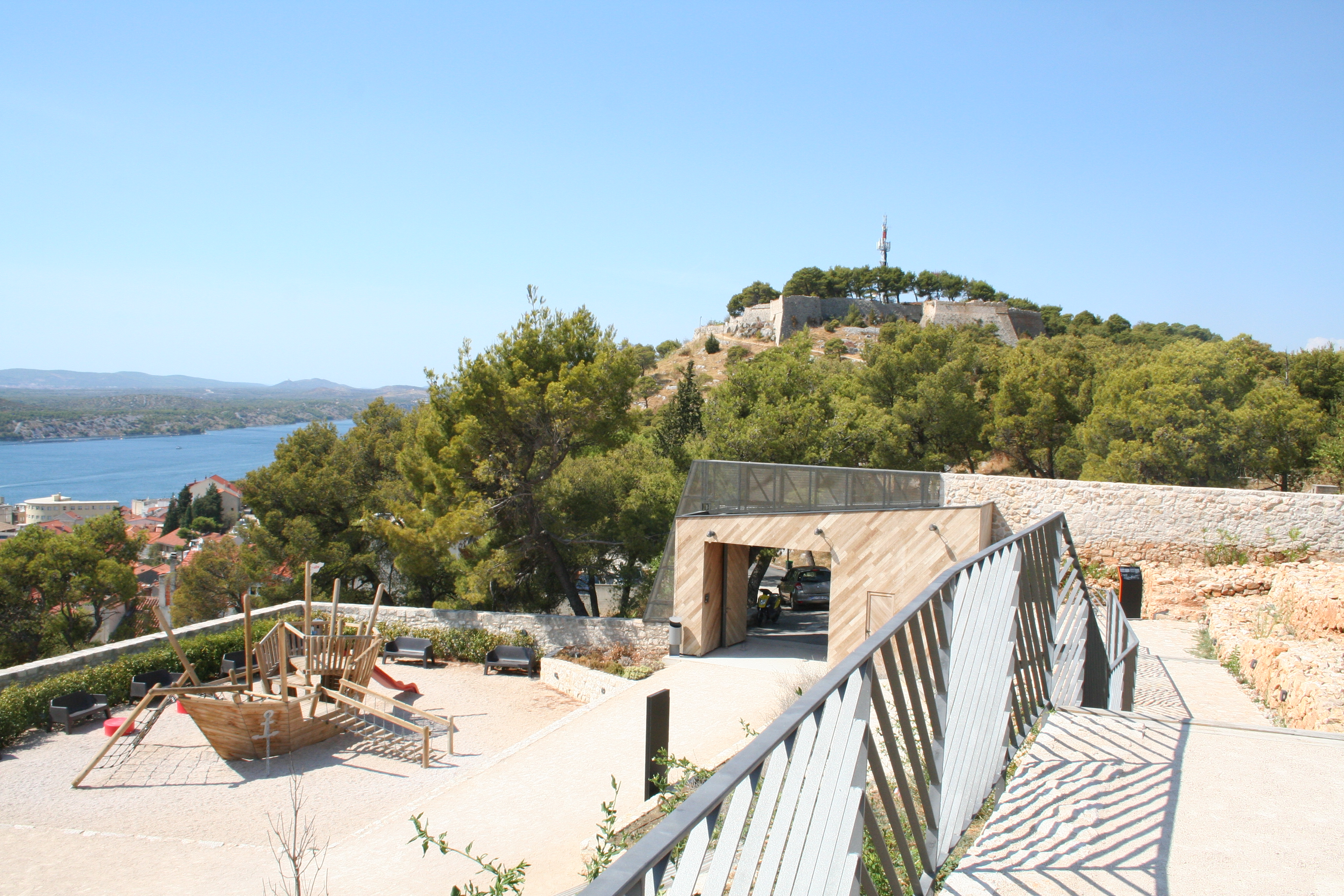
Barone Fortress

- The medieval St. Michael's Fortress (Croatian: Tvrđava Sv. Mihovila) The oldest city fortress is a major cultural and historical monument in Šibenik. This medieval stronghold represents the birthplace of the city, first mentioned in historical records in 1066, and was constructed to control and defend the Šibenik lagoon and the mouth of the Krka River. The impressive scale and strength of its fortified quadrangular layout made the fortress the dominant guardian of the surrounding area. Today, the fortress is known for open-air stage venue with 1,077 seats, which in a remarkably short time has become one of the most prestigious performance venues in the region and it has been used for performances such as: Lorde, Gregory Porter, Michael Kiwanuka, The National, Maksim Mrvica, Neno Belan and many more.
- St. Nicholas Fortress (Croatian: Tvrđava Sv. Nikole) is a fortress located on the island of Ljuljevac, at the entrance to the St. Anthony Channel, across from the Jadrija beach lighthouse. The construction of the fortress was a major undertaking, significant not only for the citizens of Šibenik but also for its rulers, as it was built to defend the city against Ottoman attacks from the sea. Erected at the entrance to a narrow channel approximately 1,500 metres long, the fortress became a key strategic defensive structure, contributing decisively to the inviolability of Šibenik's harbour and the city itself. Since the channel represented the only possible access to the Šibenik Bay, the fortress enabled effective defence and complete control over all maritime traffic entering the area. It is included in UNESCO's World Heritage Site list as part of Venetian Works of Defence between 15th and 17th centuries: Stato da Terra – western Stato da Mar in 2017.
- St. John Fortress (Croatian: Tvrđava sv. Ivana) - St. John's Fortress is located above Šibenik's historic old town, at an elevation of 115 metres above sea level. It was constructed in August and September 1646, in 58 days, as the central element of a newly established defensive system, built in anticipation of a major Ottoman military attack. The fortress was erected by the citizens of Šibenik using their own labour and resources, following the plans of the Genoese engineer Fra Antonio Leni. Designed as a star-shaped fortification, the structure has undergone multiple reconstructions and reinforcements throughout its history. In recent times, it also gained international recognition as a filming location for the globally popular television series Game of Thrones.
- Barone Fortress (Croatian: Tvrđava Barone) - Barone Fortress, situated 90 metres above sea level on a hill formerly known as Vidakuša, is one of the three land fortifications that protected Šibenik from enemy attacks. In the mid-17th century, deteriorating relations between the Ottoman Empire and Venice, coupled with the outbreak of the Cretan War, brought opposing forces close to Šibenik. In response, the citizens—united in solidarity—built this fortress in 58 days. Shortly after its completion, the city faced the largest assault in its history, when Bosnian Pasha Tekijeli arrived with an army of 25,000 to 30,000 soldiers. The citizens of Šibenik successfully defended the city, with Barone Fortress playing a crucial role in securing this historic victory.

=== Natural heritage ===
- Roughly 18 kilometres (11 mi) north of the city is the Krka National Park, similar to the Plitvice Lakes National Park, known for its many waterfalls, flora, fauna, and historical and archaeological remains.
- The Kornati archipelago, west of Šibenik, consists of 150 islands in a sea area of about 320 km^{2} (124 sq mi), making it the densest archipelago in the Mediterranean Sea.

== Culture ==
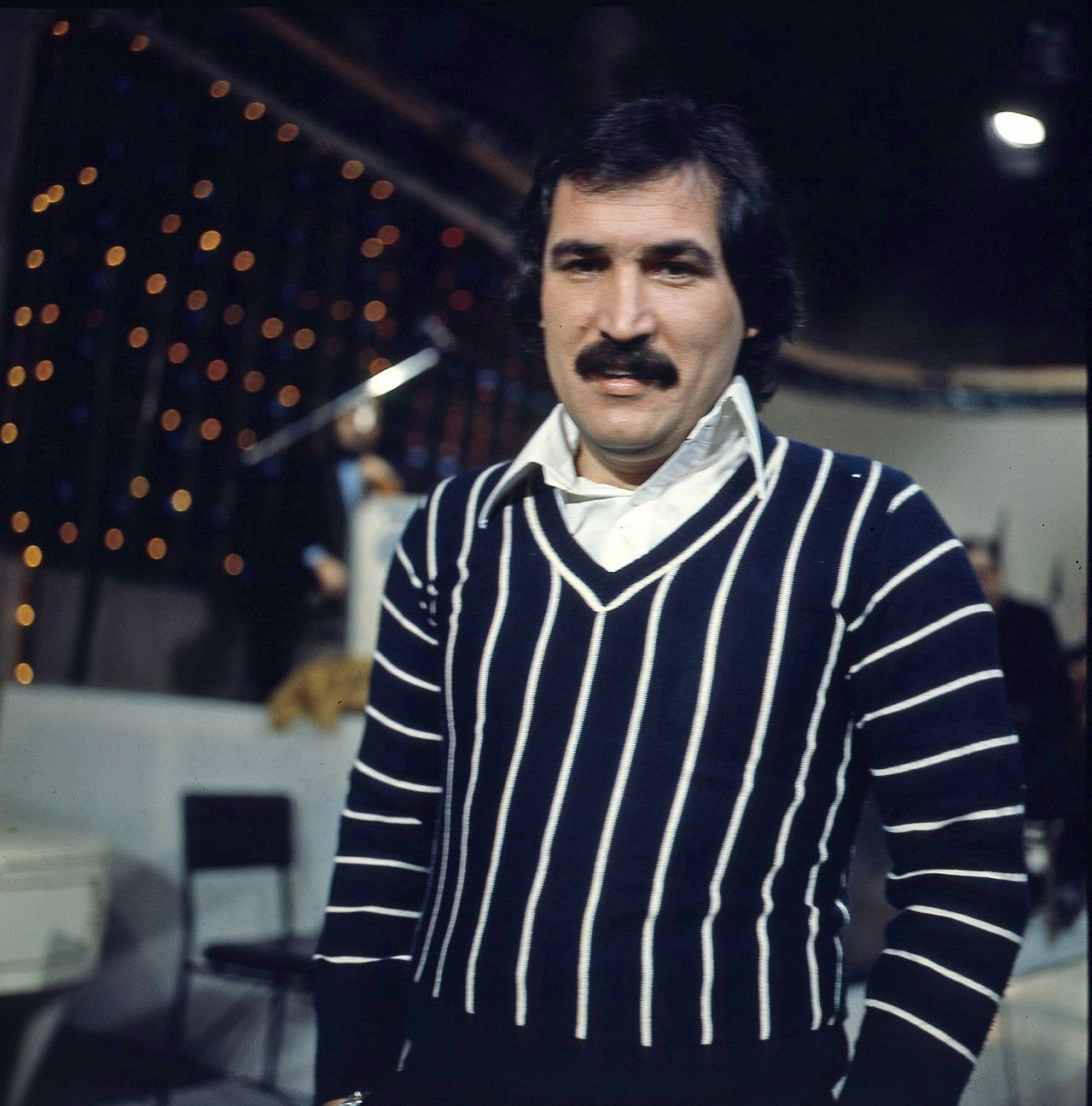
Mišo Kovač is a legendary Croatian pop singer and the artist with the most sold albums in the history of Croatian entertainment, with over 20 million records sold.

The culture of Šibenik is deeply connected to its rich history, Adriatic traditions, and artistic heritage. As one of the oldest native Croatian towns on the coast, Šibenik is known for its medieval architecture, narrow stone streets, and lively cultural scene.

Throughout the year, Šibenik hosts important cultural events such as the International Children’s Festival, which attracts performers and visitors from around the world, and various summer music festivals held in the city’s historic fortresses. Šibenik is also known for producing notable people, including the famous basketball player Dražen Petrović, often regarded as one of Europe’s greatest athletes, and inventor Faust Vrančić, who designed one of the earliest parachute concepts.

The composer Jakov Gotovac founded the city's "Philharmonia Society" in 1922. The 19th-century composer Franz von Suppé was part of the city's cultural fabric, as he was a native of nearby Split. Mišo Kovač, popular Croatian singer, Vice Vukov, singer and politician, and Arsen Dedić, singer and poet, were born in Šibenik.

Each summer, a number of concerts and events take place in the city, many of them in the St. Michael's Fortress. Also, starting in 2016 on a nearby island of Obonjan (6 kilometres (3.7 miles) southwest of the city), an annual music, art, health and workshop festival is being held.

The annual Šibenik International Children's Festival (Međunarodni Dječji Festival) takes place every summer and hosts children's workshops, plays and other activities. From 2011 to 2013 the Terraneo festival (music festival) was held in August on a yearly basis on a former military area in Šibenik, and since 2014 Šibenik (and other nearby towns) are the home of its spiritual successor Super Uho festival. Šibenik hosts the Dalmatian Chanson Evenings festival (Večeri Dalmatinske Šansone), held in the second half of August.

=== Sports ===
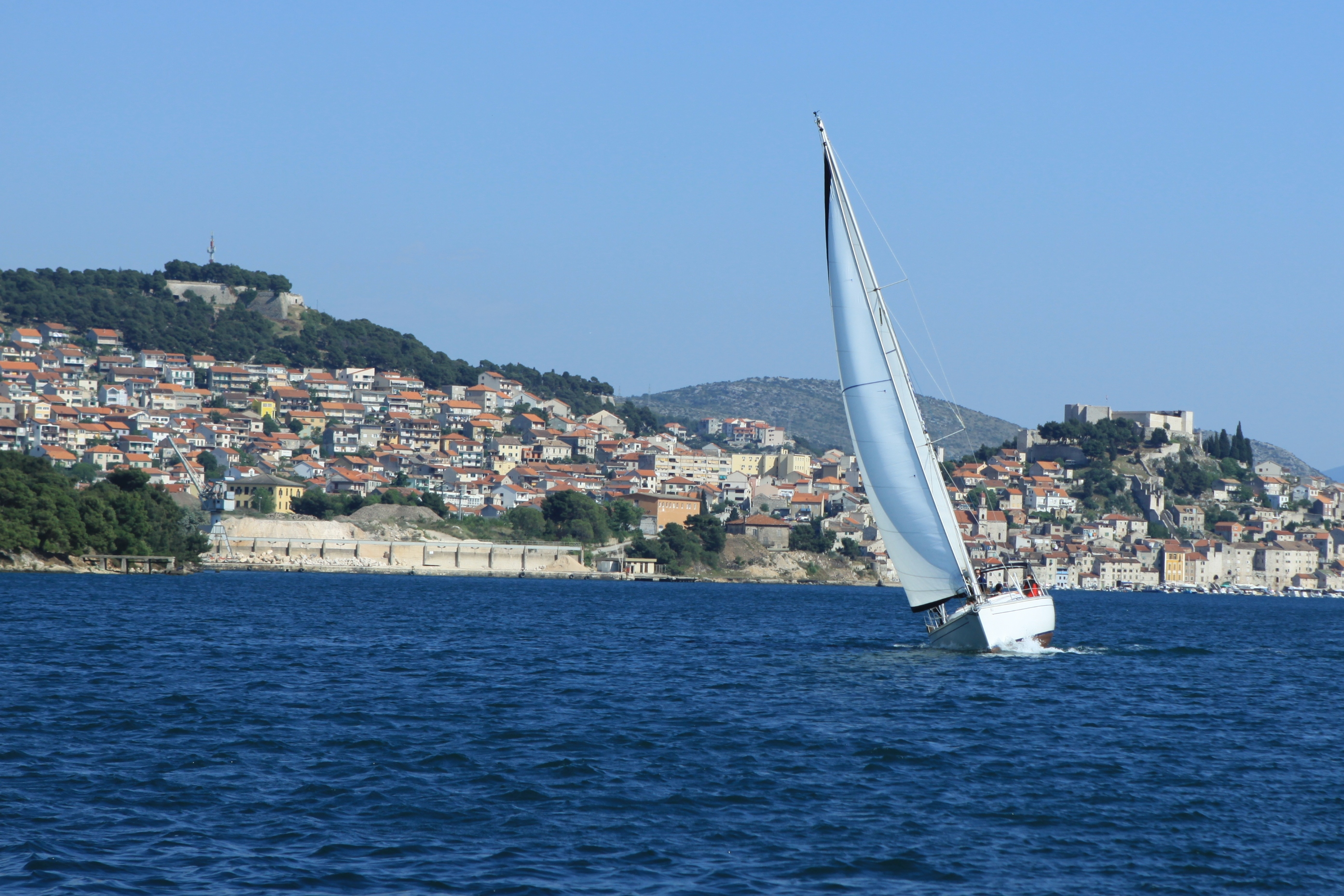
Sailing

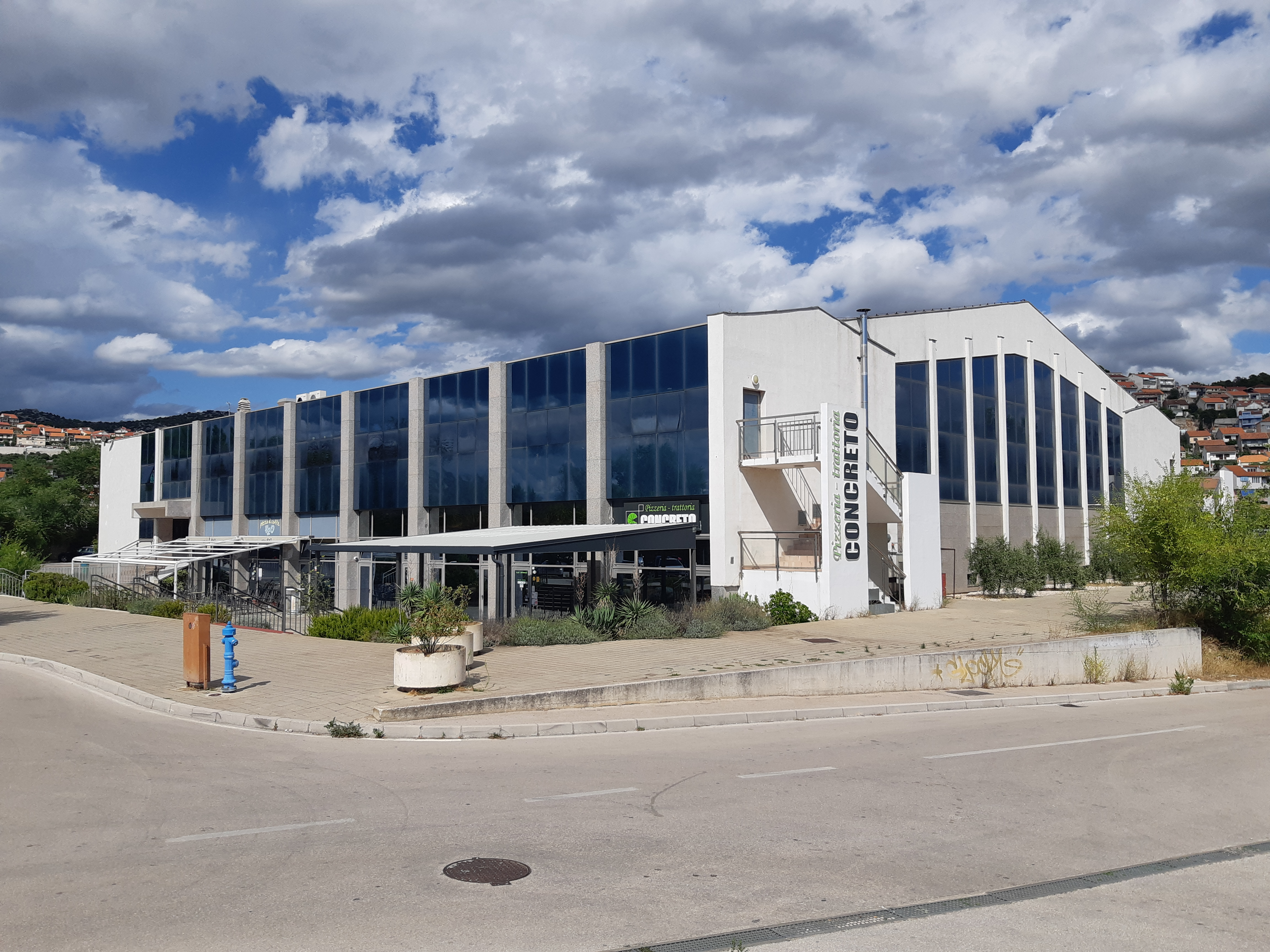
Swimming pool Crnica

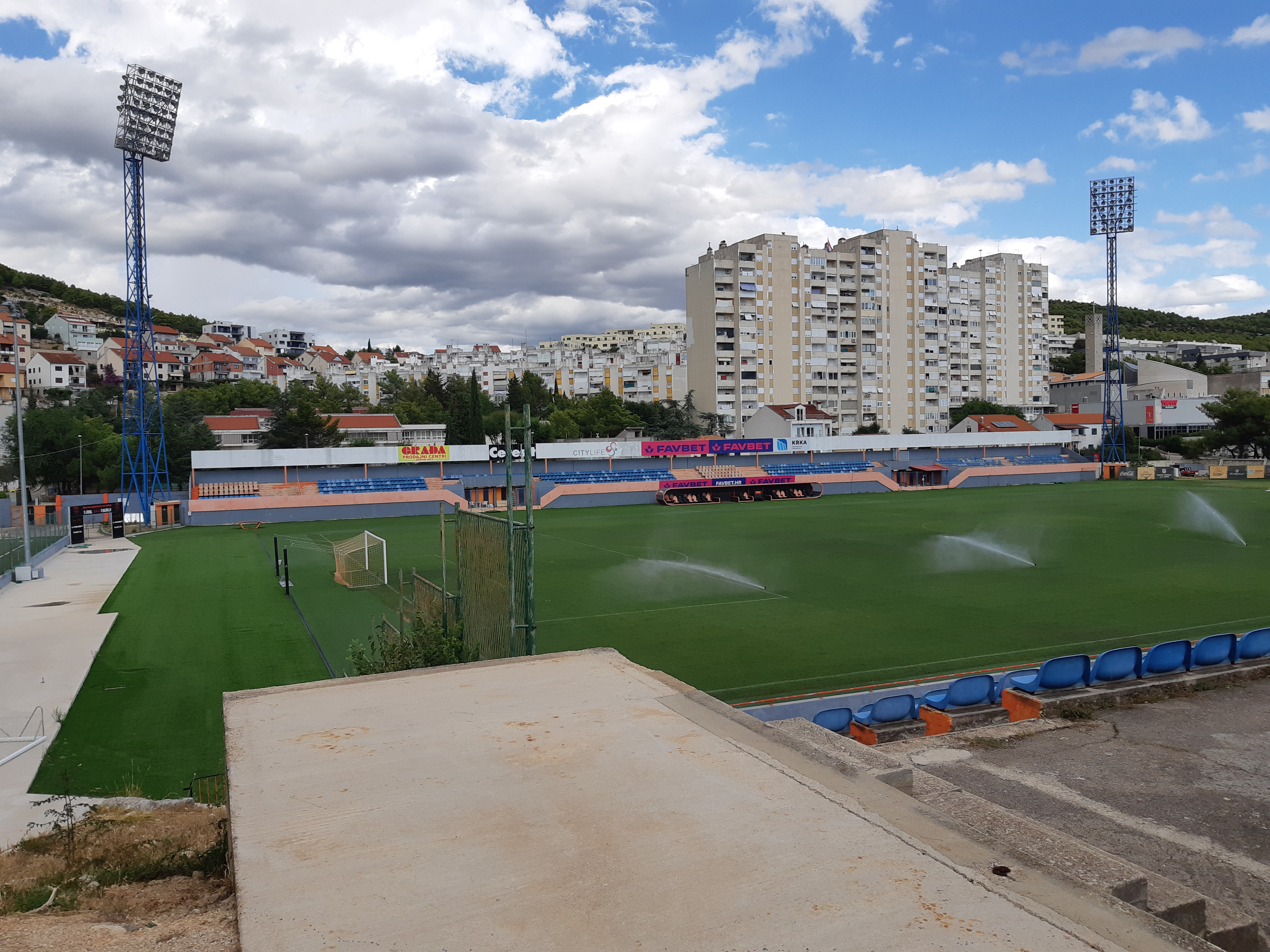
Stadion Šubićevac

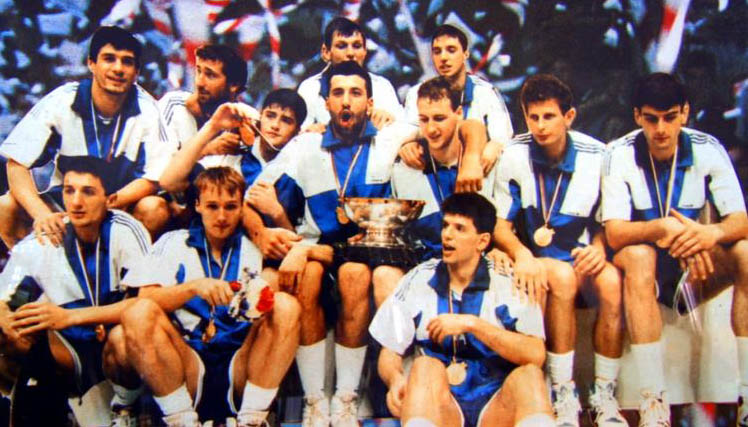
Dražen Petrović (upfront) celebrating with Yugoslavia after winning the EuroBasket 1989;

Šibenik is the hometown of many athletes: Aleksandar Petrović, Dražen Petrović, Ognjen Cvitan, Perica Bukić, Ivica Žurić, Predrag Šarić, Dario Šarić, Vanda Baranović-Urukalo, Danira Nakić, Nik Slavica, Miro Bilan, Dražan Jerković, Petar Nadoveza, Krasnodar Rora, Dean Računica, Mladen Pralija, Ante Rukavina, Duje Ćaleta-Car, Mile Nakić, Franko Nakić, Siniša Belamarić, Renato Vrbičić, Ivica Tucak, Andrija Komadina, Miro Jurić, Antonio Petković, Neven Spahija, Antonija Sandrić, Mate Maleš, Stipe Bralić, Franco Jelovčić, Nives Radić, Karmela Makelja, and many others.

==== Basketball ====
The famous multi-purpose Baldekin Sports Hall was the home arena of KK Šibenik, the famous basketball club which played in the final of the FIBA Korać Cup twice, as well as in the final of the 1982–83 Yugoslav league championship. The team was led by then 19-year-old Dražen Petrović.

The women's basketball club, ŽKK Šibenik, is among the most successful women's basketball clubs in Croatia, winning the Yugoslav league title in 1991, Yugoslav Cup title twice, Croatian league title four times, Croatian Cup four times, Adriatic league five times, and the Vojko Herksel Cup four times.

The dissolved men's basketball club, Jolly Jadranska banka, played in the play-offs semifinals of the Croatian league championship twice, as well as in the Krešimir Ćosić Cup final game in the 2016–17 season.

The biggest success of GKK Šibenka, a club founded in 2010 following the dissolution of the famous KK Šibenik, came in the 2016–17 Croatian league championship season, when the club played the play-offs semifinals against powerhouse Cibona Zagreb. Šibenka lost to Cibona in the semifinals.

==== Football ====
Šubićevac stadium, which is located in the neighbourhood of the same name, has been the home ground of the HNK Šibenik football club, which had played many years in the Yugoslav Second League, and later many years in the Croatian First League. In the 2009–10 season, the club played in the Croatian Cup final, which they lost to powerhouse Hajduk Split. As of 2021, the club again competes in the Croatian First League.

In May 2026, HNK Šibenik was dissolved, and in June the same year, a new football club, GNK Šibenik, was founded.

==== Mountaineering ====
The local chapter of the HPS, HPD "Kamenar", was in renewal in 1937.

==== Water polo ====
The dissolved water polo club, VK Šibenik, is considered to be one of the best men's clubs in former Yugoslavia, winning the second place in the 1986–87 domestic league season. It also played in the LEN Euro Cup final game of the 2006–07 season, but lost to Sintez Kazan, as well as the club played in the LEN Champions League in the 2008–09 season, led both times by Ivica Tucak, today the head coach of the senior men's Croatian national team.

Croatian water polo internationals, Perica Bukić and Renato Vrbičić, are Olympic medalists. They won gold medals at the 1996 Summer Olympics in Atlanta. Ivica Tucak has been the most successful coach of the senior men's Croatian national team ever.

== Demographics ==
Historical population
Year	Pop.	±%
1857	15,269	—
1869	17,245	+12.9%
1880	17,908	+3.8%
1890	19,572	+9.3%
1900	23,528	+20.2%
1910	28,514	+21.2%
1921	31,735	+11.3%
1931	34,952	+10.1%
1948	33,343	−4.6%
1953	37,161	+11.5%
1961	44,440	+19.6%
1971	47,122	+6.0%
1981	51,445	+9.2%
1991	55,842	+8.5%
2001	51,553	−7.7%
2011	46,332	−10.1%
2021	42,599	−8.1%
Source: Naselja i stanovništvo Republike Hrvatske 1857–2021, DZS

In the 2021 Croatian census, Šibenik's total city population was 42,599 which makes it the eleventh-largest city in Croatia, with 31,115 in the urban settlement.

Of Šibenik's citizens, 94.19% were ethnic Croats.

The administrative sections of the city are:

- Baldekin I
- Baldekin II - Škopinac
- Baldekin III
- Crnica
- Građa
- Jadrija
- Mandalina
- Meterize
- Plišac
- Ražine
- Ražine Donje
- Stari Grad
- Šubićevac
- Varoš
- Vidici
- Zablaće

The list of settlements is as follows:

- Boraja, population 221
- Brnjica, population 57
- Brodarica, population 2,611
- Čvrljevo, population 51
- Danilo, population 319
- Danilo Biranj, population 416
- Danilo Kraljice, population 87
- Donje Polje, population 188
- Dubrava kod Šibenika, population 1,117
- Goriš, population 127
- Gradina, population 258
- Grebaštica, population 890
- Jadrtovac, population 171
- Kaprije, population 186
- Konjevrate, population 179
- Krapanj, population 166
- Lepenica, population 62
- Lozovac, population 318
- Mravnica, population 29
- Perković, population 103
- Podine, population 20
- Radonić, population 93
- Raslina, population 553
- Sitno Donje, population 457
- Slivno, population 95
- Šibenik, population 31,115
- Vrpolje, population 731
- Vrsno, population 58
- Zaton, population 929
- Zlarin, population 293
- Žaborić, population 552
- Žirje, population 147
City of Šibenik: Population trends 1857–2021
v

population	15269	17245	17908	19572	23528	28514	31735	34952	33343	37161	44440	47122	51445	55842	51553	46332	42599
	1857	1869	1880	1890	1900	1910	1921	1931	1948	1953	1961	1971	1981	1991	2001	2011	2021

Sources: Croatian Bureau of Statistics publications

Throughout history, there was a significant Italian-speaking community in Šibenik. According to the Austrian censuses, there were 1,018 residents of the central settlement that used Italian as their habitual language (14.5% of the total population) in 1890, and 810 (6.4%) in 1910. The commune as a whole had 1,090 (5.3%) Italian speakers in 1890, and 836 (2.8%) in 1910. In 2011, only 16 people declared themselves as Italians, corresponding to 0.03% of the total population.

== Economy ==
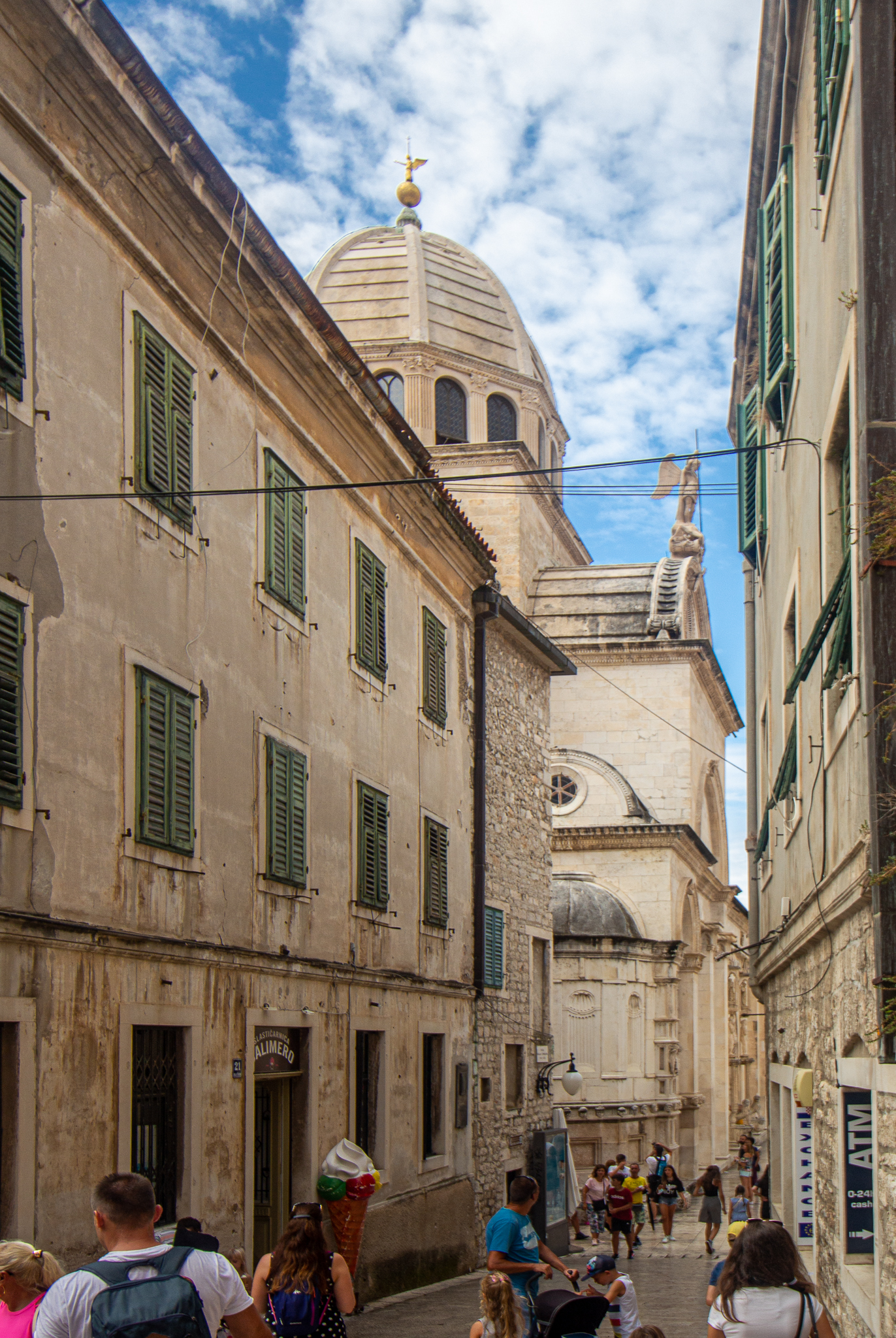
Šibenik Cathedral seen from narrow streets of Šibenik's old town, the cities most prominent landmark

In the mid-19th and early 20th centuries, Šibenik was one of the most important economic centers of southern Croatia, and was economically significant in the trade, crafts and industry of Dalmatia. It was greatly helped by the transport connection with Lika and part of Bosnia and Herzegovina, and due to the aforementioned transport connection, it was the main export port for wood and ores. Although part of the population was employed in the aforementioned economic branches, agriculture was still the main economic branch. They were mainly engaged in grape growing, olive growing and gardening.

According to the data of the Croatian Chamber of Economy, in the city of Šibenik in 2010, a total of 838 companies were registered, of which 3 were large, 12 medium-sized, and 823 small. Of the total number, 799 were limited liability companies, 16 joint-stock companies, 14 institutions, 8 public companies, and 1 company with a foreign founder. According to the Central Trades Register, in 2010, there were 1,321 registered tradesmen in Šibenik. According to the Register of Associations, in 2010, there were 445 registered associations with headquarters in the City of Šibenik.

Today, Šibenik is the capital, cultural, educational, administrative and economic center of the Šibensko-kninska županija, which has 46,332 inhabitants (2011, including suburban settlements). Until the 1980s, Šibenik was a strong industrial center (factories "TEF" and "TLM"), the Šibenik port was among the largest in the former Yugoslavia, but an economic decline occurred, and in the 1990s, TEF ceased operations (the factory was removed), and TLM, which was significantly damaged in the Greater Serbian aggression, significantly reduced production capacities.

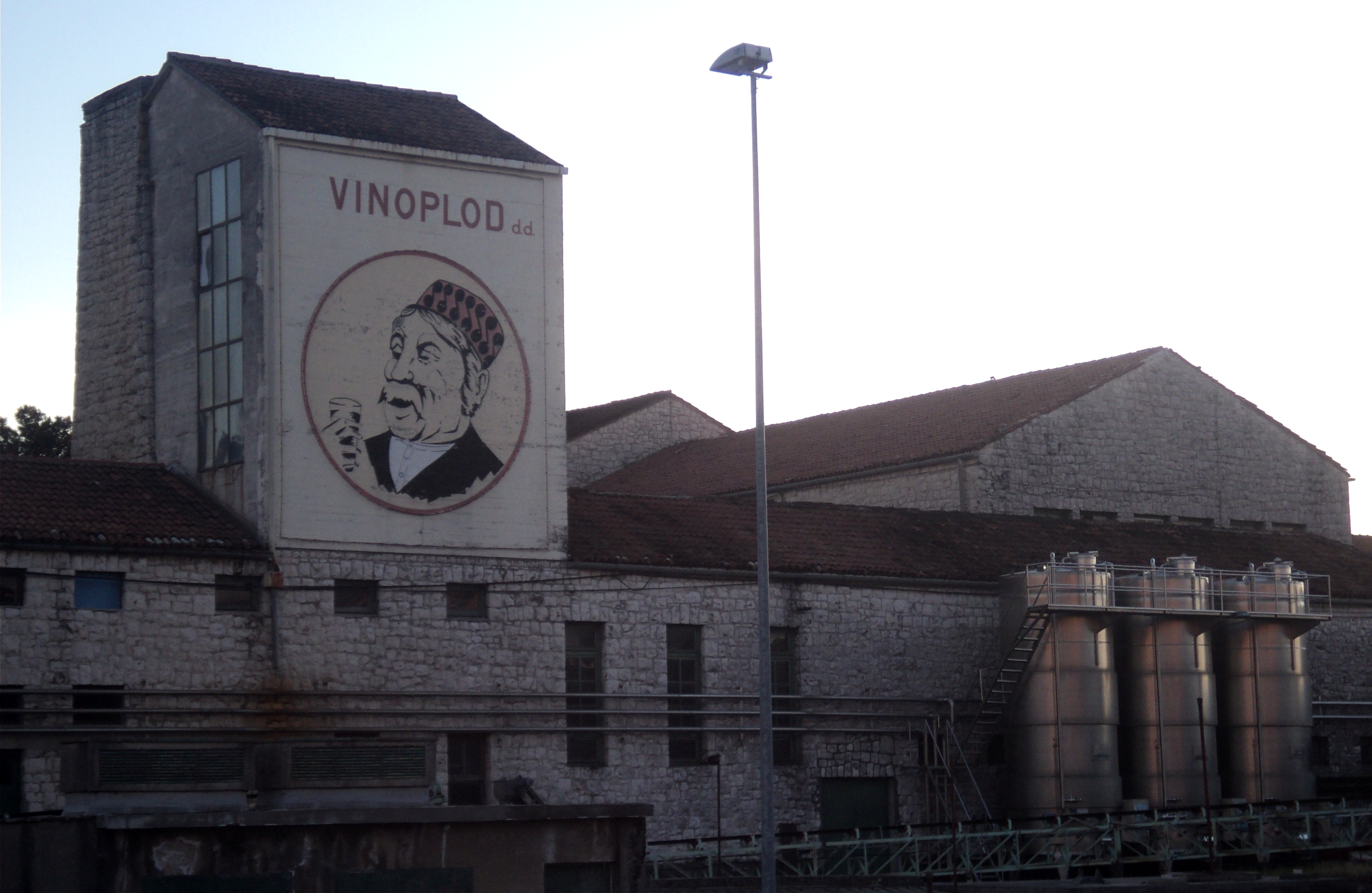
Vinoplod winery Šibenik

=== Šibenik Port ===
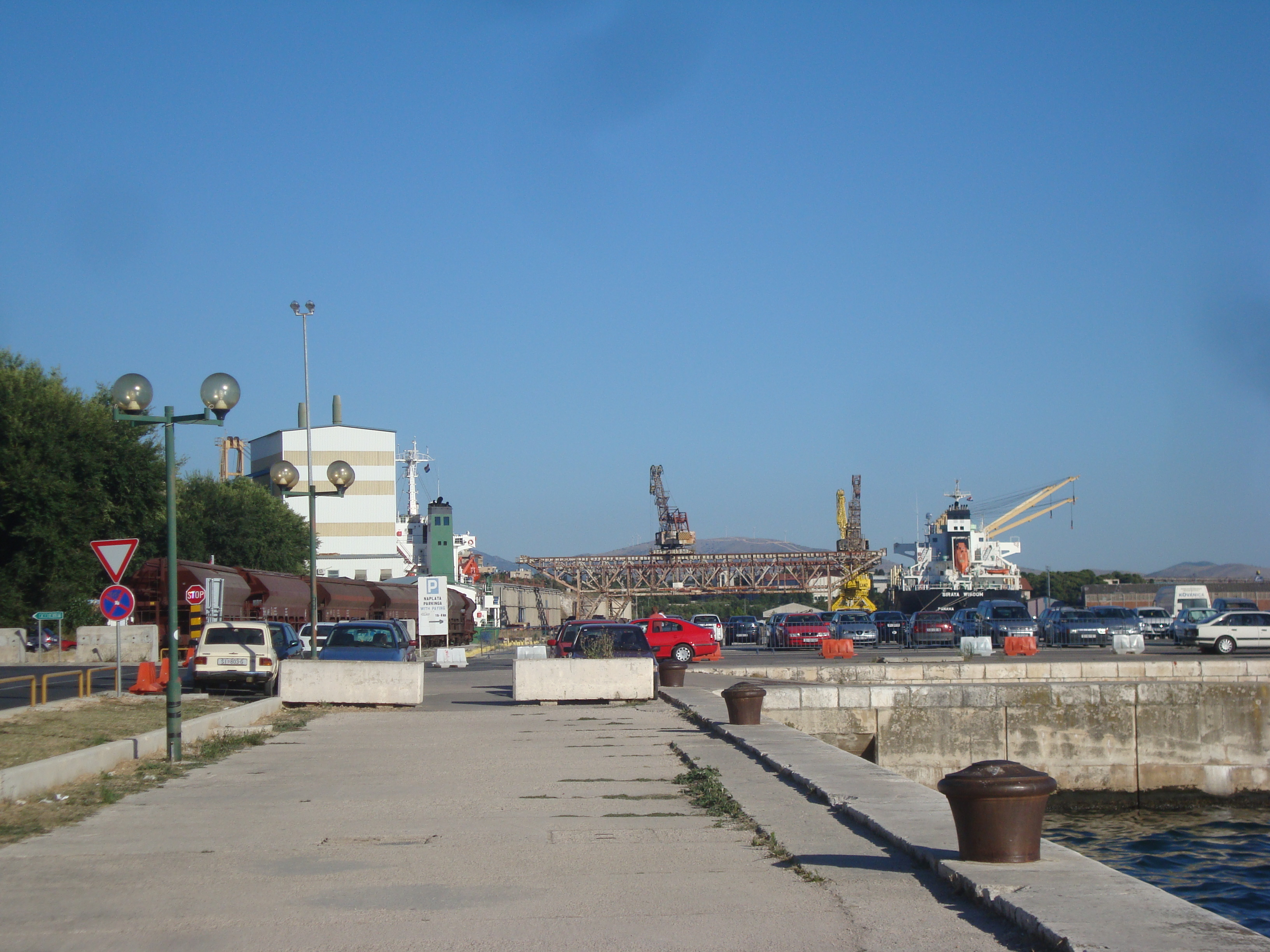
Šibenik Port

The Šibenik Port had an important influence on the development of the economy in the city of Šibenik. During the Austro-Hungarian rule, the Šibenik Port was the third most important port (right after Trieste and Fiumme). At that time, the city of Šibenik and its port played an extremely important role as indispensable urban and port environments in the process of socio-economic integration of the Adriatic region on the one hand, as well as connecting that region with the Balkan hinterland on the other.

Šibenik is one of the best protected ports on the Croatian Adriatic and is situated on the estuary of the Krka River. The approach channel is navigable by ships up to 50,000 tonnes deadweight. The port itself has depths up to 40 m.

The city of Šibenik has started the construction and expansion of the port. According to the idea of the architect Puljiz, on the space of 44,000 square meters, where the terminal will be located, a cruise ship of up to 260 meters, a large ferry of 180 meters, and two liners of 60 meters each will be able to dock at the same time. The terminal would be environmentally friendly and would use thermal pumps immersed in the sea for heating and cooling, and with solar collectors that would be integrated into the roof structure, the terminal would thus provide up to 40 percent of its energy needs. The total investment amounts to 24 million euros, and the completion of the works is expected by 2014 or 2015.

== Transportation ==
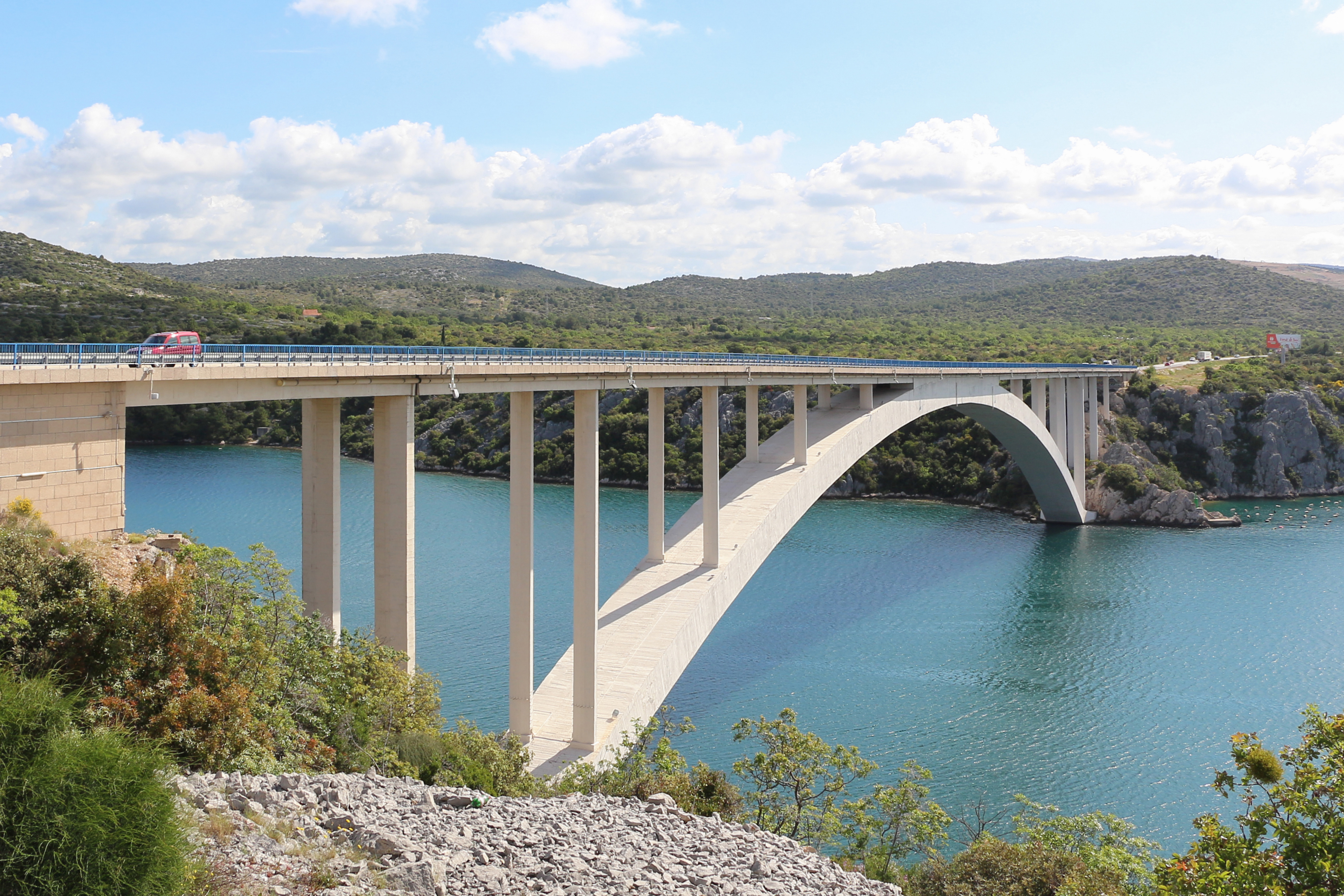
Šibenik Bridge

=== Railways ===
Šibenik has a railway station which is a terminus of the local Perković - Šibenik railway, a branch of the M604 railway connecting Zagreb and Split via Knin. The train services are operated by Croatian Railways.

=== Busses ===
Šibenik bus station is connected by daily bus lines with the surrounding towns such as Vodice, Pirovac, and Biograd na Moru. There are good connections to major cities across Croatia, including Rijeka, Crikvenica, Zagreb, Osijek, Zadar, Split, Makarska, and Dubrovnik.

=== By air ===
Šibenik does not have an airport, instead, air traffic is done through either Split Airport (50 km from Šibenik) or Zadar Airport (70 km from Šibenik), although Šibenik-Pokrovnik Airport ("Zračna luka Srce Dalmacije") has been officially planned and approved by the Government of Croatia.

=== Ferries ===
Šibenik is connected to the Šibenik islands (Prvić, Zlarin, Žirje, Kaprije, Obonjan) by ferry connections.

== International relations ==
Šibenik is twinned with:

- (Italy) Civitanova Marche (since 2002)
- (Italy) San Benedetto del Tronto
- (Germany) Kreis Herford
- (France) Voiron
- (Croatia) Vukovar (since 2011)
- (Italy) Pineto (since 2016)
- (Bulgaria) Razlog (since 2016)
- (Hungary) Veszprém

== Image gallery ==
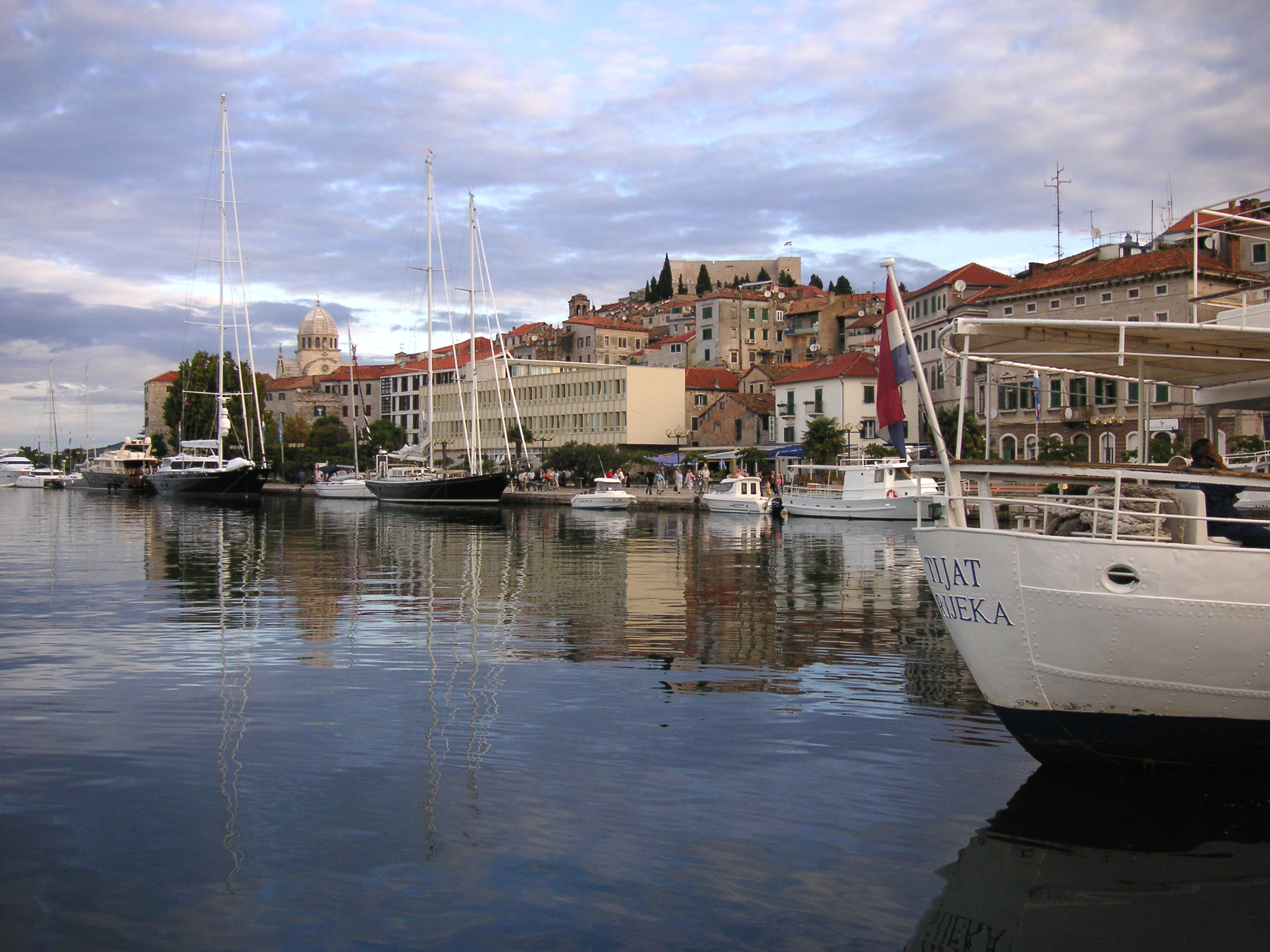
Šibenik harbor

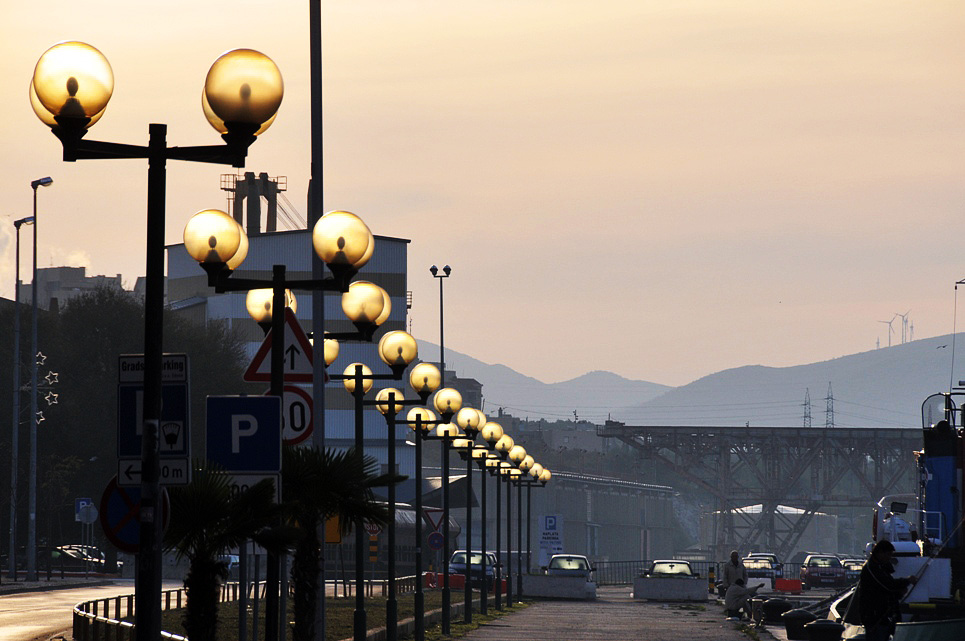
Sunrise in Šibenik

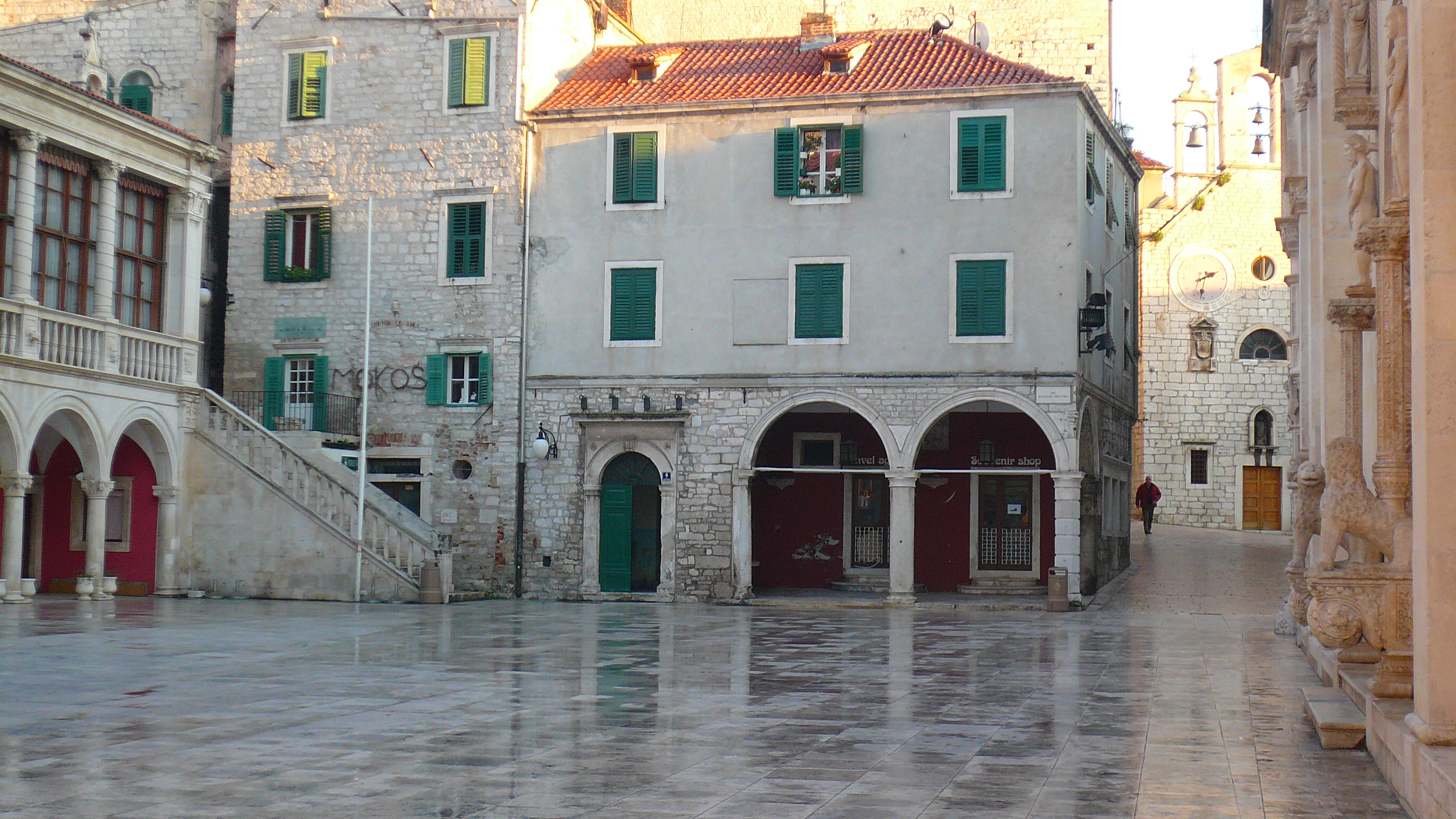
Square of the Republic of Croatia

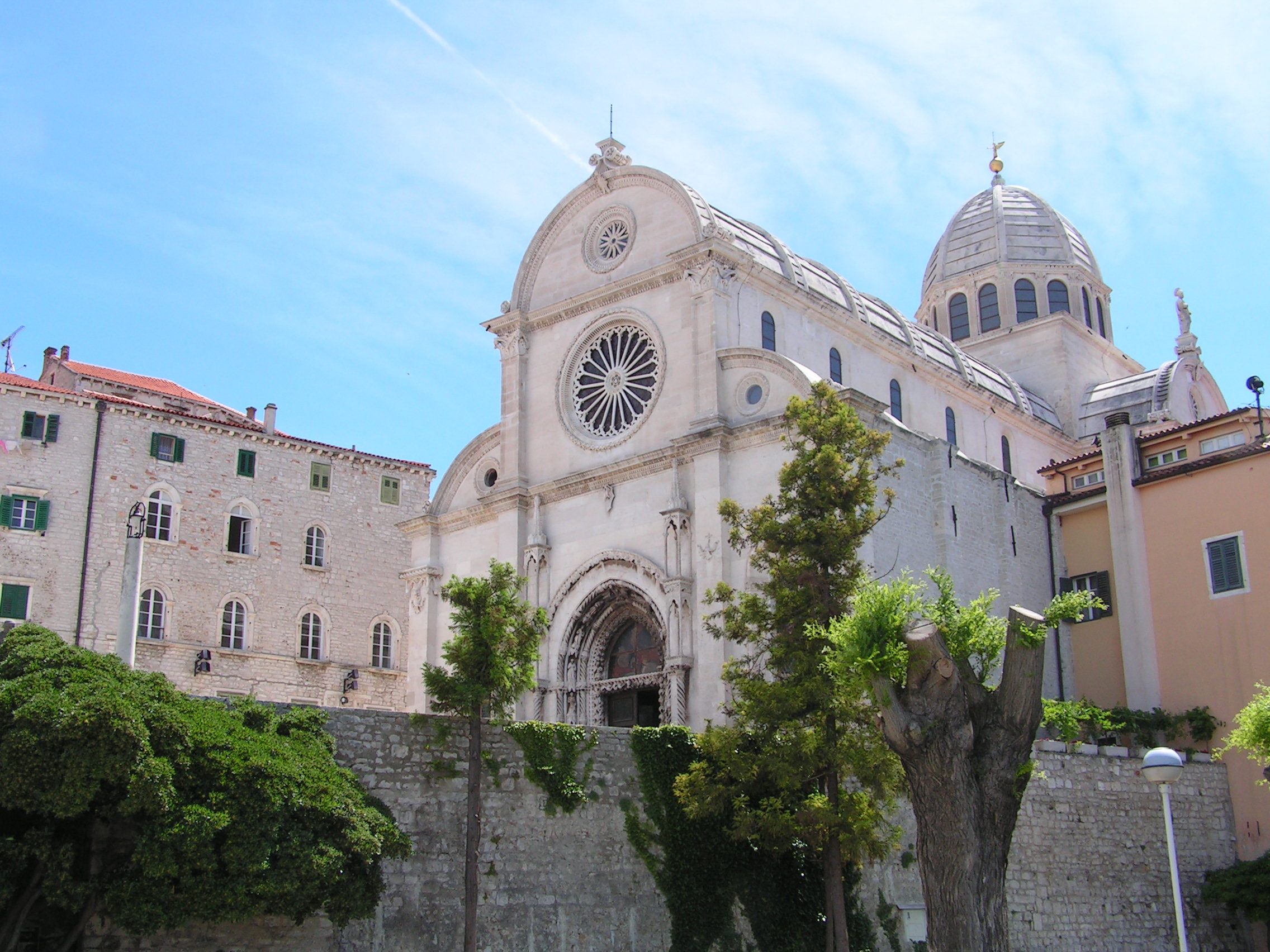
Šibenik Cathedral

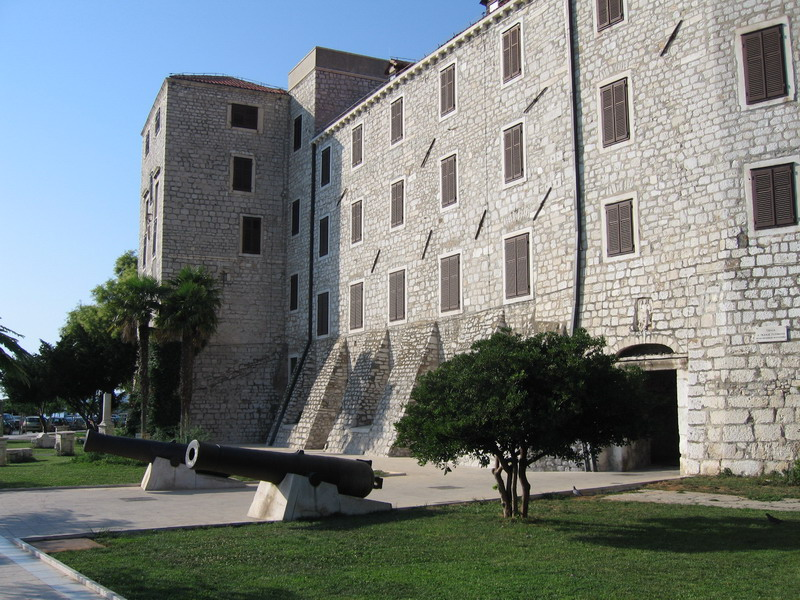
Cannons in Šibenik

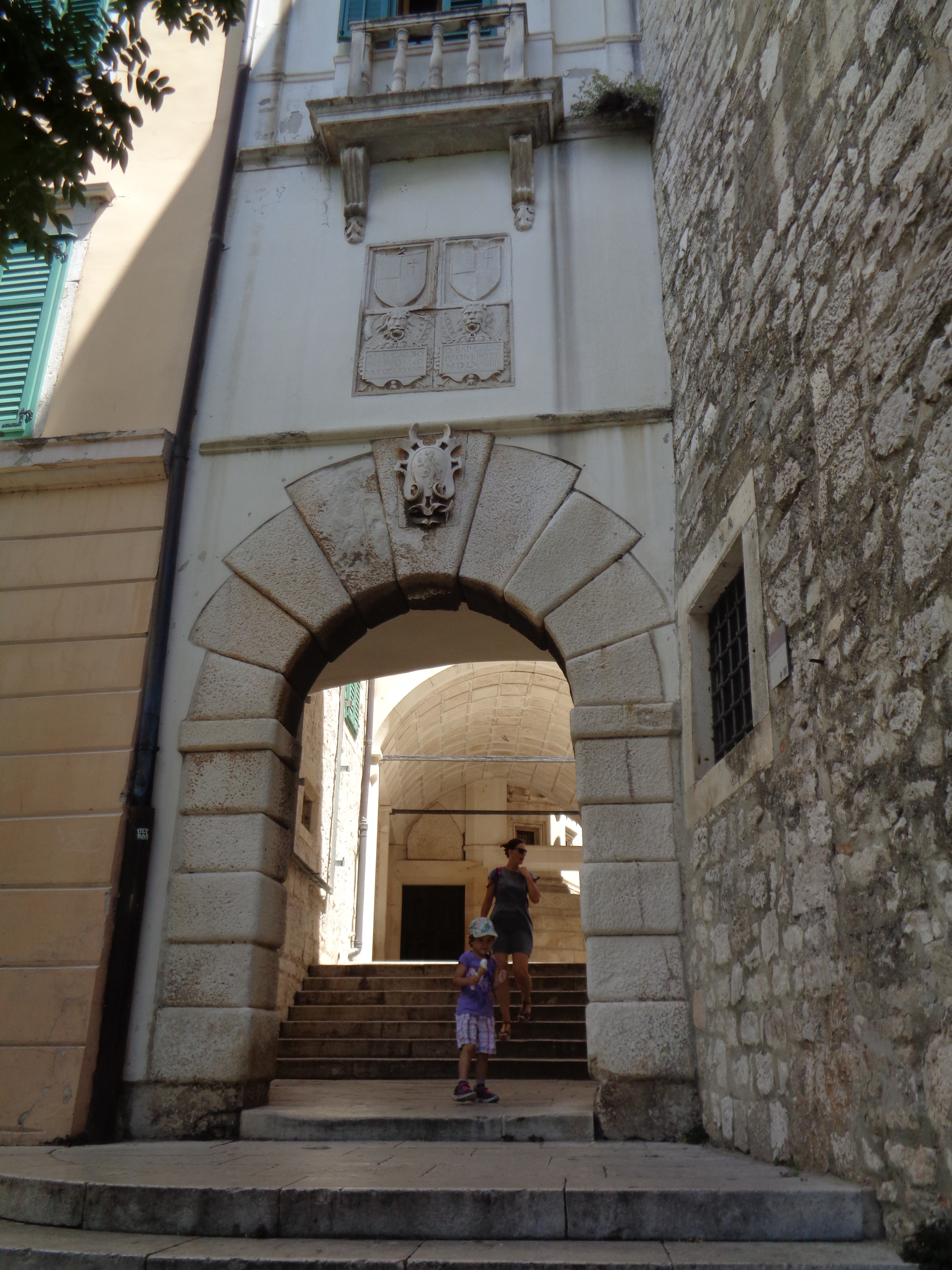
The City "New Gate" (16th century)

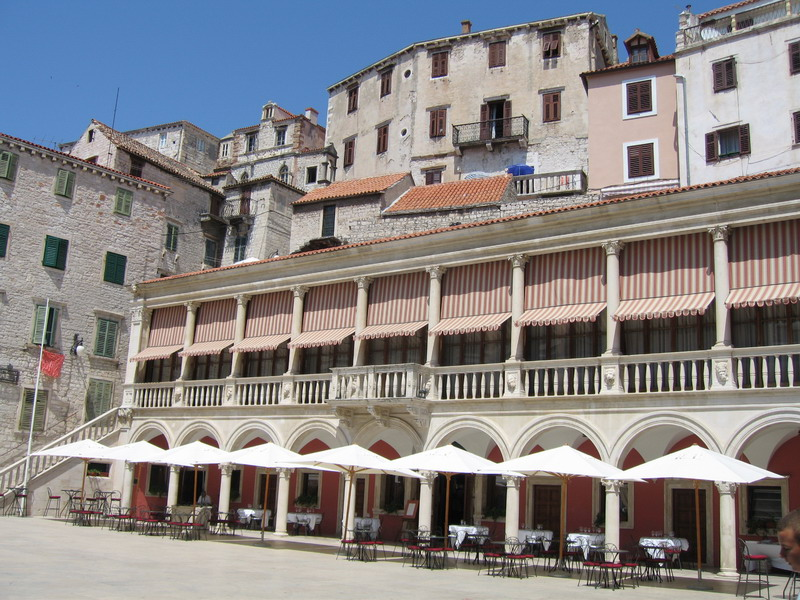
Town Hall

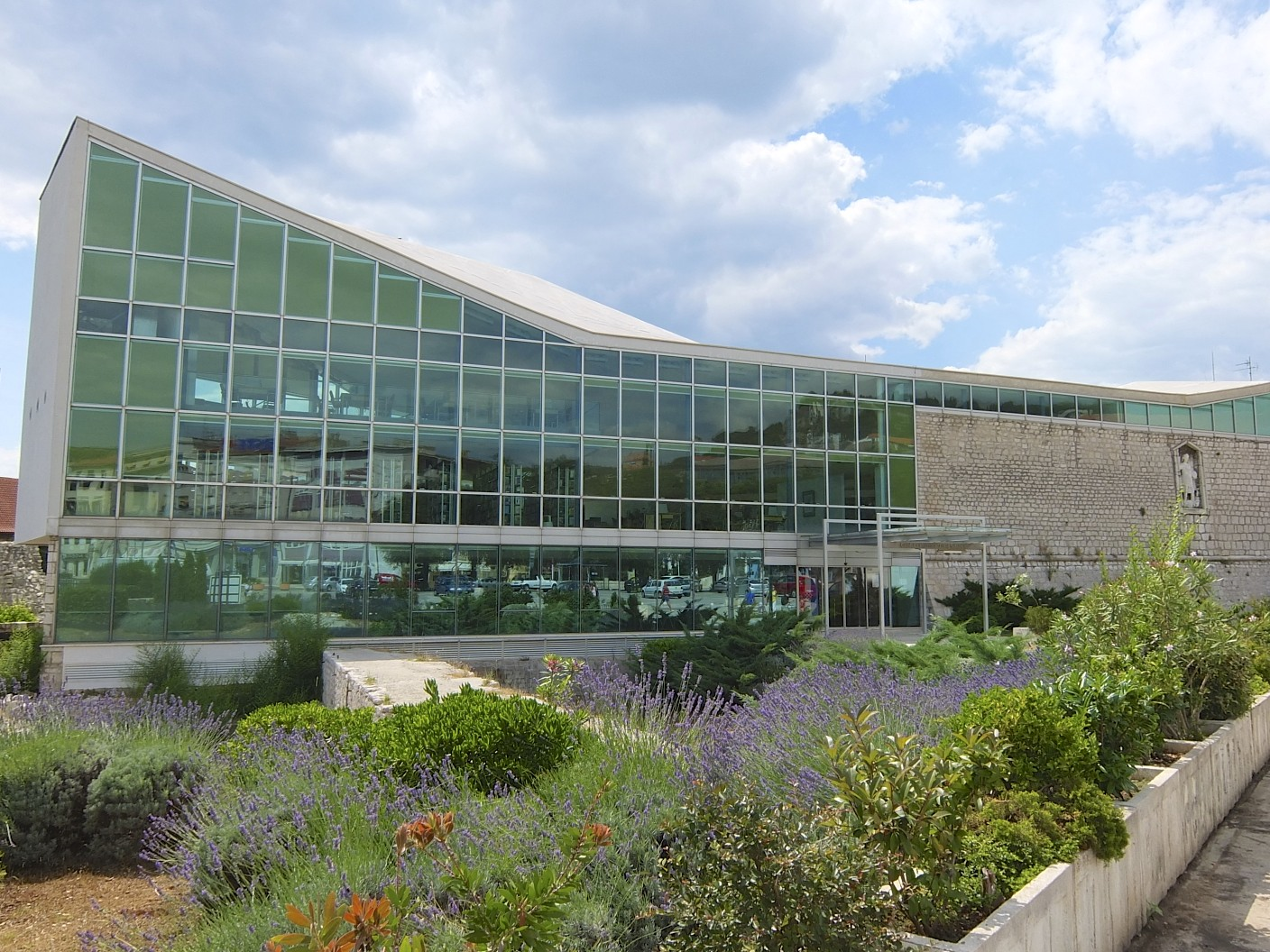
Šibenik City Library

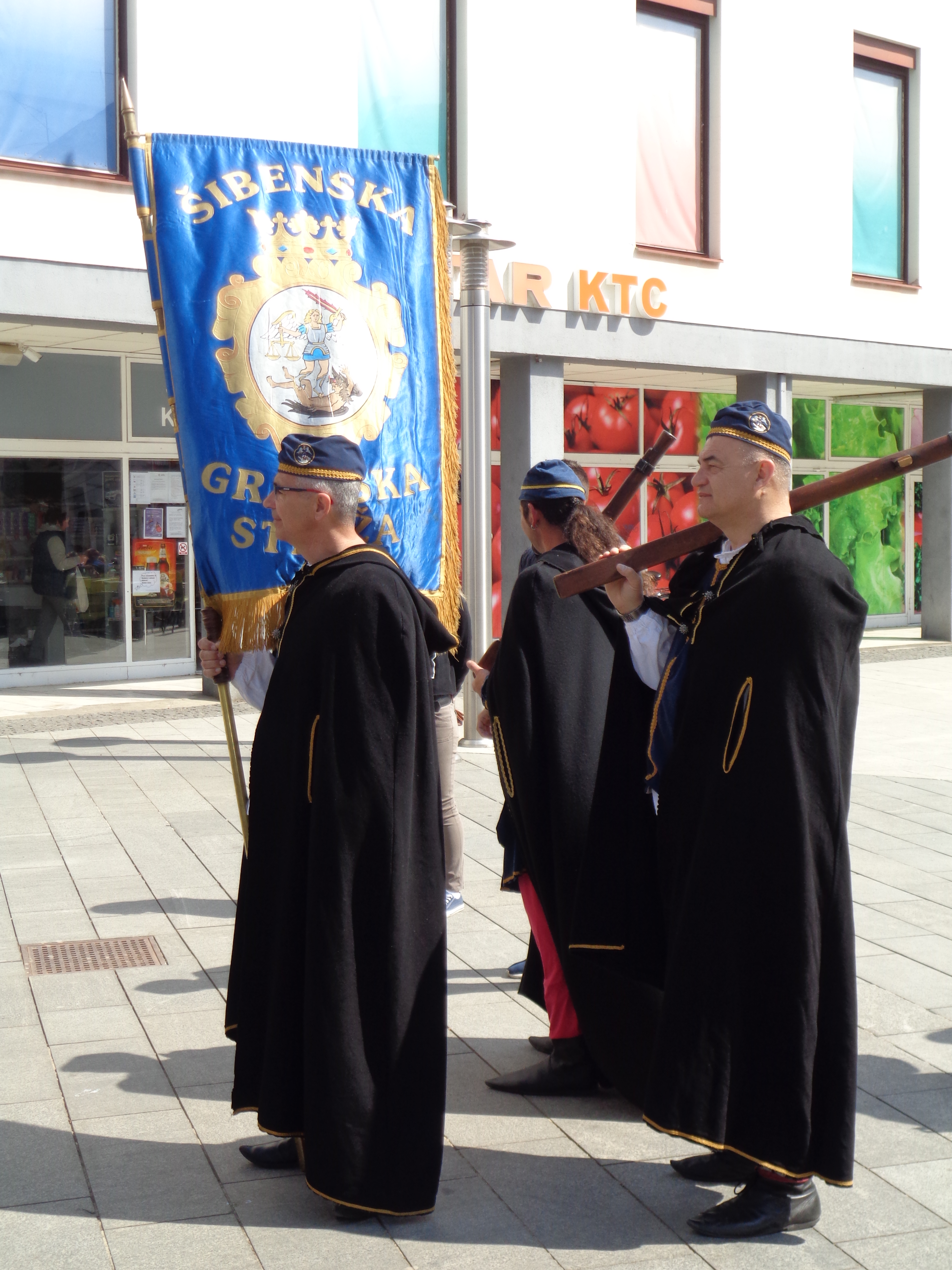
Šibenik City Guard, a historical military unit

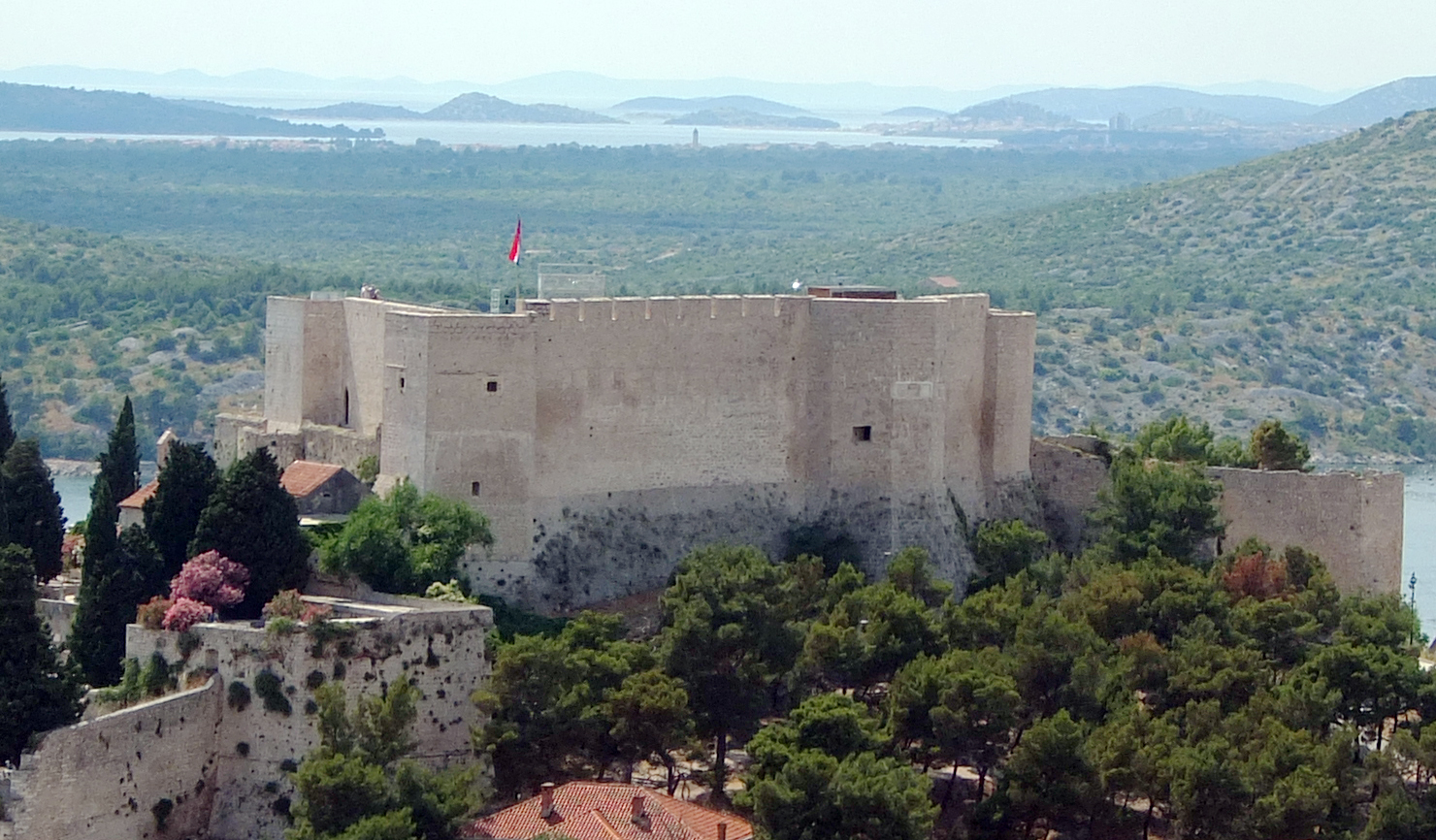
St. Michael's Fortress

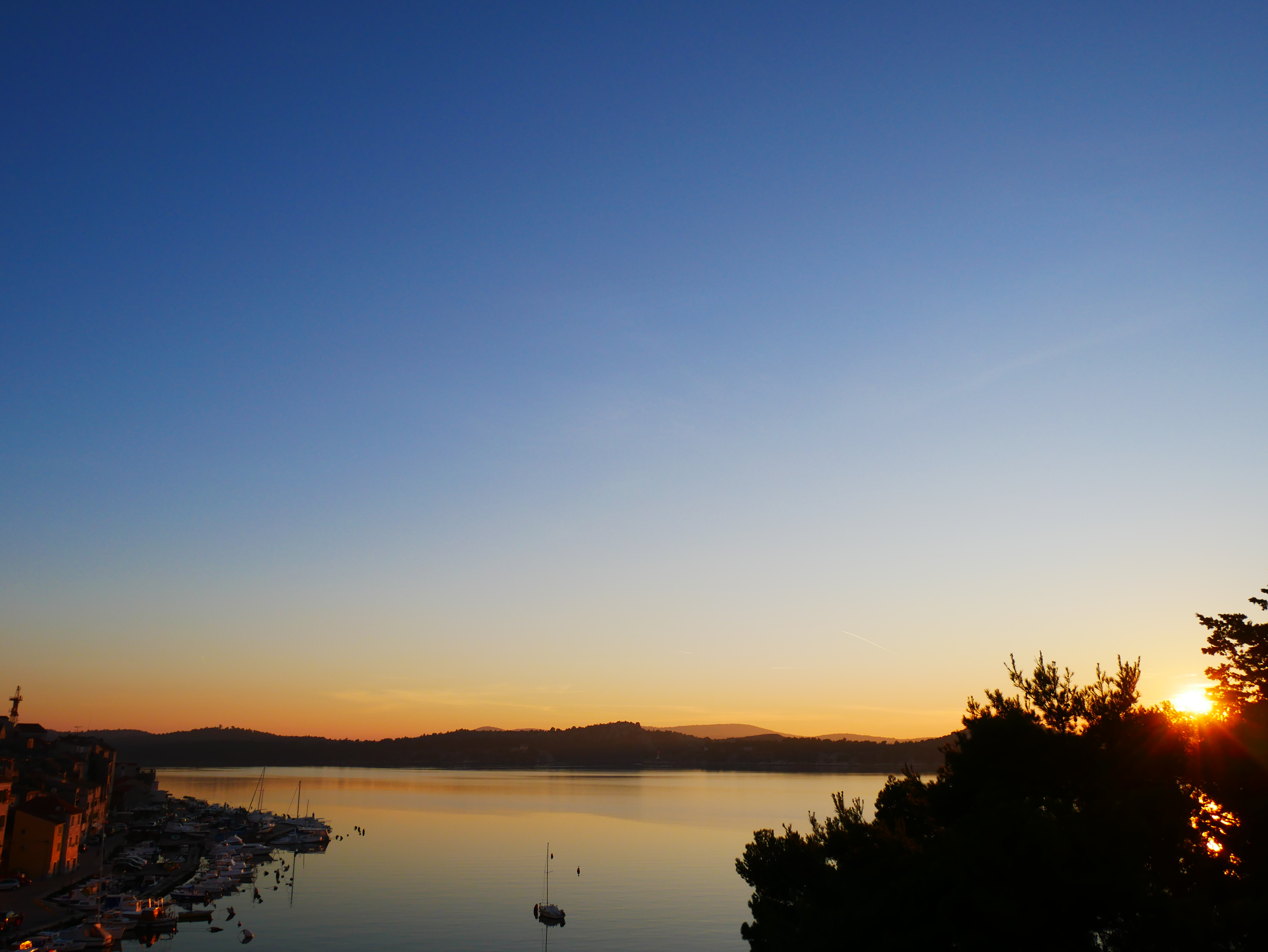
Šibenik sunset

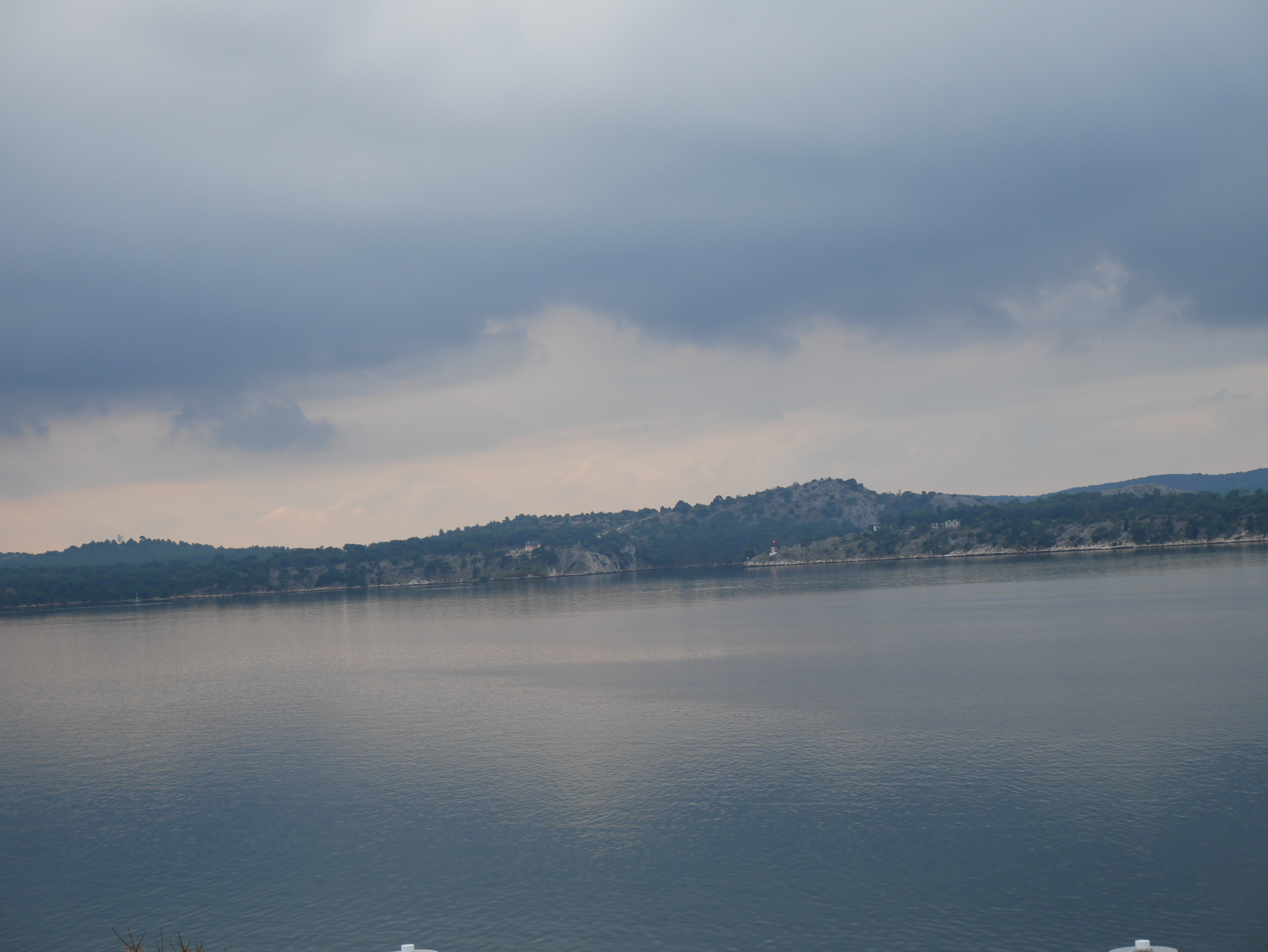
View from Banj beach to St. Anthony Channel

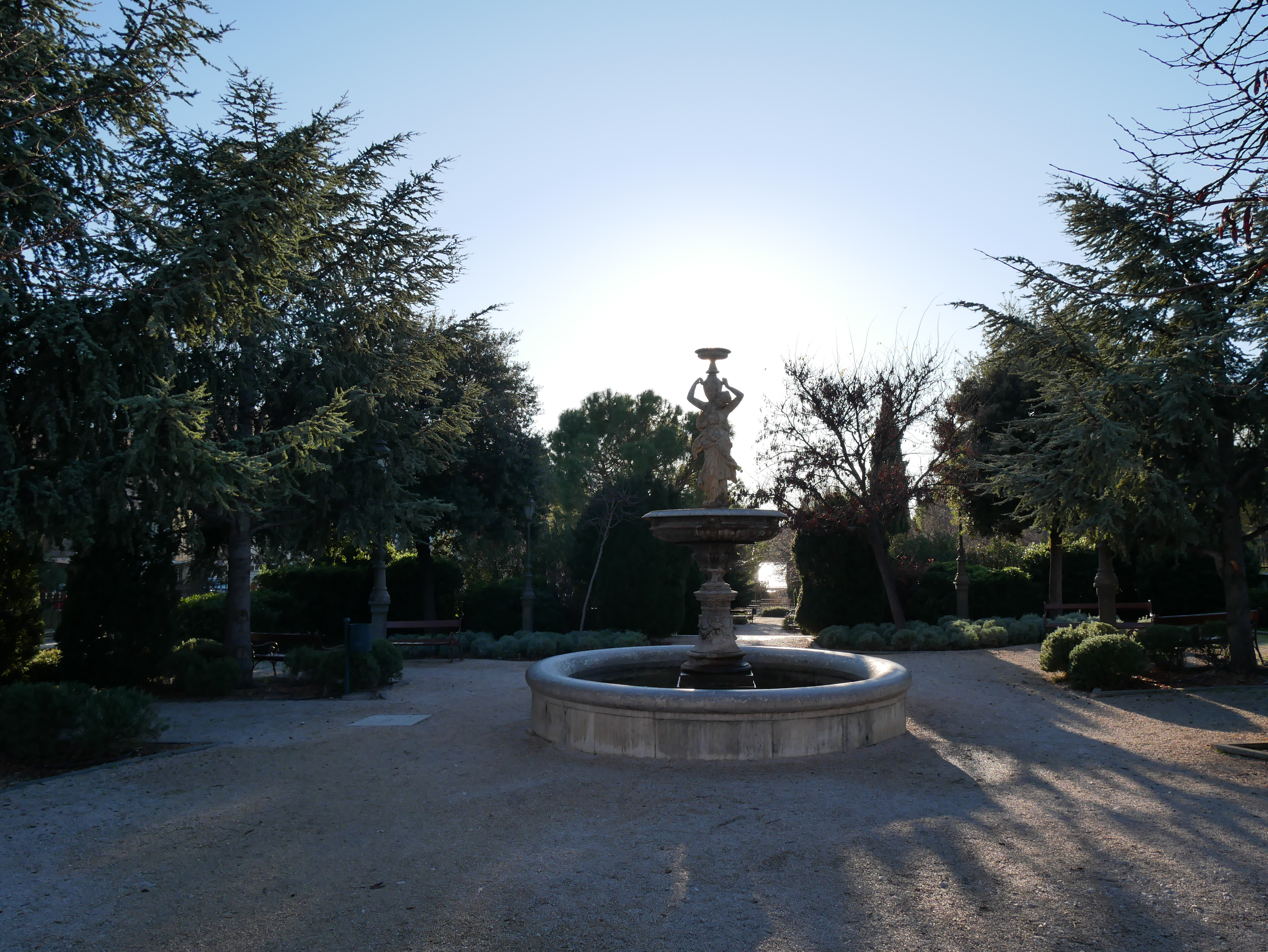
Fountain located in the Robert Visiani Park

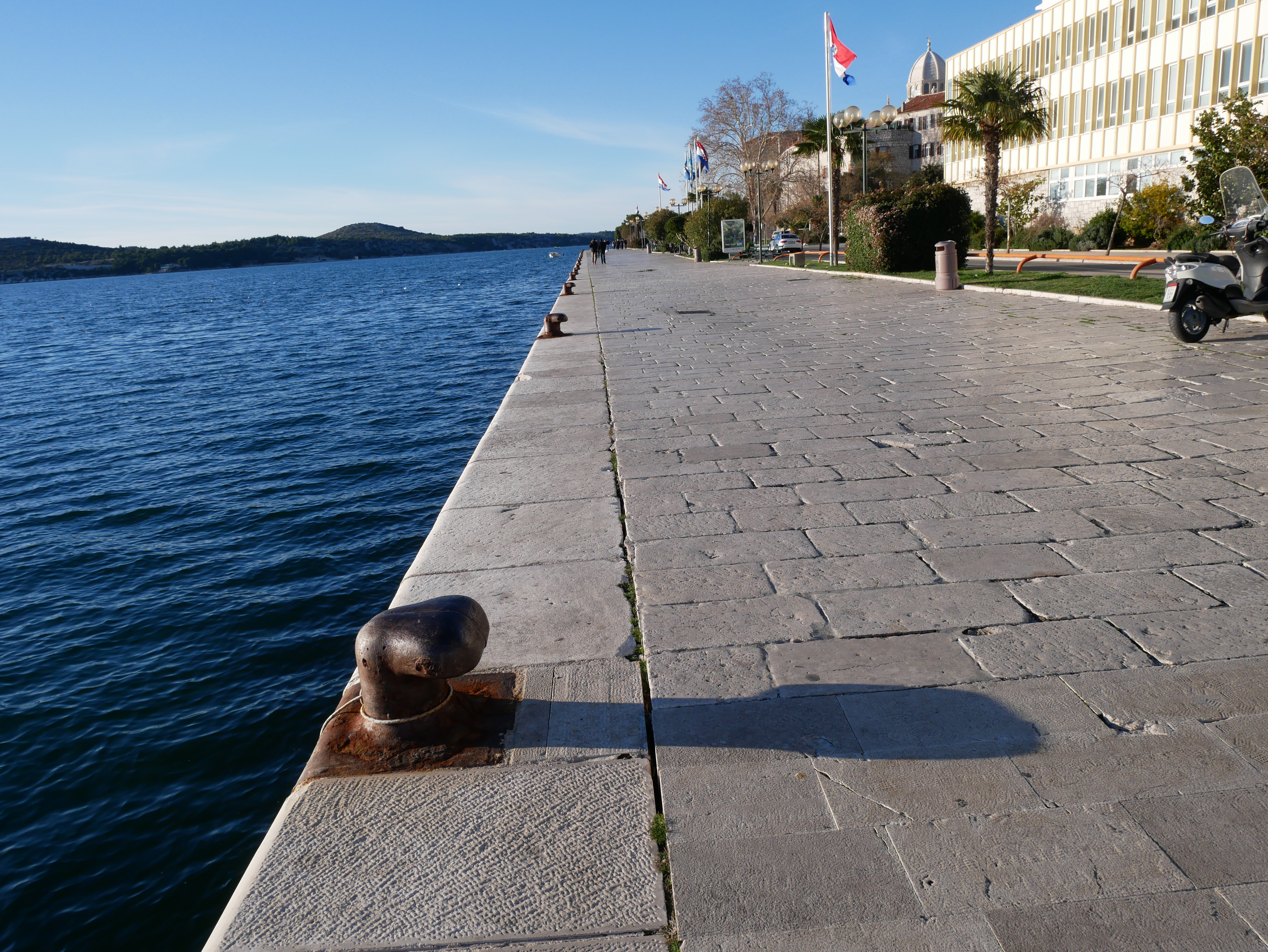
Šibenik coast

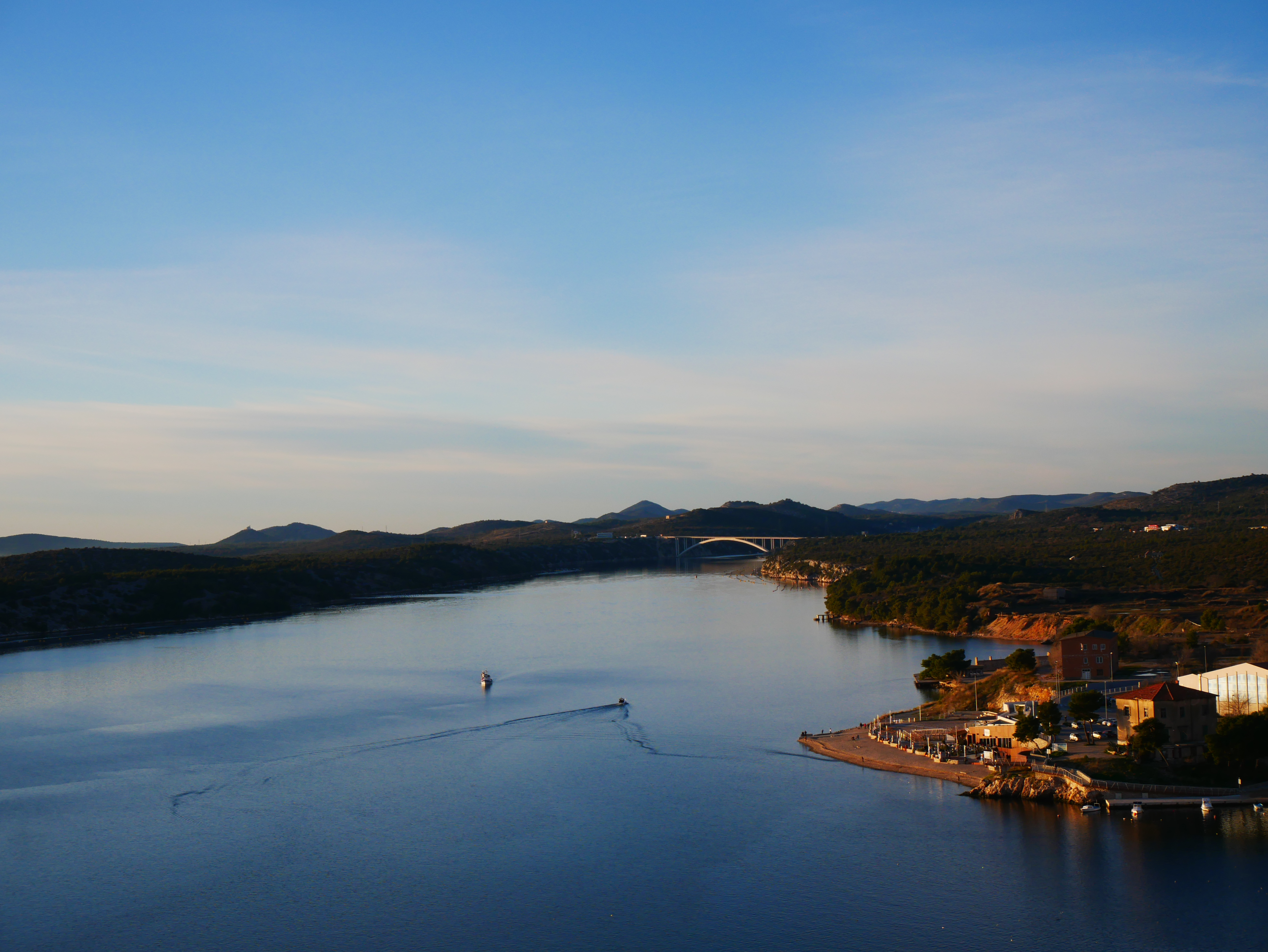
Šibenik sea including Banj beach and Šibenik Bridge

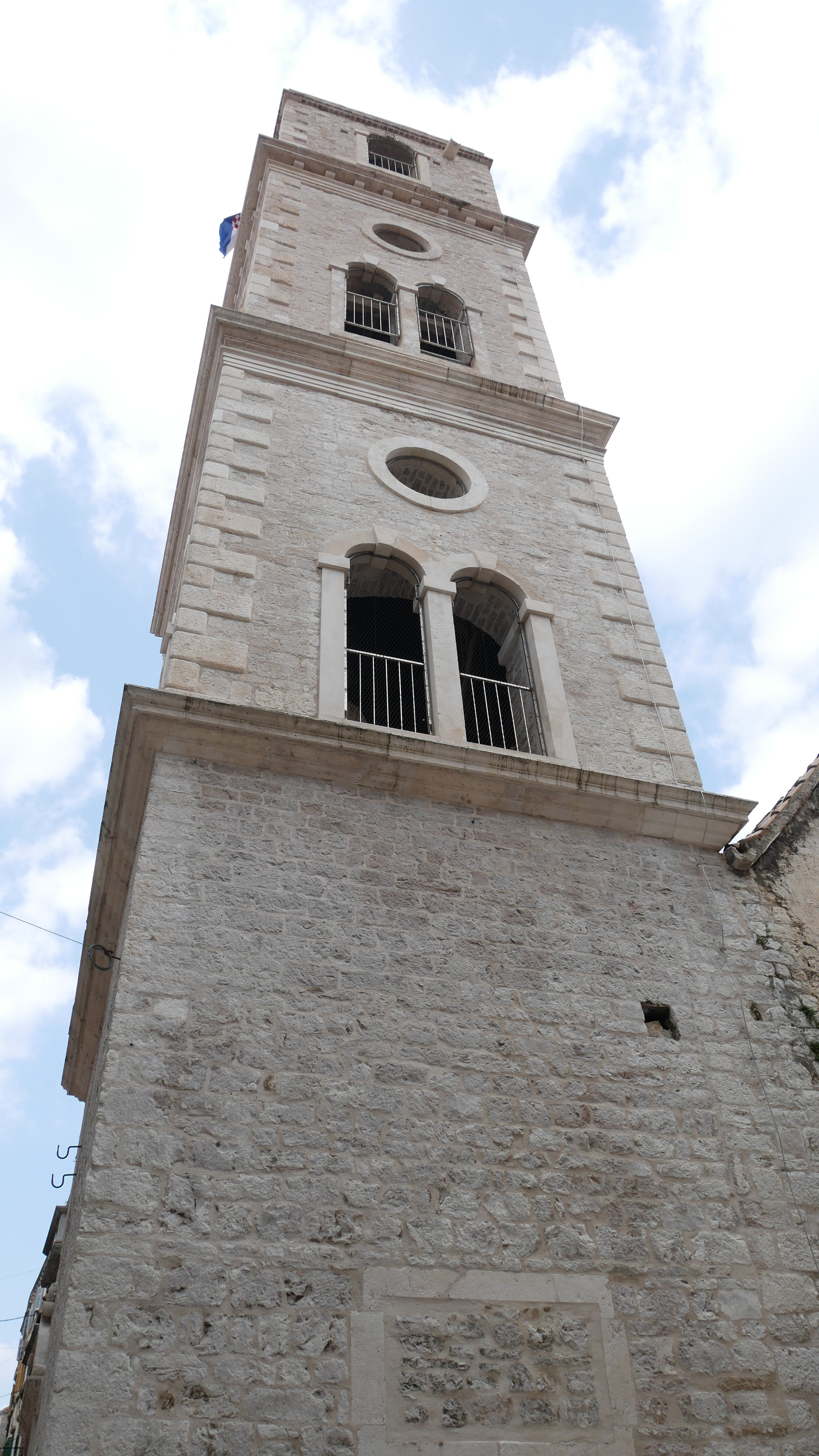
St. John's Church bell tower

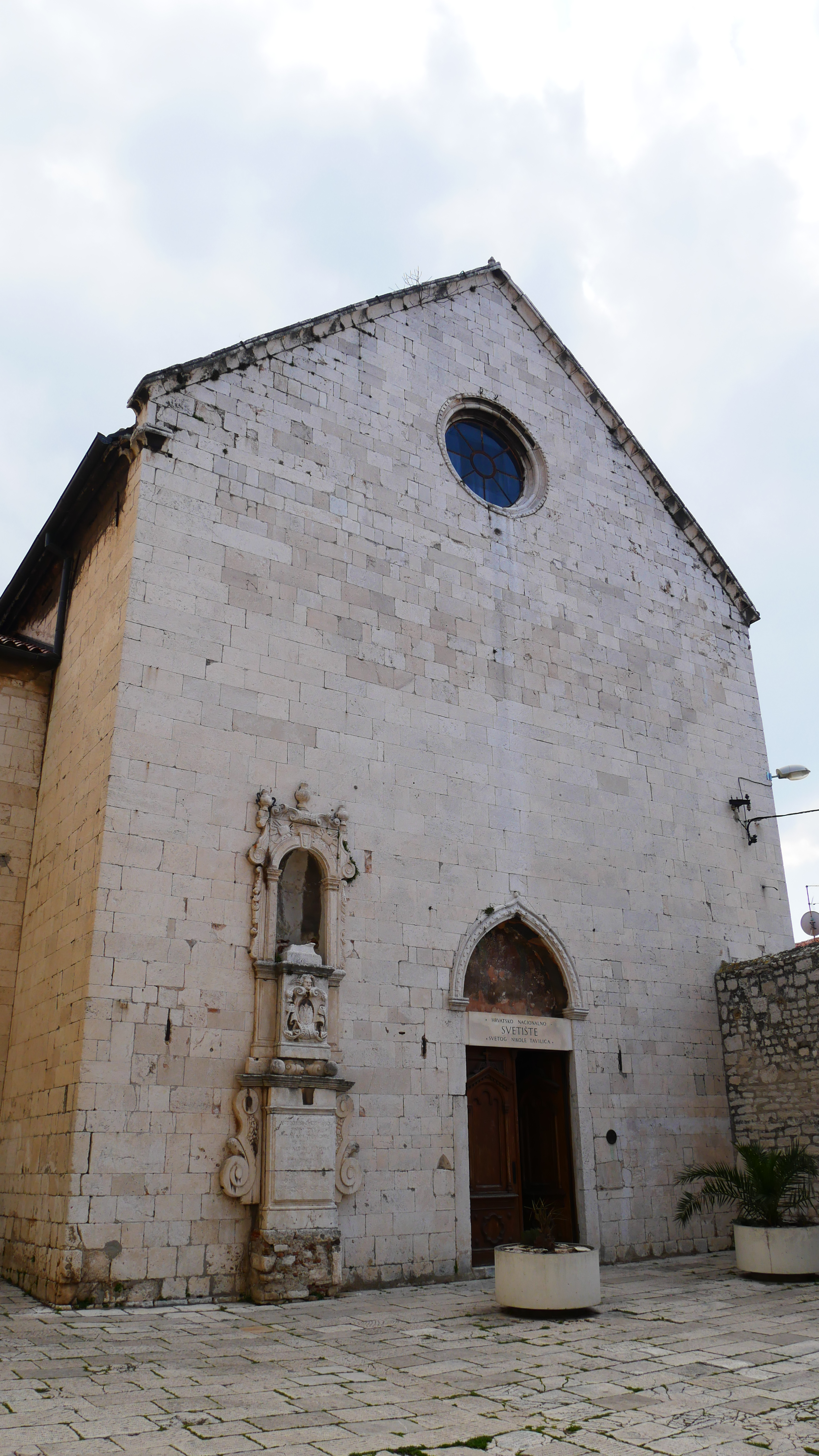
Entrance to the church of St. Francis

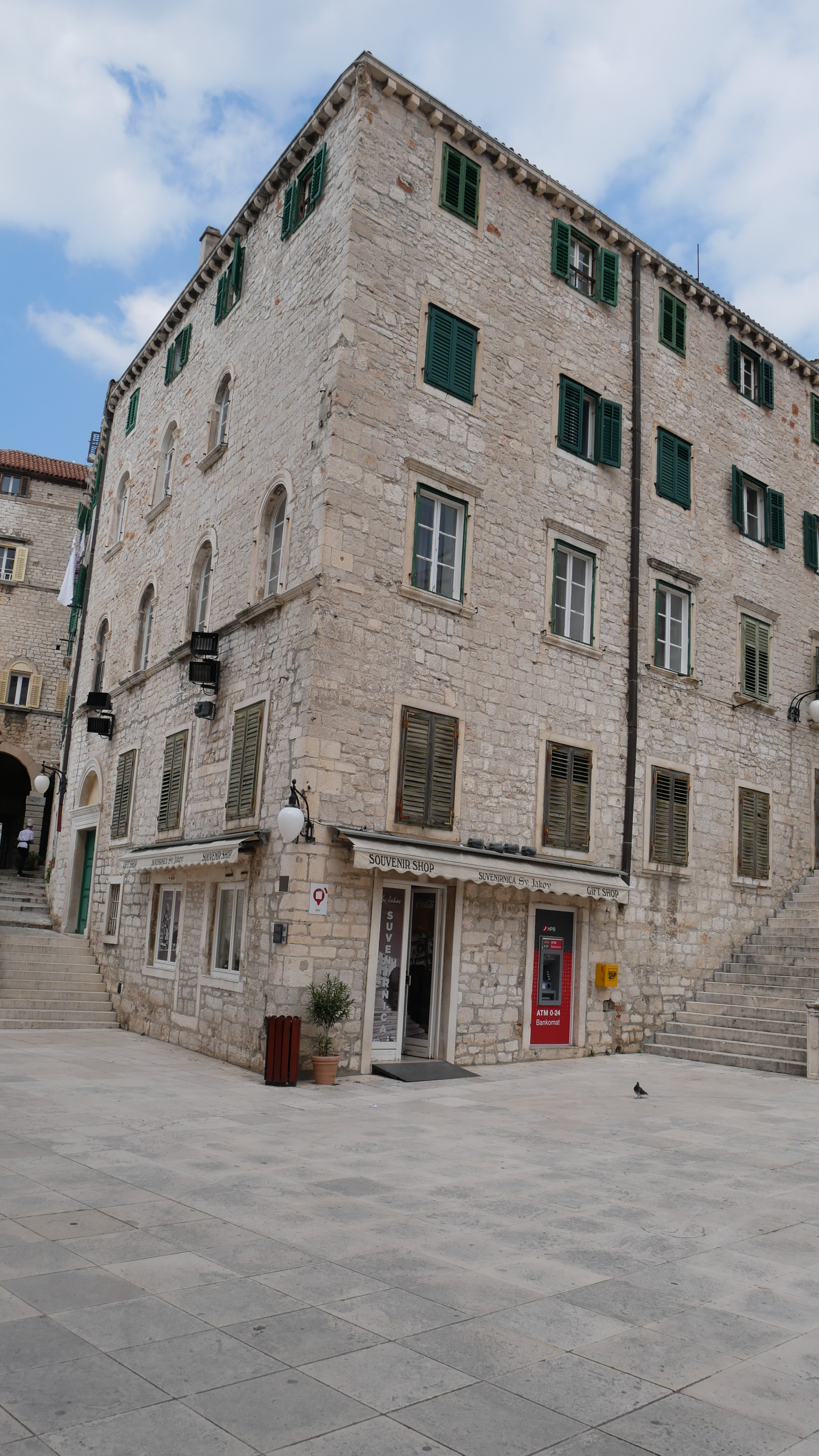
Pellegrini Palace

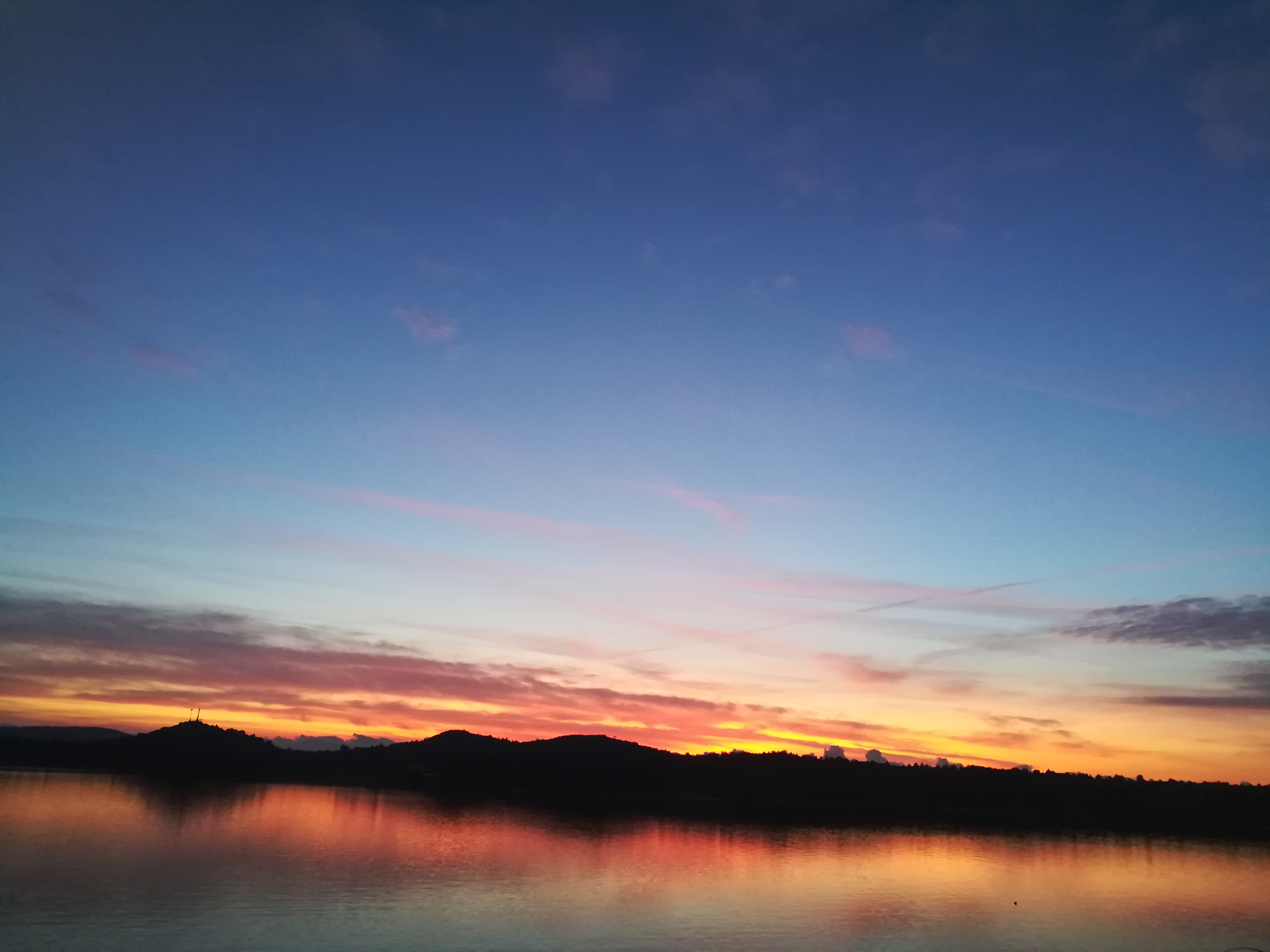
Sunset over St. Anthony's Channel

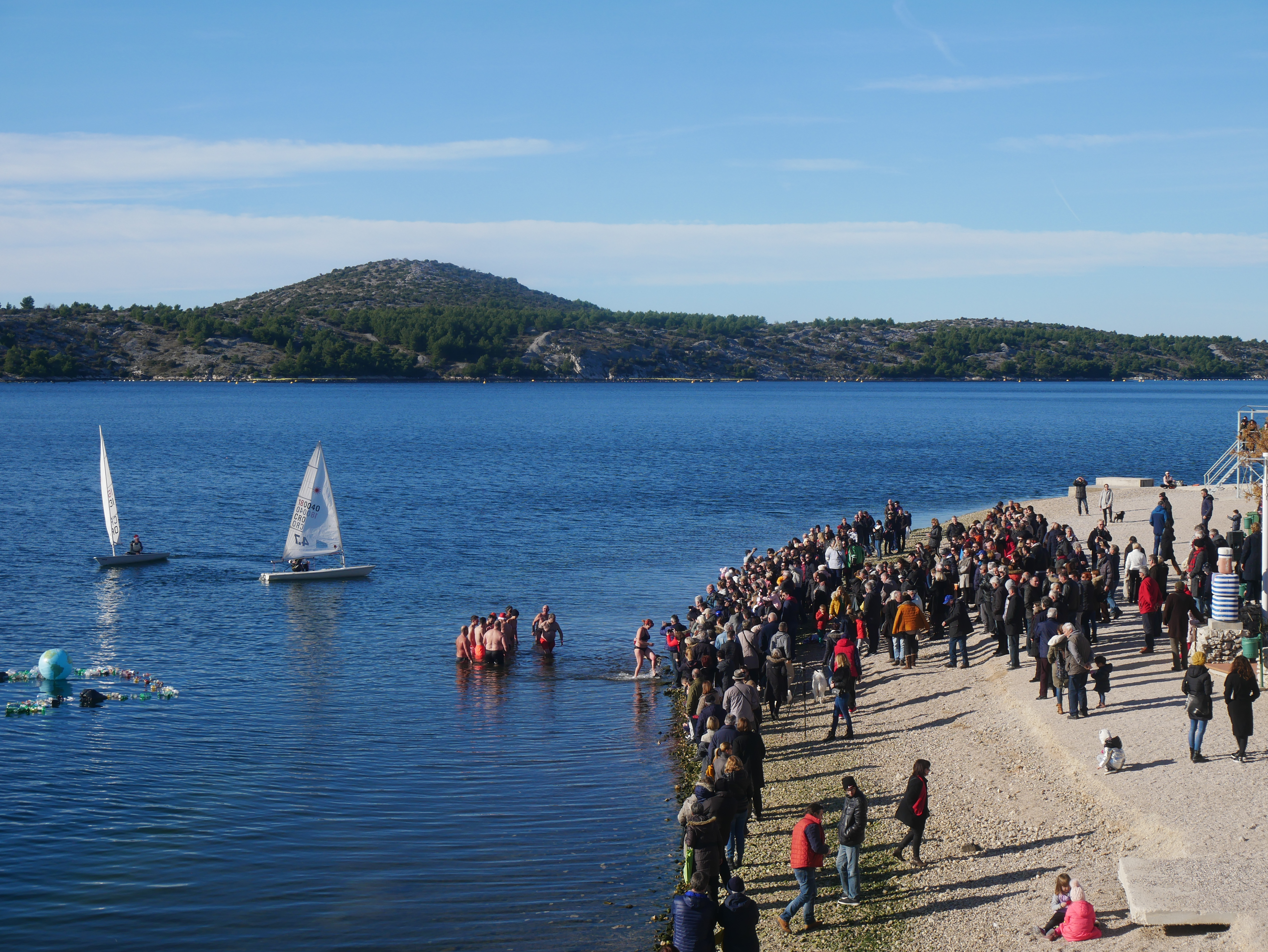
Banj beach's traditional New Year's Day swimming

== See also ==
- Jadrija
- Antun Vrančić High School
- Šibenik railway station
- Stato da Màr
