= Panorama Viewpoint =

Coordinates: 43°45′44″N 15°50′47″E

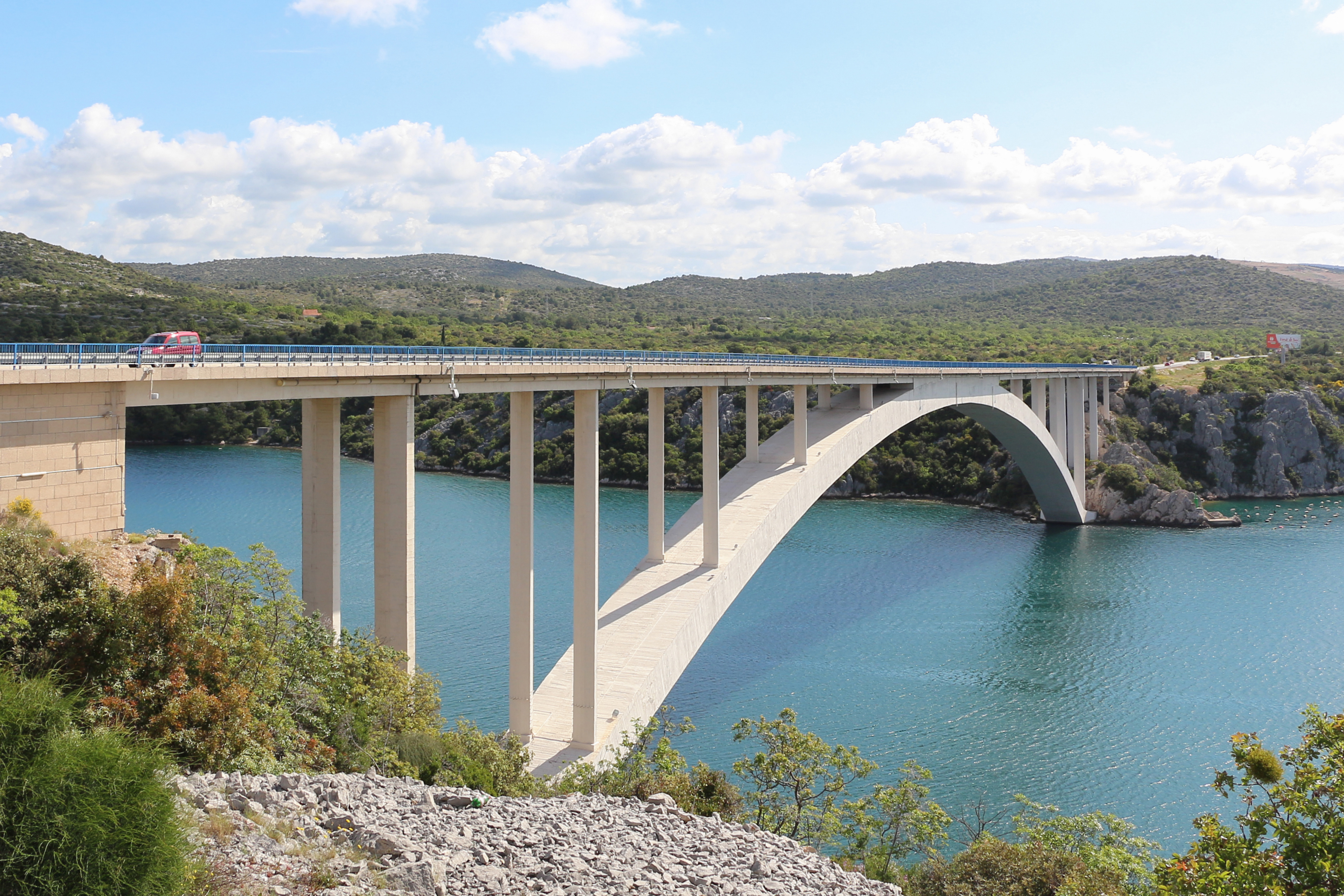
Šibenik bridge

Panorama Viewpoint is located to the right of the Šibenik Bridge (from the direction of Vodice) in the city of Šibenik, Croatia. The bridge connects the two sides of the Šibenik Channel and the Panorama Viewpoint is located on the south side of the channel.

== Viewpoint ==
The view that can be seen from the viewpoint goes from a portion of the channel to the right side of the bridge until a part of the city of Šibenik called Mandalina as well as the city itself. Three (out of four) fortresses can also be seen: St. John, St. Michael and Šubićevac, while St. Nicholas cannot be seen since it is located in St. Anthony's Channel. When the weather is nice and clear, the top of St. James's Cathedral in Šibenik can be seen from the viewpoint too. St. James's Cathedral is a heritage building protected by UNESCO.

== Šibenik Bridge ==
During the summer season bungee jumping is a popular activity on the Šibenik Bridge. Jumpers jump from the middle of the bridge, from a height of 40 m. Visitors can also watch the bungee jumping from the Panorama Viewpoint.

== Rest stop and parking ==
Right next to the viewpoint area there is a cafe, hotel and parking.
