= St. Michael's Fortress =

Coordinates: 43.7377°N 15.8896°E

- Tvrđava sv. Mihovila (Croatian)
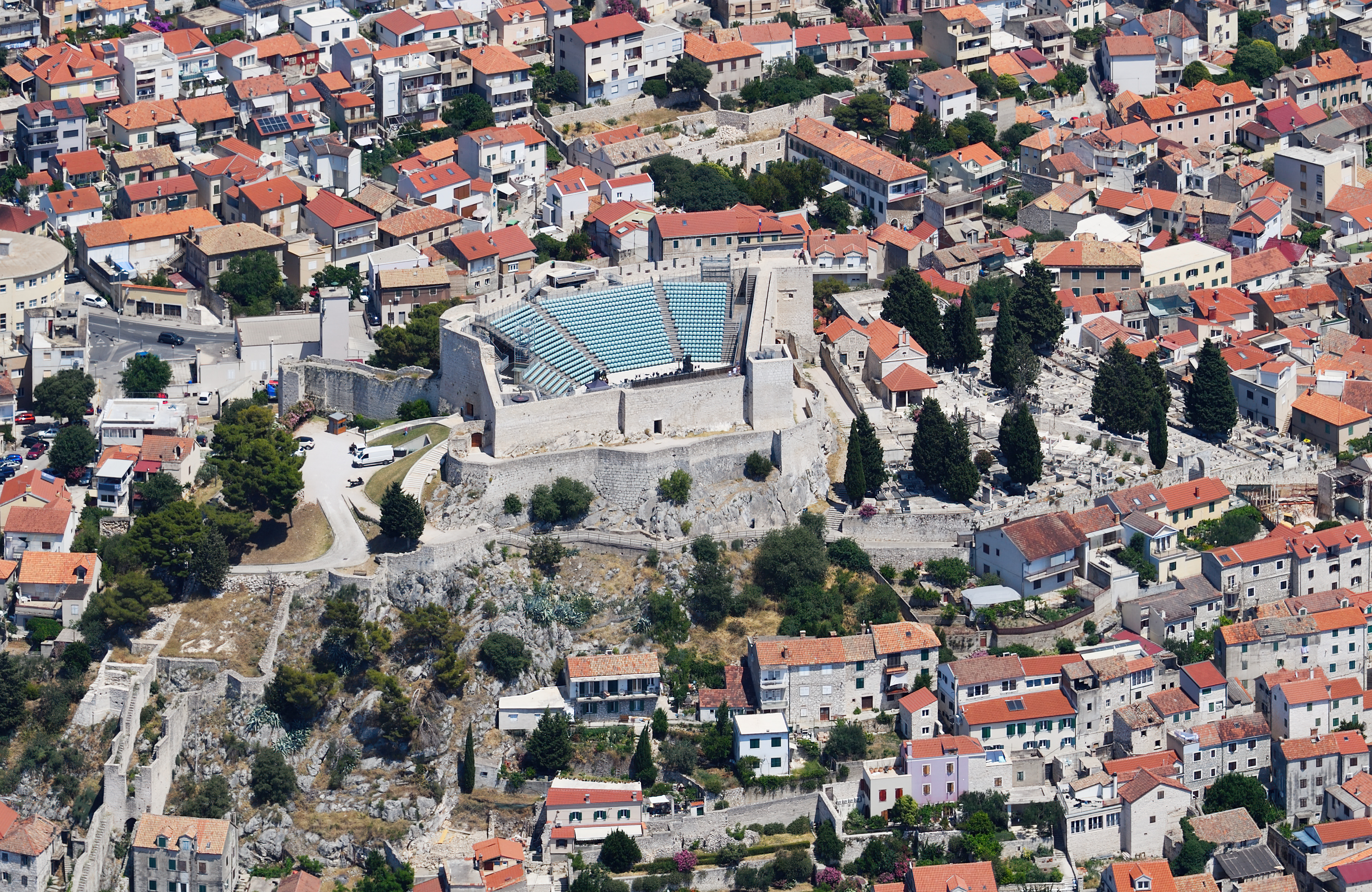
- Interactive map of St. Michael's Fortress
- Type: Fortress
- Location: Šibenik, Croatia

St. Michael's Fortress (Croatian: Tvrđava sv. Mihovila; Venetian: Castel vecchio; formerly known as St. Anne's Fortress) is a medieval fort in Šibenik, Šibenik-Knin County, Croatia, situated on a steep hill above the old historic center of the city. Its strategically favorable and dominant position made it the central part of Šibenik fortification system. The location was more or less continuously occupied since the Iron Age, as is witnessed by numerous archaeological findings from the era. The city of Šibenik was first mentioned on 25 December 1066 in a charter signed by King Peter Krešimir IV and verified by his courtiers. It is widely considered that the signing took place at St. Michael's Fortress.

== Name ==
St. Michael's Fortress was named after the oldest church in Šibenik, St. Michael's church, which was located inside its walls. One theory suggests that the church was built during the first wave of Christianization of Croatia, from the late 8th to the early 9th century. The first source that mentions St. Michael's church is a 12th/13th century hagiographic text Vita beati Ioannis episcopi et confessoris Traguriensis. During the Venetian rule, an unflattering name castel vecchio (old castle) was commonly used. The miraculous image of Madonna of the Castle, highly revered by the citizens of Šibenik, was originally kept inside St. Michael's church. In 1663, the church, along with a large part of the fortress, was destroyed when a lightning strike caused an explosion of a gunpowder magazine. During the renovation, a statue of St. Anne (the protector from storms) was brought to a small 16th-century church located below the southeastern walls of the fortress. This church came to be known as St. Anne's church, and the surrounding area became the city graveyard in 1828. As the centuries passed, and the fortress got permanently closed as a military facility, the citizens of Šibenik began calling it St. Anne's Fortress, after the often-used public area nearby.

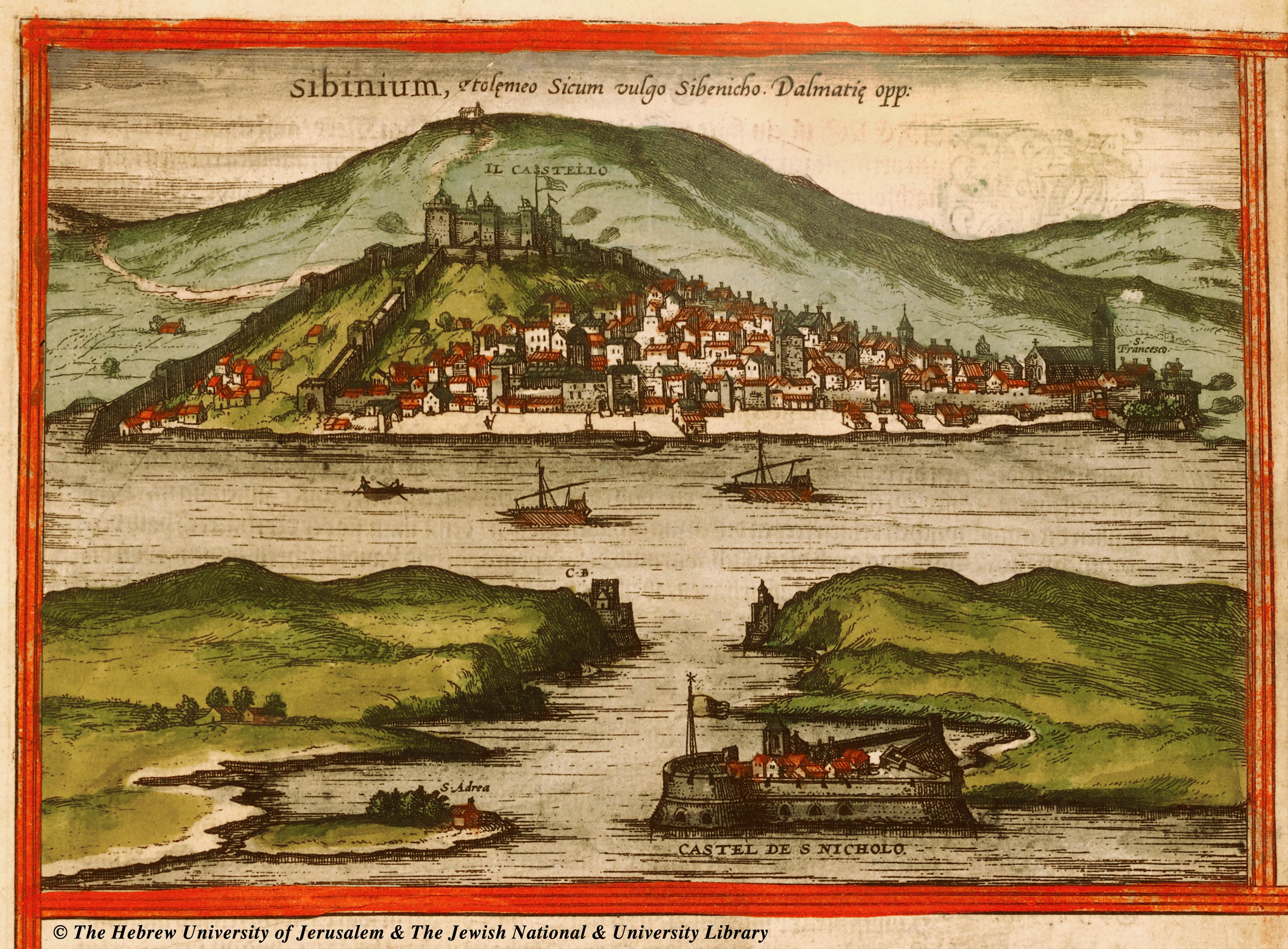
Map of Šibenik 1575

== Architecture and history ==
The importance of the fortress is evident not only in its favorable geographical position, but also in numerous archaeological findings, ranging from the Iron Age to 20th century. Throughout history, the fortress has been destroyed and rebuilt several times. Most of the fortress' structures can be dated to the early years of Venetian occupation, the early 15th century, but its numerous adaptations and interventions can be traced to mid-16th, early and mid-17th, mid-18th, and even early 19th centuries. As is typical for military architecture, St. Michael's Fortress contains only a few stylistically distinctive parts, for instance, the Gothic arch above the main entrance gate. The walls of the fortress are decorated with several coats of arms belonging to the city rectors or fortress' castellans that carried out certain construction works. Access to water, a key requirement of military life, was enabled via two cisterns that have been preserved to this day. Other supporting structures, such as barracks, storage rooms and other facilities, have not been preserved. The fortress consists of several elements: a castle/citadel, the northern and southern faussebraye, a lower western platform (place-of-arms), and the extending double walls that descend to the sea and were used for retreat or for providing supplies for the soldiers. At the end of the 11th century, Šibenik was referred to as a castrum. An 1116 report on the military campaign of Venetian Doge Ordelafo Faliero stated that the Doge had destroyed this "impregnable fort". During the High Middle Ages, the Archangel Michael became the dominant iconographic symbol of the Šibenik commune. In 1378, Venetian admiral Vettore Pisani failed to take over the fortress, succeeding however in conquering and setting fire to the rest of the city and its archives. In 1412, after a three-year siege, the city of Šibenik fell under the rule of the Venetian Republic and remained its part for a little less than four hundred years. Under the terms of the peace treaty, the fortress was to be demolished, but after only a year or two, the citizens asked their new government to fund its renovation. The double walls (strada del soccorso) were formed in the first decades of Venetian rule to ensure the safety of Venetian garrison. During the long rule of the republic, the city's fortification system was reinforced with additional objects, Barone Fortress, St. John's Fortress and St. Nicholas' Fortress. St. Michael's fortress was badly damaged in two explosions in 1663 and 1752, and due to its lesser importance in the city defense, it has never been fully rebuilt. The last interventions were made by the Austrian army in 1832. A signal station on the southeastern tower was constructed in 1911 to direct naval traffic through St. Anthony's Channel.

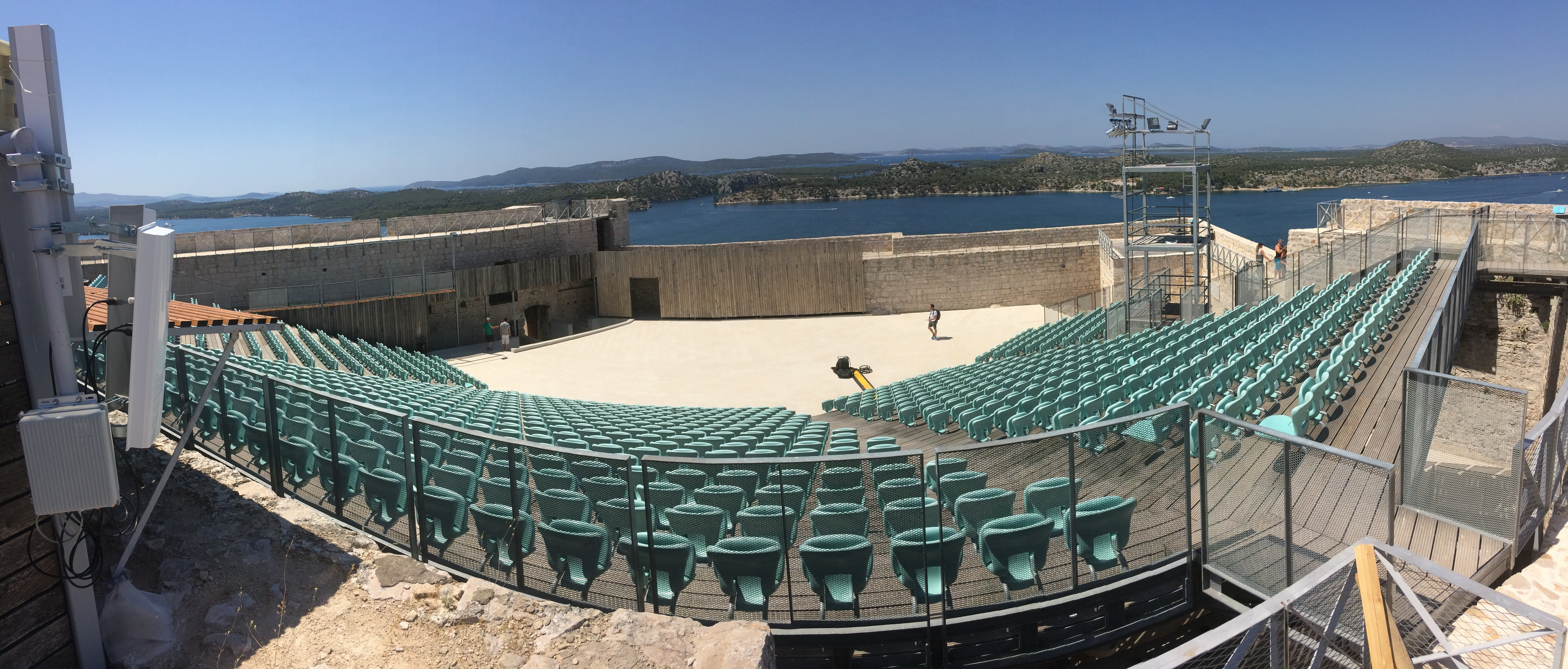
St. Michael's Fortress stage

== Revitalization project ==
St. Michael's Fortress was revitalized through an EU-funded project worth €1.67 million, and re-opened in July 2014. Just four months later, it won the national Cultural Attraction of the Year Award. Since the opening, its open-air summer stage has become an important part of Šibenik's cultural life. Today, it is the second most-visited heritage monument of Šibenik, as well as the second most-visited fortification object in Croatia.

== Gallery ==
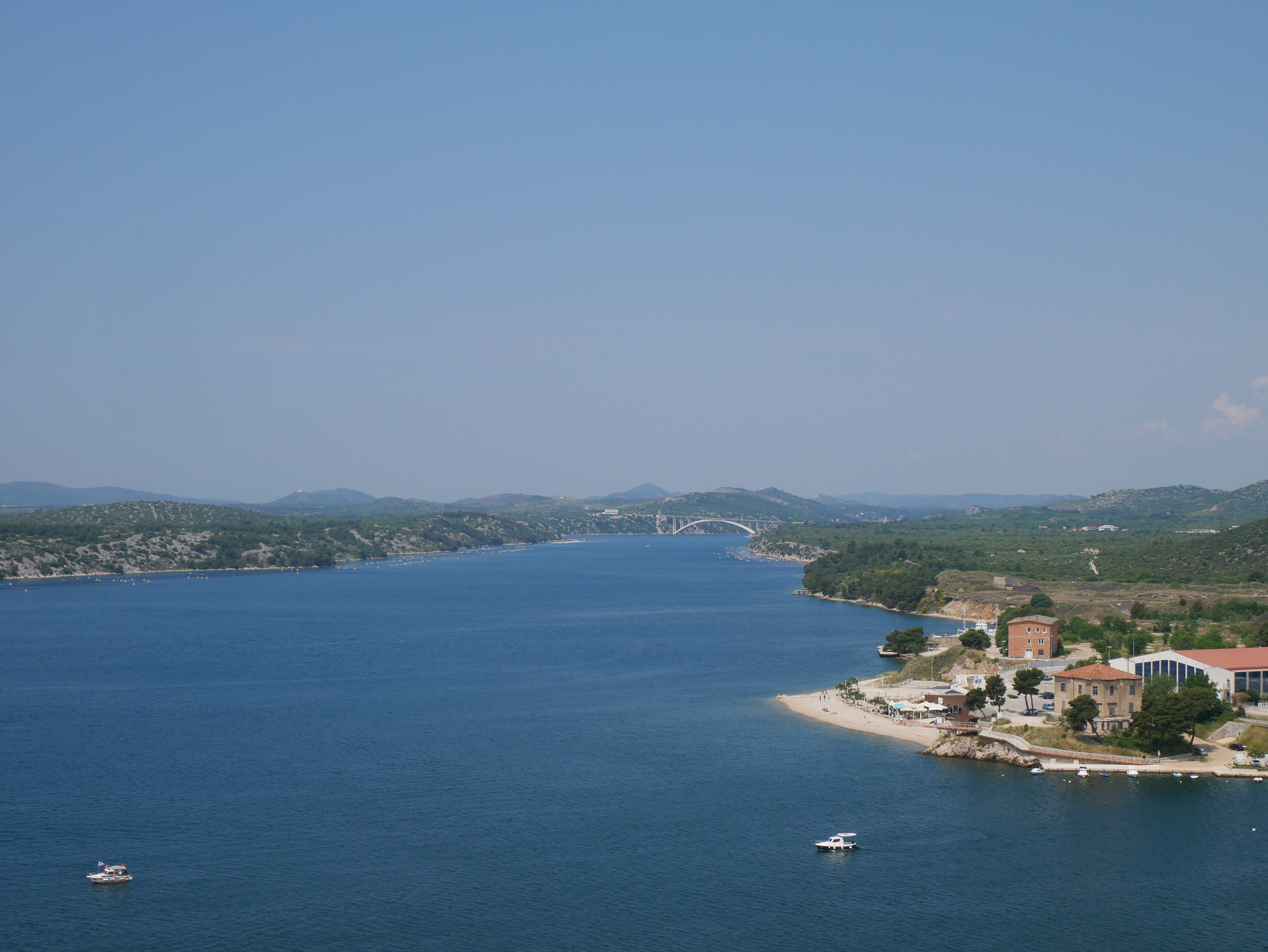
View of beach Banj and Šibenik sea from St. Michael's Fortress

View of St Anthony Channel from St. Michael's Fortress

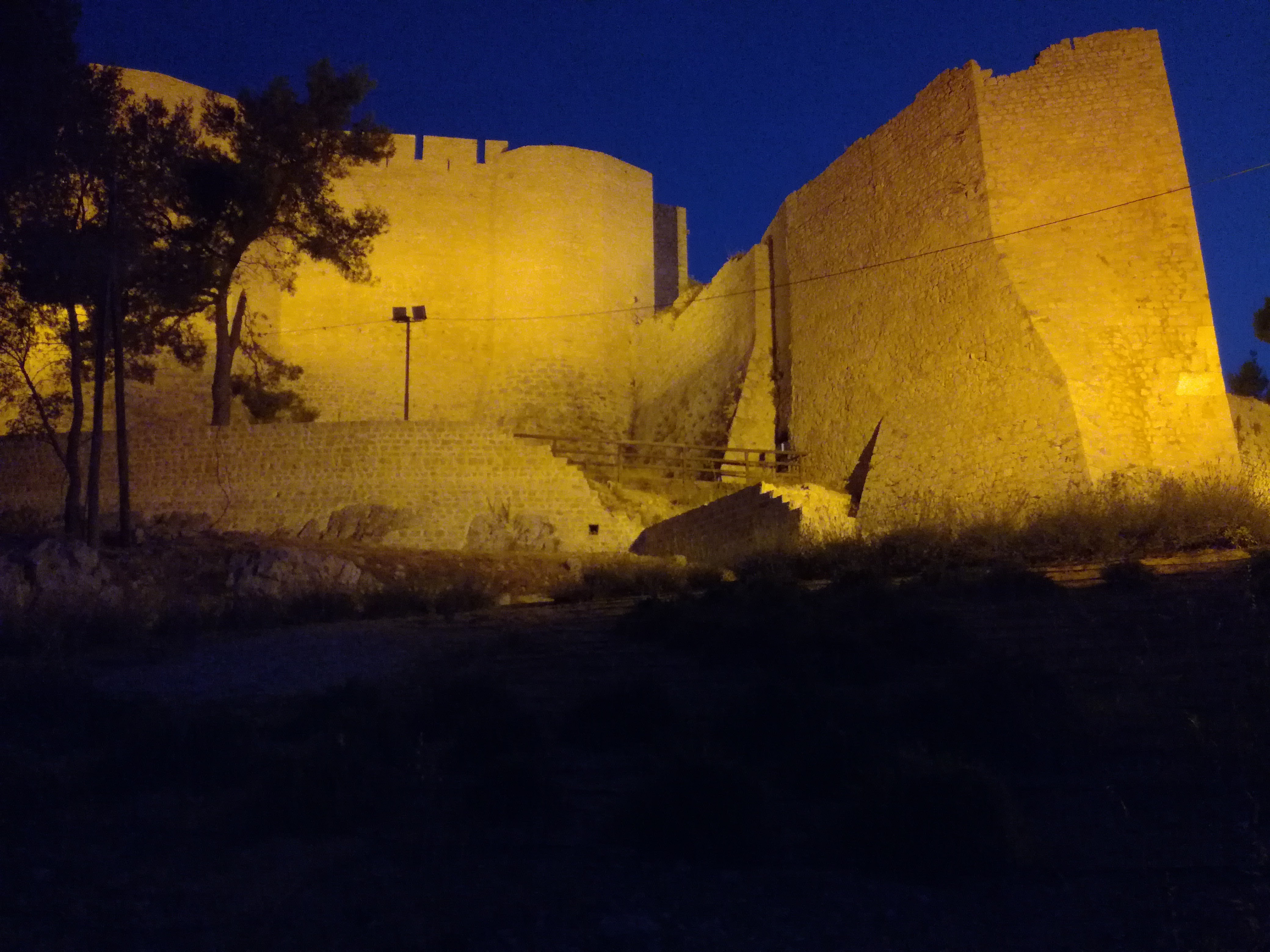
St. Michael's Fortress

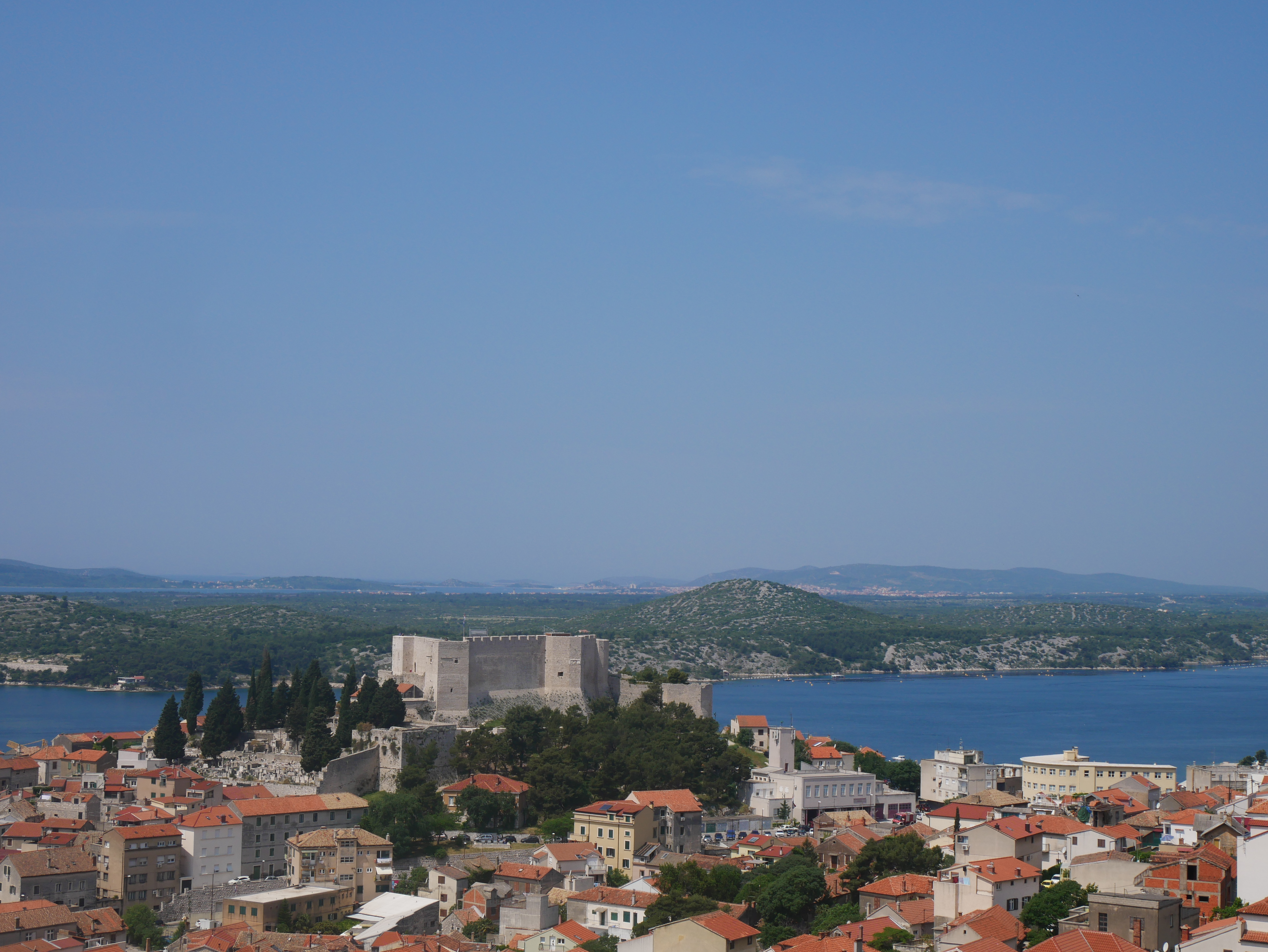
View of St. Michael's Fortress from Barone Fortress

View of Šibenik Cathedral and sea from St. Michael's Fortress

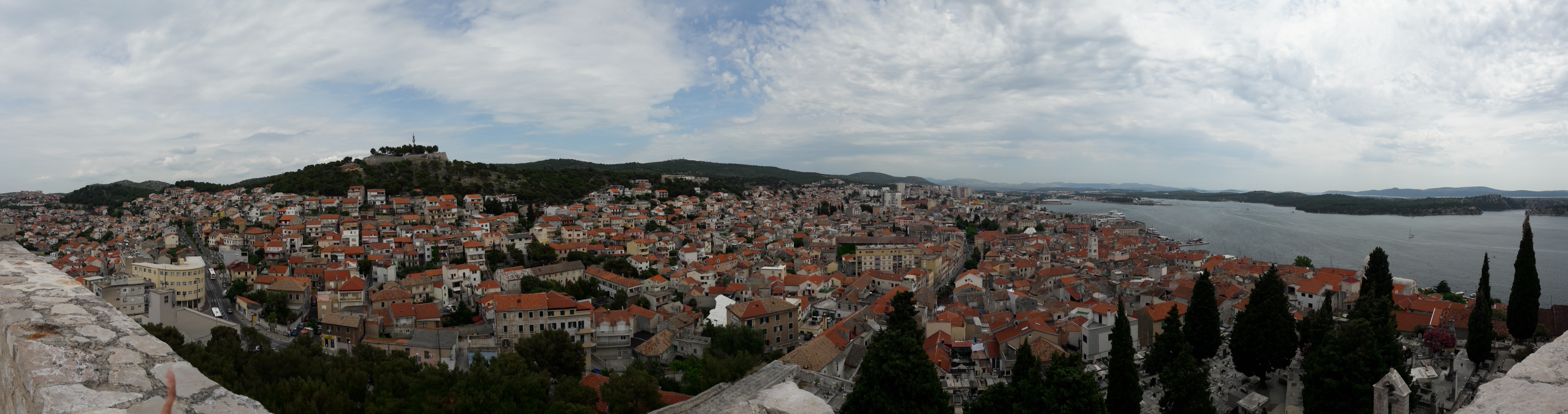
View of southern Šibenik from St. Michael's Fortress
