= Banj beach =

Beach in Croatia

Coordinates: 43.7411°N 15.8843°E

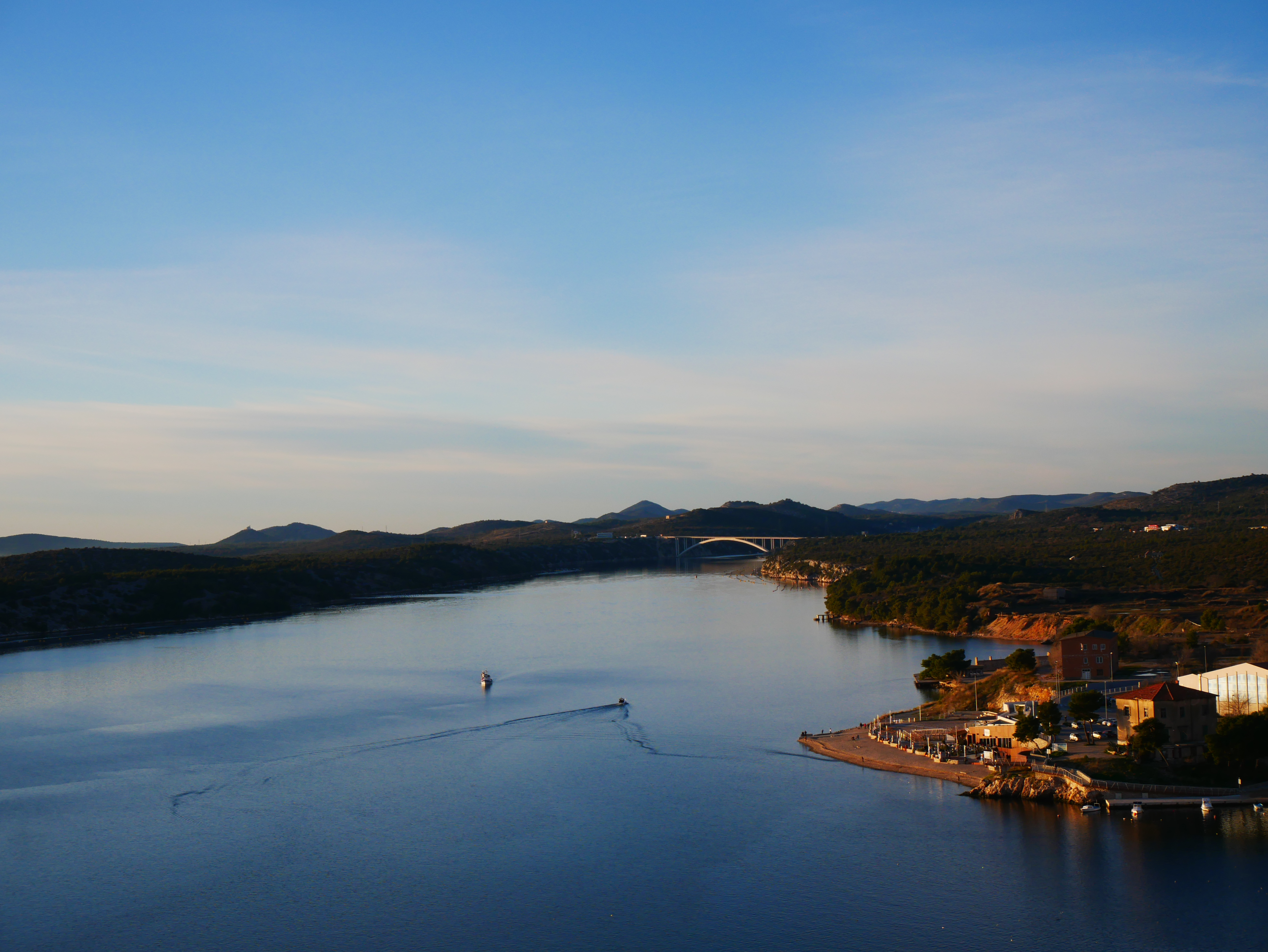
View of beach and Šibenik Bridge

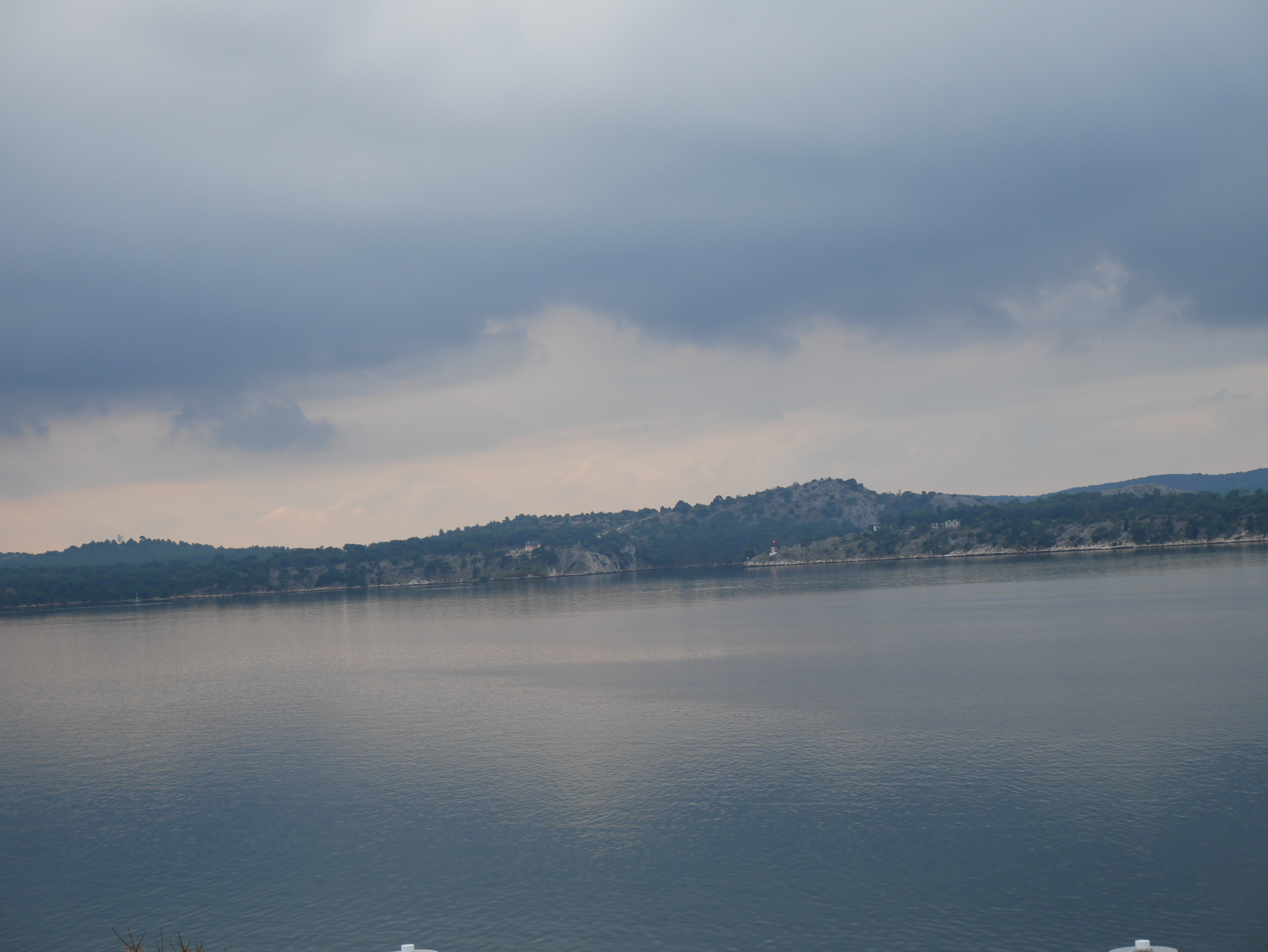
View from the beach to St. Anthony Channel

Banj Beach (Croatian: Plaža Banj) is the most famous beach based in Šibenik, Croatia. It was built in 2012. It is located one kilometer away from the center of the town. There are numerous amenities for children and adults on the beach, such as beach volleyball and Petrus bar, which is also a nightclub. The beach has a beautiful panoramic view of the old town, St. Michael's Fortress and St. Anthony Channel. Since 2013, events and concerts occur during the day and at night.
