= St. Anthony Channel =

Marine channel in the Adriatic Sea in Croatia

Location
- Interactive map of St. Anthony Channel

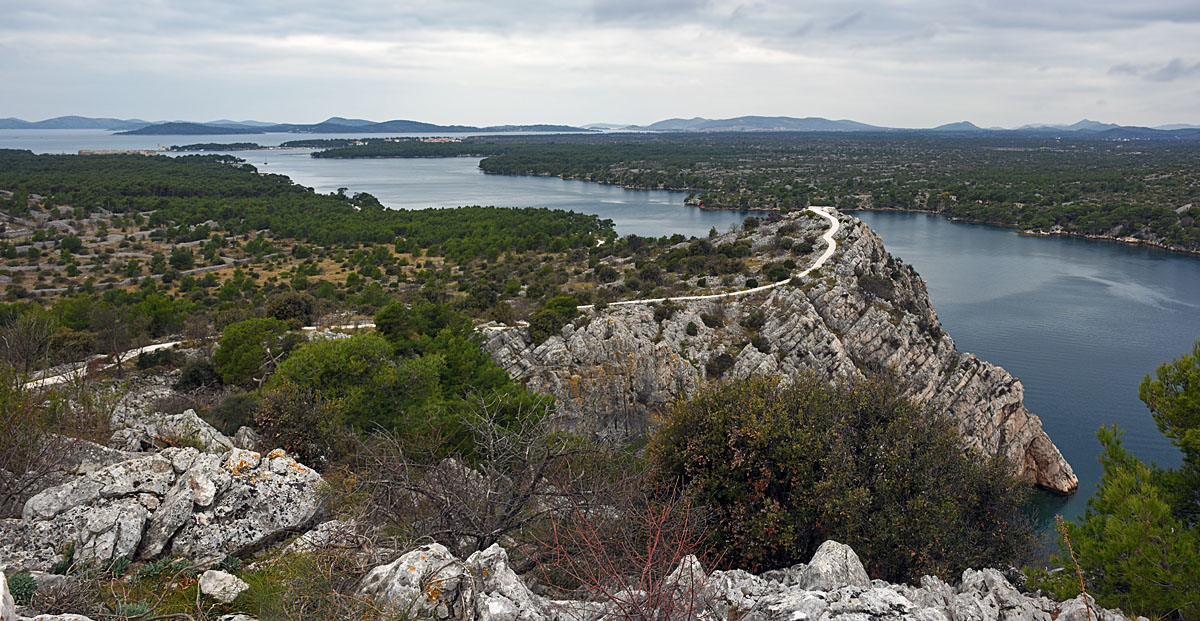
St. Anthony Channel

St. Anthony Channel (Croatian: Kanal svetog Ante) is a strait connecting Šibenik Bay to the Adriatic Sea. It was protected as a significant landscape in 1974. It is more than 2000 metres long and between 140 and 220 metres wide. It has become popular since walking trail was built alongside channel. The place is perfect for a variety of activities such as biking, walking, swimming and sightseeing. The most beautiful attractions of the channel include St. Nicholas' Fortress, located at the entrance of the channel, St. Anthony Cave, located in the middle of the channel and the nearby "Hitler's Eyes" bunker. There is a viewpoint with panoramic view of Šibenik near the cave.

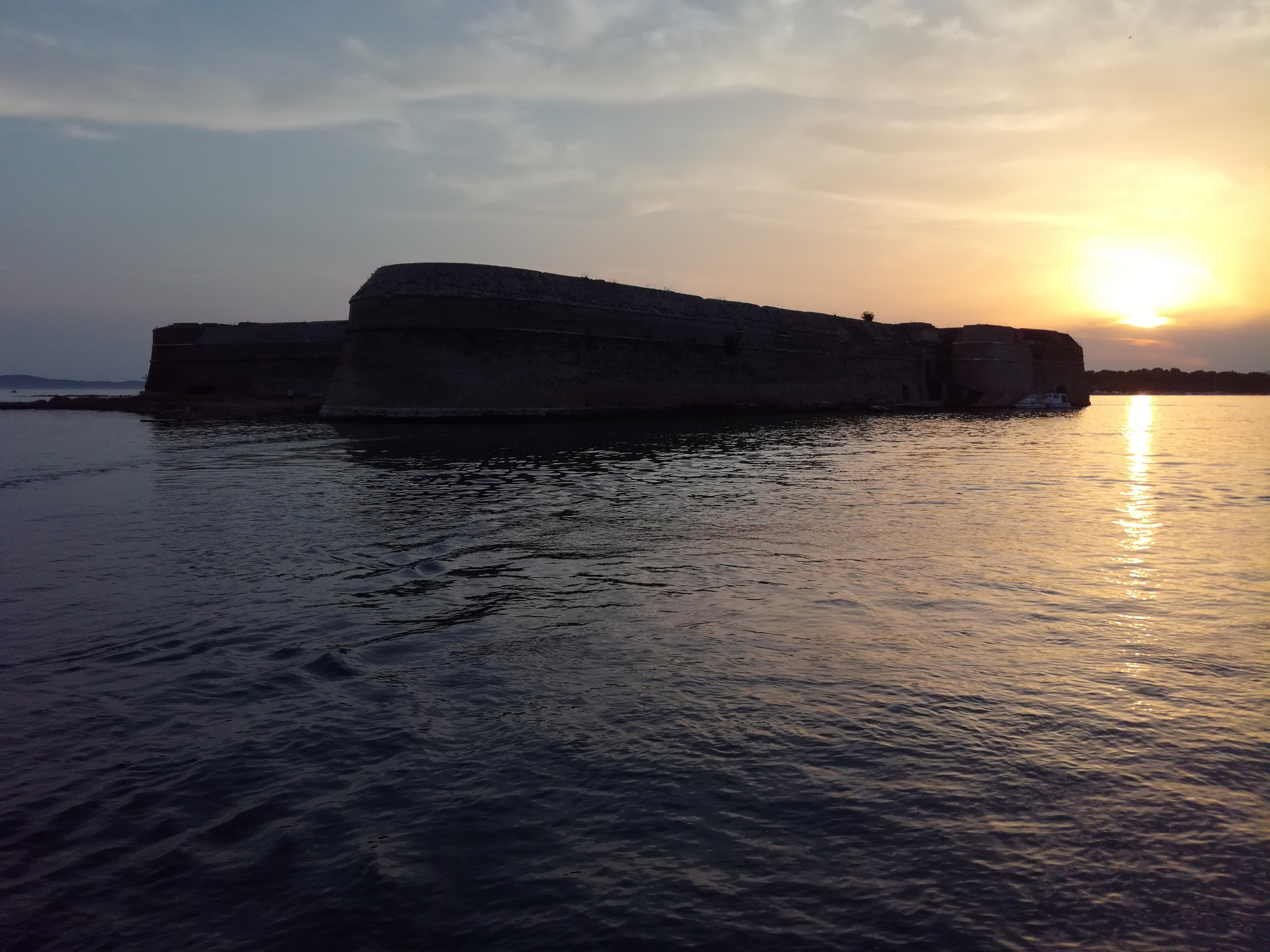
St. Nicholas' Fortress located at the entrance to the channel

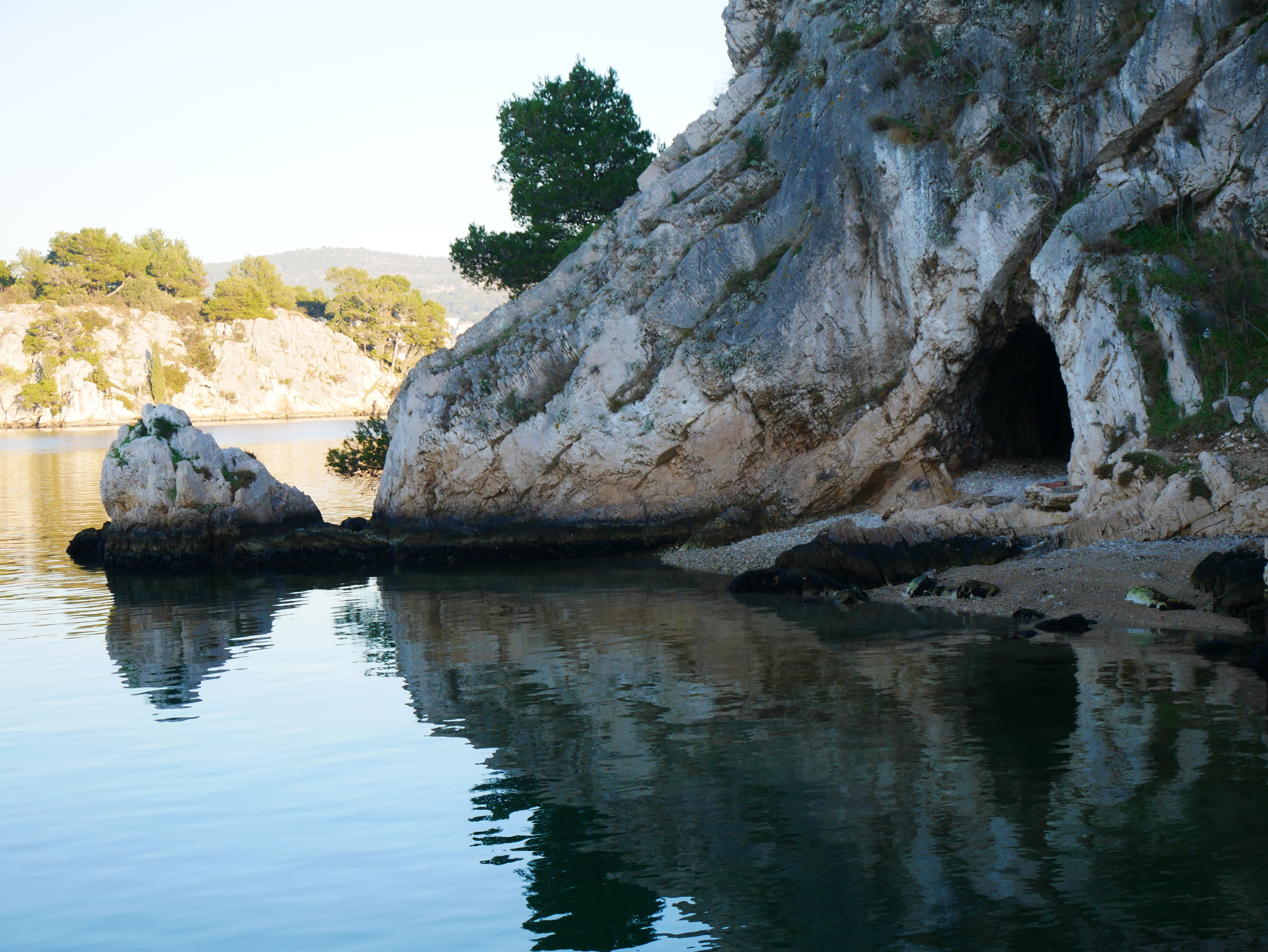
Entrance to St. Anthony Cave

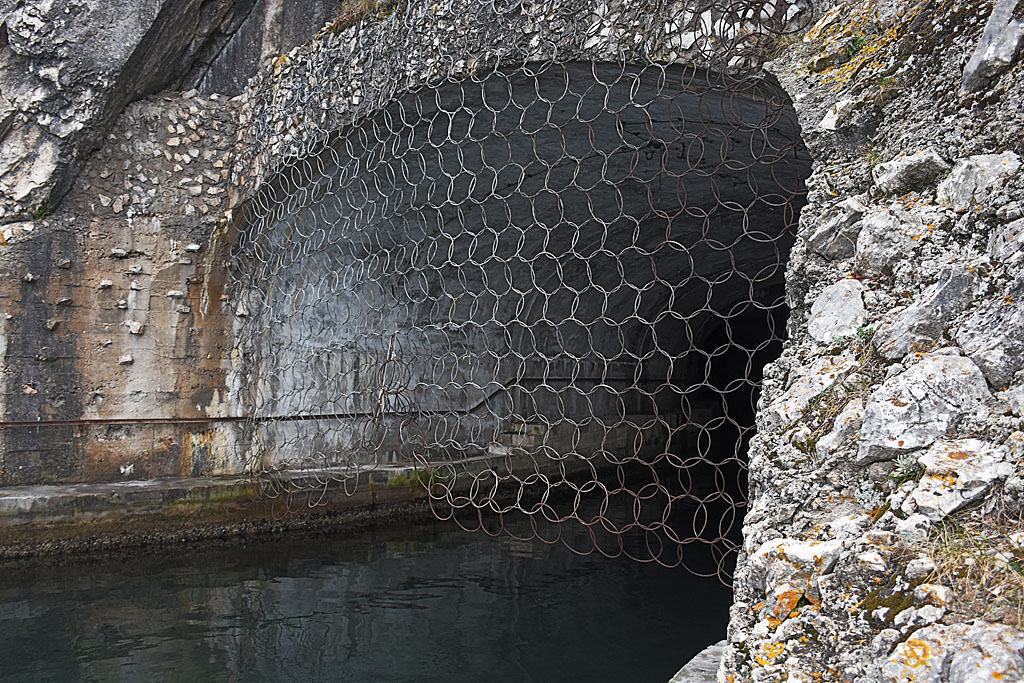
Hitler's Eyes

== Image gallery ==
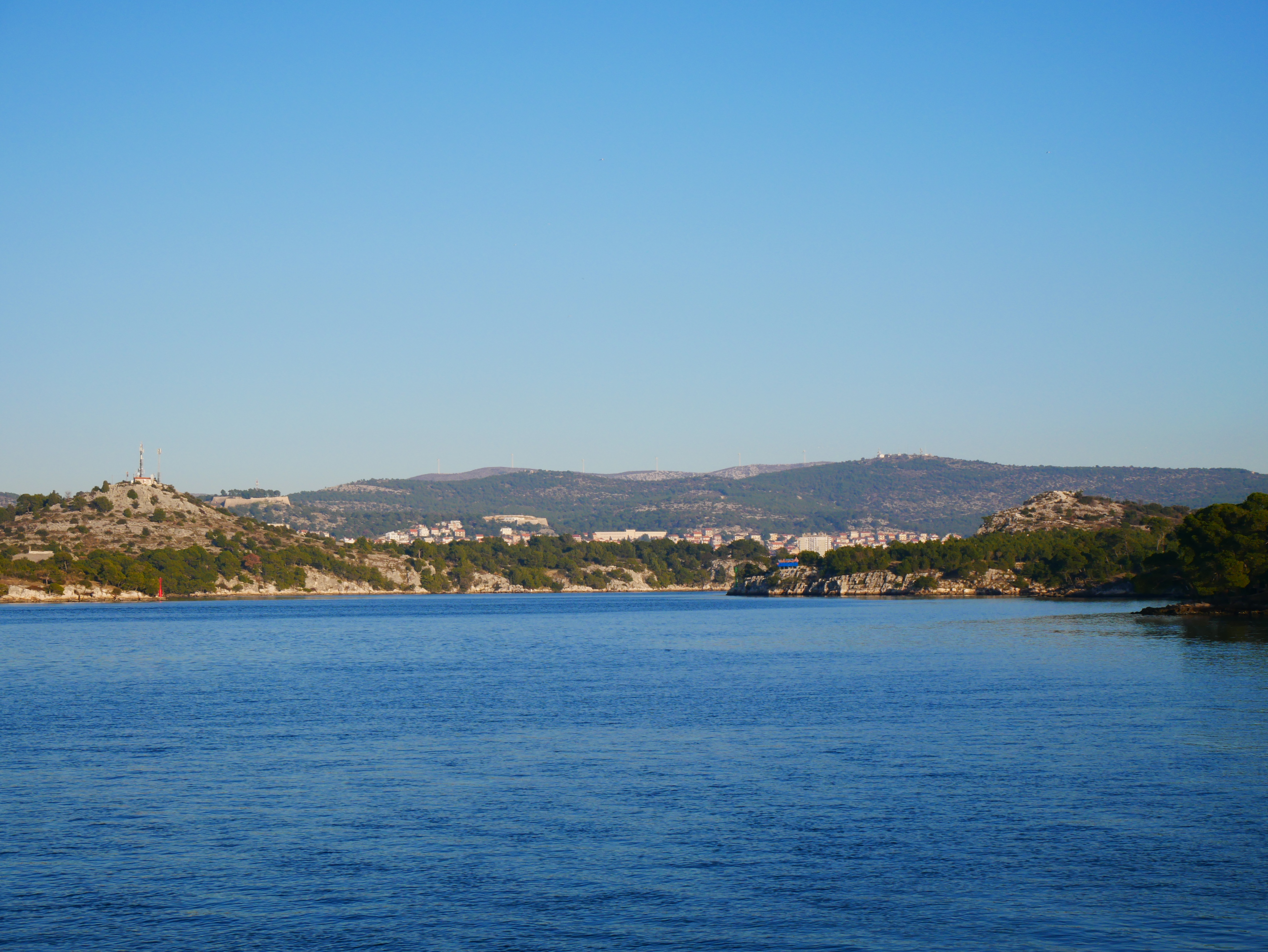
St. Anthony Channel

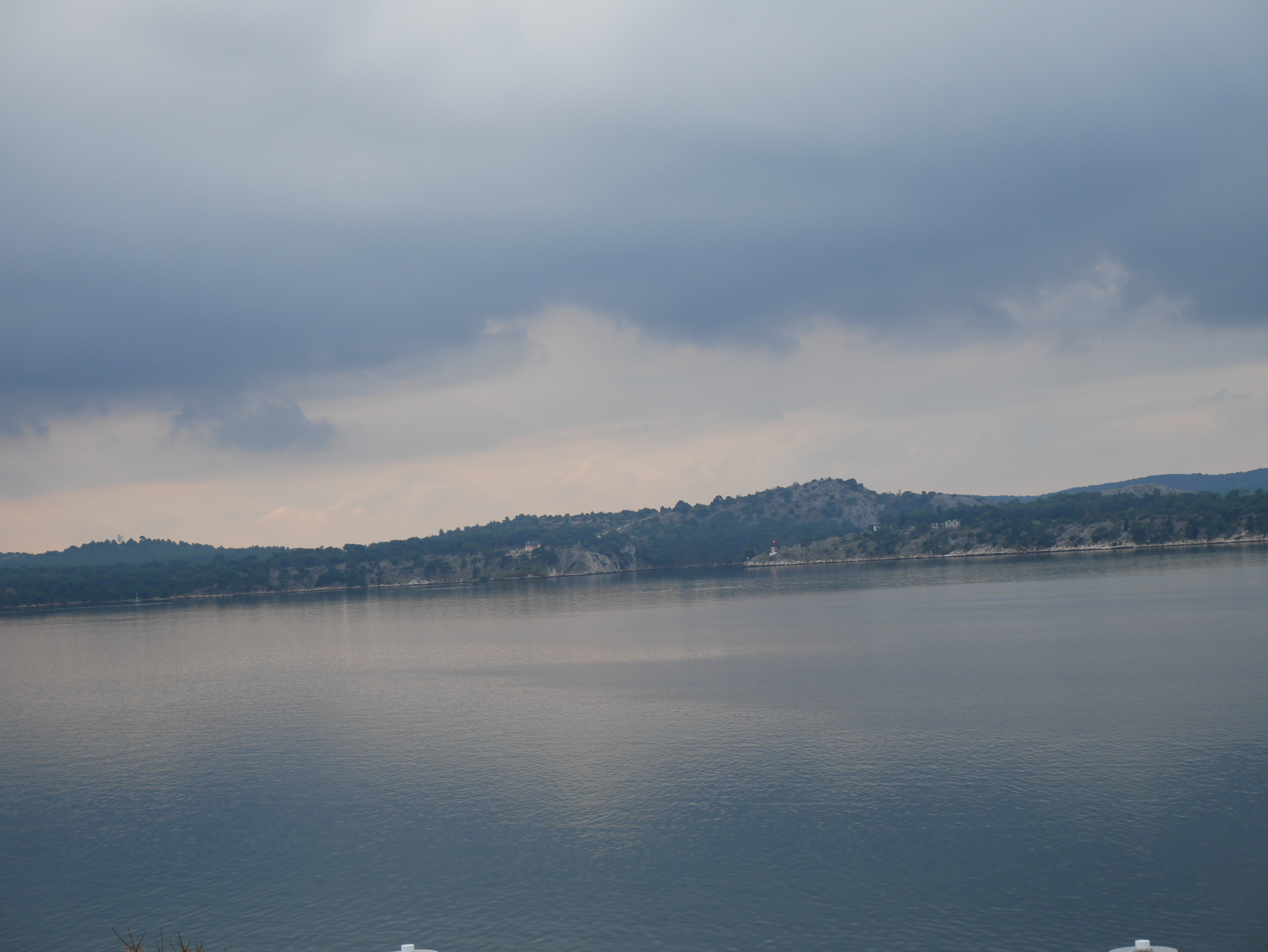
View from Banj beach

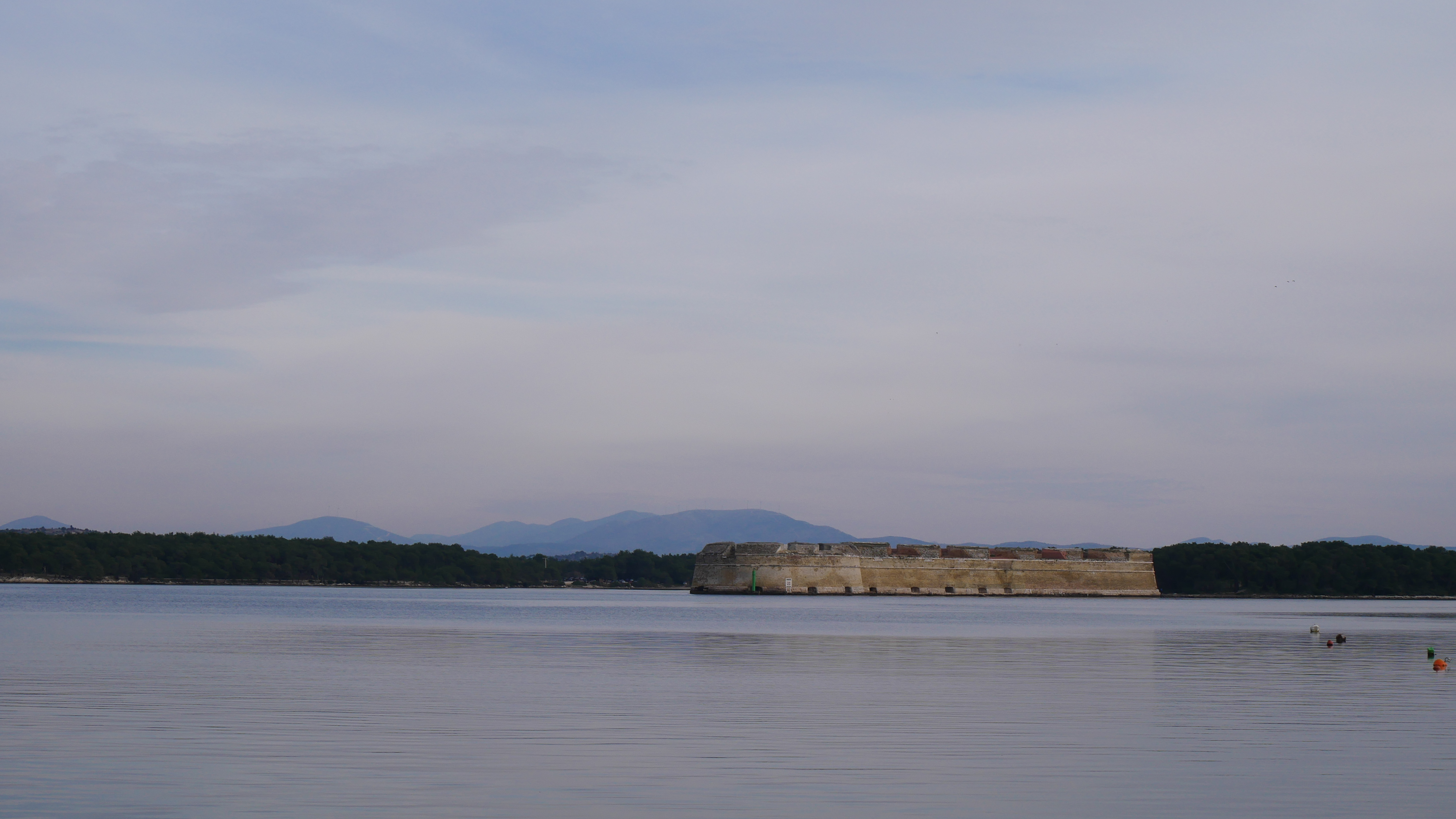
View of St. Nicholas Fortress from Jadrija

St Nicholas Fortress

View from St. Michael's Fortress, Šibenik

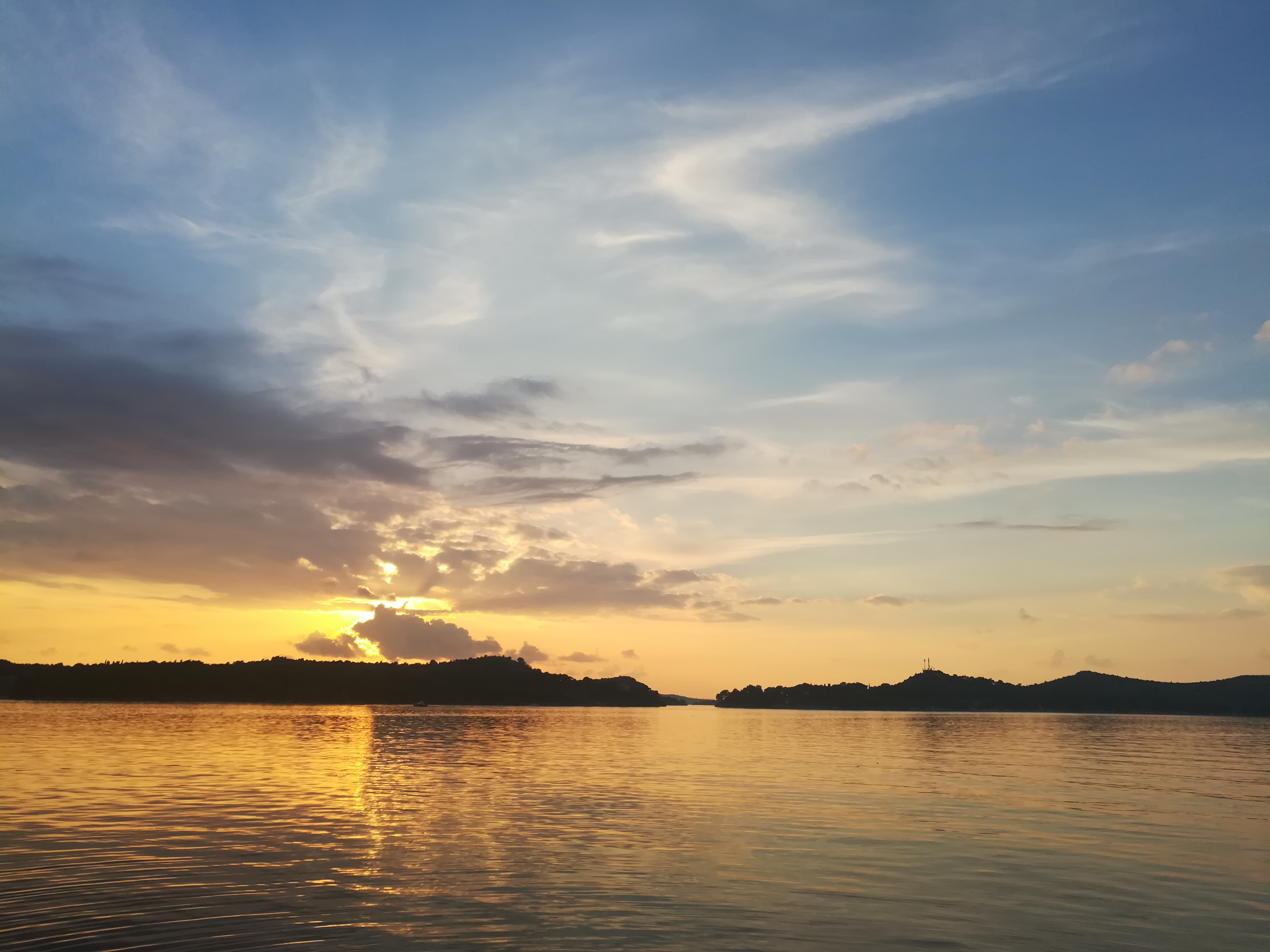
St. Anthony channel sunset

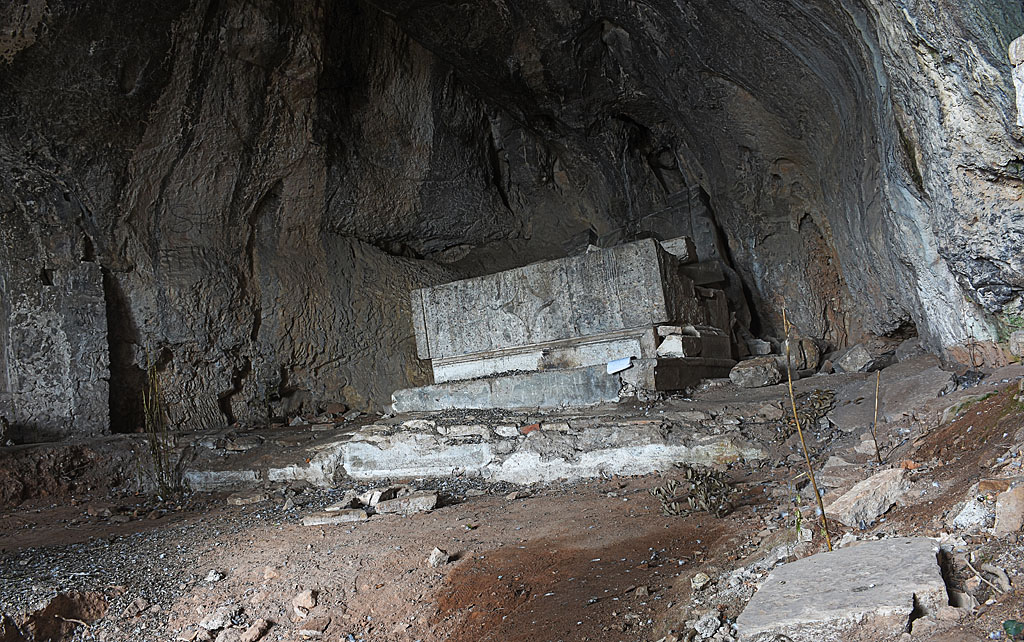
St. Anthony cave
