= Jadrija =

- City district
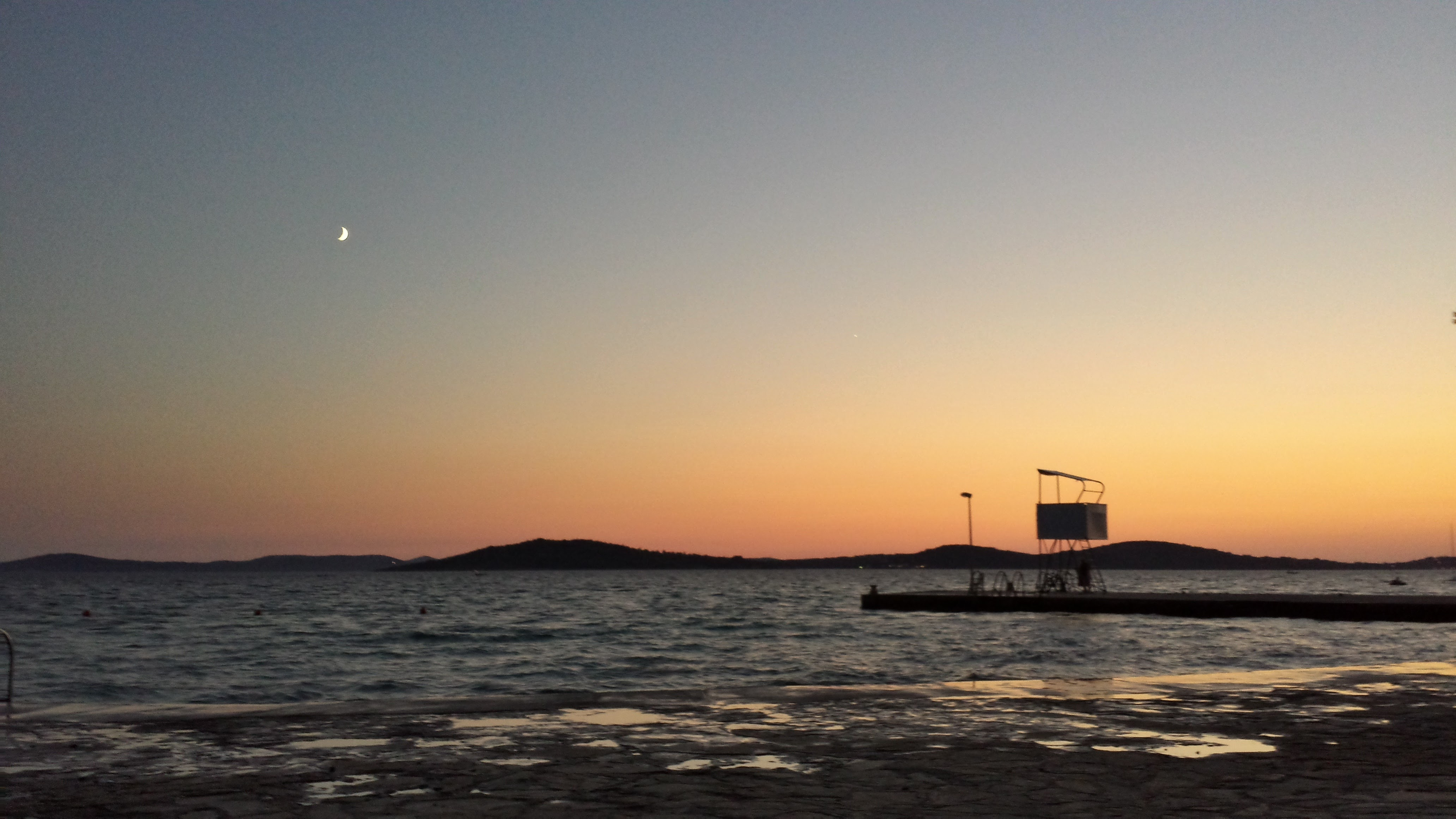
- Sunset on Jadrija

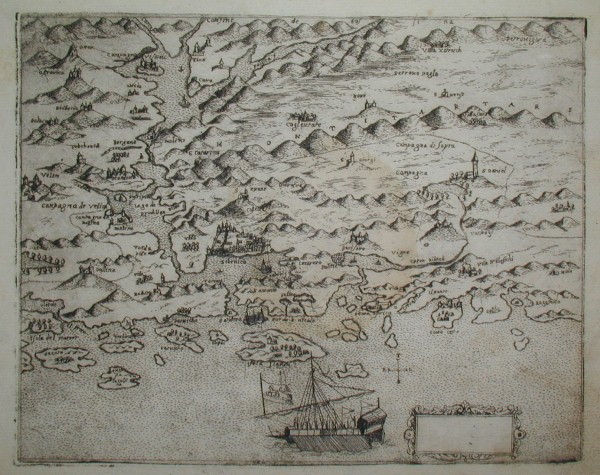
- Old city map by Martin Rota

- Location of Jadrija within Croatia
- Coordinates: 43°43′33″N 15°50′35″E
- Country: Croatia
- Region: Dalmatia
- County: Šibenik-Knin

Government
  - President of the City District Council: Joško Jurić
- Time zone: UTC+1 (CET)
  - Summer (DST): UTC+2 (CEST)
- Website: jadrija.net

Jadrija is a city district in Šibenik, Croatia, and the town's oldest official public beach. It is a popular seaside resort located on a man-made peninsula at the entrance of the St. Anthony Channel leading to Šibenik.

== History ==
Jadrija takes its name from the islet of St. Andrew (Sveti Andrija), which stood at the mouth of the channel and was connected to the mainland by landfill in the early 1920s. The town's public beach at Jadrija formally opened on 6 August 1922, an initiative of Šime Grubišić-Rovilo, Šibenik's first tourist guide, and originally comprised 25 men's and 25 women's changing cabins. The site's dense pine forest and shade were the work of another local resident, Ante Frua, known for extensive tree-planting around Šibenik. In August 2022, the beach's centenary was marked with a memorial plaque to its founders and a mural by Toni Živković depicting an old ship bearing the Jadrija name.

Jadrija's brightly coloured changing cabins, still in place today, have become one of the visual symbols of Šibenik.

== Lighthouse and cultural heritage ==
The lighthouse at the end of the peninsula was built in 1871 by the Austro-Hungarian Naval Command as part of a wider programme of lighthouse and port construction along the eastern Adriatic coast, and is considered the first modern lighthouse in the Šibenik area. Its 100th and 140th anniversaries, in 1971 and 2011, were marked with commemorative postal issues. The lighthouse's east wall carries stone portrait-sculptures of medieval Šibenik aristocrats, originally removed from Šibenik Cathedral (a UNESCO World Heritage Site since 1979) during its restoration and relocated here. The lighthouse remains functional today, acting as a traffic signal for the narrow St. Anthony Channel, which admits only one large vessel at a time; from it, visitors can see St. Nicholas Fortress, built by the Venetians between 1535 and 1550 and inscribed, as part of the transnational "Venetian Works of Defence between the 15th and 17th centuries", as a UNESCO World Heritage Site in 2017.

Jadrija's cabins and lighthouse were entered in the Register of Cultural Properties of the Republic of Croatia by a Ministry of Culture decision of 12 July 2017.

== Preservation and redevelopment ==
A building permit for a "facsimile" (like-for-like) reconstruction of the historic cabins was issued on 11 March 2019, following completion of the main renovation project. As of 2023 the renovation was being funded through Croatia's National Recovery and Resilience Plan (NPOO), under a call for the "regional diversification and specialisation of Croatian tourism through investment in high-value-added tourist products", with the project managed by the public institution JU Sportski objekti. Local press has criticised the roughly three-decade delay in restoring the cabins and a lack of public consultation over the redevelopment plans.

== Present day ==
Jadrija remains administratively one of Šibenik's city districts; as of the 2023–2027 mandate its council is chaired by Joško Jurić. The area today holds around 500 houses and cottages, most used as summer residences, and has only a small number of permanent residents.

== Recreation ==
Jadrija is one of the best places in Croatia to wind surf; many locals have their summerhouses here. Nearby towns including Vodice and Srima, and nearby islands including Prvić, Zlarin, Kaprije and Žirje are ideal for day trips going by public boat from Šibenik.

The closest national park is the Krka National Park.

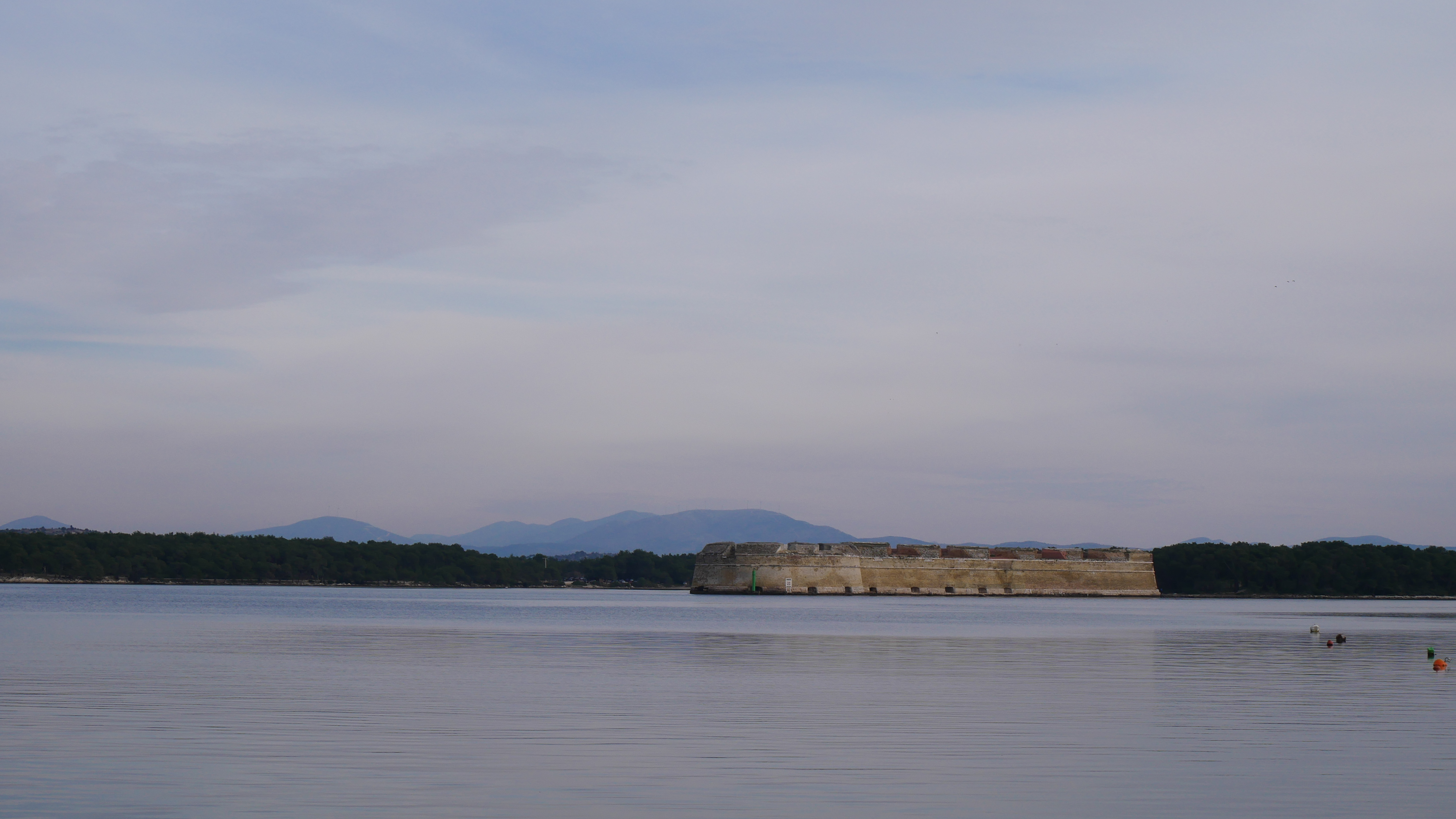
View of St. Nicholas Fortress from Jadrija

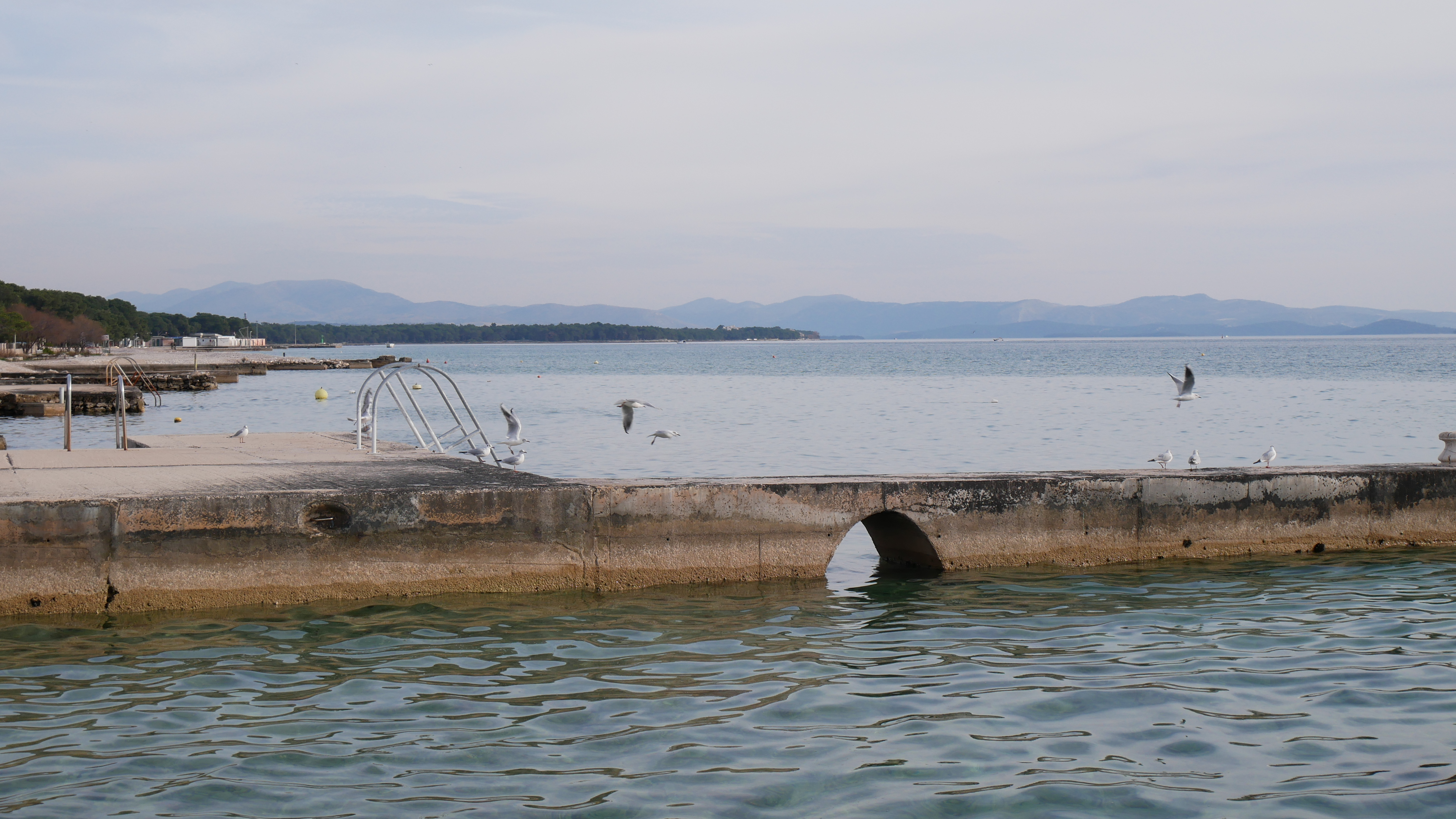
Gulls on Jadrija
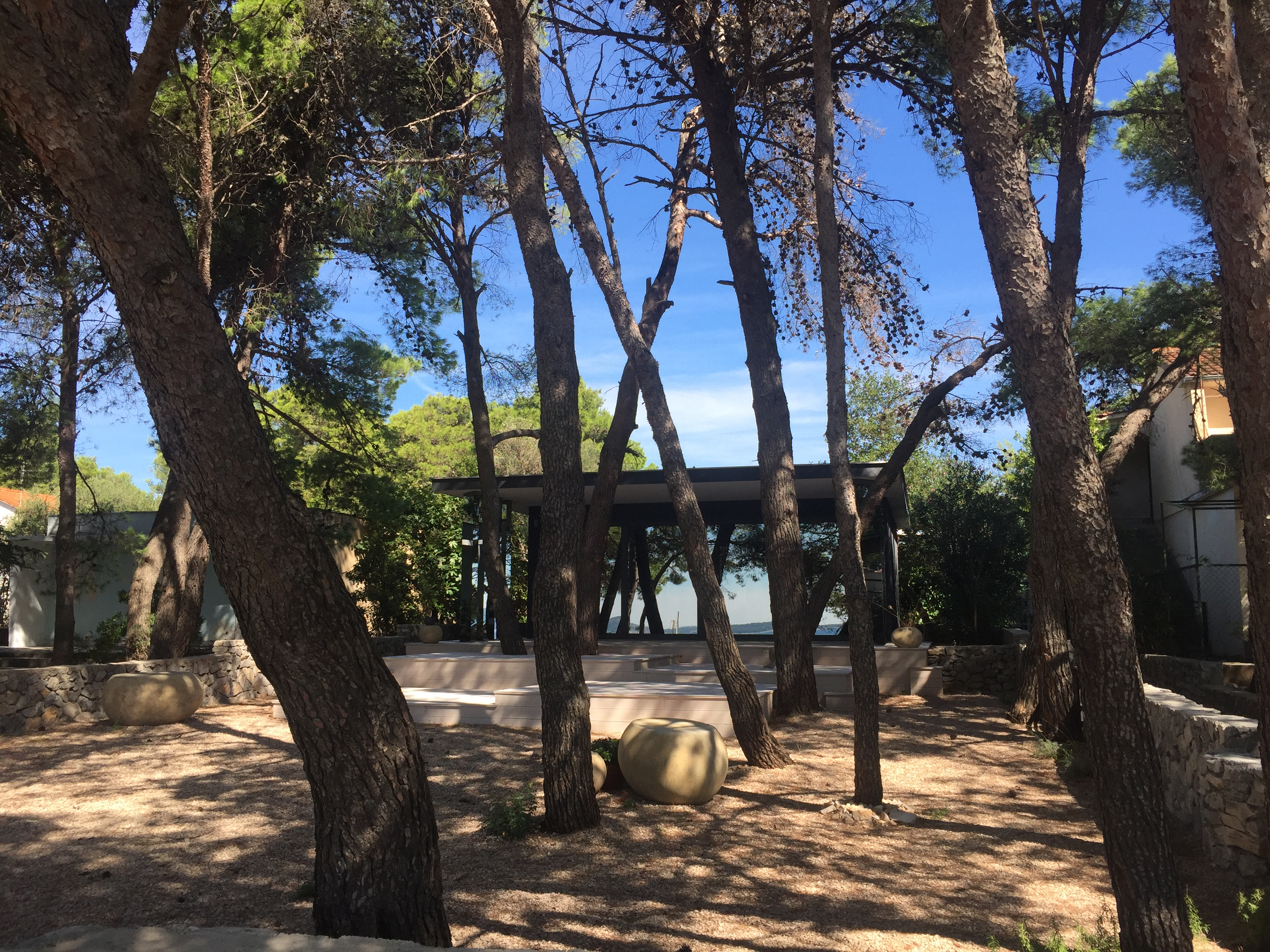

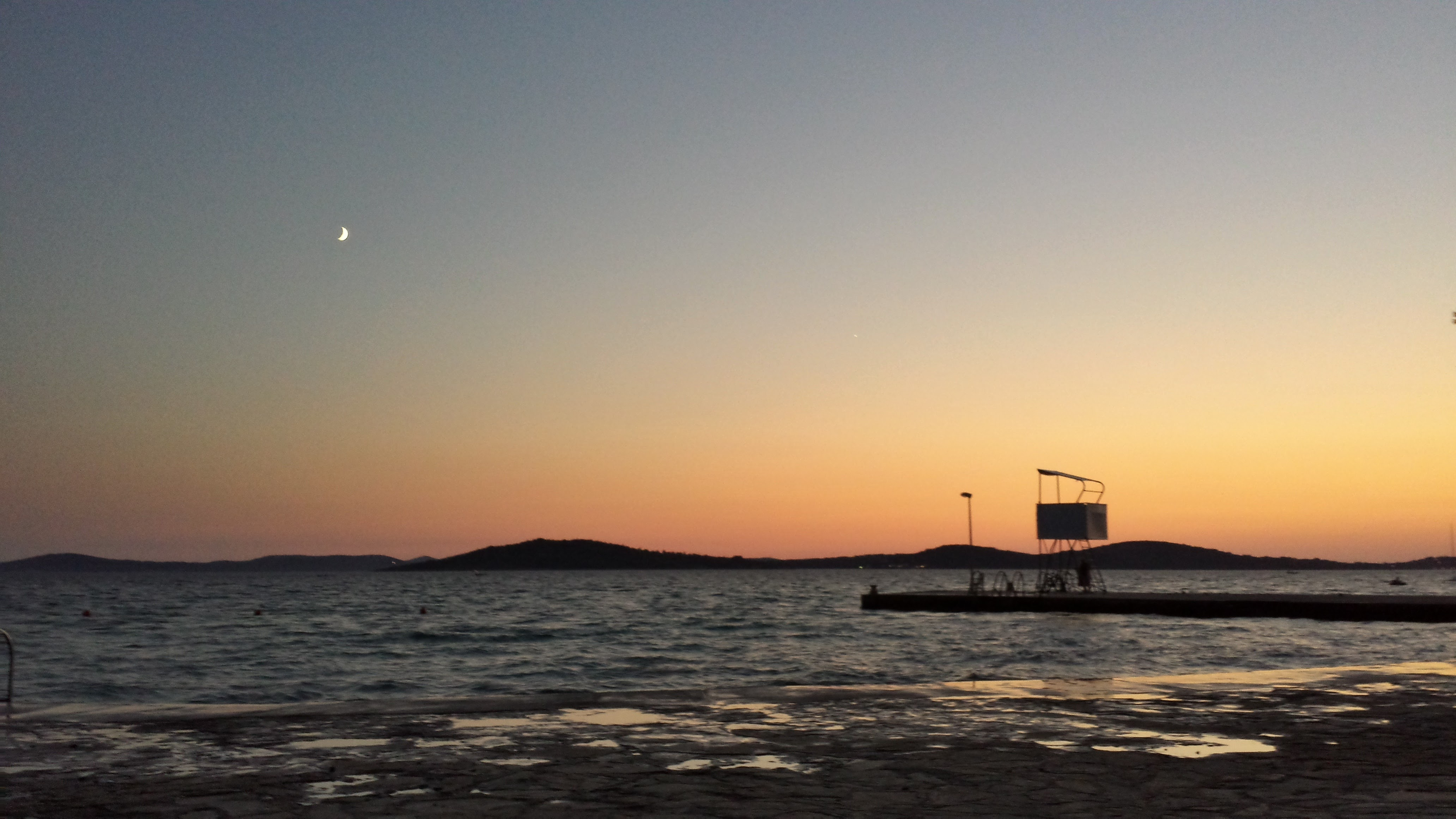

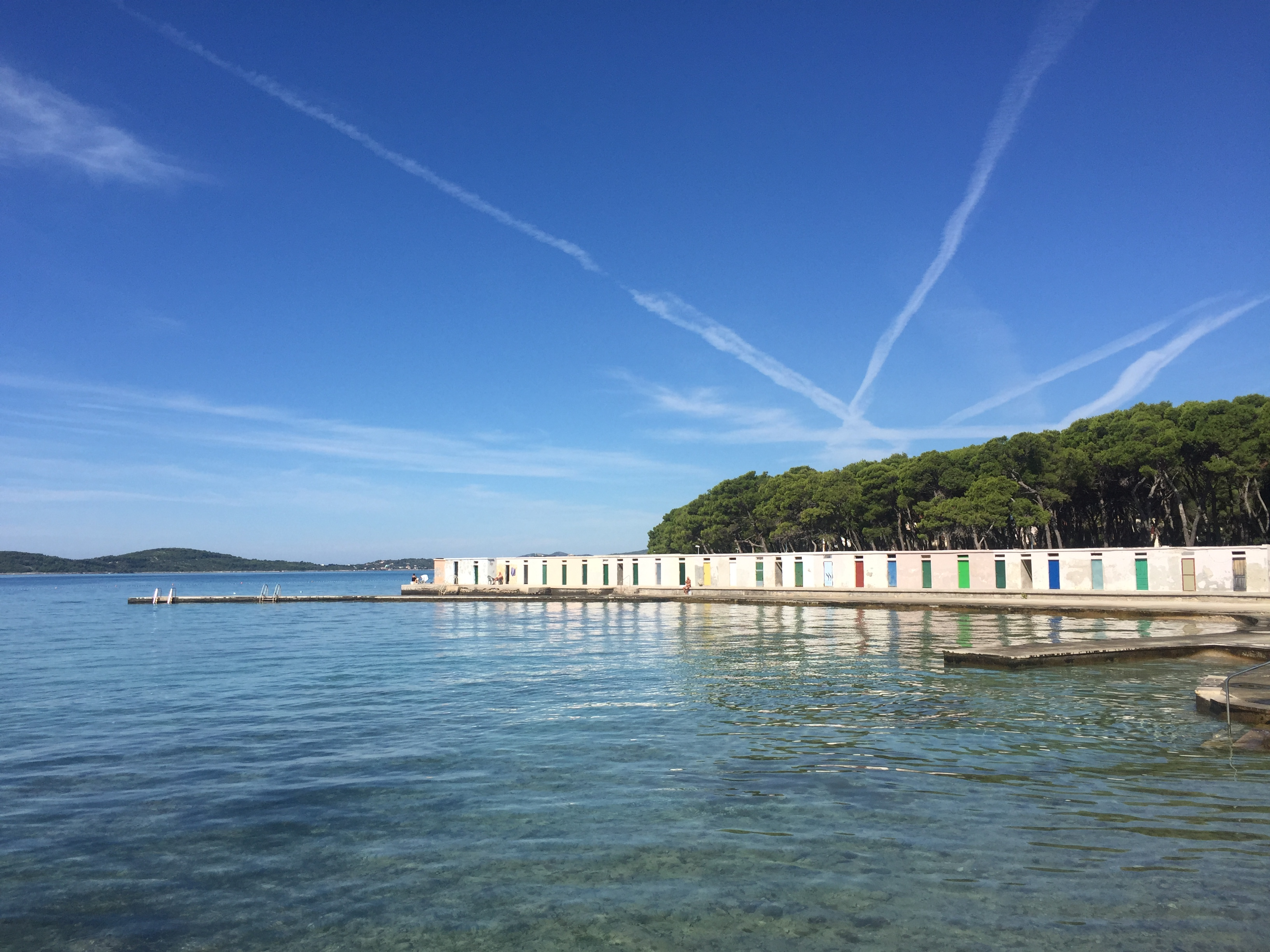

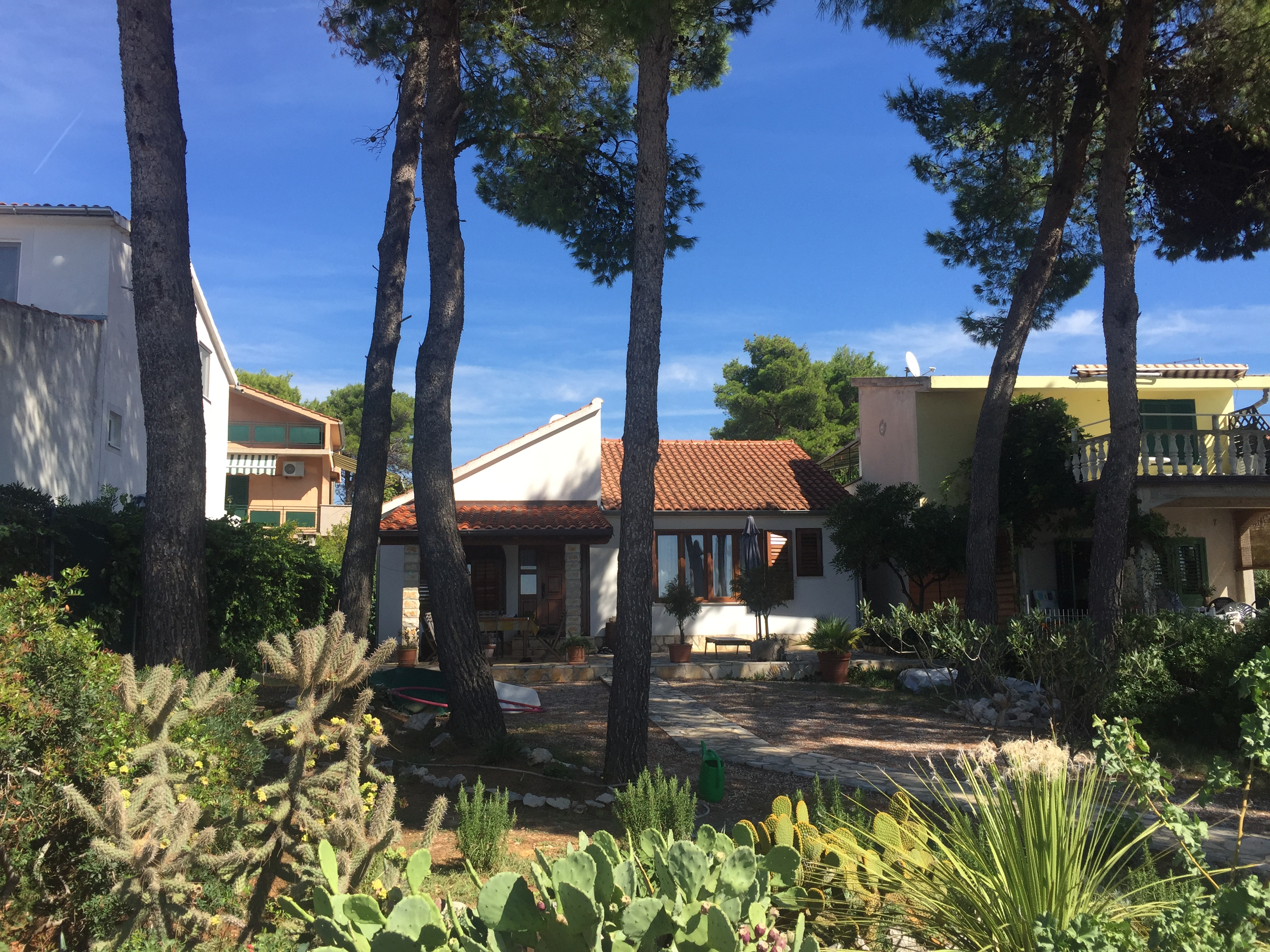

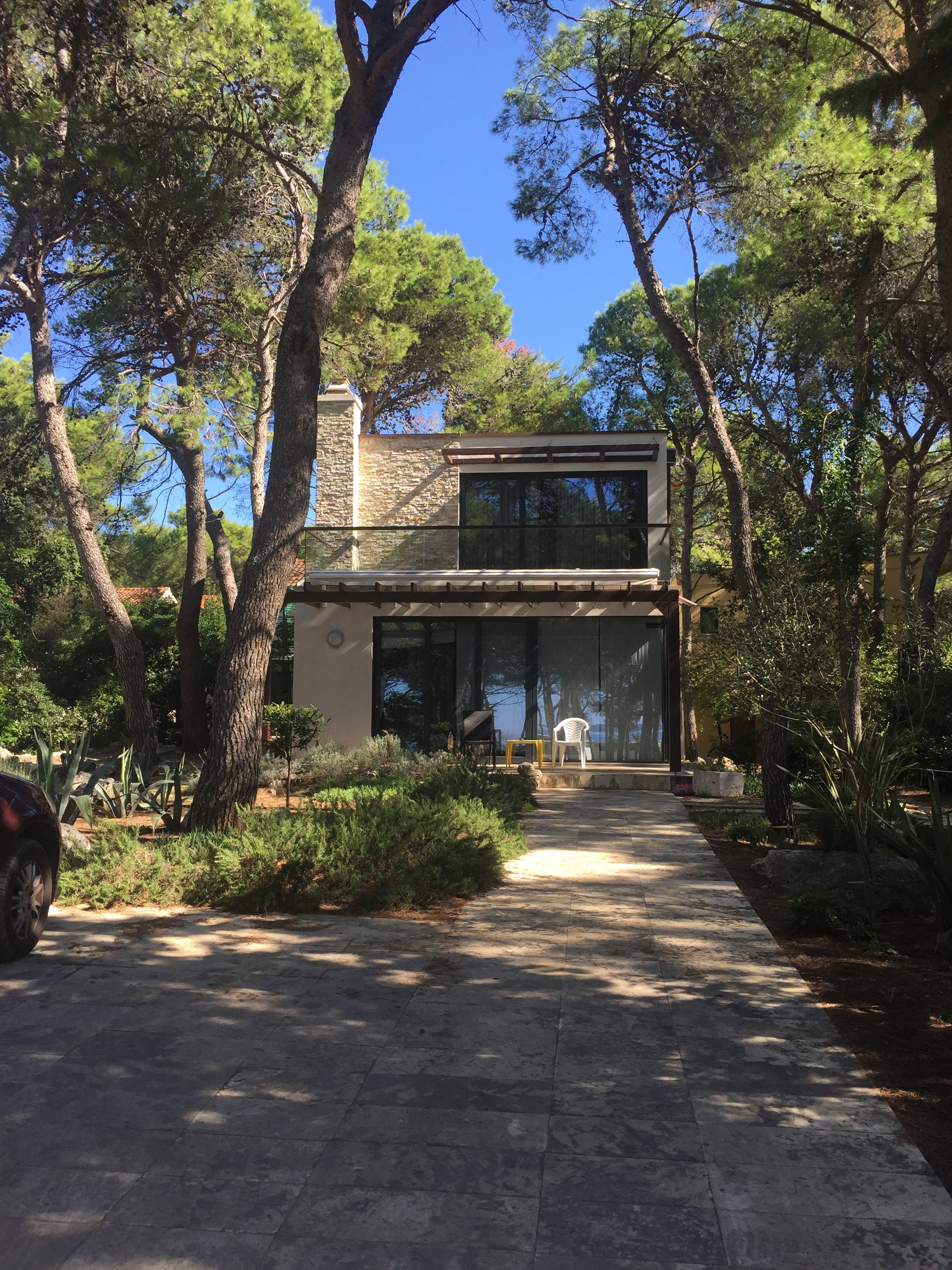

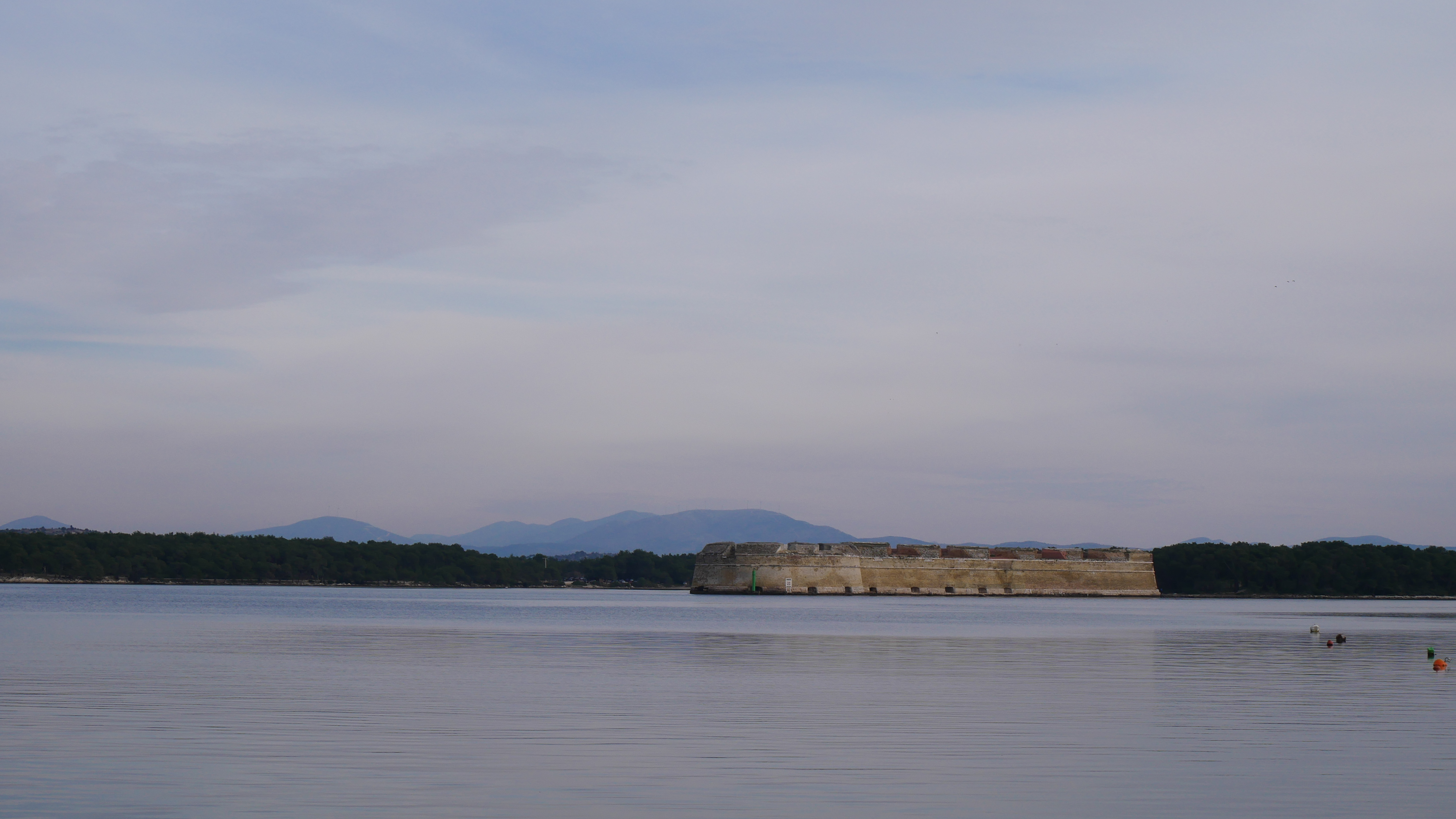
