= Venetian Works of Defence between the 16th and 17th centuries: Stato da Terra – Western Stato da Mar =

Venetian Works of Defence between the 16th and 17th Centuries: Stato da Terra – Western Stato da Mar
UNESCO World Heritage Site
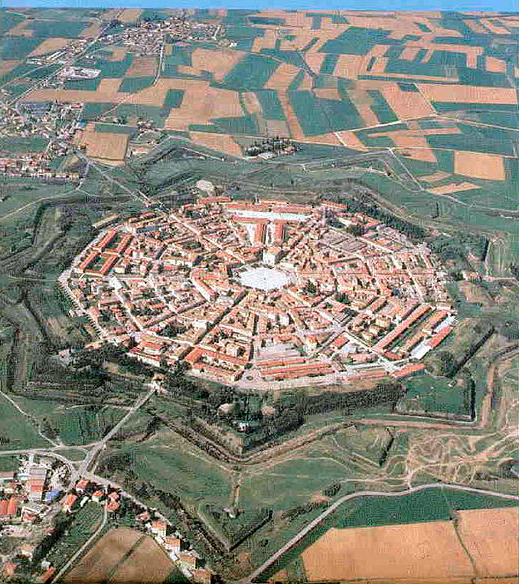
- The fortress at Palmanova, one of the 6 sites

- Location within Earth
- Location: Croatia; Italy; Montenegro
- Criteria: Cultural: (iii), (iv)
- Reference: 1533
- Inscription: 2017 (41st Session)
- Area: 378.37 ha (935.0 acres)
- Buffer zone: 1,749.62 ha (4,323.4 acres)
- Coordinates: 45°42′12″N 9°39′49″E

Venetian Works of Defence between the 16th and 17th Centuries: Stato da Terra – Western Stato da Mar is a UNESCO World Heritage Site comprising six bastion forts constructed by the Republic of Venice in its mainland territories (Stato da Terra) and maritime domains (Stato da Mar).

With the increase in firearm warfare in the early modern period of gunpowder when the cannon came to dominate the battlefield, came significant shifts in military strategy and fort design. One of these changes was the development of the bastion fort, or alla moderna fortifications, with a polygon-shaped fortress with bulwarks at the corners. These designs originated from the Republic of Venice, but would soon spread throughout Europe and remain the standard for defence until the 19th century. In 2017, six of these fortifications in Italy, Croatia, and Montenegro were inscribed on the UNESCO World Heritage list. These six sites provide quintessential examples of this fort design, demonstrate the influence of Renaissance-era Venice, and pay testimony to a major advancement in the history of warfare.

== The heritage sites ==
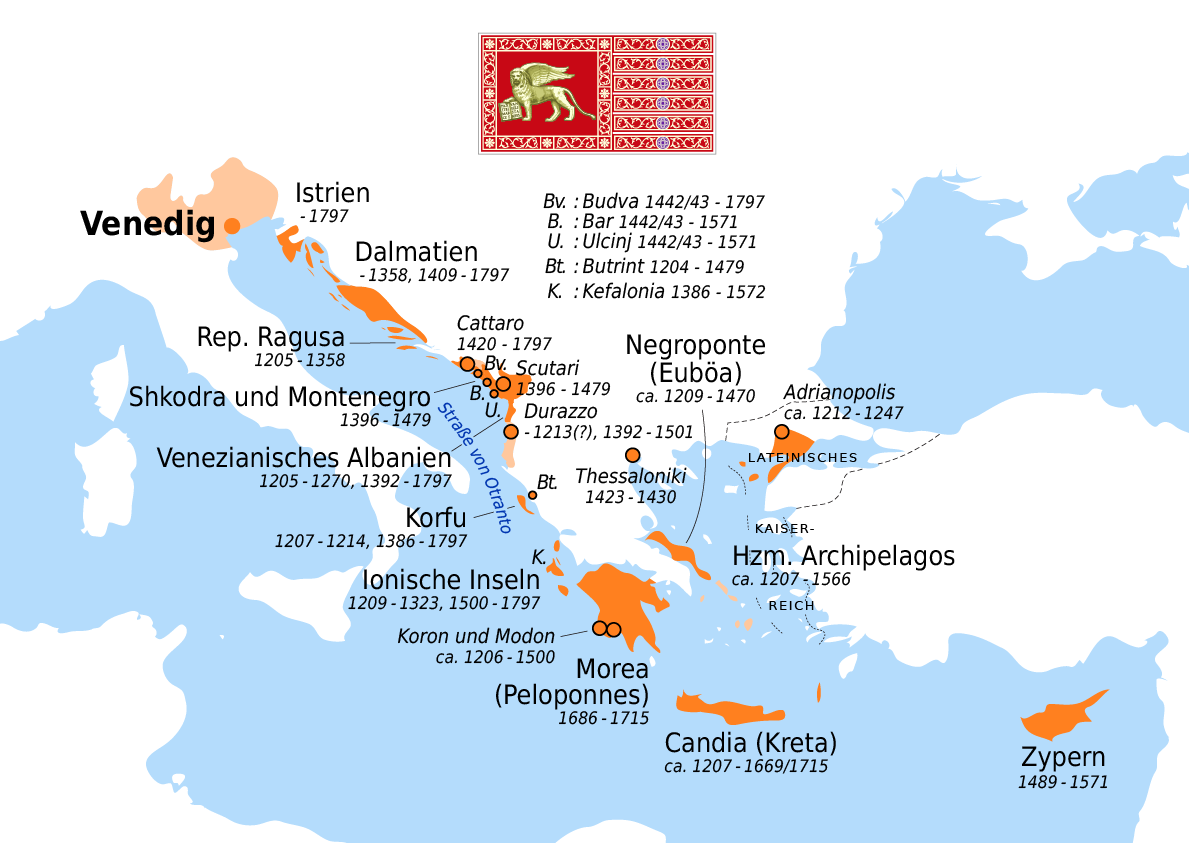
The extent of the Republic of Venice

The sites that make up the World Heritage site demonstrate the breadth of the architectural styles and fortresses employed by the Venetians. Built in the 15th century, the fortified town of Kotor is the oldest site, displaying a transitional period between traditional fortress design and alla moderna design. In the 16th century, the fortifications in Bergamo and the Fort of St. Nikola were built, showing the addition of a more complex and centralized system of bastions, walls, and moats. The defences at Zadar, Peschiera del Garda, and Palmanova were completed in the 17th century.

Site	Image	Location
Fortified City of Bergamo		Bergamo, Lombardy, Italy; 45°42′12″N 9°39′49″E
Fortified City of Peschiera del Garda		Peschiera del Garda, Veneto, Italy; 45°26′20″N 10°41′39″E
City Fortress of Palmanova		Palmanova, Friuli-Venezia Giulia, Italy; 45°54′22″N 13°18′35″E
Defensive System of Zadar		Zadar, Zadar County, Croatia; 44°6′42″N 15°13′49″E
Fort of St. Nikola, Šibenik-Knin County		Šibenik, Šibenik-Knin County, Croatia; 43°43′17″N 15°51′17″E
Fortified City of Kotor		Kotor Municipality, Montenegro; 42°25′25″N 18°46′19″E

== See also ==
- Bastion fort
