= St. Nicholas Fortress =

Fortress near the town of Šibenik, Croatia

St. Nicholas Fortress Tvrđava sv. Nikole
- Šibenik, Croatia
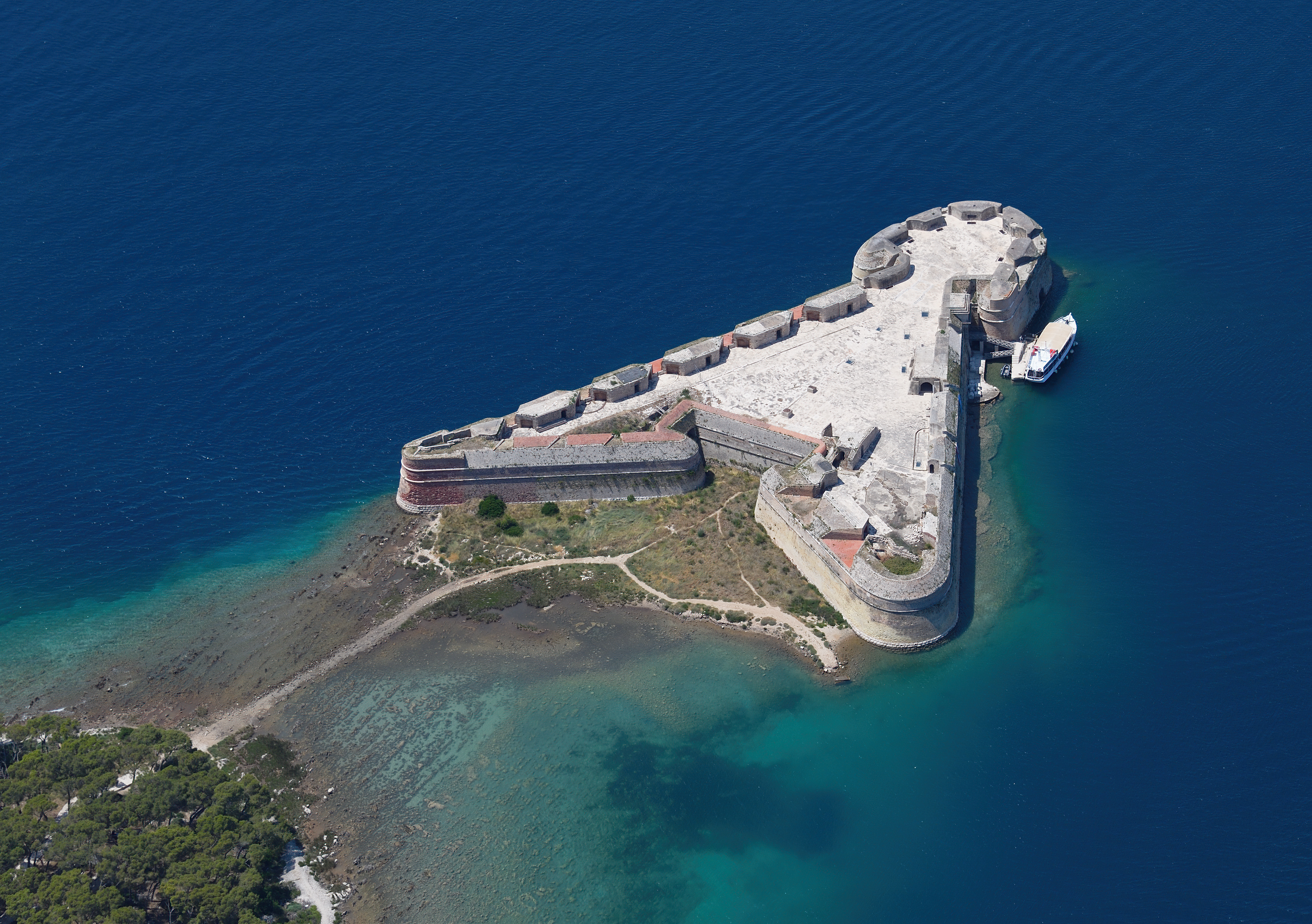

Site information
- Type: Fortress
- Owner: Šibenik, Croatia
- Open to the public: Yes
- Condition: Preserved

Location
- Coordinates: 43.7215°N 15.8547°E

Site history
- Built: 1540.-1547.
- Built by: Hyeronimus di San Michaela
- Materials: Limestone

UNESCO World Heritage Site
- Type: Cultural
- Criteria: iii, iv
- Designated: 2017 (41 Session)
- Part of: Venetian Works of Defence between 15th and 17th centuries: Stato da Terra – western Stato da Mar
- Reference no.: 1533
- Region: Europe and North America

St. Nicholas Fortress (Croatian: Tvrđava sv. Nikole) is a fortress located at the entrance to St. Anthony Channel, near the town of Šibenik in central Dalmatia, Croatia.

It was included in UNESCO's World Heritage Site list as part of "Venetian Works of Defence between 16th and 17th centuries: Stato da Terra – western Stato da mar" in 2017.

After reconstruction work that lasted for two years, the fortress was open to visitors in July 2019.

== History ==
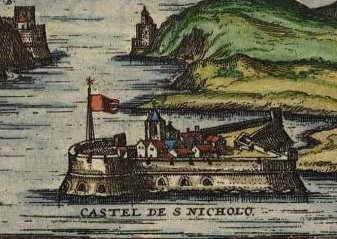
Castel de S. Nicholo

The town of Šibenik has a fortification system consisting of four fortresses:

- St. Nicholas Fortress (Tvrđava sv. Nikole)
- St. Michael's Fortress (Tvrđava sv. Mihovila)
- St. John's Fortress (Tvrđava sv. Ivana)
- Barone Fortress (Tvrđava Barone)

Only St. Nicholas Fortress is at sea, at the entrance to the Šibenik port, and the remaining three are on land.

St. Nicholas Fortress was built on the left side at the entrance to St. Anthony Channel, on the island called Ljuljevac. The island is situated at the entrance to the Šibenik channel across the Jadrija beach lighthouse. St. Nicholas Fortress got its name from the Benedictine Monastery of St. Nicholas, which was originally on the island, but due to the construction of the fortress, it had to be demolished. At the request of domestic Croat population of Šibenik, the Venetian captain Alvise Canal decided to build a fort on the island of Ljuljevac on 30 April 1525. The fortress was designed and built by the famous Venetian architect and builder Giangirolamo Sanmicheli (nephew of Michele Sanmicheli). It was built by in the 16th century to prevent Turkish boats from reaching the port. St. Nicholas Fortress was armed with 32 cannons.

== Architecture ==
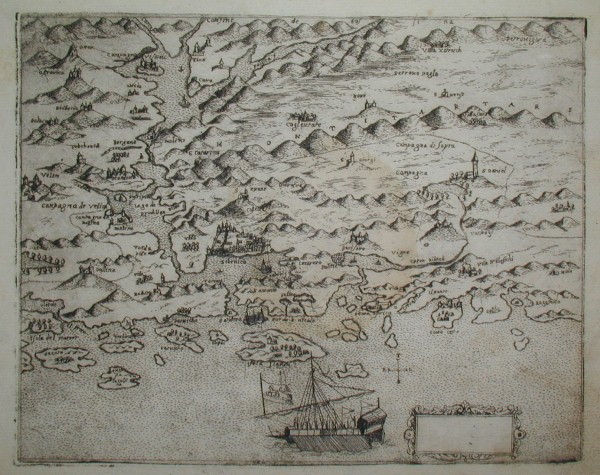
St. Nicholas Fortress is at the entrance of the St. Anthony channel on this map from 16th century.

The fortress is one of the most valuable and best preserved examples of defense architecture in Dalmatia. It is made of brick because that material was considered to be most resistant to cannonballs, while the foundations are made of stone. Although defense capabilities of the fortress have never been tested in military operations, the structure still proved successful in protecting the city from sea-bound enemy attacks. During the centuries of use, the structure served to various armies and has undergone a number of renovations, some of them necessary only because of the development of arms. It was completely abandoned by the military in 1979 and has been undergoing renovation ever since.

== Notes ==
In the Mediterranean, there are two similar forts: one on the island of Malta, and the other is in Venice, named Forte di Sant'Andrea.

== Image gallery ==
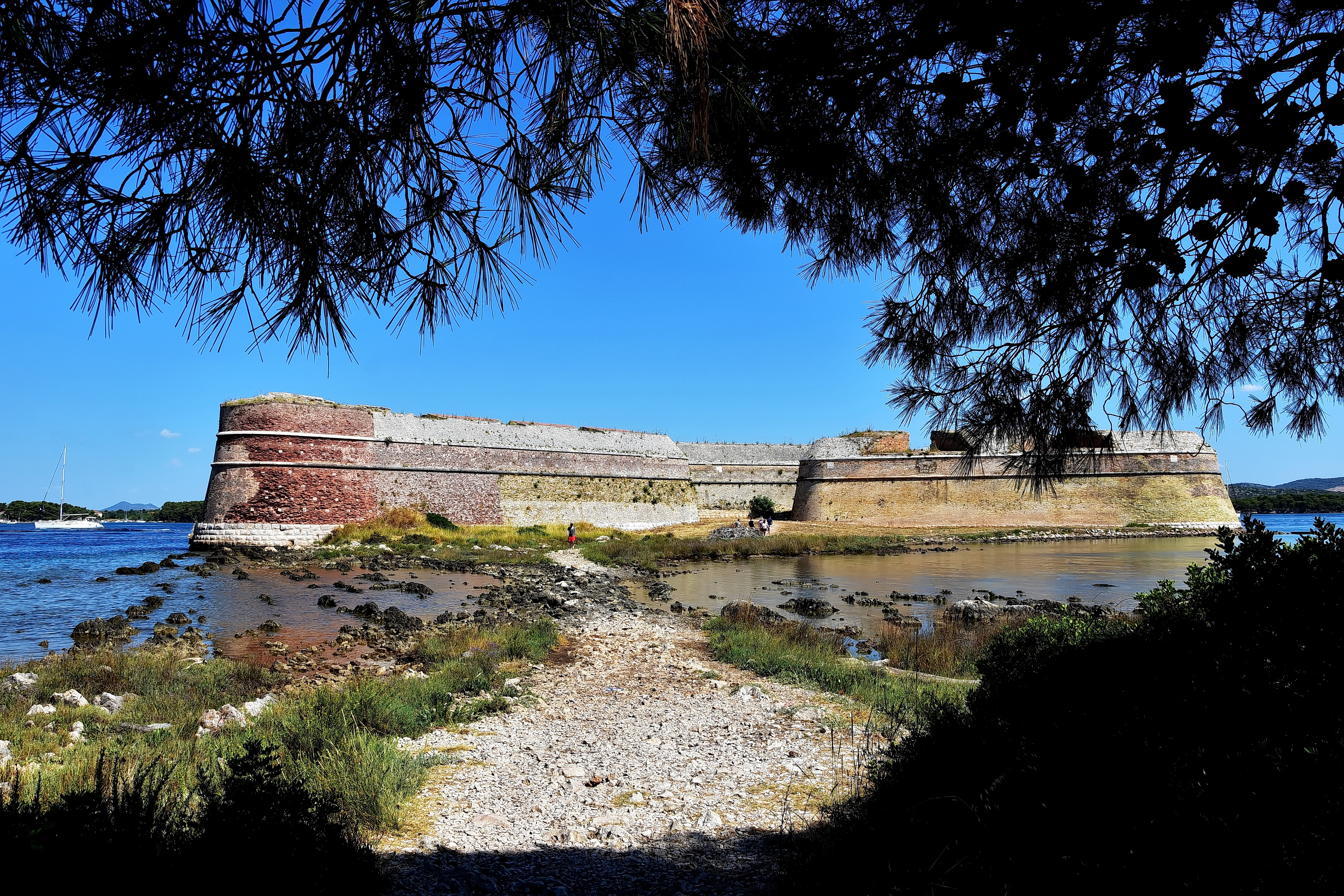

St Nicholas Fortress

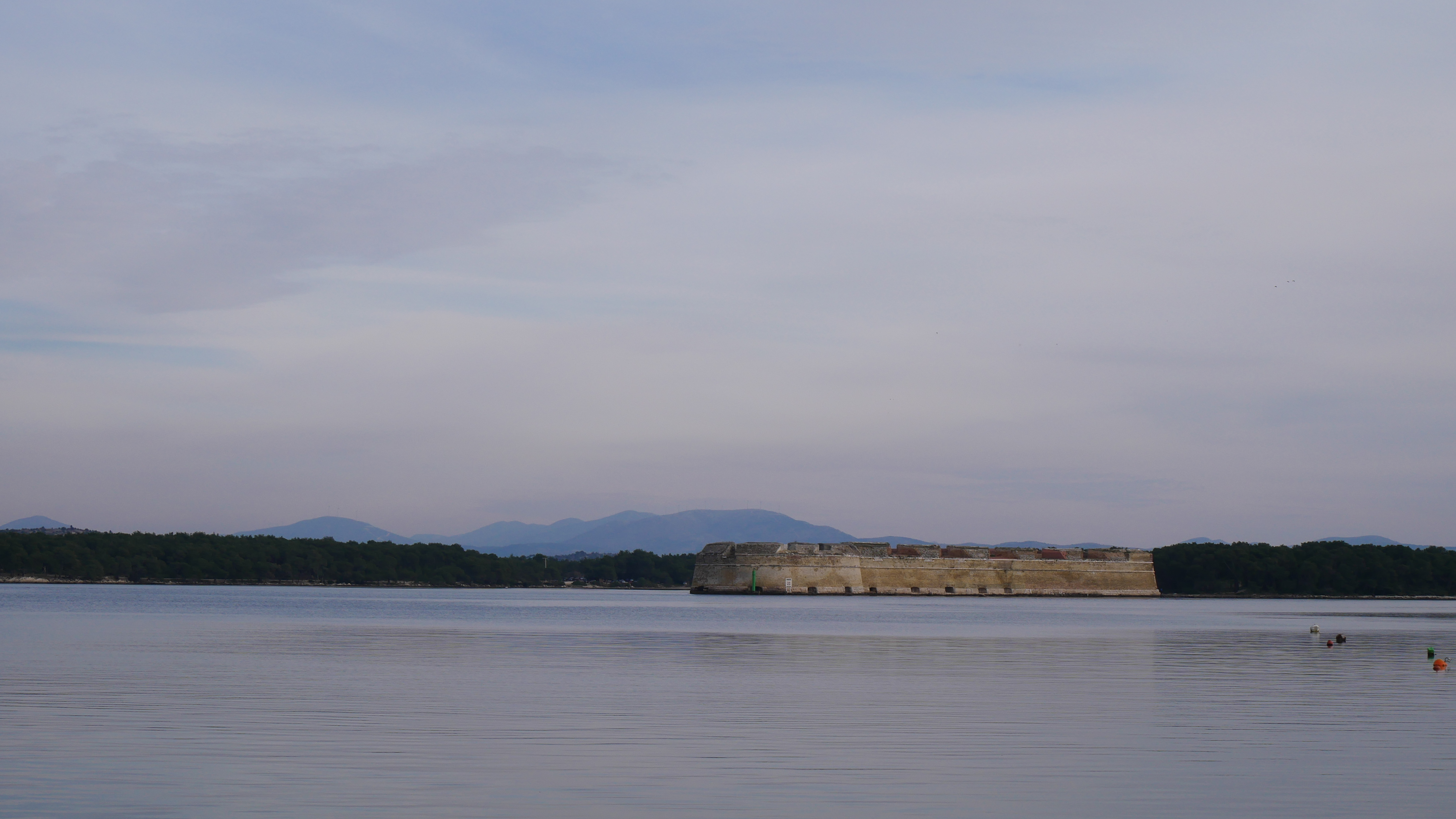
View of St. Nicholas Fortress from Jadrija

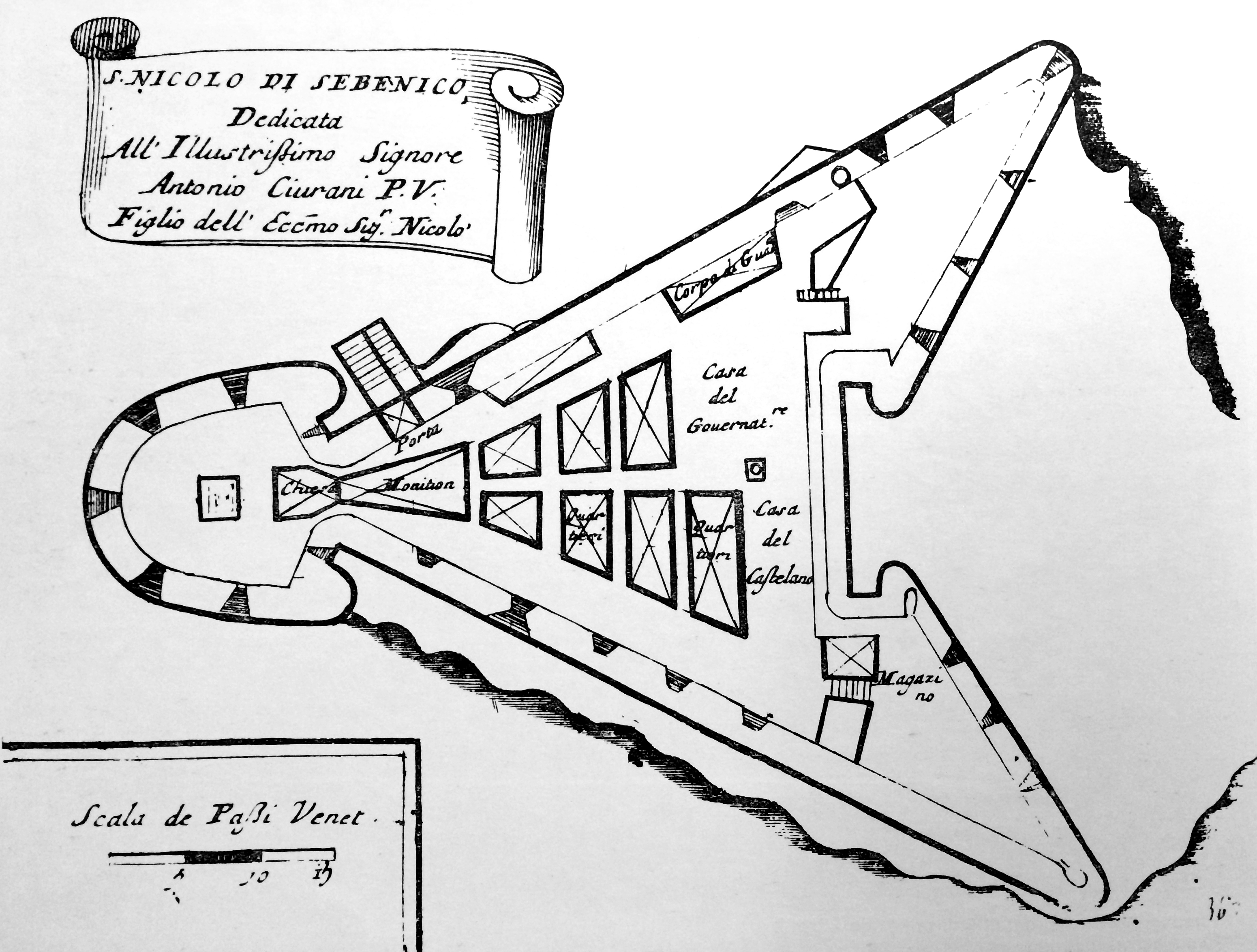

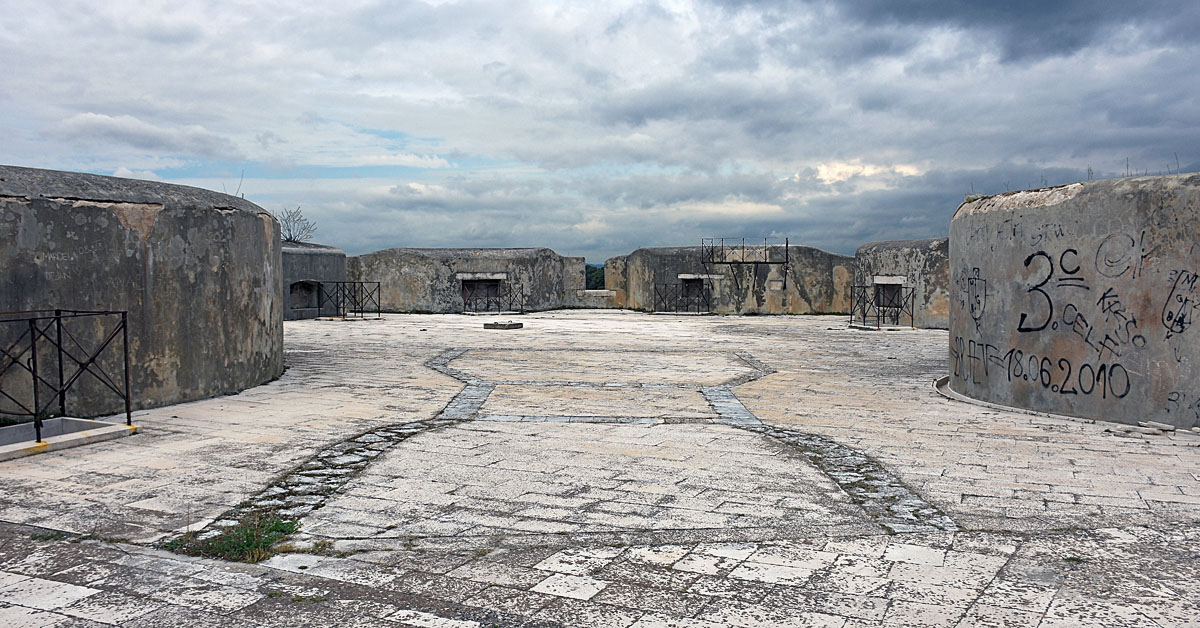
Gun posts
