= Electoral district IX (Croatian Parliament) =

- Constituency for the Croatian Parliament
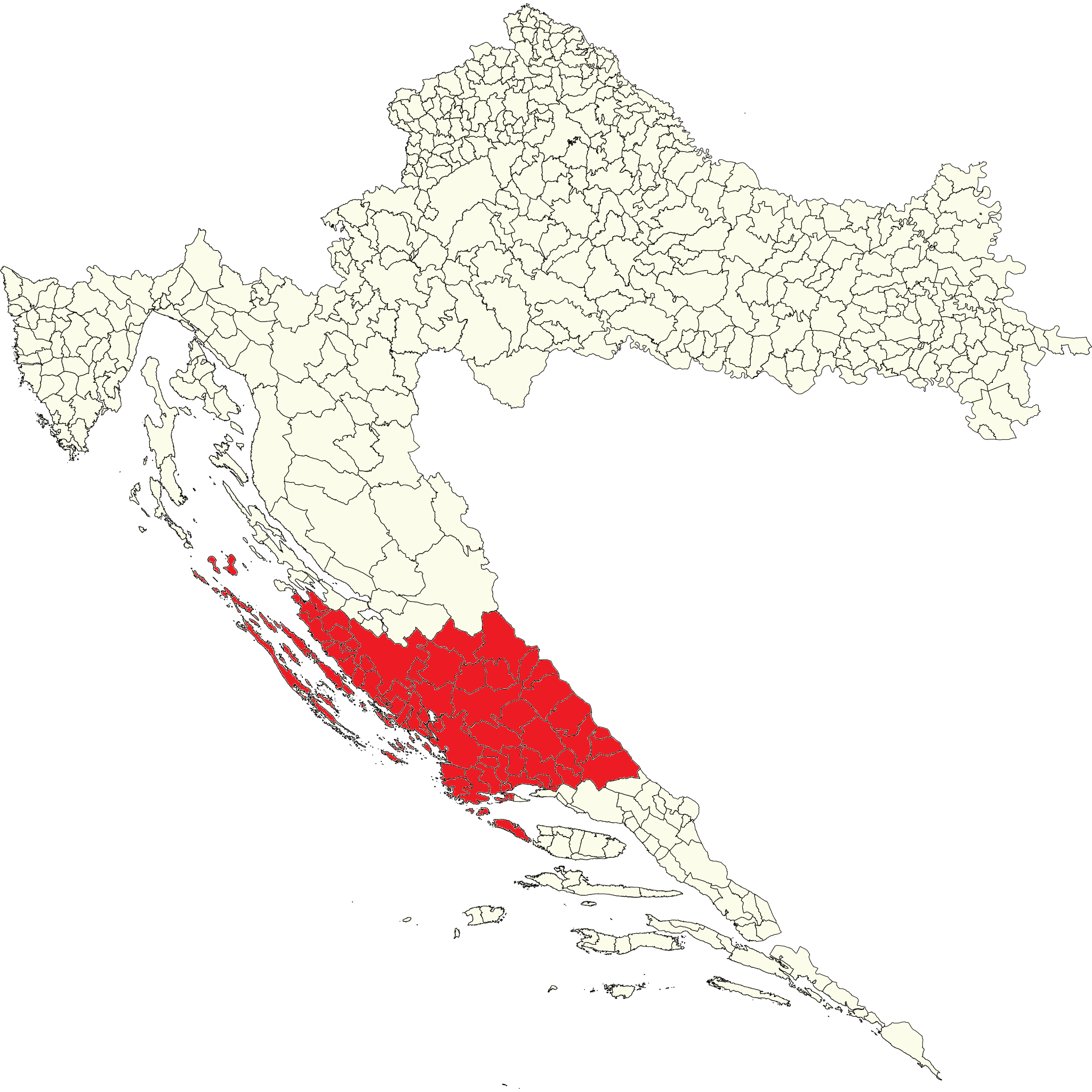
- Map of Electoral district IX (2023-present)
- Electorate: 369,755 (2025)
- Major settlements: Zadar, Šibenik, Knin, Kaštela, Solin, Sinj, Trogir

Current constituency
- Created: 2023
- Number of members: 14

Electoral district IX (Croatian: IX. izborna jedinica) is one of twelve electoral districts of the Croatian Parliament. In 2025, the district had 369,755 registered voters.

== Boundaries ==
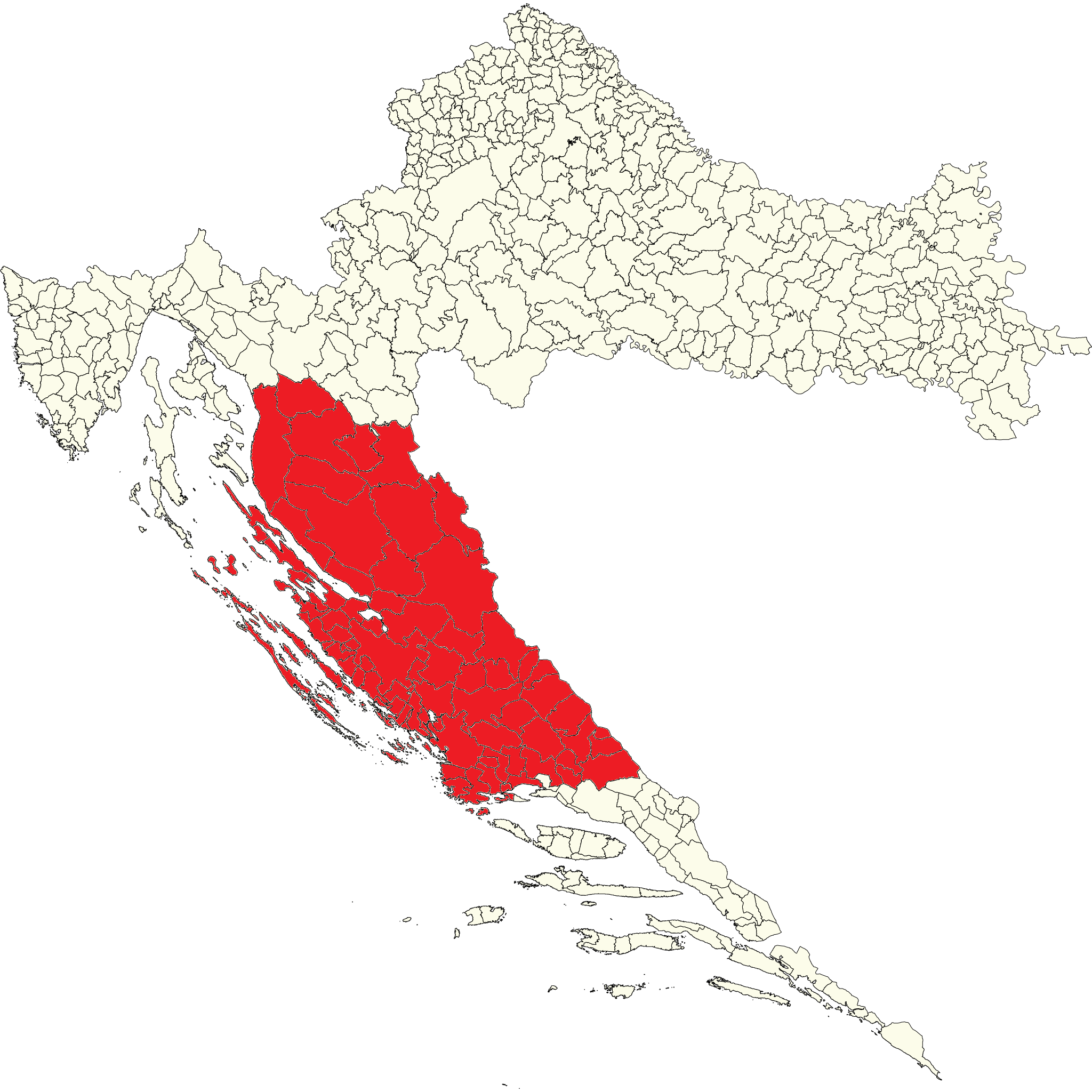
Electoral district IX (1999-2023)

=== Creation ===
From 1999 to 2023, electoral district IX consisted of:

- The whole Lika-Senj County;
- The whole Zadar County;
- The whole Šibenik-Knin County;
- The northern part of Split-Dalmatia County including the cities and municipalities: Dicmo, Dugopolje, Hrvace, Kaštela, Klis, Lećevica, Marina, Muć, Okrug, Otok, Prgomet, Primorski Dolac, Seget, Sinj, Trilj, Trogir, Vrlika.

=== 2023 revision ===
Under the 2023 revision, district boundaries were redrawn according to the suggestion of the Constitutional Court to compel a proportional number of voters.

The new district consists of:

- The whole Šibenik-Knin County
- The northern part of Zadar County:
  - cities and municipalities: Benkovac, Biograd na Moru, Nin, Zadar, Bibinje, Galovac, Kali, Kukljica, Lišane Ostrovičke, Pakoštane, Pašman, Polača, Poličnik, Preko, Privlaka, Sali, Stankovci, Sukošan, Sveti Filip i Jakov, Škabrnja, Tkon, Vrsi and Zemunik Donji
- The northwestern part of Split-Dalmatia County:
  - cities and municipalities: Kaštela, Sinj, Solin, Trilj, Trogir, Vrlika, Dicmo, Dugopolje, Hrvace, Klis, Lećevica, Marina, Muć, Okrug, Otok, Prgomet, Primorski Dolac, Seget and Šolta

== Representatives ==
The current representatives of the ninth electoral district in the Croatian Parliament are:

| Name | Party | Deputizing |
|---|---|---|
| Ante Babić | HDZ | Šime Erlić |
| Nikolina Baradić | HDZ | Josip Bilaver |
| Ivan Bugarin | HDZ | |
| Branka Juričev-Martinčev | HDZ | |
| Ivan Malenica | HDZ | |
| Ante Sanader | HDZ | |
| Irena Dragić | SDP | |
| Sabina Glasovac | SDP | |
| Tonči Restović | SDP | |
| Miro Bulj | Most | |
| Ivica Ledenko | Most | Ivan Matić |
| Damir Biloglav | DOMiNO | |
| Hrvoje Zekanović | HDS | |
| Predrag Mišić | Independent | |

== Elections ==
=== 2000 Elections ===
| Party | Votes | % | Seats |
|---|---|---|---|
| SDP - HSLS | 87.004 | 32.70 | 6 |
| HDZ | 84.151 | 31.63 | 5 |
| HSS - LS - HNS - ASH | 29.668 | 11.15 | 2 |
| HSP - HKDU | 20.603 | 7.74 | 1 |
| others | 44.604 | 16.78 | 0 |
| Total | 266.030 | 100 | 14 |
| Valid votes | 266.030 | 97.97 | |
| Invalid/blank votes | 5.507 | 2.03 | |
| Total votes | 271.537 | 72.92 | |
| Registered voters/turnout | 372.363 | | |
Source: Results

SDP - HSLS

- Šime Lučin
- Joško Kontić
- Ingrid Antičević-Marinović
- Ivan Ninić
- Mario Kovač
- Romano Meštrović

HDZ

- Nikica Valentić
- Drago Krpina
- Ivo Baica
- Anton Kovačev
- Božidar Kalmeta

HSS - LS - HNS - ASH

- Ante Markov
- Vesna Pusić

HSP - HKDU

- Boris Kandare

=== 2003 Elections ===
| Party | Votes | % | Seats | +/- |
|---|---|---|---|---|
| HDZ | 121.078 | 48.56 | 9 | +4 |
| SDP | 38.039 | 15.26 | 2 | -4 |
| HNS | 15.081 | 6.05 | 1 | 0 |
| HSP | 14.372 | 5.76 | 1 | 0 |
| HSS | 12.888 | 5.17 | 1 | 0 |
| others | 47.874 | 19.20 | 0 | 0 |
| Total | 249.332 | 100 | 14 | 0 |
| Valid votes | 249.332 | 97.69 | | |
| Invalid/blank votes | 5.886 | 2.31 | | |
| Total votes | 255.218 | 65.70 | | |
| Registered voters/turnout | 388.450 | | | |
Source: Results Archived 2022-12-03 at the Wayback Machine

HDZ

- Božidar Kalmeta
- Darko Milinović
- Perica Bukić
- Jure Bitunjac
- Šime Prtenjača
- Jozo Topić
- Emil Tomljanović
- Ana Lovrin
- Niko Rebić

SDP

- Šime Lučin
- Ingrid Antičević-Marinović

HNS

- Ivica Maštruko

HSP

- Tonči Tadić

HSS

- Ante Markov

=== 2007 Elections ===
| Party | Votes | % | Seats | +/- |
|---|---|---|---|---|
| HDZ | 132.494 | 52.09 | 10 | +1 |
| SDP | 57.637 | 22.66 | 4 | +2 |
| others | 64.224 | 25.25 | 0 | -3 |
| Total | 254.355 | 100 | 14 | 0 |
| Valid votes | 254.355 | 98.22 | | |
| Invalid/blank votes | 4.606 | 1.78 | | |
| Total votes | 258.961 | 60.42 | | |
| Registered voters/turnout | 428.590 | | | |
Source: Results Archived 2022-12-03 at the Wayback Machine

HDZ

- Božidar Kalmeta
- Darko Milinović
- Ante Kulušić
- Ante Sanader
- Ivo Grbić
- Perica Bukić
- Emil Tomljanović
- Ana Lovrin
- Niko Rebić
- Nedjeljka Klarić

SDP

- Ranko Ostojić
- Ingrid Antičević-Marinović
- Ante Kotromanović
- Brankica Crljenko

=== 2011 Elections ===
| Party | Votes | % | Seats | +/- |
|---|---|---|---|---|
| HDZ - HGS | 90.645 | 36.87 | 8 | -2 |
| SDP - HNS - IDS - HSU | 71.220 | 28.97 | 6 | +2 |
| others | 84.003 | 34.16 | 0 | 0 |
| Total | 245.868 | 100 | 14 | 0 |
| Valid votes | 245.868 | 98.02 | | |
| Invalid/blank votes | 4.968 | 1.98 | | |
| Total votes | 250.836 | 56.93 | | |
| Registered voters/turnout | 440.597 | | | |
Source: Results Archived 2022-12-03 at the Wayback Machine

HDZ - HGS

- Božidar Kalmeta
- Darko Milinović
- Ante Kulušić
- Ante Sanader
- Branko Kutija
- Milan Jurković
- Nevenka Bečić
- Goran Pauk

SDP - HNS - IDS - HSU

- Ranko Ostojić
- Ingrid Antičević-Marinović
- Ante Kotromanović
- Franko Vidović
- Jozo Radoš
- Petar Baranović

=== 2015 Elections ===
| Party | Votes | % | Seats | +/- |
|---|---|---|---|---|
| HDZ - HSS - HSP AS - BUZ - HSLS - HRAST - HDS - ZDS | 116.195 | 49.54 | 8 | 0 |
| SDP - HNS - HSU - HL SR - A-HSS - ZS - SDSS | 60.944 | 25.99 | 4 | -2 |
| Most | 35.473 | 15.12 | 2 | +2 |
| others | 21.922 | 9.35 | 0 | 0 |
| Total | 234.534 | 100 | 14 | 0 |
| Valid votes | 234.534 | 98.17 | | |
| Invalid/blank votes | 4.371 | 1.83 | | |
| Total votes | 238.905 | 60.06 | | |
| Registered voters/turnout | 397.793 | | | |
Source: Results Archived 2022-12-03 at the Wayback Machine

HDZ - HSS - HSP AS - BUZ - HSLS - HRAST - HDS - ZDS

- Tomislav Karamarko
- Josipa Rimac
- Božidar Kalmeta
- Ante Sanader
- Darko Milinović
- Goran Pauk
- Josip Bilaver
- Ivan Šipić

SDP - HNS - HSU - HL SR - A-HSS - ZS - SDSS

- Ranko Ostojić
- Ivan Klarin
- Sabina Glasovac
- Ingrid Antičević-Marinović

Most

- Stipe Petrina
- Miro Bulj

=== 2016 Elections ===
| Party | Votes | % | Seats | +/- |
|---|---|---|---|---|
| HDZ | 102.768 | 49.61 | 8 | 0 |
| SDP - HNS - HSS - HSU | 49.843 | 24.06 | 4 | 0 |
| Most | 26.358 | 12.72 | 2 | 0 |
| others | 28.148 | 13.61 | 0 | 0 |
| Total | 207.117 | 100 | 14 | 0 |
| Valid votes | 207.117 | 97.90 | | |
| Invalid/blank votes | 4.434 | 2.10 | | |
| Total votes | 211.551 | 53.77 | | |
| Registered voters/turnout | 393.452 | | | |
Source: Results Archived 2022-12-03 at the Wayback Machine

HDZ

- Miro Kovač
- Branka Juričev-Martinčev
- Grozdana Perić
- Ante Sanader
- Darko Milinović
- Nediljko Dujić
- Hrvoje Zekanović
- Davor Lončar

SDP - HNS - HSS - HSU

- Ranko Ostojić
- Sabina Glasovac
- Ivan Klarin
- Franko Vidović

Most

- Miro Bulj
- Marko Vučetić

=== 2020 Elections ===
| Party | Votes | % | Seats | +/- |
|---|---|---|---|---|
| HDZ | 85.075 | 47.46 | 8 | 0 |
| SDP - HSS - HSU - SNAGA - GLAS - IDS - PGS | 30.823 | 17.19 | 3 | -1 |
| DP - HS - BLOK - HKS - HRAST - SU - ZL | 21.353 | 11.91 | 2 | +2 |
| Most | 18.028 | 10.05 | 1 | -1 |
| others | 23.963 | 13.39 | 0 | 0 |
| Total | 179.242 | 100 | 14 | 0 |
| Valid votes | 179.242 | 97.51 | | |
| Invalid/blank votes | 4.572 | 2.49 | | |
| Total votes | 183.814 | 44.85 | | |
| Registered voters/turnout | 409.883 | | | |
Source: Results Archived 2022-12-03 at the Wayback Machine

HDZ

- Božidar Kalmeta
- Ivan Malenica
- Grozdana Perić
- Ante Sanader
- Marijan Kustić
- Rade Šimičević
- Nediljko Dujić
- Luka Brčić

SDP - HSS - HSU - SNAGA - GLAS - IDS - PGS

- Franko Vidović
- Renata Sabljar-Dračevac
- Matko Kuzmanić

DP - HS - BLOK - HKS - HRAST - SU - ZL

- Karolina Vidović Krišto
- Hrvoje Zekanović

Most

- Miro Bulj
