= Željko Burić =

Croatian physician and politician (born 1955)

Mayor of Šibenik
- Incumbent
- Assumed office 10 June 2013
- Deputy: Danijel Mileta (2013–); Nikica Penđer (2013–2017); Paško Rakić (2017–2021)
- Preceded by: Ante Županović

Personal details
- Born: 15 July 1955 (age 71) Šibenik, PR Croatia, FPR Yugoslavia
- Party: Croatian Democratic Union (2010–present)
- Other political affiliations: League of Communists of Croatia (1973–1990); Croatian Social Liberal Party (1992–2010)
- Spouse: Vesna Burić
- Children: 3
- Education: University of Zagreb
- Occupation: Physician, politician
- Profession: Ophthalmology
- Website: zeljkoburic.net

Željko Burić (pronounced [ʒêːʎko bûːritɕ]; born 15 July 1955) is a Croatian physician and politician who has served as the mayor of Šibenik since 2013. Before becoming mayor, he served as director of the General Hospital of Šibenik-Knin County in Šibenik.

== Early life and education ==
Born in Šibenik, Burić spent his childhood and completed his elementary education in his hometown. After finishing elementary school, he decided to further his education in a gymnasium. He was enrolled at the Faculty of Medicine of the University of Zagreb in 1974 and graduated in 1979.

As a young physician, Burić followed the standard path of internship and passed his professional exam in June 1982. His first jobs were in field outpatient clinics in smaller towns such as Perković and Boraja until 1982. Afterwards he worked in emergency services until 1985. He then decided to return to school to specialize in ophthalmology, which had always interested him. His postgraduate study in this area ended in 1988. In 2003 he enrolled in a Postgraduate Clinical Health Management Study, which he completed in 2004. In the 1990s Burić joined the Croatian War of Independence and was awarded the Homeland War Memorial Medal.

== Medical career ==
From January 1999 until he was elected mayor of Šibenik in June 2013, Burić served as the director of the General Hospital of the Šibenik-Knin County based in Šibenik. He had participated in national and international congresses, and medical consultations and seminars.

== Political career ==
In 1973 Burić joined the League of Communists of Croatia (SKH), but following the breakup of Yugoslavia he left the party and joined the Croatian Social Liberal Party (HSLS) in 1992. Burić had also served as Šibenik city councillor and in one term as Šibenik-Knin County assemblyman. In 2010 he joined the Croatian Democratic Union (HDZ). He is currently the president of the party's branch in Šibenik.

In January 2020 Burić, along with prefect of Šibenik-Knin County Goran Pauk, openly supported Andrej Plenković's candidacy for the second consecutive term as the HDZ president.

=== Mayor of Šibenik ===
In the mayoral elections in May/June 2013, Burić was nominated by the coalition of the HDZ, HSP, HSS and HČSP as a candidate for the position of mayor of Šibenik. He won the seat in the second round of voting on 2 June, winning 49.84 per cent of the votes.

Burić was re-elected as mayor in the mayoral elections in June 2017, winning 69.78 per cent of the votes in the run-off.

In the 2021 mayoral elections, Burić was elected mayor for the third consecutive time, winning 10,844 votes or 64 per cent of the votes in the run-off.

== Personal life ==
Burić is married with son and two daughters. He lives in a family home in his hometown of Šibenik, and enjoys reading good literature, hiking in the nature and swimming in the summer months.

He prefers to listen to Croatian singer-songwriter, Zlatan Stipišić Gibonni.

Political offices
Preceded by Ante Županović	Mayor of Šibenik; 10 June 2013–present	Incumbent
