= Danijel Mileta =

Croatian politician

Deputy Mayor of Šibenik
- Incumbent
- Assumed office 10 June 2013
- Preceded by: Franko Vidović

Personal details
- Born: 12 January 1975 (age 51) Šibenik, SR Croatia, SFR Yugoslavia
- Party: HDZ
- Spouse: Marijana Mileta
- Children: 4
- Education: University of Zagreb

Danijel Mileta (born 12 January 1975) is a Croatian politician and electrical engineer who has been deputy mayor of Šibenik since 2013.

== Early life ==
Mileta was born in Šibenik where he completed elementary school and naturalistic-mathematical gymnasium. He graduated from the Zagreb Faculty of Electrical Engineering and Computing where he completed his postgraduate scientific studies and gained the professional title of Master of Science. In 2002 Mileta enrolled in postgraduate scientific studies of business economics from organization and management at the Zagreb Faculty of Economics, where he passed all the exams in a regular manner.

== Business career ==
His rich business experience began in 2000 at Hrvatski Telekom as a telecommunications and mobile network specialist and then as an associate for a network strategy and business plan. Since 2003 he has worked in Končar as the manager of the organizational unit that produces the first Croatian laptops, and from 2005 to 2009 he had worked as the director of the Gradski parking d.o.o. (English: City Parking Ltd.) in Šibenik where he became the double winner of the Employer's HR Excellence Partner (2008, 2009) and the awards like Winner of the Year, award in the category of public enterprises awarded by CROMA (Croatian Association of Managers and Entrepreneurs) (2008), and the Business Journal Lider magazine listed him among the top 250 young managers (2009).

As the state secretary in the Ministry of the Sea, Transport and Infrastructure, he was in charge of the period from 2010 to 2011, where he was also a member of the Council for Information Technology of the State Administration and member of the Board of the Republic of Croatia for Stabilization and Association. Since 2012 he has been the senior consultant for the area of energy efficiency and renewable energy sources of the Development Agency of the Šibenik-Knin County.

In the period between 2006 and 2012, Mileta was a member of the board of the high technical school in his hometown, as well as a member of the board of today dissolved water polo club VK Šibenik, member of the supervisory board of Gradska čistoća d.o.o., president of the general assembly of Croatia Airlines and the vice-president of the Croatian Parking Association.

== Political career ==
In the 2013 local elections, following Željko Burić's victory as a candidate for mayor of Šibenik, Mileta sworn in as his deputy alongside Nikica Penđer, a Croatian Conservative Party politician. In the 2017 local elections, Burić was re-elected as mayor, and Mileta continued to hold the position, this time alongside Paško Rakić.

In the 2021 local elections, Burić was elected mayor for the third consecutive time, with Mileta as his deputy again.

== Personal life ==
Mileta is married to his wife Marijana, a former Yugoslav karate champion, with whom he has four children: Lucija, Toma, and twins Mare and Antea. He had enjoyed to play basketball in his youth.
