= Bobodol =

- Location within Croatia
- Coordinates: 43°59′N 16°06′E
- Country: Croatia
- County: Šibenik-Knin
- Municipality: Promina

Area
  - Total: 10.3 km^{2} (4.0 sq mi)

Population (2021)
  - Total: 21
  - Density: 2.0/km^{2} (5.3/sq mi)
- Time zone: UTC+1 (CET)
  - Summer (DST): UTC+2 (CEST)

Bobodol is a settlement (naselje) in Croatia, situated 12 km (7.5 mi) south of Knin and 3 km (1.9 mi) north of Oklaj in the Dalmatia region. It is administratively located in the Municipality of Promina in the Šibenik-Knin County. The name Bobodol means the valley of Bob, which is a small shrub fruit. The village can date its existence back more than 300 years. In 1995 it had 160 residents with the youngest average population in the entire Drniš council. Most of the people were farmers growing wheat, grapes, corn and other small vegetables as well as keeping sheep and cattle.

In 1995 Bobodol was destroyed. The Croatian War of Independence which raged since 1991 reached its climax when the Croatian Forces attacked in a large scale operation known as Oluja (storm).

Currently only 20 people reside in Bobodol. Coming back after years in exile, they are looking to rebuild.
