= Miro Bulj =

Croatian politician (born 1972)

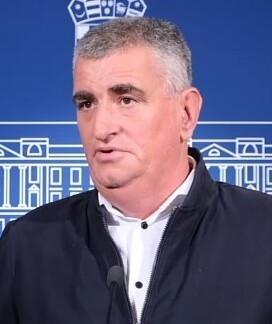
- Bulj speaking in the Croatian Parliament

Mayor of Sinj
- Incumbent
- Assumed office 16 May 2021

Member of the Croatian Parliament
- Incumbent
- Assumed office 28 December 2015
- Constituency: Electoral district IX

Personal details
- Born: 11 March 1972 (age 54) Suhač, Croatia
- Party: The Bridge

Miro Bulj (pronounced [ˌmíːro ˈbûːʎ]; born 11 March 1972) is a Croatian politician of The Bridge. He has been a member of the Croatian Parliament since 2015, and was elected mayor of Sinj in the 2021 local elections. In October 2024, he announced his candidacy for Presidency of Croatia in the 2024 presidential election.

== Early life ==
Bulj was born on March 11, 1972 in the village of Suhač near Sinj. His father Neno was a worker at the Dalmatinka sewing factory, while his mother Zorka took care of the household and the family farm. He is the second of three children in the family

During the Homeland War, Bulj defended Croatia from Serbian-Yugoslav aggression. He fought on several battlefields during the war, from Vrlika on August 25, 1991, until the country's final liberation in 1995.

In the spring of 1991, as a 19 year old he joined the reserve forces of the Ministry of the Interior. In October, he transferred from the Ministry of the Interior to the newly established 126th Brigade of the Croatian Army. He became an officer and was given the rank of ensign. In early 1994, he froze his rank because it was a condition for his transfer to the 4th Guards Brigade, where he attained the rank of officer, and retired with the rank of lieutenant in 2007.

== Education ==
Bulj attended a Vocational Secondary School for workers in textile industry.

== Political Life ==
Bulj has been in the Sabor since December 2015, and has been in the seat of the mayor of Sinj Since the local elections in 2021.

In October 2024, he announced his candidacy for Presidency of Croatia. Bulj managed to get 3,82 percent of the national vote, which equated to 62,167 votes total.

== Political Views ==
During the Covid-19 Pandemic Bulj opposed government‑mandated COVID certificates, stating that they discriminated between vaccinated and unvaccinated residents. As Mayor of Sinj, he announced that entry to municipal buildings would not require such certificates, emphasizing personal choice and questioning their effectiveness. This stance drew public attention and debate over compliance with national health measures. He later bragged that he was "the only mayor in Croatia who did not introduce the COVID certificates". According to Croatian news site Dnevnik.hr, City of Sinj was subsequently fined 30,000 Croatian kuna, and Bulj announced that he would personally pay the fine.

Bulj believes that the migration of foreign Nepali workers into Croatia is a way for the government to get cheaper labour rather than to incentivize locals to increase Croatia's fertility rate. During his candidacy on 2024 / 2025 Presidential elections in Croatia, Bulj announced that he will fight against illegal immigration and population replacement. In October 2024, he announced the formation of "civic guards" which would be ready to fire on illegally trespassing migrants.
