= Nedjeljka Klarić =

Croatian lawyer and politician

Neda Klarić

Mayor of Šibenik
- In office 12 May 2004 – 14 June 2009
- Deputy: Goran Pauk (2004–2005); Tomislav Ninić (2004–2009); Tomislav Jukić (2005–2009)
- Preceded by: Milan Arnautović; Mirko Goreta (Government Commissioner)
- Succeeded by: Ante Županović

Member of the Croatian Parliament
- In office 11 January 2008 – 22 December 2011
- Preceded by: Perica Bukić
- Constituency: IX electoral district

Personal details
- Born: Nedjeljka Mikulandra; 17 October 1954 (age 72) Bilice, PR Croatia, FPR Yugoslavia (modern Croatia)
- Party: Croatian Democratic Union
- Education: University of Zagreb
- Occupation: Politician, lawyer

Nedjeljka "Neda" Klarić (pronounced [nedʑeʎka neda klǎːritɕ]; née Mikulandra [mikǔlandra]; born 17 October 1954) is a Croatian former politician, lawyer and qualified social worker who served as Mayor of Šibenik from 2004 to 2009, and as a member of the Croatian Parliament from 2008 to 2011.

== Biography ==
Neda Klarić was born on 17 October 1954 in the village of Bilice, then administratively part of nearby Šibenik, and today an independent municipality. She graduated from the Faculty of Law at the University of Zagreb.

She is married and has a daughter, Franka (b. 1987), who is an actress.

== Political career ==
As a member of the conservative centre-right Croatian Democratic Union (HDZ), Klarić became the party's candidate for Mayor of Šibenik following the early elections for the City Council held on 18 April 2004. After the HDZ won a majority of seats on the City Council, she was elected mayor on 12 May 2004.

In the 2009 local election Klarić lost in the second round to Ante Županović, the candidate of an SDP-led coalition, who succeeded her as mayor. She subsequently withdrew from active politics.

Klarić also was a member of the 6th assembly of the Croatian Parliament between January 2008 to December 2011, representing the 9th electoral district.

Political offices
Preceded by Milan Arnautović	Mayor of Šibenik; 16 May 2004 – 18 June 2009	Succeeded by Ante Županović
