= Barone Fortress =

Coordinates: 43.7373°N 15.8964°E

- Tvrđava Barone; Tvrđava Šubićevac (Croatian)
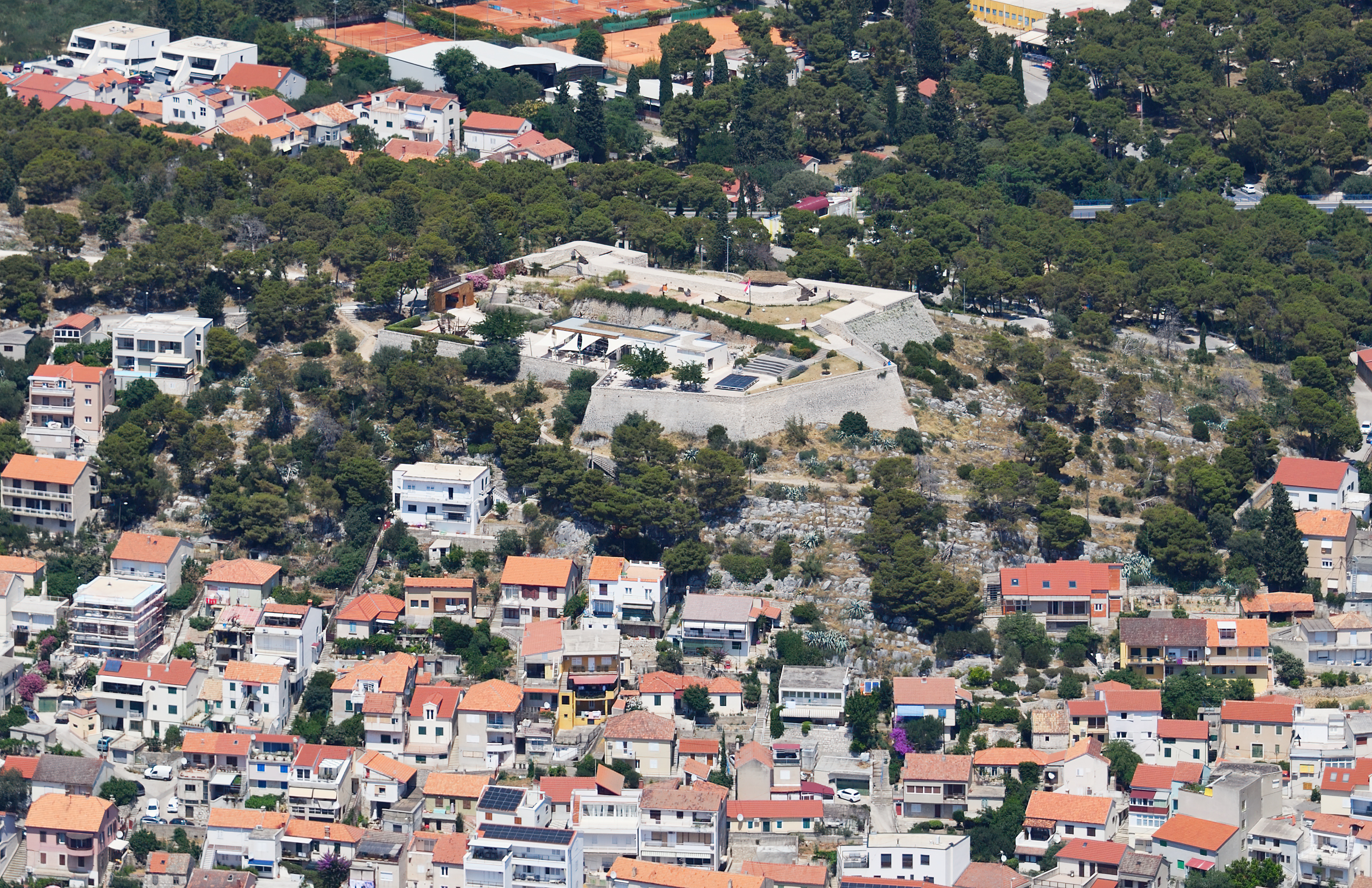
- Aerial view
- Interactive map of Barone Fortress
- Type: Fortress
- Location: Put Vuka Mandušića, Šibenik, Croatia

History
- Built: 1646

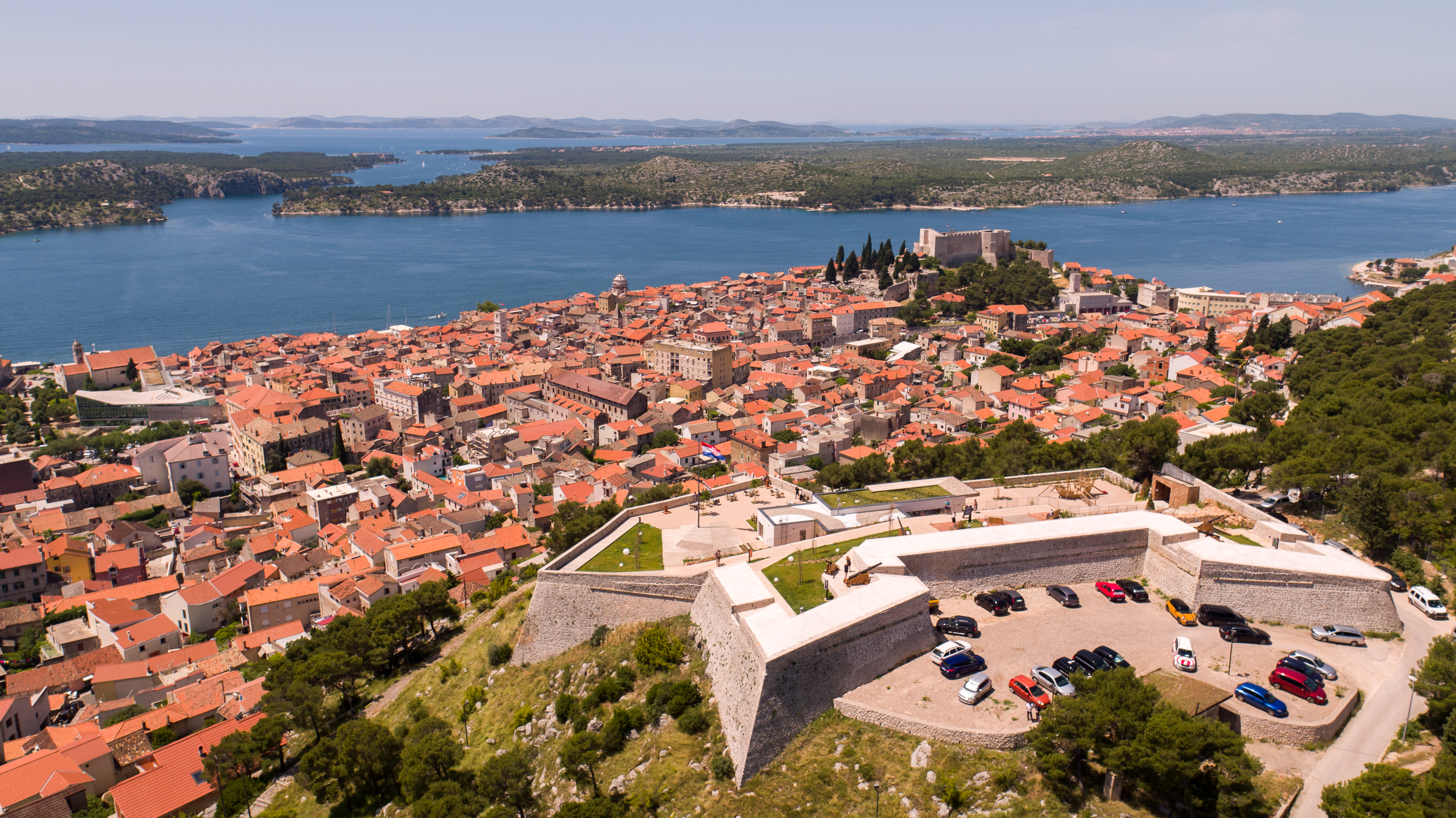
Barone Fortress (lower right) in 2016

The Barone Fortress (also known as Šubićevac Fortress; Croatian: Tvrđava Barone or Tvrđava Šubićevac) in Šibenik, Croatia, is an early modern fortress constructed in 1646 on Vidakuša hill above the city. Together with the remaining three city fortresses, it is a part of the Šibenik fortification system. It played a significant role in city's defense from the Ottomans during the Cretan War. For a long time, it carried the name of its main defender, Baron Christoph Martin von Degenfeld. At the start of the 20th century, along with the surrounding neighborhood, it was renamed Šubićevac, after the medieval patrician family Šubić.

== War of Crete and construction of the fortress ==
Since at least the mid-16th century, the city rectors and envoys had been stressing the need for the construction of fortification objects on the hills north of the city, because the city walls and St. Michael's Fortress had not been built to endure any prolonged artillery attack. The pleas were constantly rejected by the Venetian senate due to lack of funds. In the spring of 1646, one year after the Cretan War broke out between the Venetians and the Ottomans, the Bosnian pasha began to amass a large army for the attack on Dalmatia. At the same time, a German nobleman in Venetian service, Baron Christoph Martin von Degenfeld, took over the defense of the city, and a Genoese military engineer, Father Antonio Leni, arrived in Šibenik and made sketches for the necessary improvement of the city's defense. When the people of Šibenik renewed their request for protection, the Venetians denied them the funds once again, but the citizens were not explicitly forbidden from building the fortification by themselves. Upon hearing that, they took the matter into their own hands – the construction of both Barone Fortress and the adjacent St. John's Fortress began on 1 August 1646, and both fortresses were successfully built in only 58 days. The first Ottoman siege in October 1646 was fended off after just seven days. The fortresses were strengthened over the following winter and prepared for the next attack. On 17 August 1647, the Ottoman commander, Techieli-pasha, arrived in Šibenik with the largest invading army in Dalmatia since the Roman era – 25,000 soldiers and heavy artillery. After a ferocious one-month siege, the enemy withdrew with great losses in both manpower and equipment. Turkish invaders were forced to retreat to the interior, towards Drniš, and never managed to conquer Šibenik.

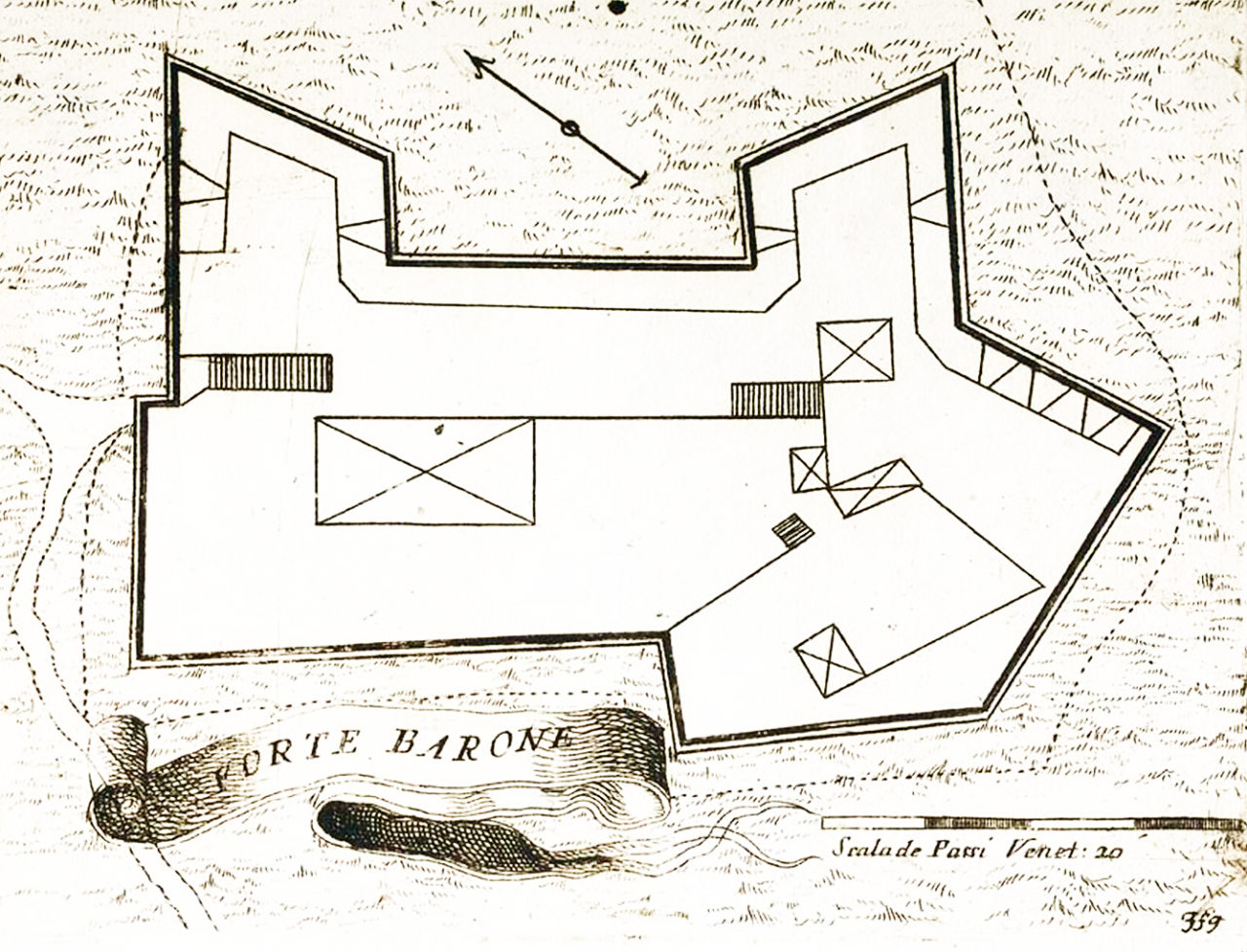

== Architecture ==
Originally, Barone Fortress looked somewhat different from what does today, as it was probably hurriedly built in the dry-stone technique. Thirteen years later, in 1659, the Venetian provveditore Antonio Bernardo initialized the construction work that transformed the fortress into an object measuring up to the standards of contemporary military architecture. Shaped as an irregular star, the fortress resisted enemy cannons thanks to the bastions reinforced with mounds. The northern part of the fortress (hornwork) has two demi-bastions connected by a curtain wall. That was the position of the defense artillery. The southern part was used for barracks and magazines. After the Ottoman threat had passed, the fortress was maintained poorly, and the original objects have decayed or been torn down with time. In the early 20th century, the City of Šibenik purchased and then renamed the fortress and its surrounding area.

== Revitalization project ==
Barone Fortress was revitalized through an EU-funded project worth €1.38 million, and re-opened in January 2016. Like the renovated St. Michael's Fortress in 2014, Barone Fortress also won the national Cultural Attraction of the Year Award in 2016. It now offers its visitors a digital tour through Šibenik's past, via an augmented reality platform and other multimedia features.

== Gallery ==
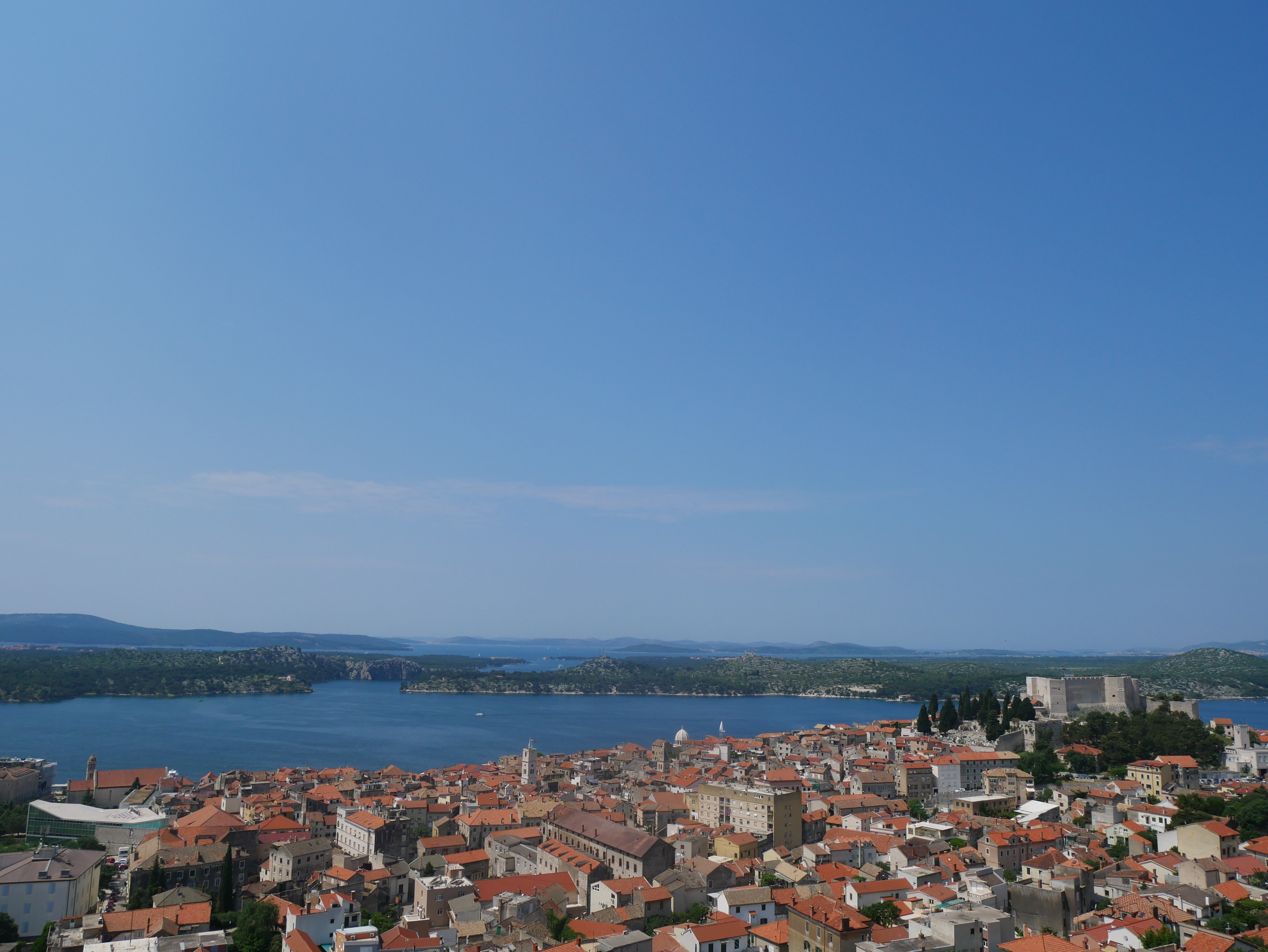
View of Šibenik from Barone fortress

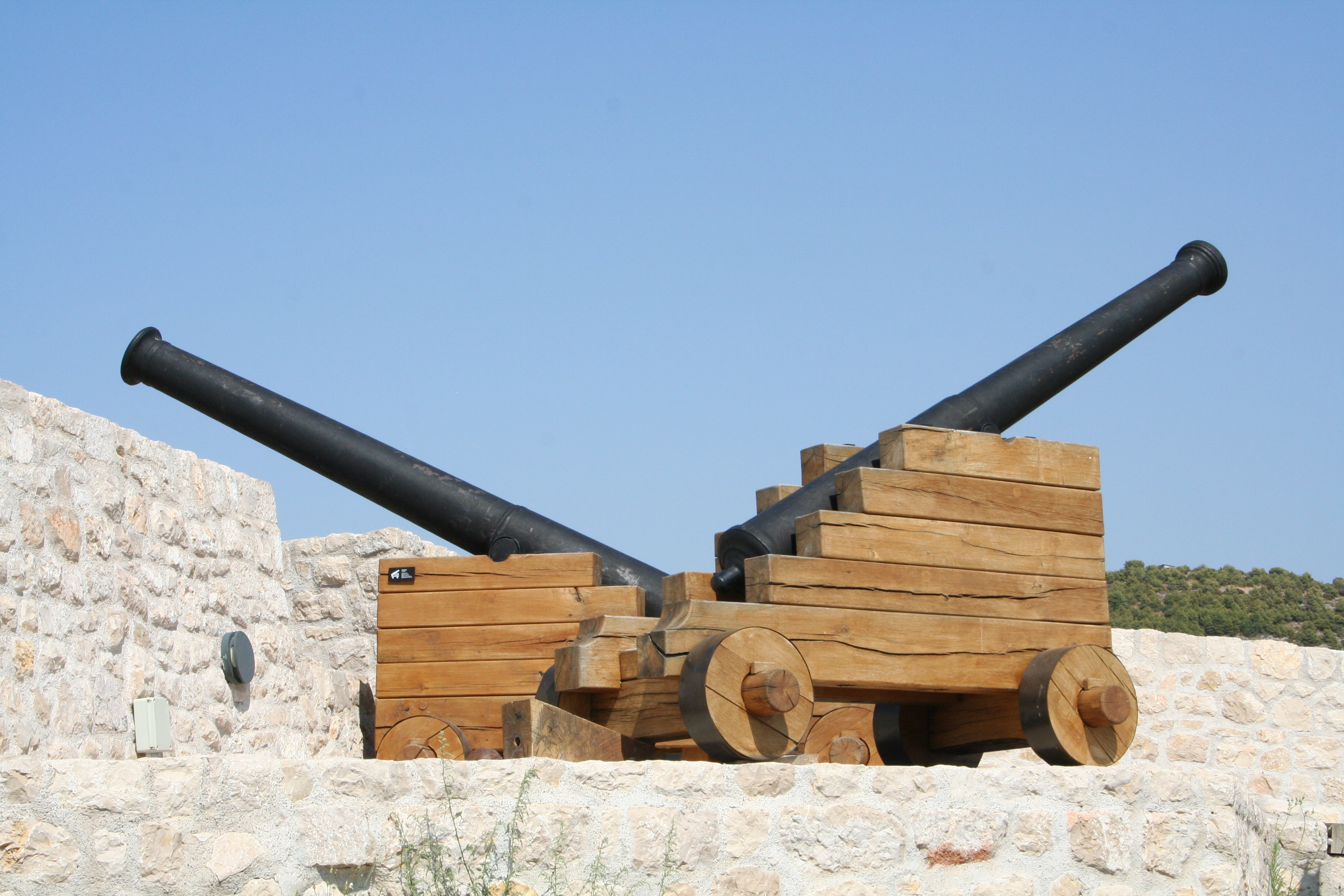
Barone Fortress in Šibenik, cannons

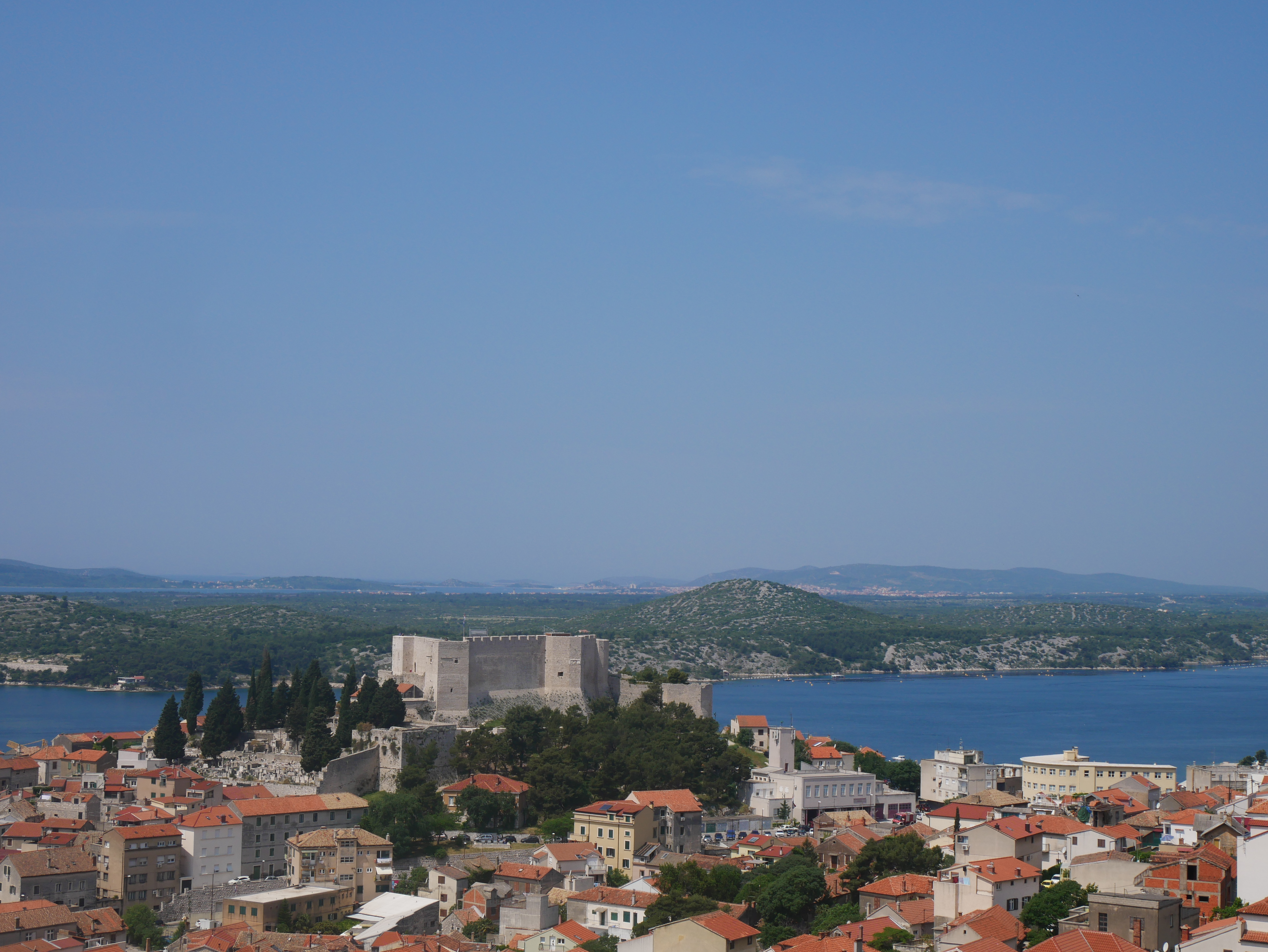
View of St. Michael's Fortress from Barone

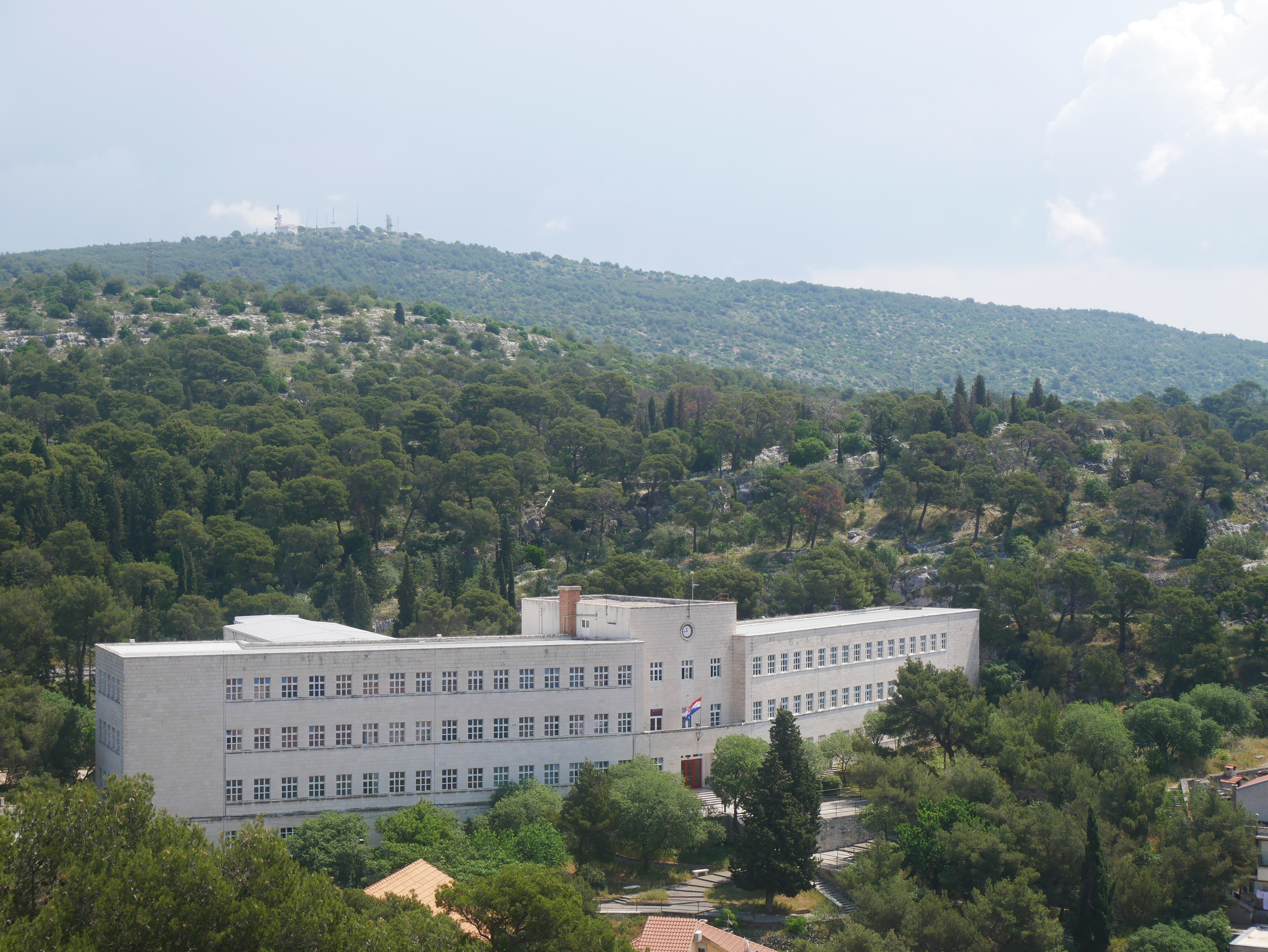
View of Antun Vrančić High School from Barone
