= Ivan Aralica =

Croatian novelist and essayist (born 1930)

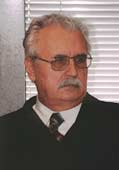
- Born: 10 September 1930 (age 95) (Note: Due to a misprint in a major newspaper, Aralica's birth date is often inaccurately reported as September 30.); Promina, Kingdom of Yugoslavia
- Occupations: Novelist, essayist, politician
- Writing career
- Period: 1967–present

Ivan Aralica (born 10 September 1930) is a Croatian novelist and essayist.

== Biography ==
Born in Promina near Knin, and having finished pedagogical school and Philosophical Faculty at the University of Zadar, Aralica had worked since 1953 as a high school teacher in the backwater villages of the rural hinterland of northern and central Dalmatia. After a period of communist infatuation (which resulted in a few weak novellas that can be labeled as socialist realism period pieces), Aralica was swept into the vortex of turbulent events known as the Croatian Spring (1971). During this tumultuous era he allied with those who advocated greater Croatian autonomy and freedom for Croatian people in the Socialist Federal Republic of Yugoslavia. The crackdown on the Croatian national movement and subsequent professional and social degradation resulted in Aralica's return to his Catholic-Christian roots, abandonment of doctrinaire propagandist literature and formation of his own literary credo. Among world authors, he was influenced chiefly by realist fiction and early modernism, the key authors being Ivo Andrić, Thomas Mann and Knut Hamsun.

From 1979 to 1989 Aralica published eight novels, which can be best described as modernist rewritings of historical fiction. The best among them (Psi u trgovištu/Dogs at a bazaar, 1979; Duše robova/Slaves' souls, 1984; Graditelj svratišta/Builder of an inn, 1986; Asmodejev šal/Asmodey's shawl, 1988) show similar traits: these are essentially novels of complex narrative techniques recreating dramatic events in Croatia and Bosnia and Herzegovina from 16th to 18th century and describing historical fatum of Croats caught in the "Clash of Civilizations"- a three centuries long warfare between the Austrian Empire, the Ottoman Empire and Venice. Aralica successfully mastered many divergent elements in his fiction, so that his finest novels are both replete with contemplative wisdom sayings on human condition and rammed with action; also, his artistry is expressed in numerous naturalist passages integrated in the overarching Christian vision of life where natural and the supernatural fuse into one reality.

After the reintroduction of a multi-party system in 1990 and subsequent breakup of Yugoslavia, Aralica was elected to the Croatian Academy of Sciences and Arts; also, he re-entered politics, this time on the list of Croatian Democratic Union (HDZ), then headed by the first president of Croatia since its independence Franjo Tuđman. Aralica held a few influential positions, the most important among them being vice-president of Croatian Parliament. During this period he wrote two books of political essays (one about the genesis of Serbian imperialism, the other on historical complexities of the Bosnian War), and two other novels.

The year 2000 was another turning point for Aralica: his party, HDZ, lost the elections and power, and writer was embroiled in a bitter polemic with new authorities (which were to hold power for the next four years). Aralica began writing satirical romans à clef (thinly disguised quasi-fiction). The most famous one is Fukara ("Good for nothing") from 2002, a satirical-political attack on "multi-culturalist ideology" as promulgated by controversial American billionaire George Soros. The literary value of his works published during this period was often disputed, and they were seen by many left-wing literary critics (Perišić, Jergović, Tagirov, Alajbegović) as little more than tasteless political pamphlets. However, Aralica has also become one of the cultural and intellectual icons of nationalist conservatism in Croatia, advocating the return to the tradition symbolized by "ognjište" ("hearth"). Intellectuals on the political right defended his novels claiming that they were brilliant political satires.

== Works ==
- Konjanik (1971)
- Opsjene paklenih crteža (1977)
- Psi u trgovištu (1979)
- Put bez sna (1982)
- Duše robova (1984)
- Graditelj svratišta (1986)
- Asmodejev šal (1988)
- Zadah ocvalog imperija (1991)
- Sokak triju ruža (1992)
- Majka Marija (1992)
- Spletanje i raspletanje čvorova (1993)
- Što sam rekao o Bosni (1995)
- I tu je kraj (1999)
- Ambra (2000)
- Fukara (2002)
- Puž (2004)
- Duh zloduha (2020)
