= Promina, Croatia =

Promina
- Municipality
- Općina Promina; Municipality of Promina
- Interactive map of Promina
- Location within Croatia
- Coordinates: 43°57′02.16″N 16°04′55.92″E
- Country: Croatia
- Region: Dalmatia (Dalmatian Hinterland)
- County: Šibenik-Knin County

Government
  - Mayor: Tihomir Budanko (HDZ)

Area
  - Total: 139.3 km^{2} (53.8 sq mi)

Population (2021)
  - Total: 943
- Time zone: UTC+1 (CET)
- Postal code: 22320 Drniš

Promina is a municipality in Šibenik-Knin County, Croatia. The village of Oklaj serves as the administration centre of the municipality.

== Population ==
In 2021, the municipality had 943 residents in the following 11 settlements:

- Bobodol, population 21
- Bogatić, population 22
- Čitluk, population 104
- Lukar, population 59
- Ljubotić, population 18
- Matase, population 38
- Mratovo, population 47
- Oklaj, population 410
- Puljane, population 38
- Razvođe, population 137
- Suknovci, population 49
Promina: Population trends 1857–2021
v

population	4240	4312	4279	5059	5462	5620	6005	5971	6367	6525	6296	5052	3404	2574	1317	1136	943
	1857	1869	1880	1890	1900	1910	1921	1931	1948	1953	1961	1971	1981	1991	2001	2011	2021

Sources: Croatian Bureau of Statistics publications

In 2011, there was a total of 1136 inhabitants, with 94.81% of them being Croats.

In the 1991 census, 2,574 residents lived in Promina district, of which 85 per cent Croats and 14 per cent Serbs.

== Notable people ==
- Branislav Pokrajac, (handball)
- Damir Pokrajac, (basketball)
- Ivan Aralica, novelist and writer
- Marino Jakovljević (football)
- Ante Jakovljević (football)
- Martin Klepo (tennis)
- Danijel Bandalo (basketball)
- Luka Duvančić (football)
- Slavko Kulić, economist
- Josipa Rimac, politician
- Tomislav Gabrić (basketball)
