= Marko Jelić =

Croatian politician and university professor

PhD, BSc Marko Jelić

Prefect of Šibenik-Knin County
- In office 4 June 2021 – 11 June 2025
- Deputy: Iris Ukić Kotarac; Ognjen Vukmirović (Serb national minority)
- Preceded by: Goran Pauk
- Succeeded by: Paško Rakić

Mayor of Knin
- In office 4 June 2017 – 4 June 2021
- Preceded by: Josipa Rimac; Nikola Blažević (Acting)
- Succeeded by: Marijo Ćaćić

Personal details
- Born: 15 March 1976 (age 50) Knin, SR Croatia, SFR Yugoslavia
- Party: Independent
- Spouse: Nadana Jelić
- Children: 4
- Education: University of Zagreb; University of Kiel; LMU Munich
- Occupation: Politician, university professor
- Website: Official website

Marko Jelić (pronounced [maːrko jɛlitɕ]; born 15 March 1976) is a Croatian politician and university professor who served as prefect of Šibenik-Knin County from 2021 to 2025. To date, he is the only holder of the office to be an independent.

He previously also served as mayor of Knin from 2017 to 2021.

== Early life and education ==
Born in Knin in 1976, Jelić finished elementary school and the first two grades of high school in his native town, while in 1994 he completed the final two grades at the Juraj Baraković High School in Zadar. In 2000, he graduated in Molecular Biology at the Faculty of Science of the University of Zagreb, earning the title of Bachelor of Science.

In 2003, he received his PhD in Molecular Biology and Biochemistry from the University of Kiel and LMU Munich.

== Career ==
Jelić started his career in 2004 as a senior associate for new technologies at the Center for Entrepreneurship of the City of Knin.

In 2005, he was appointed interim and in October 2007 permanent dean of the Marko Marulić Polytechnic in Knin. He held that position for four years, in parallel with the president of the Council of Polytechnics and Higher Education Institutions of the Republic of Croatia.

In 2012, he was appointed director for Management and Development of Matica d.o.o. in Knin and the year before he became the head of the Innovation Center and vice dean for development, scientific and professional cooperation at the Marko Marulić Polytechnic in Knin.

From 2015 to 2016, he was the acting dean of the ASPIRA College of Management and Design in Split, and since 2005 he has been a full teacher of Biology, Biochemistry, Plant Physiology, Environmental Protection and Hunting at the Marko Marulić Polytechnic in Knin.

== Political career ==
In the 2017 local elections as a member of his own independent list (Dr. Marko Jelić's Independent List), Jelić defeated his opponent and former HDZ mayor of Knin, Josipa Rimac, in the runoff.

On 20 March 2021, Jelić confirmed his candidacy for prefect of Šibenik-Knin County in the 2021 local elections which will be held on 16 May. His candidacy was supported by all independent mayors in the county, as well as by Independent List Stipe Petrina, whose member, Iris Ukić Kotarac, was selected as the candidate for deputy prefect. On 16 May, Jelić won the first round of elections, winning 36.52% and thus securing a place in the runoff against the incumbent prefect, Goran Pauk of the HDZ.

As well Jelić won by a slim margin of 187 votes over incumbent prefect and advanced to the runoff, the candidate list of the group of voters gathered around Jelić won six seats in the county assembly. In the second round held two weeks later, he was elected Prefect of Šibenik-Knin County, winning 25,458 votes against Pauk's 16,366, making him the first non-partisan prefect of the county and the first prefect of the county not elected from the Croatian Democratic Union (HDZ).

He officially took over the duties of prefect on 4 June 2021.

Political offices
| Preceded by Josipa Rimac | Mayor of Knin; 2017–2021 | Succeeded by Marijo Ćaćić |
| Preceded by Goran Pauk | Prefect of Šibenik-Knin County; 2021–present | Incumbent |
