= Karolina Vidović Krišto =

Croatian politician (born 1975)

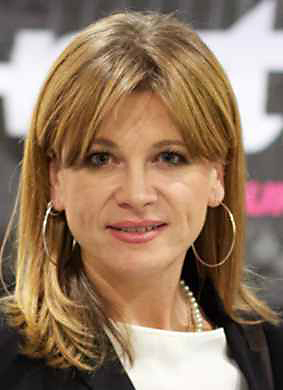
- Vidović Krišto in 2013

Member of the Croatian Parliament
- In office 22 July 2020 – 14 March 2024
- Constituency: District IX

Personal details
- Born: 29 December 1975 (age 50)
- Party: Determination and Justice

Karolina Vidović Krišto (born 29 December 1975) is a Croatian journalist and politician. She is the leader of Determination and Justice, which she founded in 2022. From 2020 to 2024, she was a member of the Croatian Parliament, elected on the list of Miroslav Škoro Homeland Movement, but since late 2020 an independent representative. In November 2024, she announced her candidacy for president of Croatia in the 2024 presidential election.

She gained further attention for a defamation lawsuit she filed against Zagreb Pride after being nominated for their satirical "Homophobe of the Year" award in 2013 after comparing homosexuality to pedophilia on her show on HRT. Lower courts ruled in her favor, awarding her approximately €5,240 in damages in 2015. However, in 2024, the Constitutional Court overturned these decisions, ruling against Vidović Krišto and affirming that the nomination was protected as freedom of speech. That same year, she announced her candidacy for president in the 2024 presidential election, but failed to collect enough signatures to ensure nomination.
