= Ante Županović =

Croatian politician (born 1949)

Mayor of Šibenik
- In office 18 June 2009 – 10 June 2013
- Deputy: Petar Baranović; Franko Vidović
- Preceded by: Nedjeljka Klarić
- Succeeded by: Željko Burić

Personal details
- Born: 27 September 1949 (age 77) Šibenik, PR Croatia, FPR Yugoslavia
- Party: Independent
- Spouse: Meri Županović
- Children: 2

Ante Županović (born 27 September 1949) is a Croatian physician and former politician who served as Mayor of Šibenik from 2009 to 2013.

Political offices
Preceded by Nedjeljka Klarić	Mayor of Šibenik; 18 June 2009 – 10 June 2013	Succeeded by Željko Burić
