= Keva's pit cave =

Geological feature in Croatia

Coordinates: 43°36′22″N 16°19′39″E

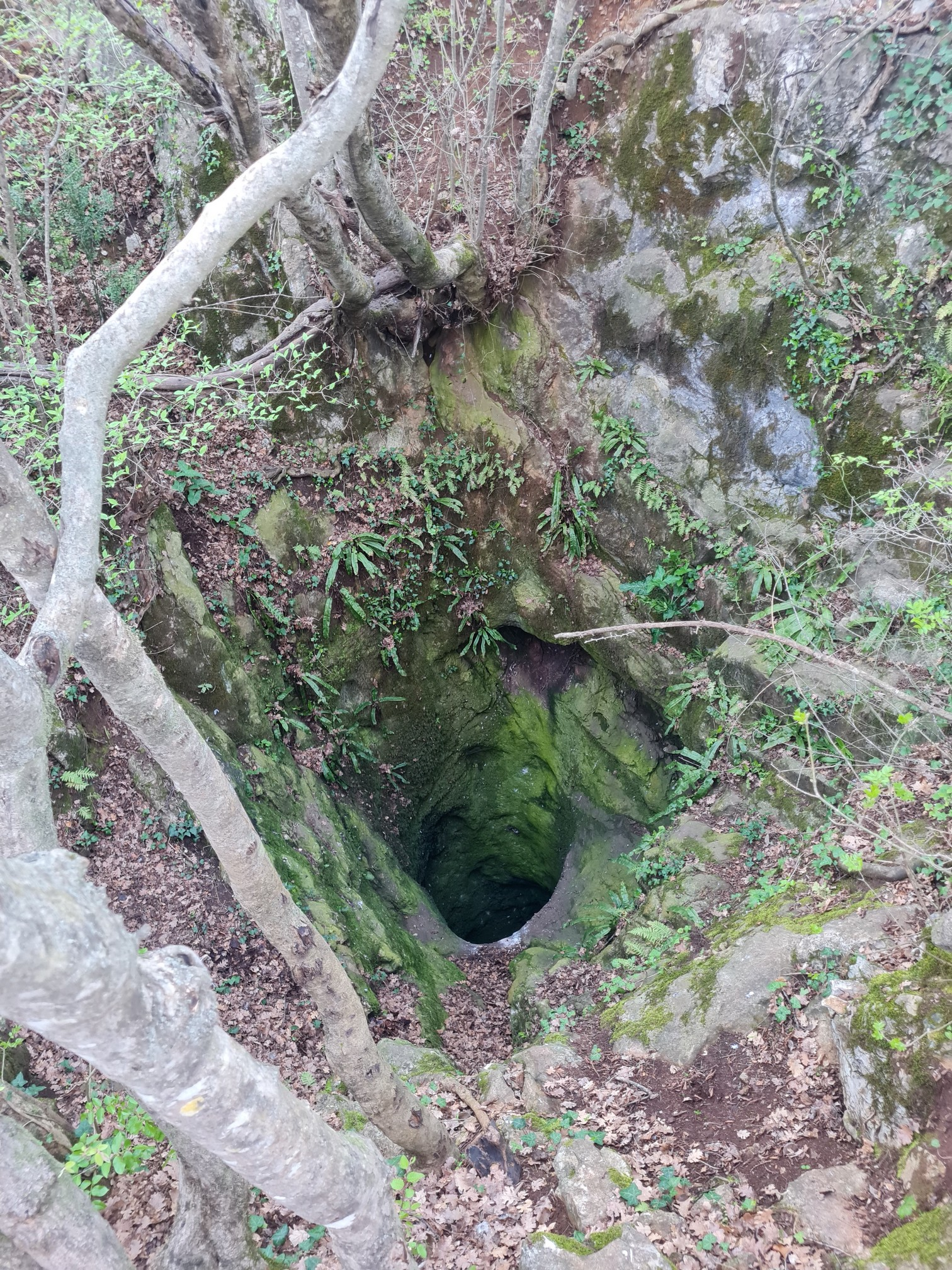

Keva's pit cave (Croatian: Kevina jama) is a pit cave located in the village of Radošić in the municipality of Lećevica, part of Split-Dalmatia County, Croatia.

The pit cave is infamous as a site where during and after World War II, the Yugoslav Partisans used for the disposal of bodies of thousands of local Croatian civilians that they executed. Those executed were deemed to be Axis collaborators or enemies of the Communist regime.

The pit cave has a funnel form, which, at the widest part, is about 30 metres wide. In the middle of the pit cave there is carbonated "skittle" made of limestone and other materials of karst.

On 22 August 2015, a European Day of Remembrance for Victims of Stalinism and Nazism, a county commemoration for victims of all anti-fascistic and communistic crimes in Croatia, was held here.
