= List of prefects of Šibenik-Knin County =

Prefect of the Šibenik-Knin County
- Župan Šibensko-kninske županije
- Coat of arms of Šibenik-Knin County
- Incumbent; Paško Rakić since 11 June 2025
- Appointer: Direct elections
- Term length: 4 years unlimited number of renewals
- Inaugural holder: Paško Bubalo (Prefect of Šibenik County); Ivo Baica (Prefect of Šibenik-Knin County)
- Formation: 1993 (Prefect of Šibenik County); 1997 (Prefect of Šibenik-Knin County)
- Website: www.sibensko-kninska-zupanija.hr

This is a list of prefects of Šibenik-Knin County.

== Prefects of Šibenik County (1993–1997) ==
Croatian Democratic Union (HDZ)

№	Portrait	Name (Born–Died)	Term of Office		Party
1		Paško Bubalo (1933–)	4 May 1993	12 April 1994	HDZ
2		Ivo Baica (1953–2003)	12 April 1994	17 May 1997	HDZ

== Prefects of Šibenik-Knin County (1997–present) ==
Croatian Democratic Union (HDZ) Independent

№	Portrait	Name (Born–Died)	Term of Office		Party
1 (2)		Ivo Baica (1953–2003)	17 May 1997	22 February 2000	HDZ
2 (3)		Gordan Baraka (1948–2018)	22 February 2000	22 May 2002	HDZ
3 (4)		Duje Stančić (1955–)	20 June 2002	25 September 2006	HDZ
4 (5)		Goran Pauk (1962–)	25 September 2006	4 June 2021	HDZ
5 (6)		Marko Jelić (1976–)	4 June 2021	11 June 2025	Independent
6 (7)		Paško Rakić (1981–)	11 June 2025	Incumbent	HDZ

== See also ==
- Šibenik-Knin County
