= Primorski Dolac =

Municipality in Split-Dalmatia County, Croatia

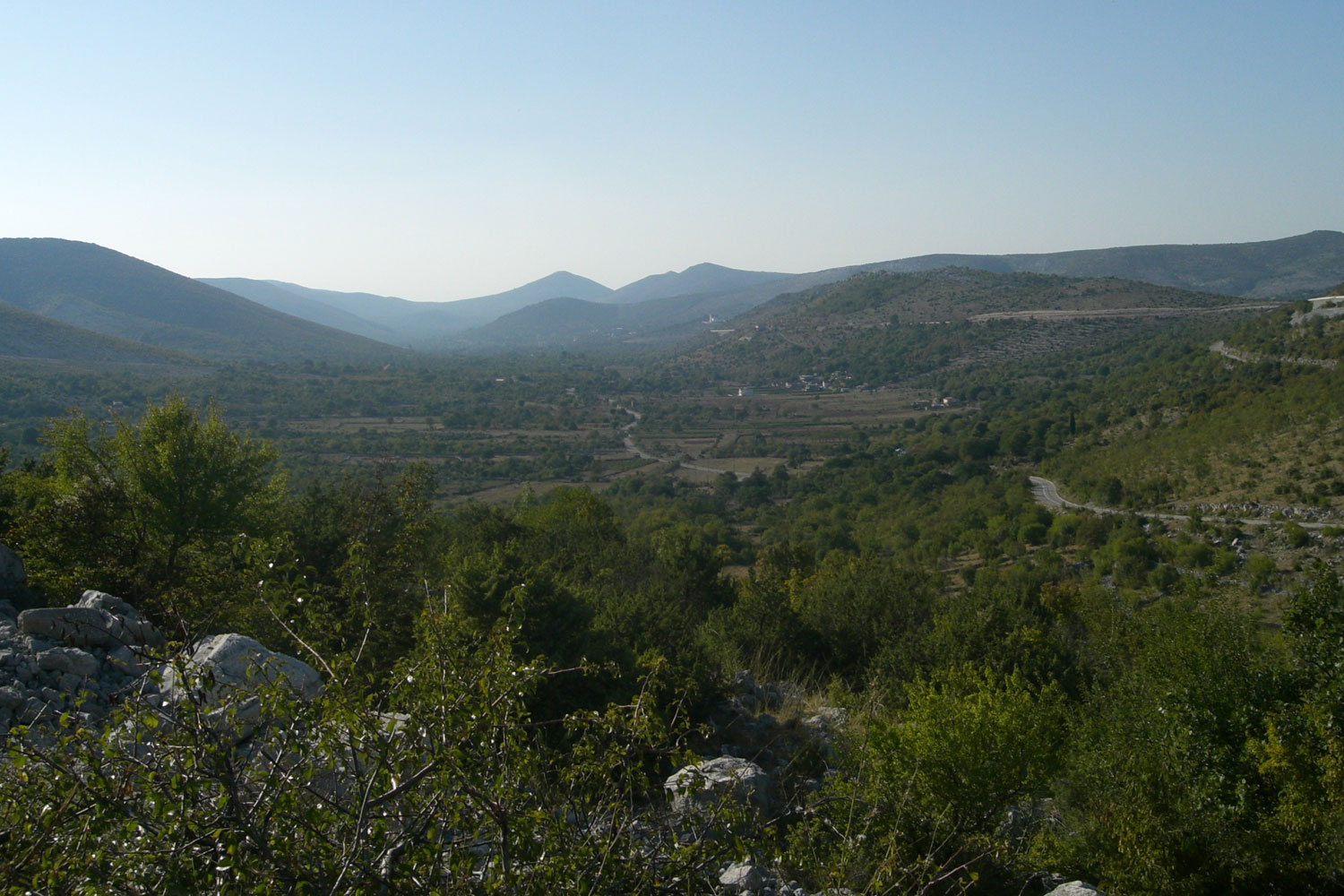
- Interactive map of Primorski Dolac
- Location within Croatia
- Coordinates: 43°37′50.88″N 16°10′33.96″E
- Country: Croatia
- Region: Dalmatia
- County: Split-Dalmatia County

Area
  - Total: 32.4 km^{2} (12.5 sq mi)

Population (2021)
  - Total: 686
  - Density: 21.2/km^{2} (54.8/sq mi)
- Time zone: UTC+1 (CET)
  - Summer (DST): UTC+2 (CEST)
- Website: primorskidolac.hr

Primorski Dolac (pronounced [prǐmɔrskiː dɔ̌lat͡s]) is a municipality in Croatia in the Split-Dalmatia County. It has a population of 686 (2021 census), absolute majority of whom are Croats.

== Demographics ==
Primorski Dolac: Population trends 1857–2021
v

population	805	825	849	991	1043	1213	1438	1571	1516	1591	1685	1546	1197	999	839	770	686
	1857	1869	1880	1890	1900	1910	1921	1931	1948	1953	1961	1971	1981	1991	2001	2011	2021

Sources: Croatian Bureau of Statistics publications
