= Josipa Rimac =

Croatian politician

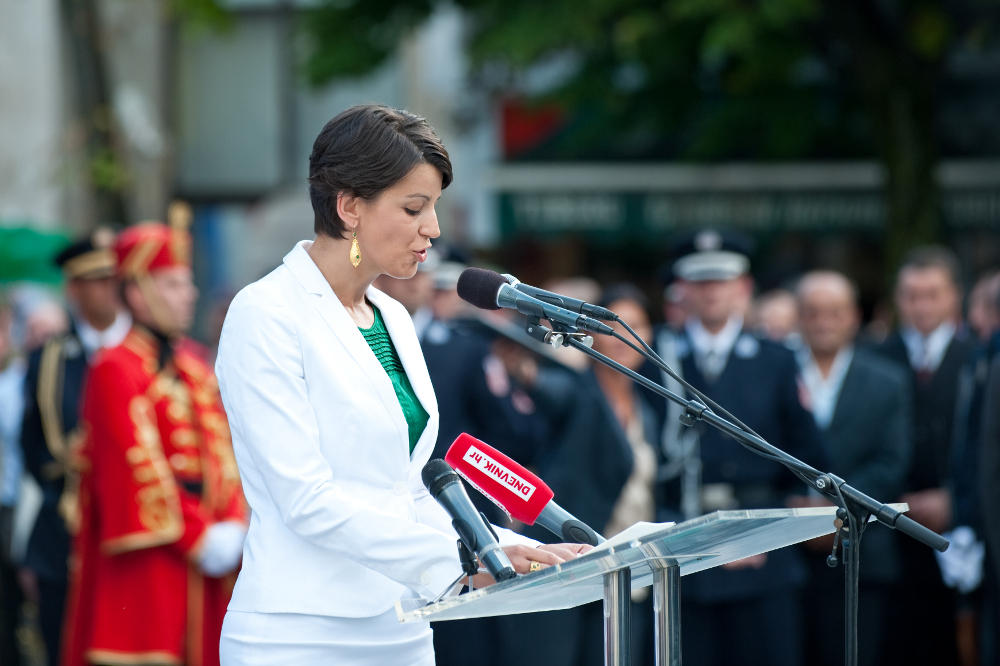
- Josipa Rimac speaking in Knin, 4 August 2011

Mayor of Knin
- In office 10 June 2005 – 18 September 2015
- Succeeded by: Nikola Blažević (acting); Marko Jelić

Member of the Croatian Parliament
- In office 18 September 2015 – 14 October 2016
- Preceded by: Božidar Kalmeta
- Constituency: IX electoral district

Personal details
- Born: Josipa Čulina; 25 February 1980 (age 46) Lukar near Promina, SR Croatia, SFR Yugoslavia
- Party: Croatian Democratic Union (1998–2020)
- Spouses: Danijel Rimac (m. 2000; div. 2023); Josip Pleslić (m. 2023)
- Children: 1
- Education: VERN University

Josipa Pleslić (née Čulina; born 25 February 1980), best known under her former name Josipa Rimac, is a Croatian politician who served as Mayor of Knin for three terms between 2005 and 2015. She was a member of the centre-right Croatian Democratic Union. Rimac was elected mayor in June 2005 at age 25, making her the country's youngest mayor since its independence in 1991.

Born in Lukar (part of Promina municipality), Rimac attended the first four years of school in Knin, until the Croatian War of Independence broke out in the 1990s. She then attended schools in Rijeka and Split, returning to Knin in October 1995 once the battle for the city had ended. Having graduated highschool, Rimac enrolled VERN University, where she studied economics and learned English. She also spent a lot of time volunteering for the local Red Cross organization in Knin, and was named Director of Knin's Red Cross organization in 2000 as the youngest director in the country. In 2005, Rimac was promoted to Director of the Red Cross in Šibenik-Knin County. Both of these were volunteer positions. She began involving herself in politics as a school pupil, later becoming a member of the Croatian Democratic Union. On 10 June 2005, she was elected Mayor of Knin. In September 2015, Rimac submitted her resignation to the position of mayor so that she could "participate in the HDZ's election campaign for the 2015 parliamentary election."

On 25 September 2015, the Croatian Parliament unanimously took away Rimac's parliamentary immunity, thereby allowing the State Attorney's Office (DORH) to continue the investigation against her for the suspected illegal acquisition of an apartment and defrauding the state of more than 500,000 Croatian kunas during her term as mayor.

In May 2020, Rimac was taken into police custody under charges of corruption.

Josipa Rimac and her former husband Danijel Rimac have a daughter. Josipa and Danijel divorced sometime between 2020 and 2023, after which she married Josip Pleslić and took his last name.
