= Prgomet =

Municipality in Split-Dalmatia County, Croatia

- Location within Croatia
- Coordinates: 43°36′58″N 16°13′48″E
- Country: Croatia
- Region: Dalmatia
- County: Split-Dalmatia County

Area
  - Total: 77.4 km^{2} (29.9 sq mi)

Population (2021)
  - Total: 498
  - Density: 6.43/km^{2} (16.7/sq mi)
- Time zone: UTC+1 (CET)
  - Summer (DST): UTC+2 (CEST)
- Website: opcina-prgomet.hr

Prgomet is a village and a municipality in Croatia in the Split-Dalmatia County.

In the 2021 census, it had a total population of 498, in the following settlements:

- Bogdanovići, population 184
- Labin, population 97
- Prgomet, population 105
- Sitno, population 144
- Trolokve, population 143

In the same census, 99.41% were Croats.
