= St. John's Fortress, Šibenik =

Coordinates: 43.7397°N 15.8938°E

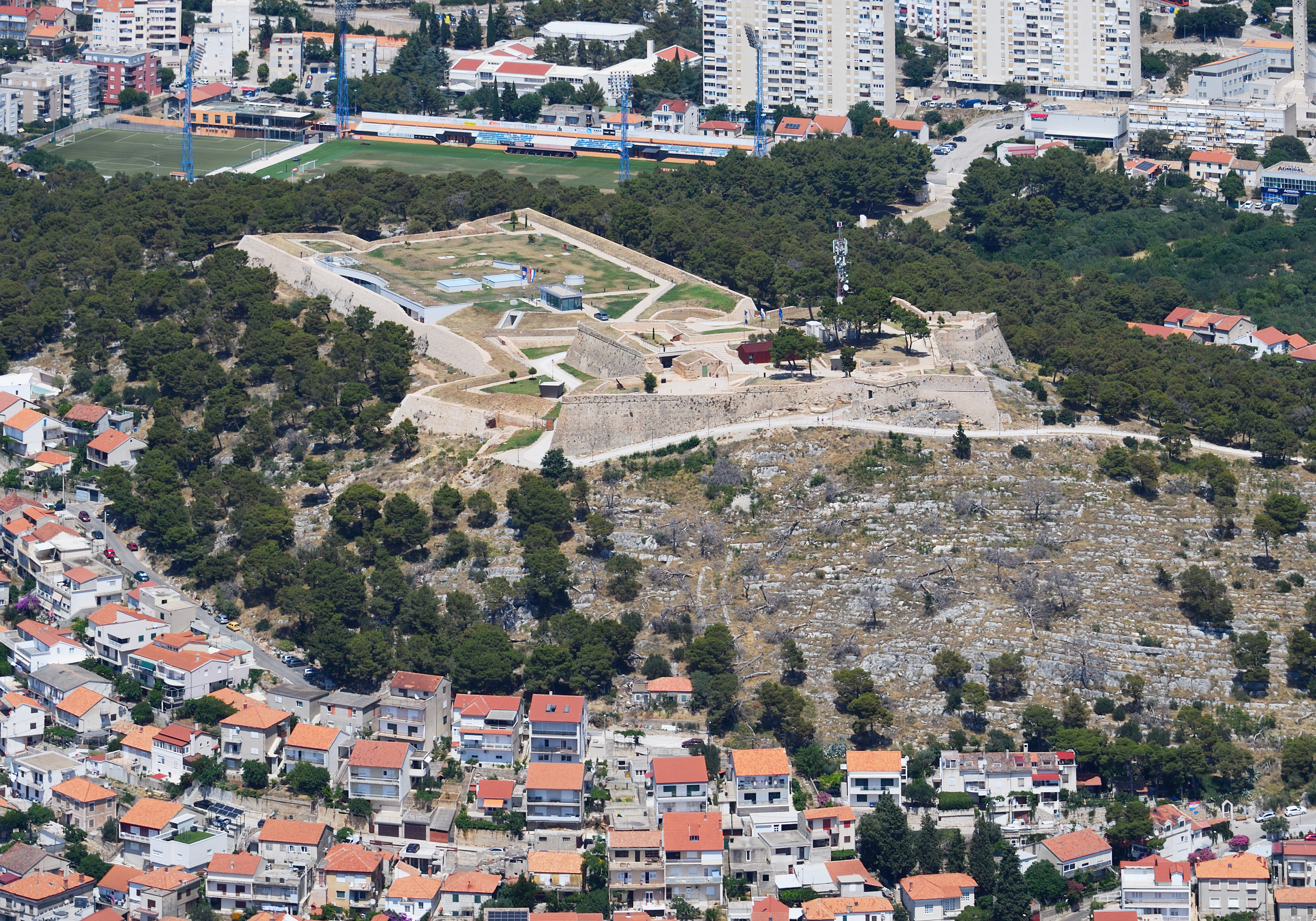
Aerial view of St. John's Fortress

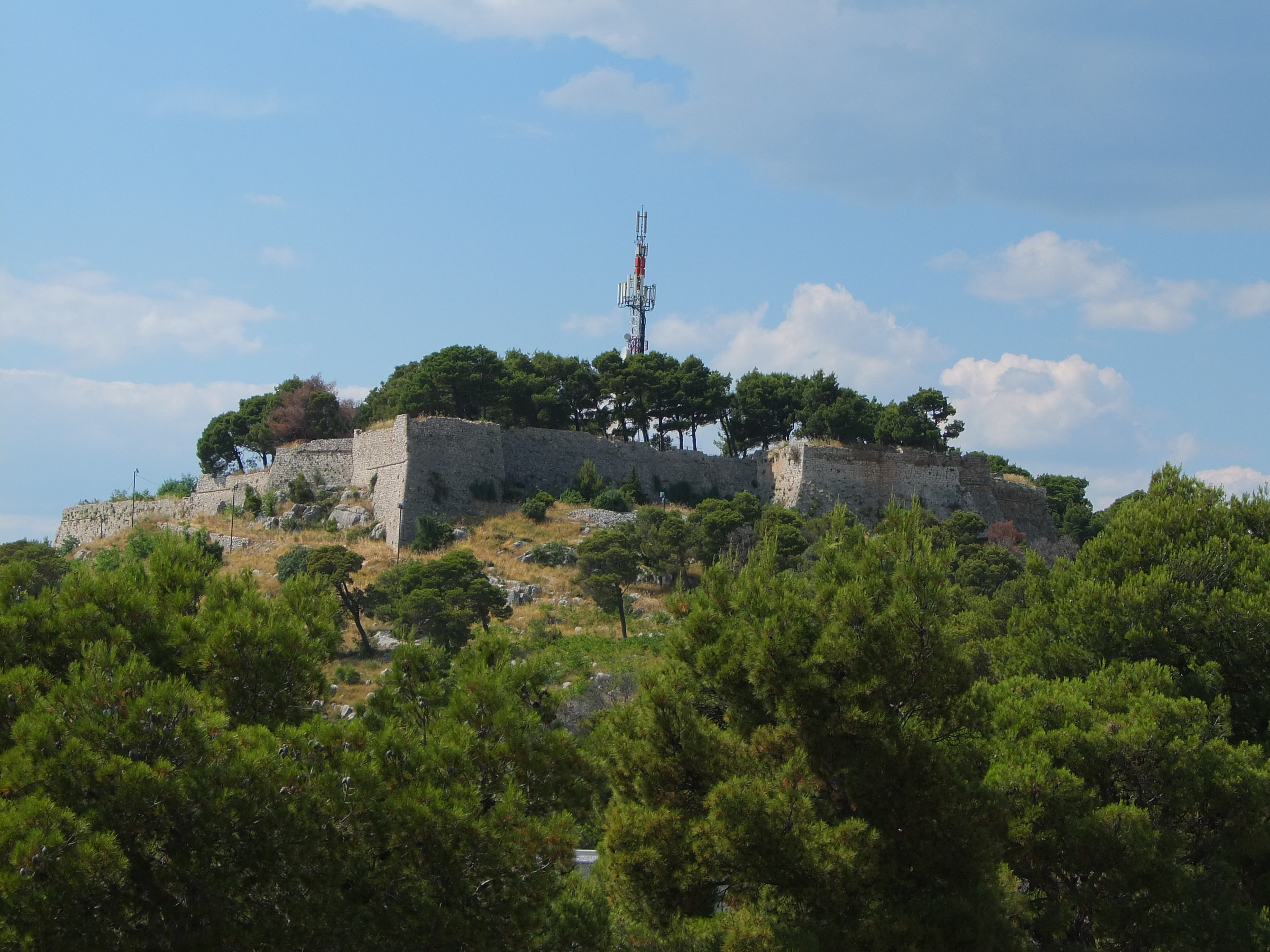
St. John's Fortress

St. John's Fortress (also known as Tanaja; Croatian: Tvrđava sv. Ivana) is an early modern fortress in Šibenik, Croatia, situated atop a hill north of the city's historical center. Named after a medieval church dedicated to St. John the Baptist that had stood there from at least 1444, the fortress, together with the adjacent Barone Fortress, was built during the Cretan War and successfully repelled consecutive Ottoman attacks in 1646 and 1647. A local name for the fortress, Tanaja, comes from one of its structures, a plier-shaped outwork, or tenaille (Italian tenaglia).

== History ==
At the beginning of the Cretan War, the city of Šibenik was in dire need of additional fortifications. The citizens had been dreading the possibility of enemy attack from the hills above the city and pleading with the Venetian senate for their fortification since the 1520s. In the spring of 1646, a Genoese engineer in the Venetian service, Father Antonio Leni, designed a simple symmetric fort with its front hornwork elongated towards the enemy and two flanking demi-bastions on the side towards the city. Although the Venetian war council did not allocate funds for the construction, they also did not forbid the citizens to build the fortress themselves. And so, according to Leni's plan, the development began. The groundwork was done on 1 August 1646, and the whole fortress was completed in just 58 days. Although built in haste and lacking certain elements, St. John's Fortress played a key role in city's defense against the Ottomans in October 1646 and especially during the month-long siege in August and September 1647, when around 7,000 defenders managed to repel 25,000 Ottoman soldiers who had already conquered parts of the fortress.

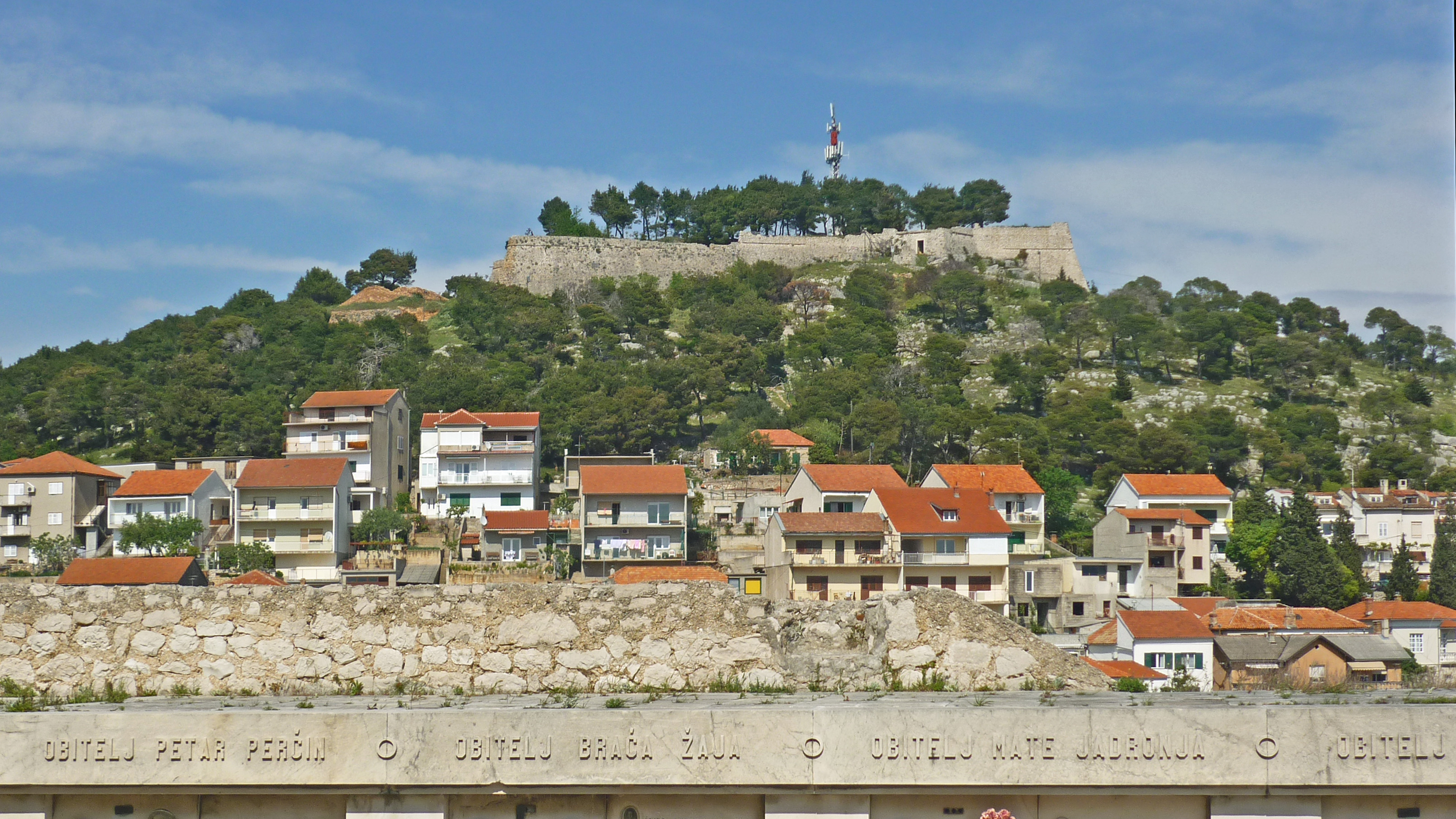
View from the bottom of the hill

As the most modern, strongest and highest fortification, St. John's Fortress assumed the central role of Šibenik defence. The basic form and structures of the fortress have remained intact until today, as is witnessed by numerous graphic depictions throughout the last three centuries. Venetian, Austrian and Yugoslav military forces have occupied the fortress and left their mark in small-scale interventions on various facilities, depending on their needs. As the fortress was losing its primary function, parts of the defensive structures were more and more neglected, becoming obsolete and devastated. During the last few decades, the citizens of Šibenik have used this area, already completely covered with Aleppo pine forest, as a pathway and viewpoint.

== Architecture ==
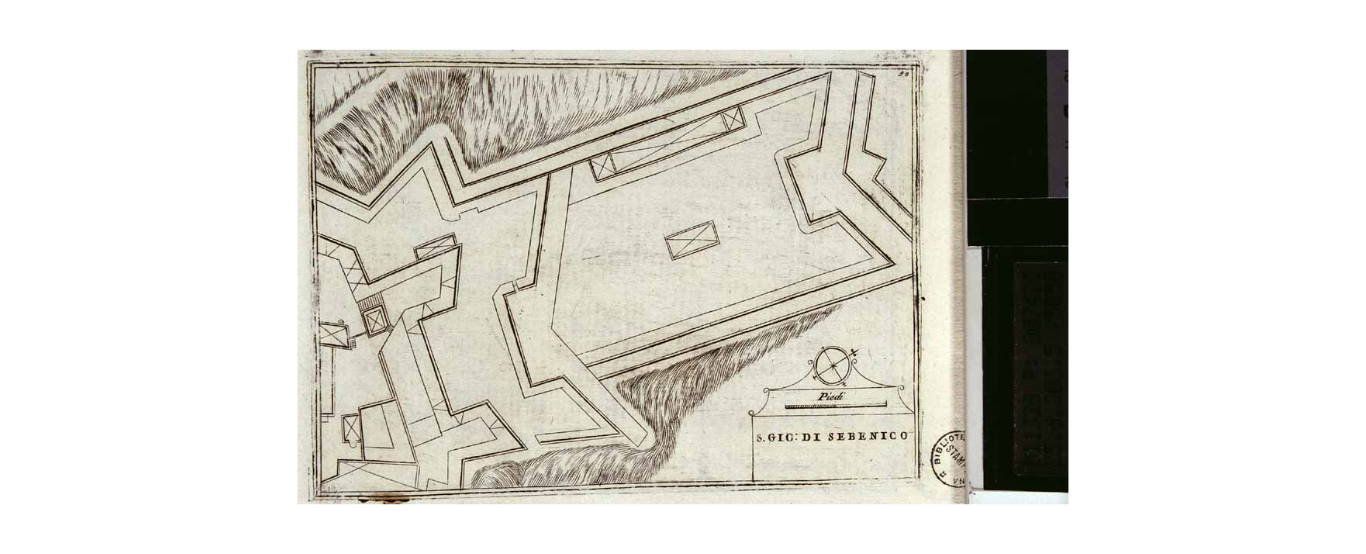
17th-century plan of part of the fortress

The first construction phase, in 1646, consisted of a dry-stone star-shaped fort, built around the foundations of St. John's chapel. Many adaptations between 1646 and the mid-1660s resulted in a shape similar to today's. It is worth noting that the Fortress of St. John, at the time not even fully completed, in 1647 repulsed what was almost certainly the largest invading army in Dalmatia since Roman times.

== Revitalization project ==
The Revitalization of St. John's Fortress project, costing €6.7M, is currently (as of 2017) underway, with the fortress's planned re-opening for visitors scheduled in 2021.
