= List of mayors of Šibenik =

Mayor of the City of Šibenik
- Gradonačelnik Grada Šibenika
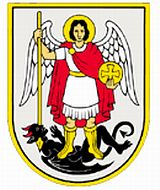
- Coat of arms of Šibenik
- Incumbent; Željko Burić since 10 June 2013
- Appointer: Direct elections
- Term length: 4 years unlimited number of renewals
- Inaugural holder: Ante Šupuk
- Formation: 1993
- Website: sibenik.hr

This article contains a list of people who have served as mayor of Šibenik, the largest city in Šibenik-Knin County, and the tenth largest city in Croatia, since the establishment of the Republic of Croatia.

No.	Picture	Name (Birth–Death)	Term of office		Elected	Political party
1		Ante Šupuk (1942–)	1993	1997	1993	Independent (HDZ-HSLS)
2		Franko Čeko	1997	27 February 2001	1997	Croatian Democratic Union
3		Milan Arnautović	2001	23 February 2004	2001	Social Democratic Party
4		Nedjeljka Klarić (1954–)	16 May 2004	18 June 2009	2004; 2005	Croatian Democratic Union
5		Ante Županović (1949–)	18 June 2009	10 June 2013	2009	Independent (SDP-HNS)
6		Željko Burić (1955–)	10 June 2013	Incumbent	2013; 2017; 2021	Croatian Democratic Union

== See also ==
- List of mayors in Croatia
