= Lećevica =

Municipality in Split-Dalmatia County, Croatia

- Municipality
- Location of Lećevica in Croatia
- Coordinates: 43°38′56″N 16°20′56″E
- Country: Croatia
- Region: Dalmatian Hinterland
- County: Split-Dalmatia County

Area
  - Municipality: 87.6 km^{2} (33.8 sq mi)
  - Urban: 27.0 km^{2} (10.4 sq mi)

Population (2021)
  - Municipality: 495
  - Density: 5.65/km^{2} (14.6/sq mi)
  - Urban: 177
  - Urban density: 6.56/km^{2} (17.0/sq mi)
- Website: lecevica.hr

Lećevica is a village and a municipality in Croatia in the Split-Dalmatia County.

== Geography ==
Keva's pit cave is located within the municipality of Lećevica.

== Demographics ==
In the 2011 census, it had a total population of 583, in the following settlements:

- Divojevići, population 49
- Kladnjice, population 142
- Lećevica, population 218
- Radošić, population 174

In the same census, 95% were Croats.

Lećevica: Population trends 1857–2021
v

population	2031	2252	2408	2605	2793	3066	2981	3100	2851	2825	2584	2075	1480	1041	740	583	495
	1857	1869	1880	1890	1900	1910	1921	1931	1948	1953	1961	1971	1981	1991	2001	2011	2021

Sources: Croatian Bureau of Statistics publications
