= Suhač =

Settlement in Split-Dalmatia County, Croatia

- Settlement
- Interactive map of Suhač
- Location within Croatia
- Coordinates: 43°42′51″N 16°38′02″E
- Country: Croatia
- County: Split-Dalmatia
- City: Sinj

Area
  - Total: 3.0 km^{2} (1.2 sq mi)

Population (2021)
  - Total: 577
  - Density: 190/km^{2} (500/sq mi)
- Time zone: UTC+1 (CET)
  - Summer (DST): UTC+2 (CEST)
- Postal code: 21230 Sinj
- Area code: +385 (0)21

Suhač is a settlement in the City of Sinj in Croatia. In 2021, its population was 577.

== Demographics ==
Suhač: Population trends 1857–2021
v

population	214		213	168	269	268			484	504	559	584	658	586	573	571	577
	1857	1869	1880	1890	1900	1910	1921	1931	1948	1953	1961	1971	1981	1991	2001	2011	2021

Sources: Croatian Bureau of Statistics publications
