= Oklaj =

- Village
- Location of Oklaj within Croatia
- Coordinates: 43°57′N 16°05′E
- Country: Croatia
- County: Šibenik-Knin County
- Municipality: Promina

Area
  - Total: 13.3 km^{2} (5.1 sq mi)
- Elevation: 274 m (899 ft)

Population (2021)
  - Total: 410
  - Density: 31/km^{2} (80/sq mi)
- Time zone: UTC+1 (CET)
  - Summer (DST): UTC+2 (CEST)

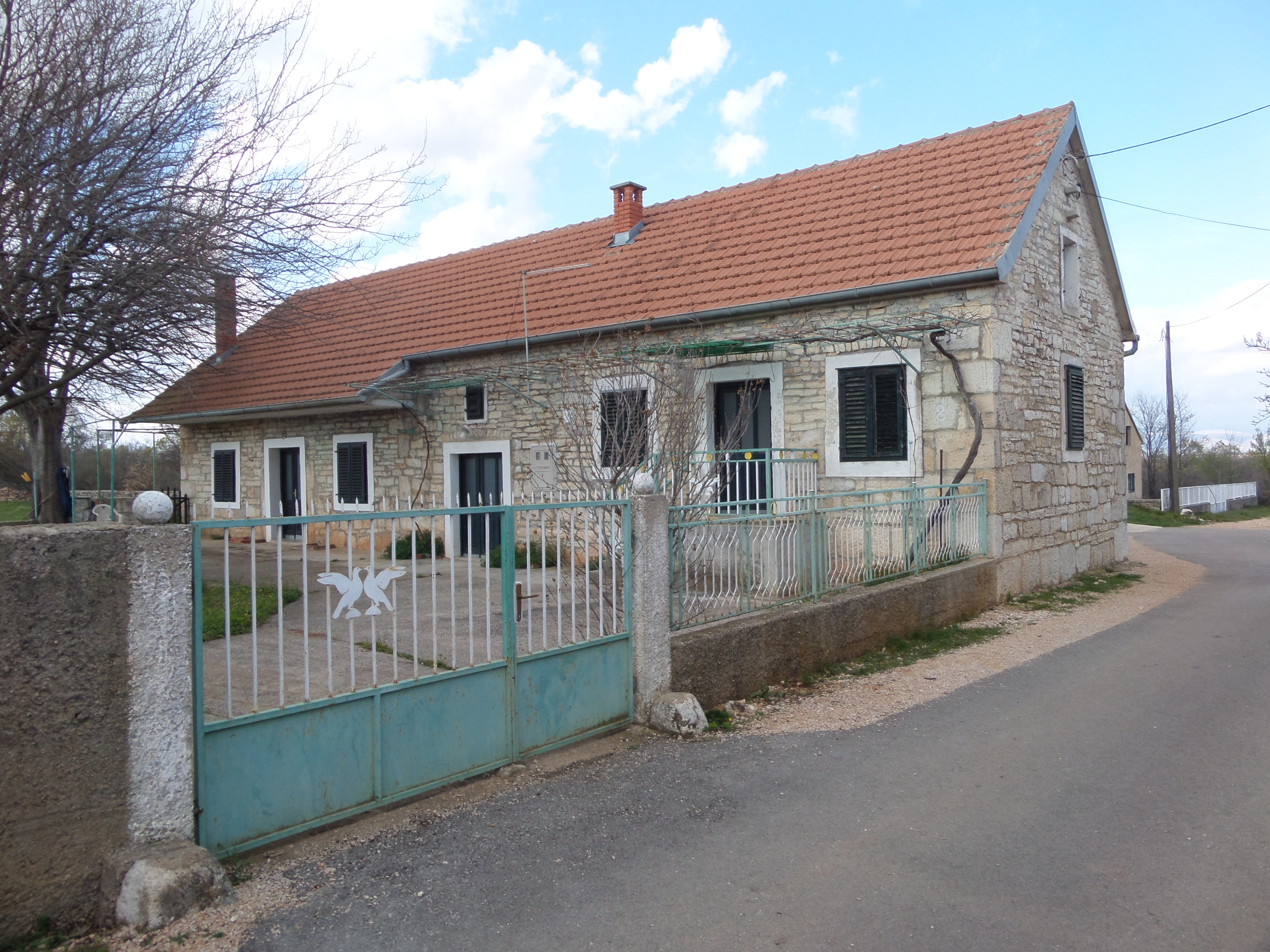
Brick/Stone house in Oklaj.

Oklaj is a village in the Šibenik-Knin County of Croatia.

It is located in inland of the Dalmatia Adriatic coastline, about 15 km south of Knin and 14 km northwest of Drniš. It is situated between the southwest slopes of Promina mountain and the southern bank of the Krka river. Its favourable geographic position in the south-western part of Dinaric regions, provides an excellent connection for traffic between Central Croatia inland and the Adriatic Sea.

Oklaj is the administrative centre of the Promina municipality. In 2011 it had a population of 469 inhabitants.
