= Antun Vrančić Gymnasium =

- Gimnazija Antuna Vrančića
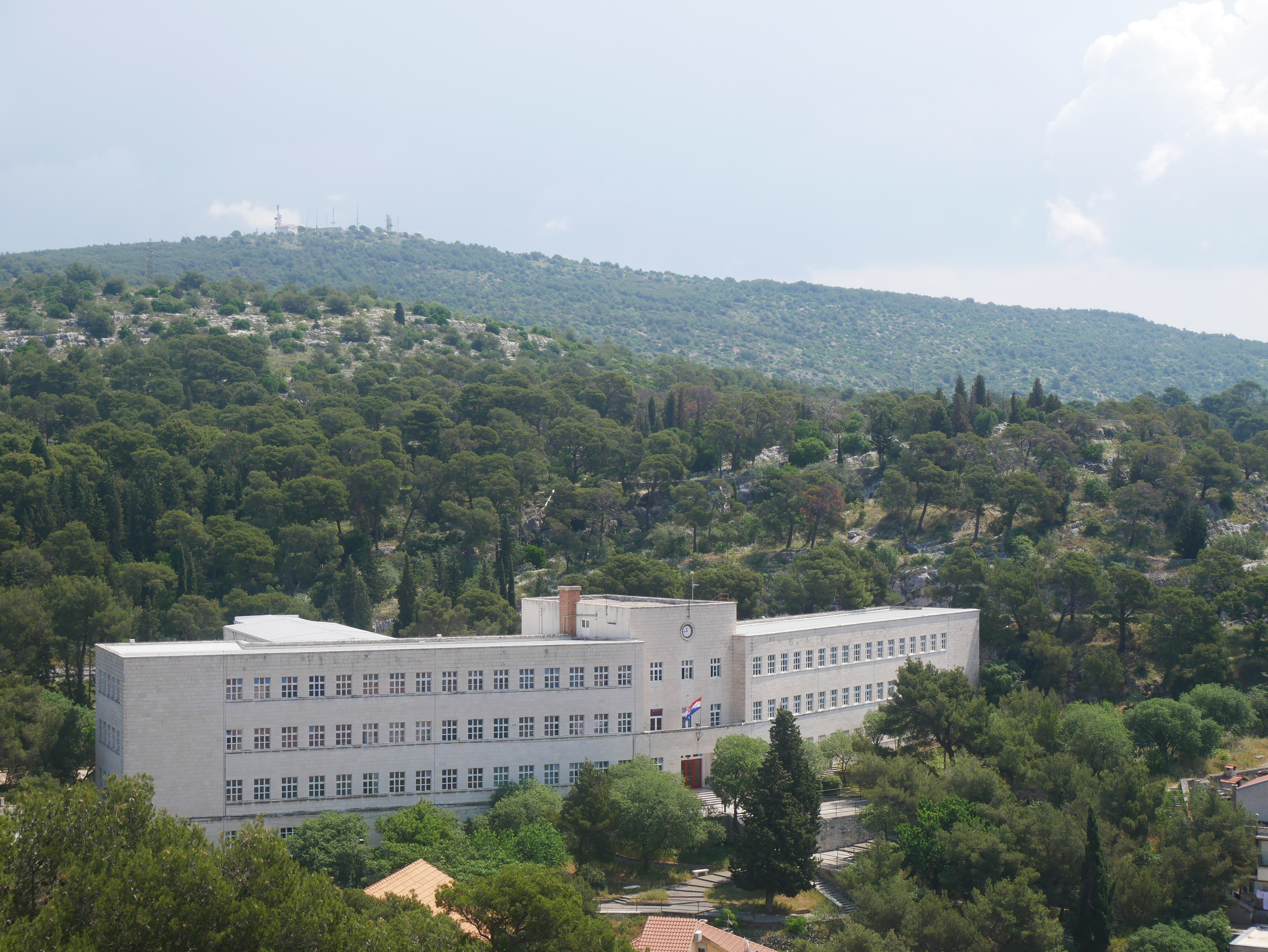
- School building

Location
- Put Gimnazije 64; Šibenik, 22000; Croatia; 43.73658°N 15.8993°E

Information
- Type: public
- Founded: 1909
- Area trustee: Šibenik-Knin County
- Principal: Josip Paić
- Faculty: 47
- Secondary years taught: 9–12
- Age range: 14-18
  - Grade 9: 156 (2024–25)
- Average class size: 26
- Team name: ŠŠD Gimnazijalac
- Newspaper: Pegla
- Website: Antun Vrančić Gymnasium (in Croatian)

The Antun Vrančić Gymnasium (Croatian: Gimnazija Antuna Vrančića) is a public gymnasium (a 4-year general-education high school) in Šibenik, Croatia. It currently offers programs focusing on mathematics and natural sciences, classics, linguistics, as well as a general-track program. The school was named after Antun Vrančić (1504–1573), a native of Šibenik.

== History ==
First modern high school was opened for a short time in Šibenik during Napoleon's rule in Dalmatia in 1806. A secondary school with a continuity up till the present-day was opened as Realgymnasium in 1909, while Šibenik and Croatia were a part of Austria-Hungary. School was briefly closed by Italian authorities during the 1918-21 occupation of Šibenik. In 1937 the school moved into a new and modern building in which it operates today. During the Second World War, Italian fascists again occupied Šibenik (1941–3) and forbade the use of Croatian, italianizing the school. Many students and alumni joined the Partisans and fought against the Axis. After the war, the school was restructured and named after People's Heroes of Šibenik (Ljubo Truta, Miro Visic, Vlado Peran, Slobodan Macura). In 1991 it was again remodelled as a general gymnasium and named after Antun Vrančić (1504–1573), renaissance humanist, cardinal, diplomat and author from Šibenik.

As of school year 2024/25, the school enrolls multiple different gymnasium (gimnazija) programs: one and a half class language focus (jezična), half a class of classical language focus (klasična), two classes of general gymnasium curriculum (opća), one class of science focus (prirodoslovna), and one class of science and mathematics focus (prirodoslovno-matematička).

== Academics and rankings ==
Following the results of national standardized tests taken by high school students in Croatia in 2006, 2007 and 2008 as a part of a transition towards the introduction of a nationwide exit exam (Matura), Antun Vrančić high school was ranked 24th out of 190 Croatian high schools on an unofficial list.

After the school year 2023/24, 123 graduates of this gymnasium enrolled at an institution of higher learning in Croatia, or 92.48% of students who took up the nationwide Matura exams. The most common destinations for these students were the University of Zagreb faculties of electrical engineering and computing, economics, and humanities and social sciences, as well as the University of Zadar and the University of Split faculty of economics.

School's students also participated in International Mathematical Olympiad twice - in 2001 in Washington, DC and in 2002 in Glasgow, where they won a bronze medal. In 2007 and 2011, Antun Vrančić students competed at International Philosophy Olympiad in Turkey and Austria, respectively, earning an honorable mentioning.

== Notable alumni ==
As up until recently the only general secondary school in Šibenik, the school boasts many famous natives of Šibenik and the surrounding area as its alumni:

- Ivo Brešan (1936–2017), playwright and author
- Gojko Bjedov (1913–1937), trade union leader, volunteer in Spanish civil war (KIA)
- Arsen Dedić (1938–2015), singer-songwriter, composer, poet
- Vladan Desnica (1905–1967), writer and philosopher
- Isak Drutter (1925), economist, university professor, governor of Central Bank of Croatia (1972–1978). Dismissed from school in 1941 under fascist regime
- Vojin Jelić (1921–2004), writer and poet
- Aleksandar Ljahnicky (1921–2004), architect
- Maksim Mrvica (1975), pianist
- Hrvoje Požar (1916–1991), electrical engineer, scholar, and Secretary General of the Croatian Academy of Arts and Sciences
- Anđelko Runjić (1938–2015), politician, last speaker of the parliament in SR Croatia (1986–90) and Croatian ambassador to Russia (1991–1992)
- Ivan Vitić (1917–1986), architect (did not graduate)
- Vice Vukov (1936–2007), singer, philosopher, member of the parliament

== Gallery ==
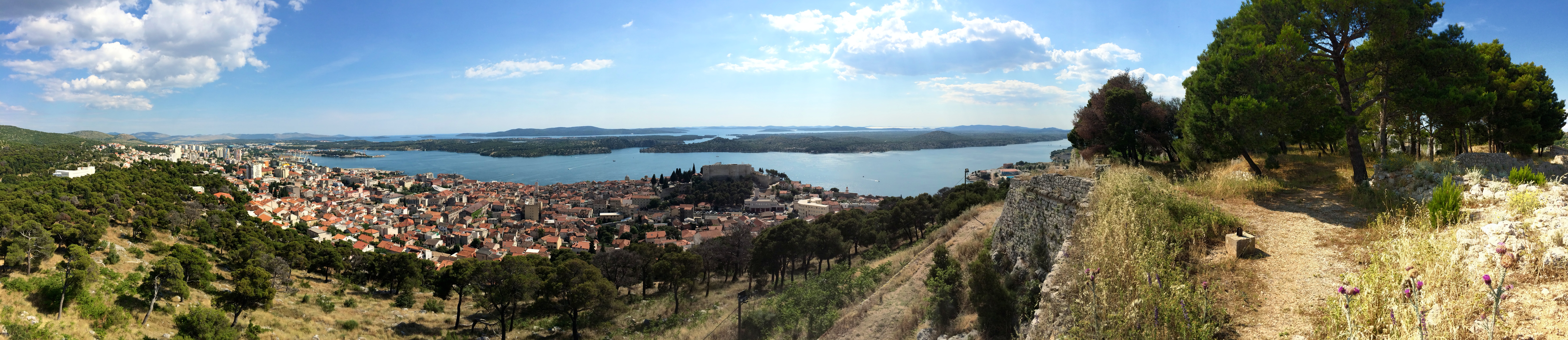
Šibenik cityscape from the north (St. John's fortress). White gymnasium building can be seen on the far left. St. Michael's fortress in centre
