= Goran Pauk =

Croatian politician and footballer

Prefect of the Šibenik-Knin County
- In office 25 September 2006 – 4 June 2021
- Deputy: Nikola Blažević; Darija Puljić; Ognjen Vukmirović (Serb national minority)
- Preceded by: Duje Stančić
- Succeeded by: Marko Jelić

Deputy Mayor of Šibenik
- In office 12 May 2004 – 2005 Serving with Tomislav Ninić
- Succeeded by: Tomislav Jukić

Personal details
- Born: 23 April 1962 (age 64) Šibenik, PR Croatia, FPR Yugoslavia
- Party: HDZ
- Spouse: Katarina Pauk
- Children: 3
- Education: University of Split
- Awards: Order of Nikola Šubić Zrinski
Association football career
Youth career
- 1971–1976: Šibenik
- 1976–1980: Hajduk Split
Senior career*
Years	Team	Apps	(Gls)
1980–1987	Šibenik		
1987	Hajduk Split	17	(0)
1988–1993	Šibenik		
- * Club domestic league appearances and goals

Goran Pauk (born 23 April 1962) is a Croatian politician who served as Prefect of Šibenik-Knin County from 2006 to 2021. He has been the longest-serving prefect of the county since Croatia's independence in 1991.

Before entering politics, he was a professional football player.

Political offices
Preceded by Duje Stančić	Prefect of Šibenik-Knin County; 25 September 2006 – present	Incumbent
