= Gović =

Gović is a Croatian surname. The surname originates from the Adriatic island of Krapanj, where they settled in the 16th century after seeking refuge from the Ottomans. They later settled in parts of the immediate mainland (Brodarica, Žaborić, Jadrtovac). Notable people with the surname include:

- Danira Gović, Croatian actress
- Dražen Gović, Croatian football player
