= Žaborić =

Croatian Village

- Location within Croatia
- Coordinates: 43.661°N 15.947°E
- Country: Croatia
- County: Šibenik-Knin
- City: Šibenik

Area
  - Total: 9.2 km^{2} (3.6 sq mi)

Population (2021)
  - Total: 552
  - Density: 60/km^{2} (160/sq mi)
- Time zone: UTC+1 (CET)
  - Summer (DST): UTC+2 (CEST)

Žaborić is a village in Šibenik Knin County. It is located on the Adriatic Sea by the D8 state road, between villages Grebaštica and Brodarica. The most prominent economic activity is tourism.

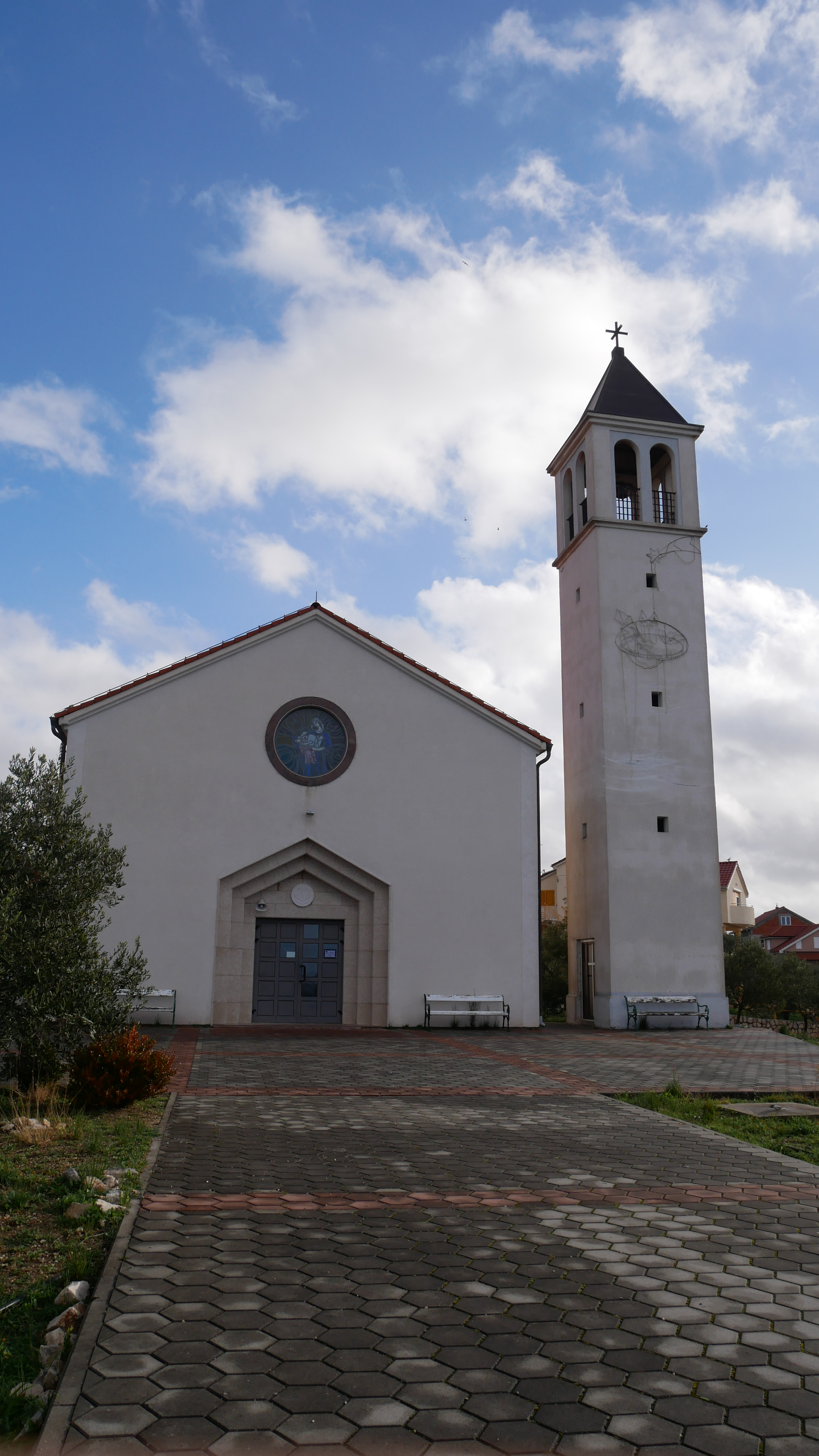
Church of St. Anne in Žaborić

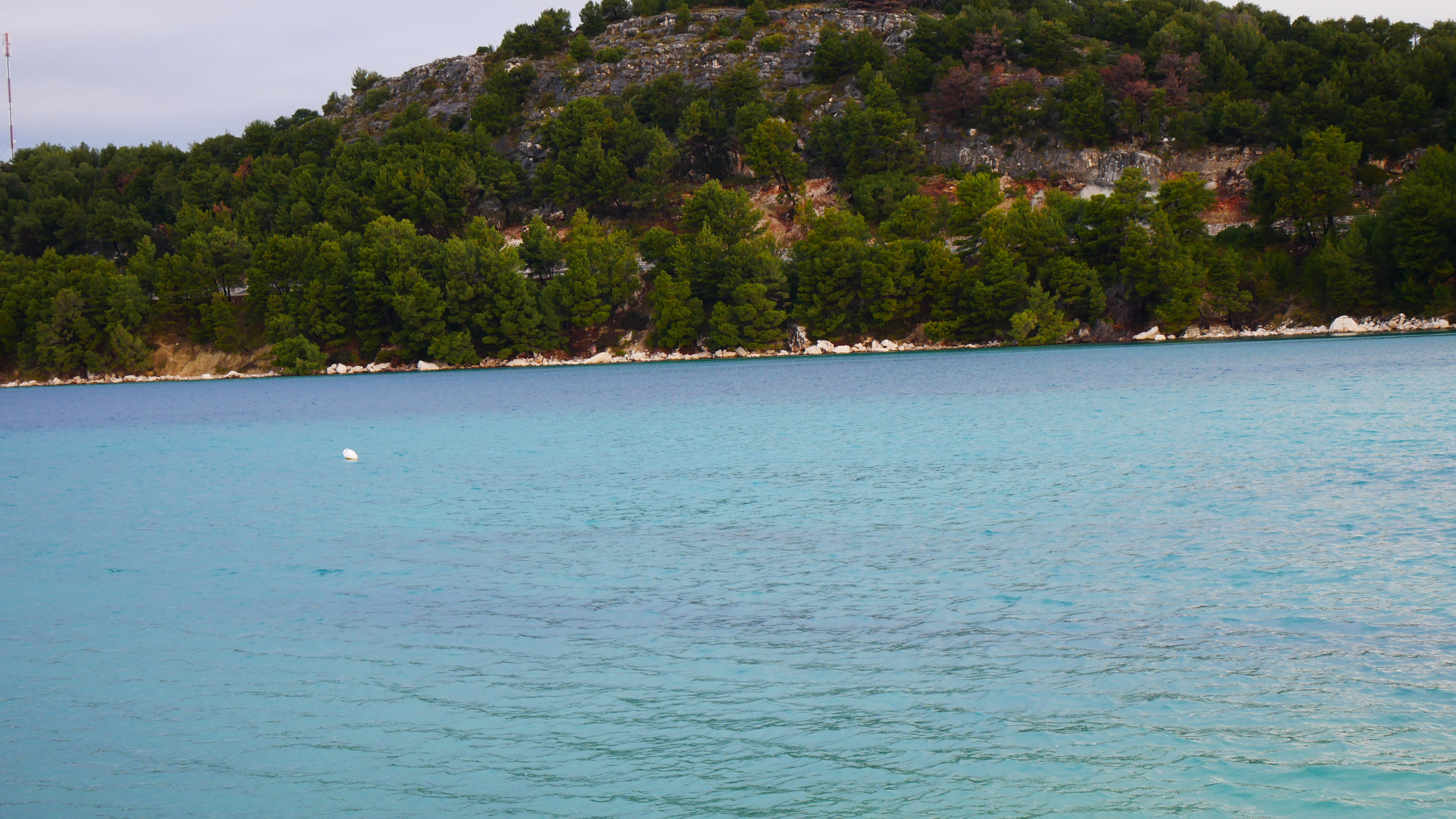
Beautiful nature in Žaborić
