= Brodarica =

Brodarica may refer to:

- Brodarica, Šibenik, a section of Šibenik, Croatia
- Brodarica, Zadar, a section of Zadar, Croatia
