= Šparadići =

View of Sparadici from Grebastica

Sparadici is a small settlement located between Šibenik and Primosten, Croatia. It is a part of a bigger village called Grebaštica. The main economic activity is tourism.
