= Morinje =

- Location within Croatia
- Coordinates: 43.68°N 15.95°E

Morinje (Morinjski zaljev) is the toponym for a bay in Croatia.

The Morinje Bay in Dalmatia, with a surface area of 3.5 km² and a maximum depth of 21 metres, is situated five kilometres south-east of Šibenik in the central part of the eastern Adriatic coast. It is hydrogeomorphologically divided into two parts – a shallow northern funnel (Morinje) and the deeper southern channel-shaped Jadrtovac passage. With the postglacial rising of the sea level, the bay took its current shape. Morinje has no permanent riverine inflow, only an insignificant and intermittent superficial rivulet (Ribnik) and several underwater springs.

In the 13th century, the area at Morinje was mentioned as Campus marinus. A German nobleman in the late 15th century called the place “Moreya”. The historical settlement Jadrtovac developed from a fortification on the eastern shore. North-east of the bay is the Gothic church of Saint Lawrence (Sv. Lovro), the site of pre-Romanesque reliefs. From the 15th century Morinje was known for its salt production. In modern times, economic activities in the area are primarily associated with agriculture and seasonal tourism.
