= Jadrtovac =

- Village
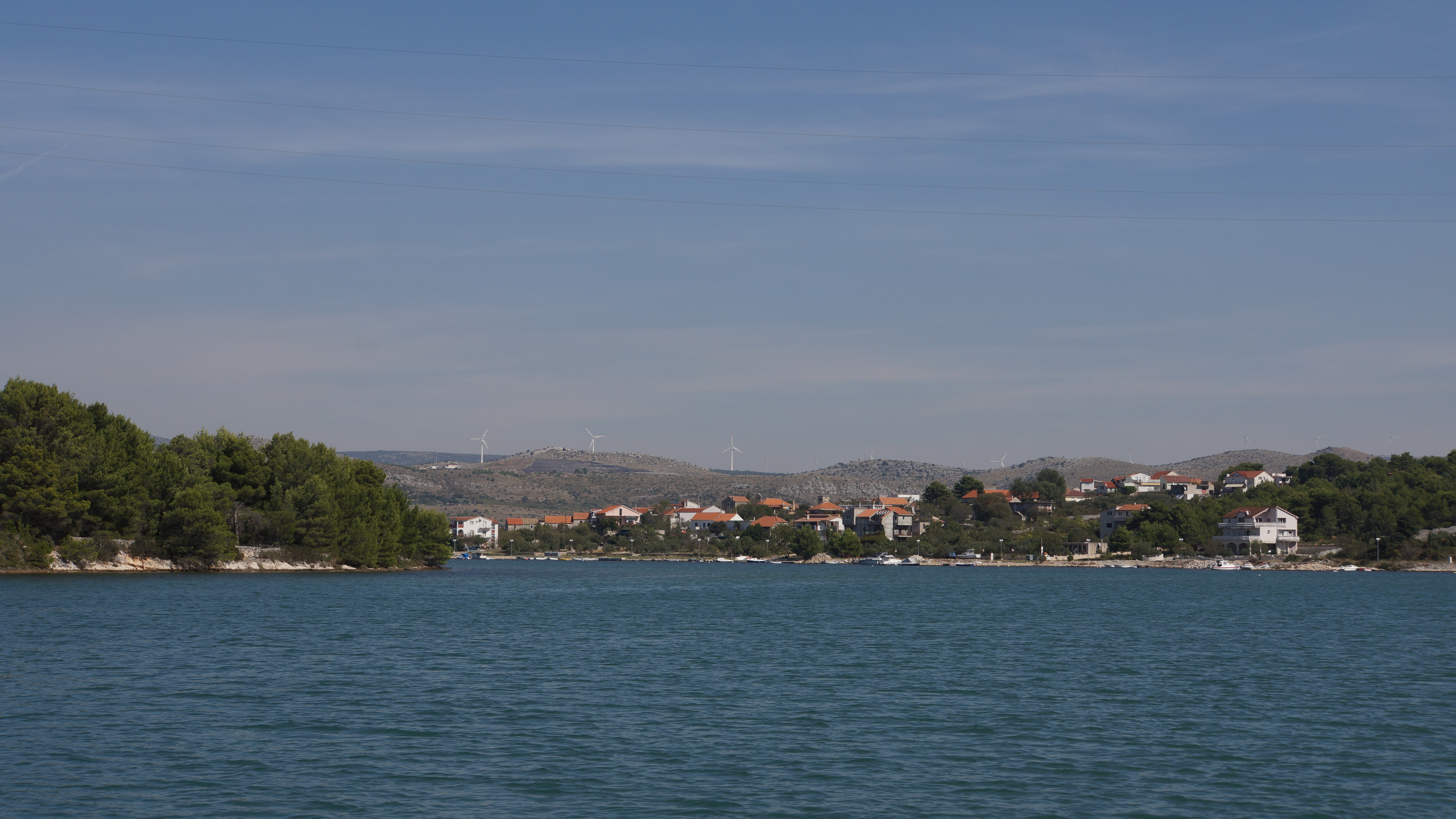

- Location within Croatia
- Coordinates: 43°40′39″N 15°57′01″E
- Country: Croatia
- Region: Dalmatia
- County: Šibenik-Knin County

Area
  - Total: 9.6 km^{2} (3.7 sq mi)

Population (2021)
  - Total: 171
  - Density: 18/km^{2} (46/sq mi)
- Time zone: UTC+1 (CET)
  - Summer (DST): UTC+2 (CEST)

Jadrtovac (hist. Zamurva) is a village in Croatia.

The community of Jadrtovac, with a surface of 24.5 km², is situated eight kilometres south-east of the city Šibenik at the eastern bank of the Morinje Bay. The settlement, which was called Zamurva, developed from a local fortification in possession of the noblemen Andreis. According to a German traveler, the fortification already existed in 1494. After the Morean War at the end of the 17th century, the fortification lost its military significance and was eventually superseded by village buildings. At the beginning of the 1960s and 1990s Jadrtovac had more than 400 inhabitants. The number declined to 171 in 2011.
