= Grebaštica =

Croatian village

- Location within Croatia
- Coordinates: 43°38′N 15°59′E
- Country: Croatia
- County: Šibenik-Knin
- City: Šibenik

Area
  - Total: 18.2 km^{2} (7.0 sq mi)

Population (2021)
  - Total: 890
  - Density: 49/km^{2} (130/sq mi)
- Time zone: UTC+1 (CET)
  - Summer (DST): UTC+2 (CEST)

Grebaštica is a village in Šibenik-Knin County, Croatia. It is located by the Adriatic Sea, 15 km south of Šibenik and 15 km north of Primošten. The main economic activity is tourism.

== Main sights ==
Except beaches, there are other sights worth visiting. The natural water spring – Kanela is located in the upper part of village, called "Gornja Grebaštica". The defensive wall or often called "the Chinese wall" on the peninsula of Oštrica was built in 1497. The wall was built for the purpose of defense in the Croatian–Ottoman wars. "Jama Galešnica" is a cave located after the exit to Galešnica from the D8 road (Croatia)

== Image gallery ==
Fountain in Grebaštica

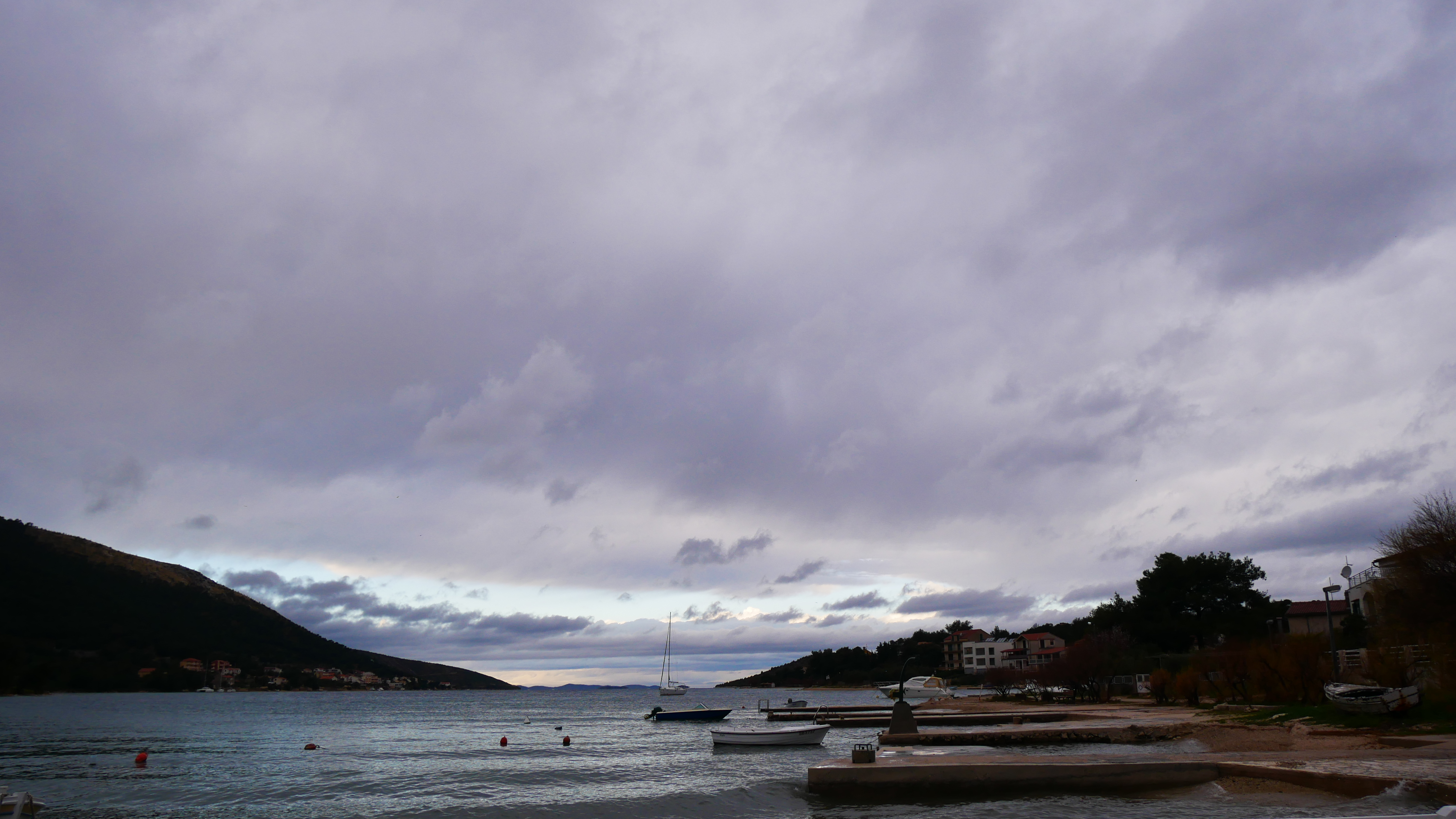
Grebaštica coast and sea

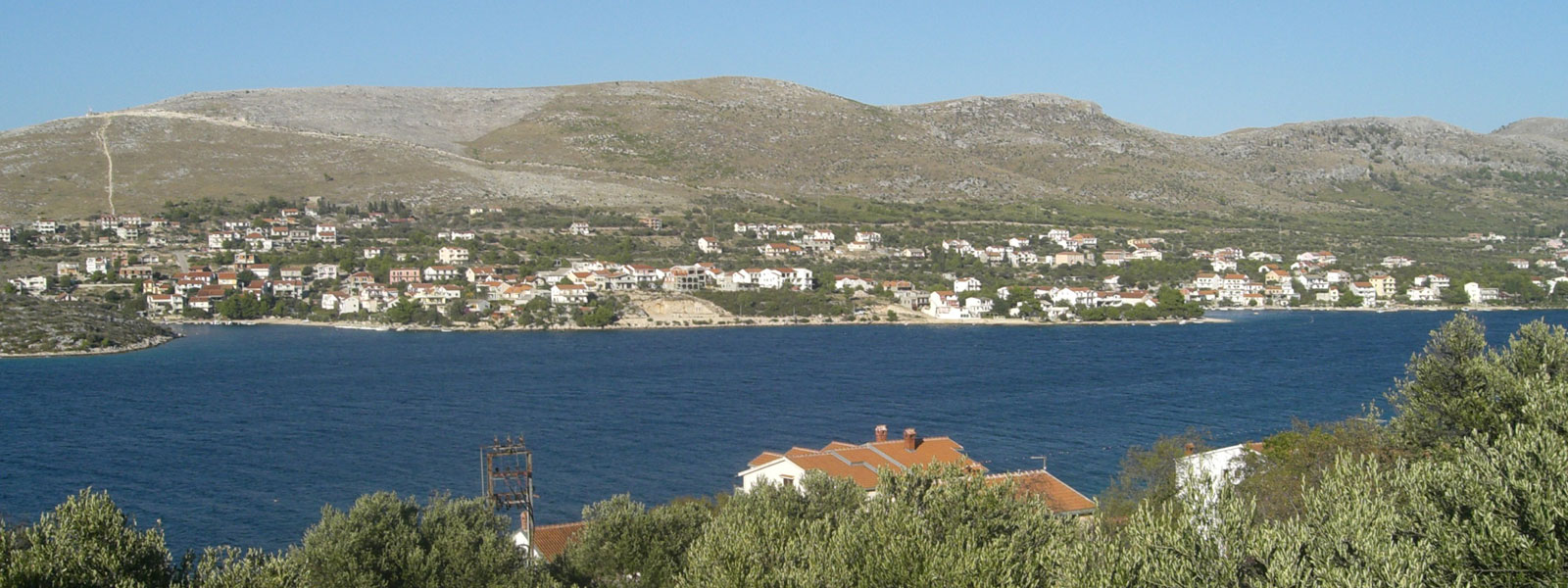
View of Grebaštica from D8 road (Croatia)

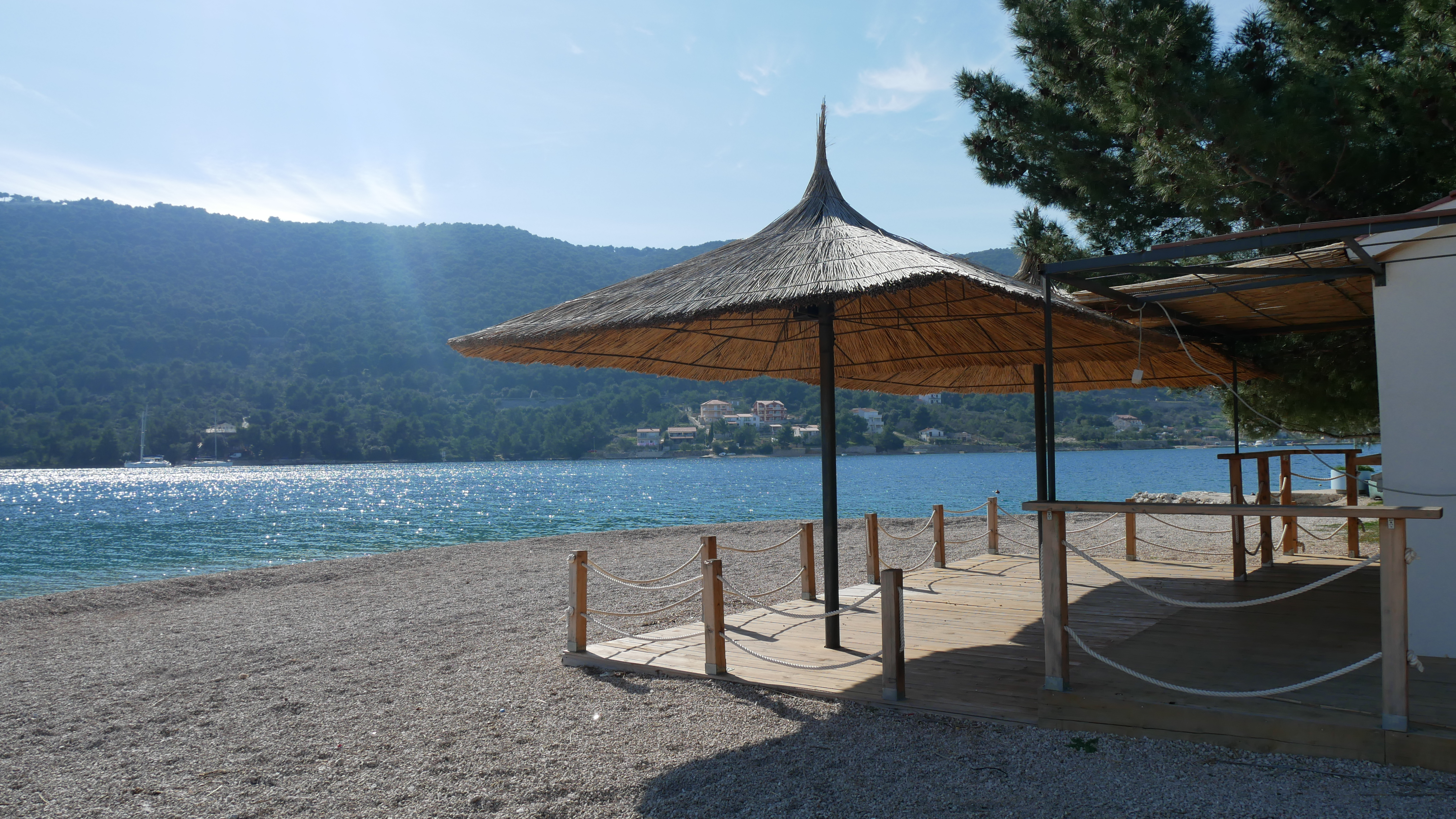
Beach in Grebaštica

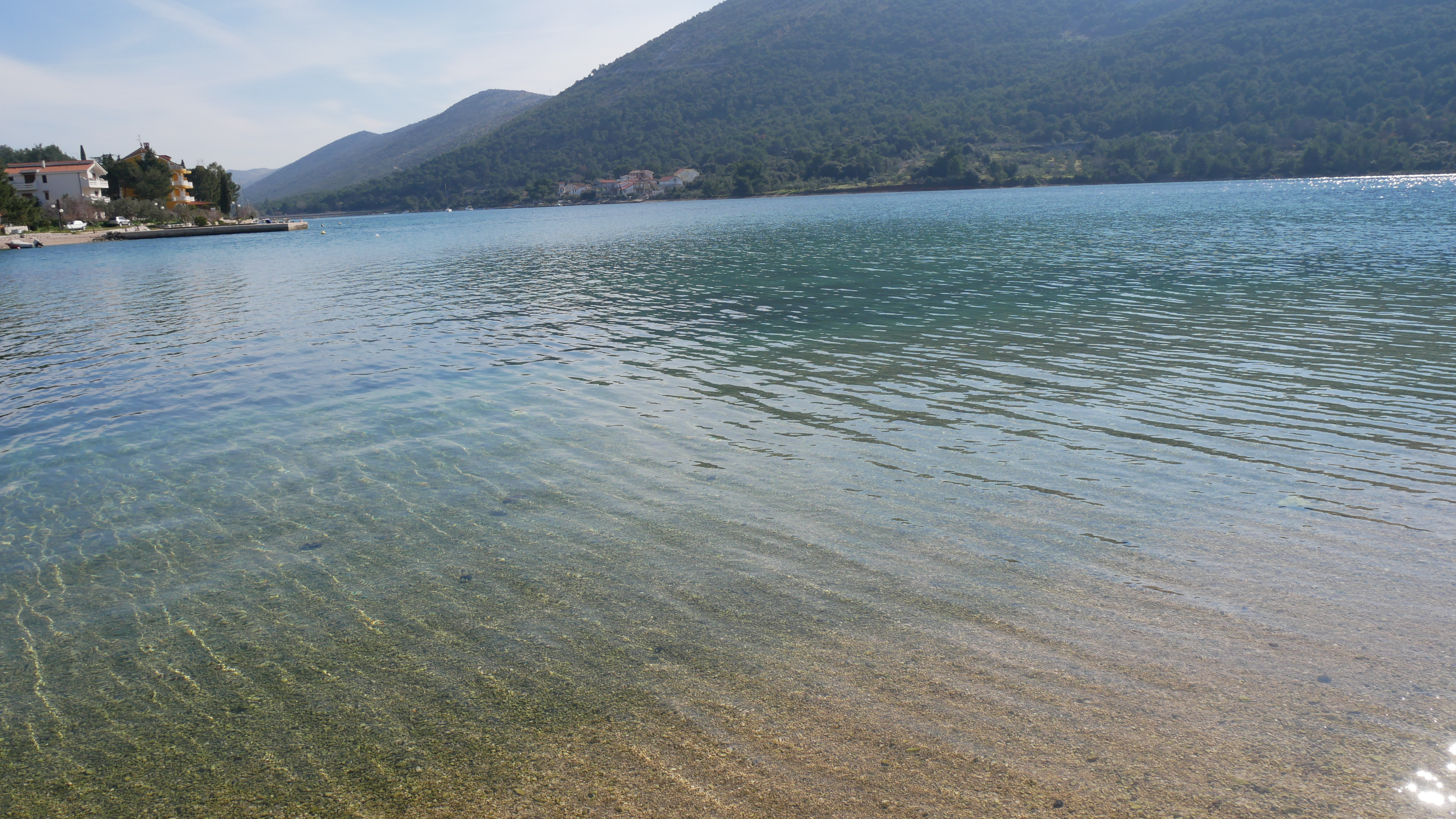
Clean sea

View of Šparadići and Jelinjak hill from Grebaštica
