= Krapanj =

Island in the Adriatic Sea, south of Šibenik, Croatia

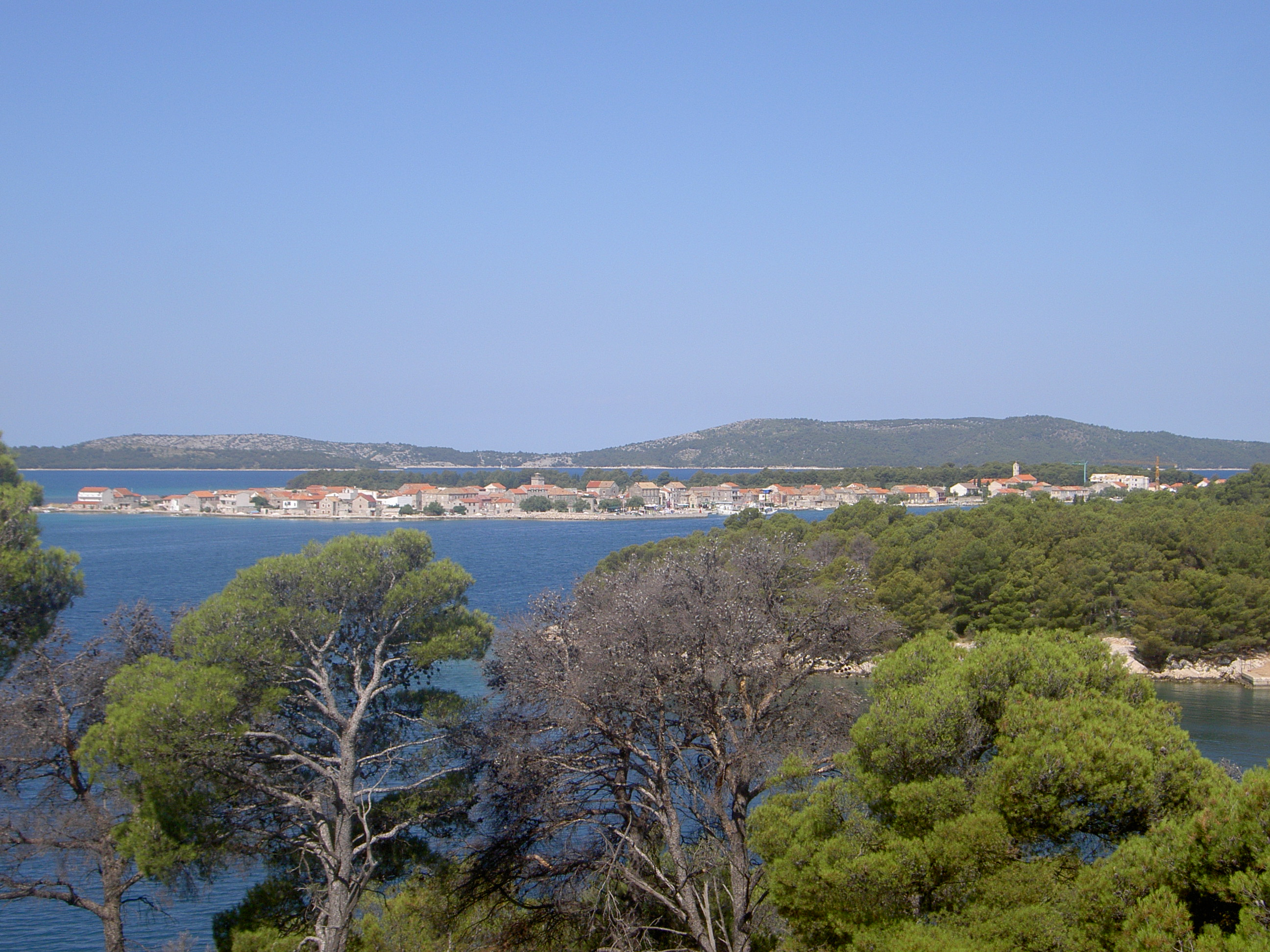

- Location within Croatia
- Interactive map of Krapanj

Geography
- Location: Adriatic Sea
- Coordinates: 43°40′20″N 15°54′50″E
- Area: 0.36 km^{2} (0.14 sq mi)
- Highest elevation: 1.5 m (4.9 ft)

Administration
- Croatia
- County: Šibenik-Knin County
- City: Šibenik
- Largest settlement: Krapanj (pop. 170)

Demographics
- Population: 166 (2021)

Krapanj is an island in the Adriatic Sea, located south of Šibenik, Croatia.

Krapanj is one of the smallest inhabited islands of the Adriatic Sea covering 0.36 km^{2}. It is the lowest island on the Adriatic with an elevation of 1.5m above sea level. Krapanj is 300m offshore at its closest point from the mainland town of Brodarica.

The island is divided into the precincts: Donja Loza, Gornja Loza, Pisak, Donje More, Sika, Dolac and Buta. In close vicinity are the uninhabited islets of Mumonja, Oblik, Krbela mala, Krbela vela and the Oštrica peninsula, located to the south. Krapanj is administratively located in the City of Šibenik and is one of its local committees.

== Geography ==
The average elevation is about 2 metres (6 feet 7 inches) and the highest point is 7 metres (23 feet) above sea level. It lies in the Dinaric direction, from north-west to south-east.

=== Geology ===
Krapanj is composed of Mesozoic limestone and dolomite.

=== Climate ===
The island of Krapanj is situated in the central part of the Croatian littoral and is characterised by a warm, dry Mediterranean climate. According to data from the nearest weather station, in Šibenik, for the period from 1986 to 1996 the average annual temperature was 15.5 °C (60 °F) and the average annual precipitation 711.7 mm (28.02 in).

== History ==
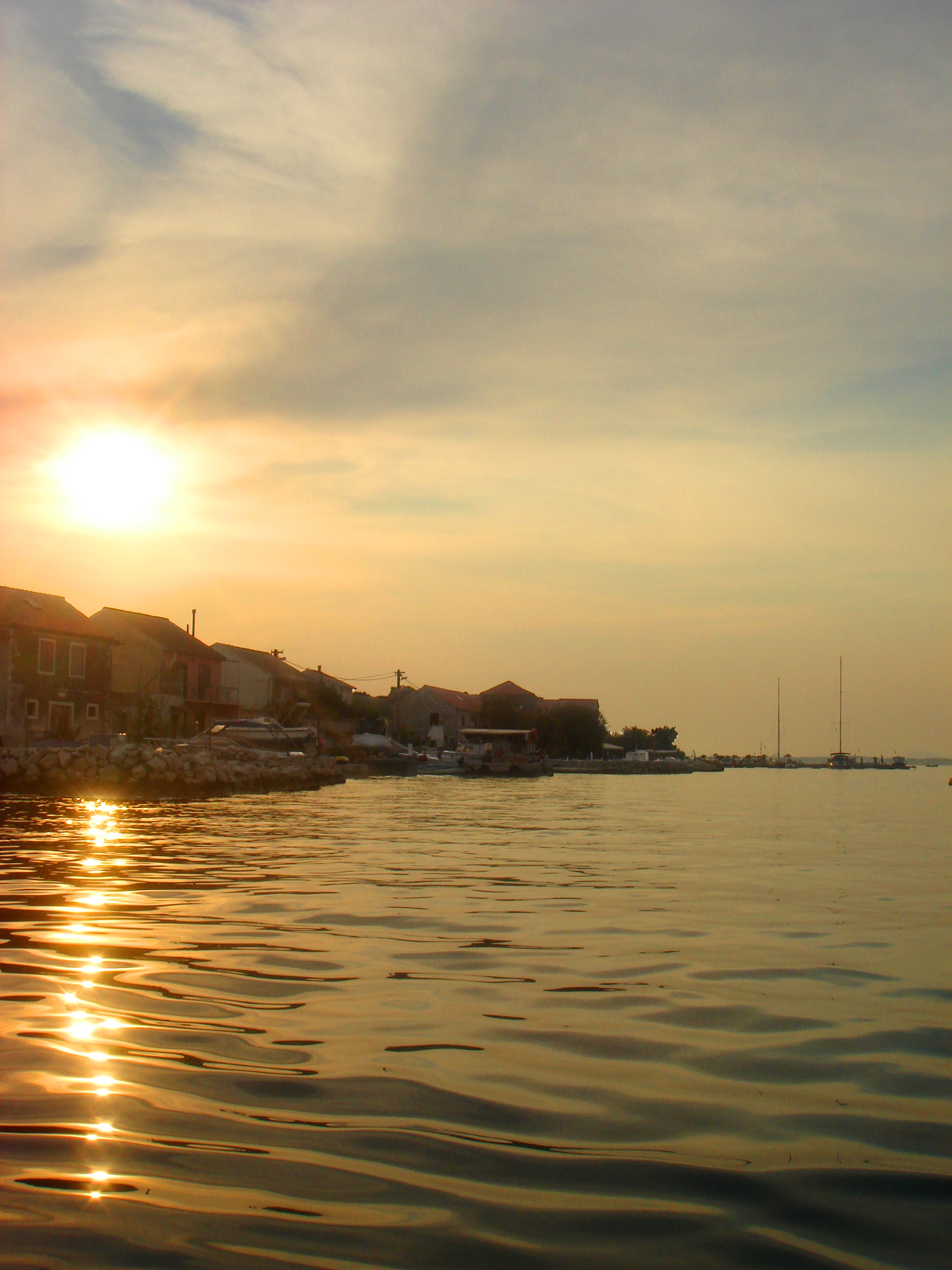
Krapanj

Many of the Adriatic Islands were populated in pre-history by the Illyrians. Krapanj however was first populated by Croatian Toma Jurić, a nobleman from Šibenik and a descendant of the Šubić family from Bribir. Jurić purchased the island in 1436 from the Šibenik County with the intention of building a Franciscan church on the uninhabited island. Realising their father's dream after his death, Jurić's 4 sons completed The Holy Cross Church and monastery in 1523 with blessings from Pope Eugene IV on one condition: only the Friars were to live and inhabit Krapanj.

Krapanj came under the possession of the Franciscan Province of St. Jerome of Dalmatia in the 16th century as the Ottoman Empire invaded neighbouring lands. The Franciscans allowed people living on the neighbouring mainland to build their own settlement, southeast of the monastery who then united to defend themselves against the Ottomans.

Since the work of the Franciscan friars was closely connected to the inhabitants of the island, in 1652, the monastery was given a parish and the friars began offering spiritual and other assistance to parishes on the mainland. The remains of the old church walls, in part, can be seen by the front door of the cloister. The church was expanded in 1937, and the wall bearing the consecration date (May 15, 1523) joins the new church building with the cloister.

Krapanj was the most densely populated of all Croatian Islands given a lucrative economy. But from the middle to late 20th century, many inhabitants fled communism and poverty by emigrating to Australia, Canada and the United States. Adding to the trend of depopulation, the population decreased from 1,767 in 1981 to only 170 in 2011.

== Art and culture ==
The island of Krapanj's culture and traditions reflect the Dalmatian way of life. Hard work, good food and a healthy lifestyle embodies the seaside rock houses and tiny side-streets. Krapanj takes pride in its origins of deep sea diving and generally personifies a seafaring culture.

Krapanj's tourist industry is vastly underdeveloped, with the main factor being the prohibition of vehicles on the island. As a result, the island has kept many of the old-world traditions that add a unique charm.

The art of producing wine (vino), olive oil (maslinovo ulje), rakija and sea sponge (spužve) are traditions that date back to pre-history but are still extremely evident in modern-day Krapanj. Food is generally seafood, caught by local fisherman and distributed locally.

Krapanj holds a host of cultural antiquities in the monastery including "The Last Supper" by the 16th-century Italian artist Francesco da Santa Croce and a Renaissance painting titled "The Black Madonna On The Throne".

The biggest event on the island's calendar is the annual Krapljanska Fešta. The day-long festival is held on 2 August and celebrates Gospe od Anđela ("Our Lady of the Angels"). Thousands of people gather on the island for the cultural feast of good food, good wine and centuries of culture. The locals annually proclaim "a night the island almost sank".

=== Cuisine ===
Krapanj's island culture has spread throughout the region as many inhabitants now live in mainland Brodarica. Traditionally fish, clams and octopus are either grilled over dried vine leaves or cooked in a wood-fired oven. The signature dishes of the region are Squid Ink Risotto, Octopus Potato Salad and Grilled Fish.

== Economy ==
=== Deep sea diving ===
Sea sponge from Krapanj

Krapanj has a rich history in underwater diving, primarily in the harvesting and selling of sea sponges. Franciscan Antun from Crete, who came to serve in local monastery, introduced Krapanj's inhabitants to diving and sea sponge gathering/processing at the end of the 17th century. For many years, diving for sponges had been the major income for Krapanj families, earning them the title of "Spužvari" (sponge vendors).

By the middle of the 20th century, the industry peaked with the inception of breathing apparatus and motorised boats. Crews would generally dive 6 times a day, over 20 days taking turns one at a time at depths of over 40 metres (131 feet). It was a dangerous occupation as just the weight of the suit was 100 kg (220 lb) and the constant danger of decompression sickness discouraged generations to come.

The small industry still persists, with sponges from Krapanj sold throughout Europe with a primary market in Greece and Italy. The cosmetic market has in recent years opened the market for Krapanj sponges on an international scale.

The tradition of diving has in latter days given rise to scuba diving, free diving and spearfishing professionals from Krapanj.

The Krapanj monastery museum permanently exhibits a show on sea sponge diving.

=== Tourism ===
Many of Krapanj's old terraces have either been restored or are in the process of being rebuilt under strict heritage by-laws. This has started a steady stream of tourists to the island which now supports a certain level of tourism infrastructure.

Many other Adriatic Islands have constructed bridges to allow tourist access by car. Krapanj has made the decision not to connect to the mainland as this would destroy the island's heritage.

== Demographics ==
According to the 2011 census, Krapanj had a population of 170.

In 2021, its population was 166.

Krapanj: Population trends 1857–2021
v

population	622	1121	800	779	995	1122	1360	1471	1364	1400	1247	1067	263	362	237	170	166
	1857	1869	1880	1890	1900	1910	1921	1931	1948	1953	1961	1971	1981	1991	2001	2011	2021

Sources: Croatian Bureau of Statistics publications

Although the island is sparsely populated, many of its residents have relocated to the mainland in nearby Brodarica. Combined, both Krapanj and Brodarica are strongly developing tourism areas with the entire area having more than 3,500 residents.

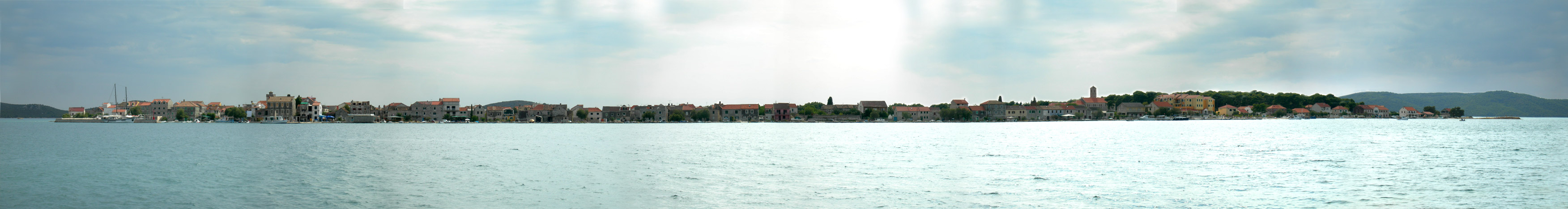
Krapanj panorama from the mainland

== Gallery ==
Krapanj women rowing a Gajeta

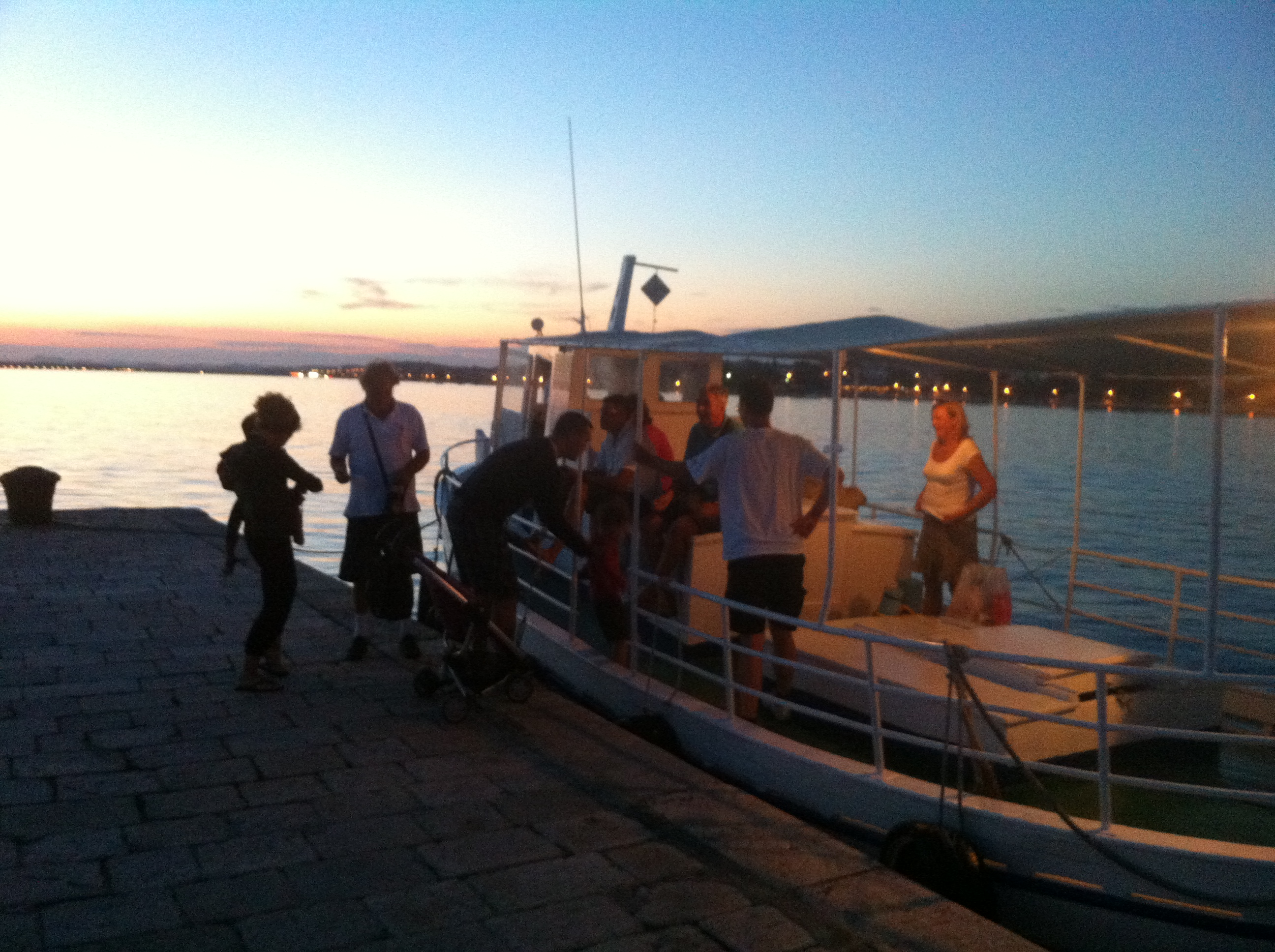
Krapanj's ferry at sunset

The old school

Terraced architecture

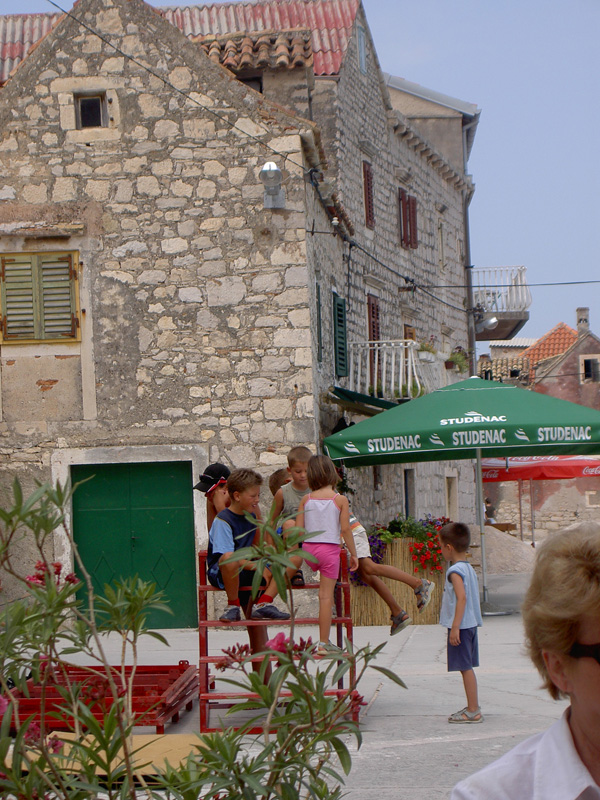
Summer on Krapanj

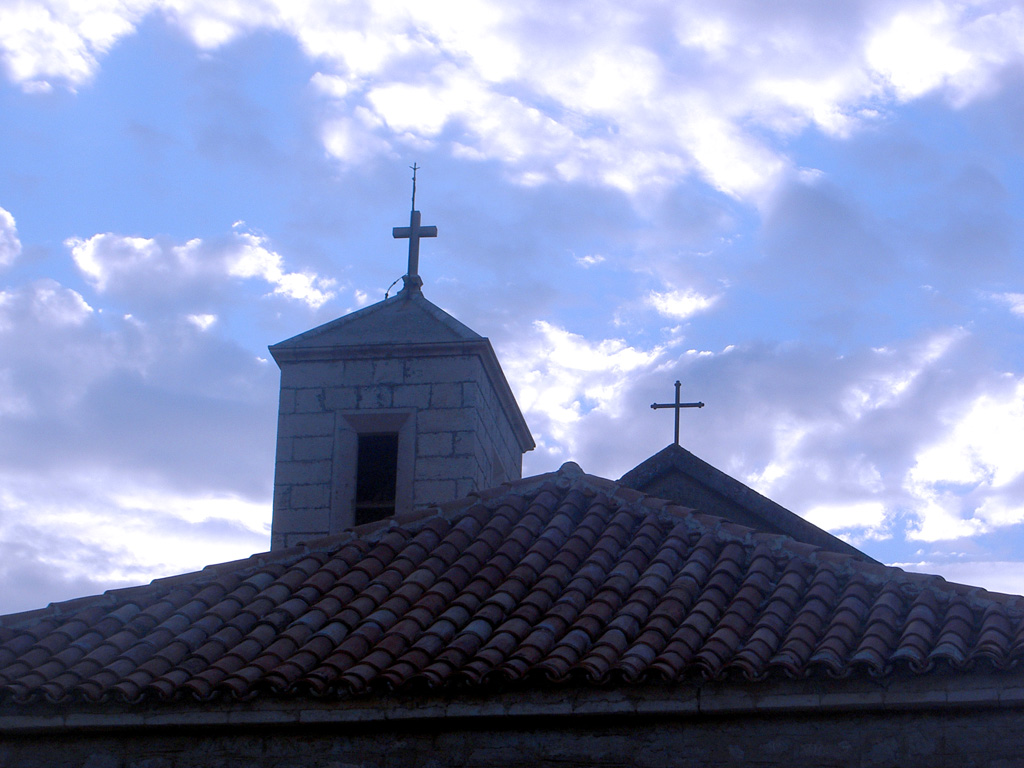
Capella from The Holy Cross Monastery

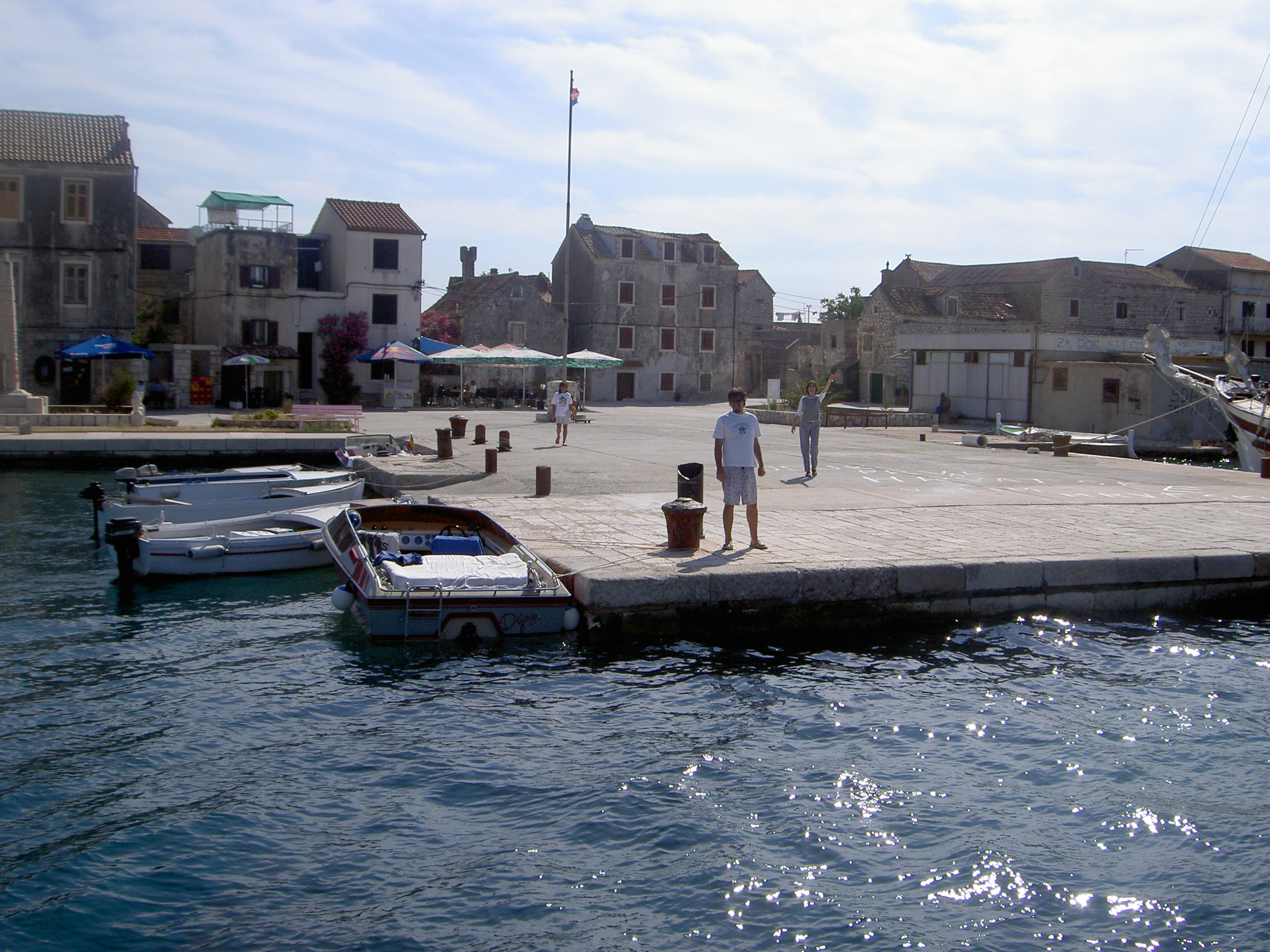
Krapanj's boat dock

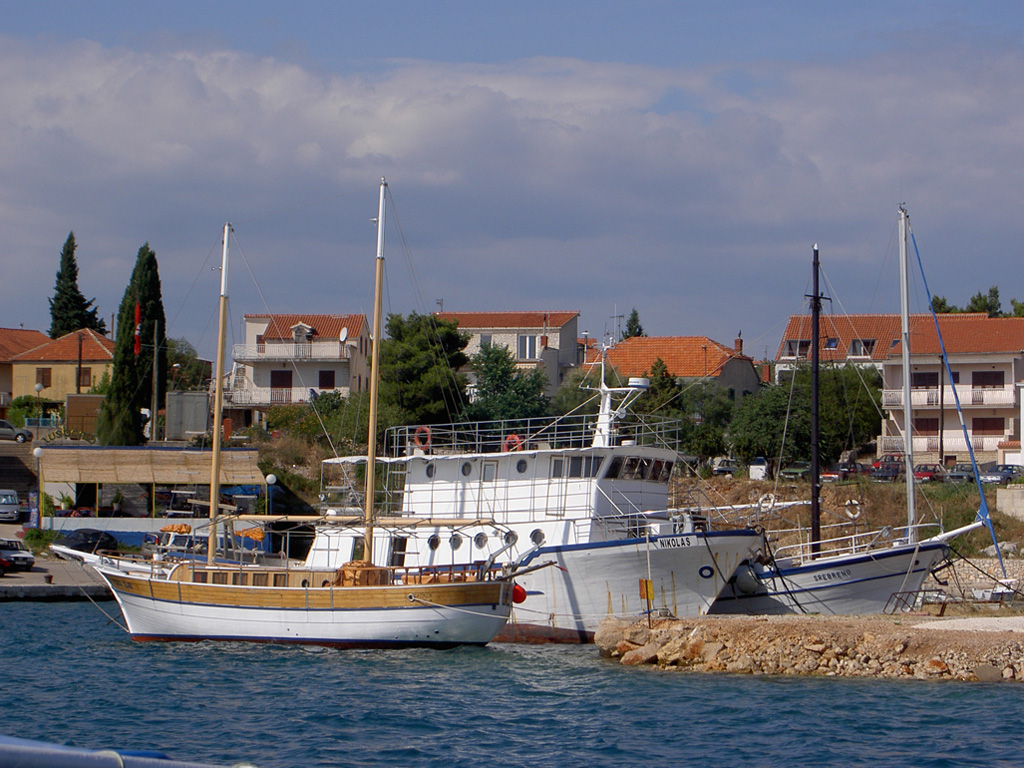
Boats moored in Brodarica

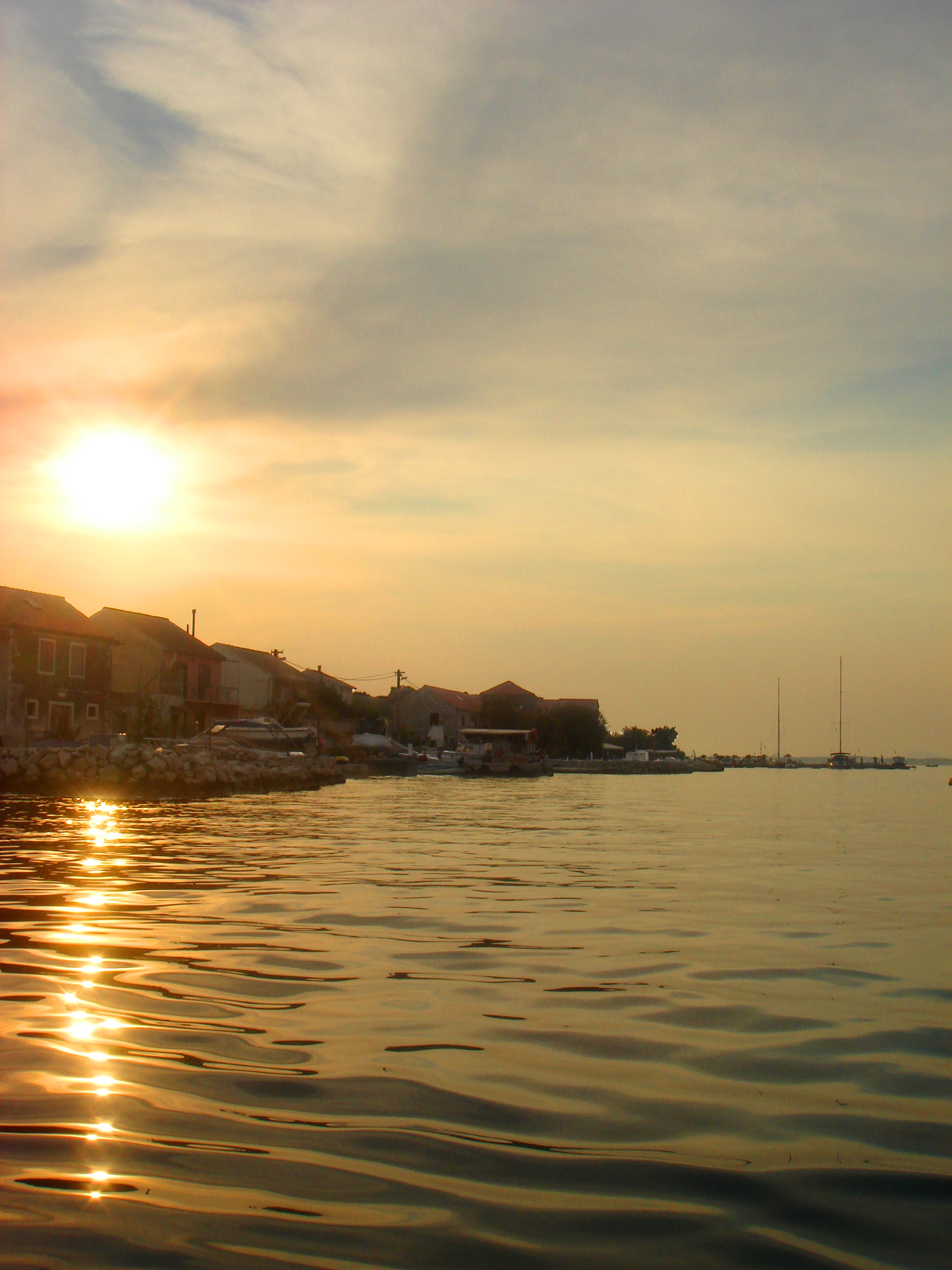
Sunset in Krapanj

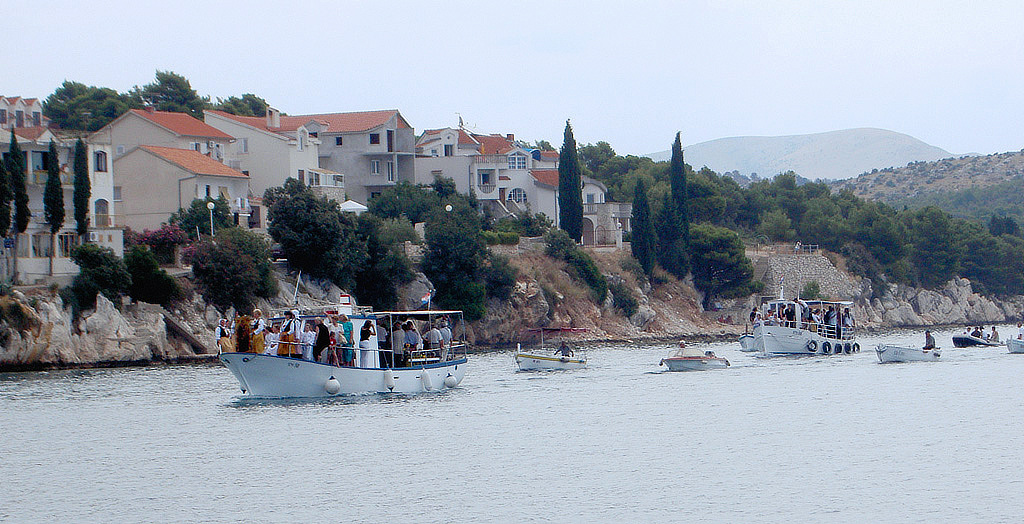
Procession of boats for the Krapljanska Fešta

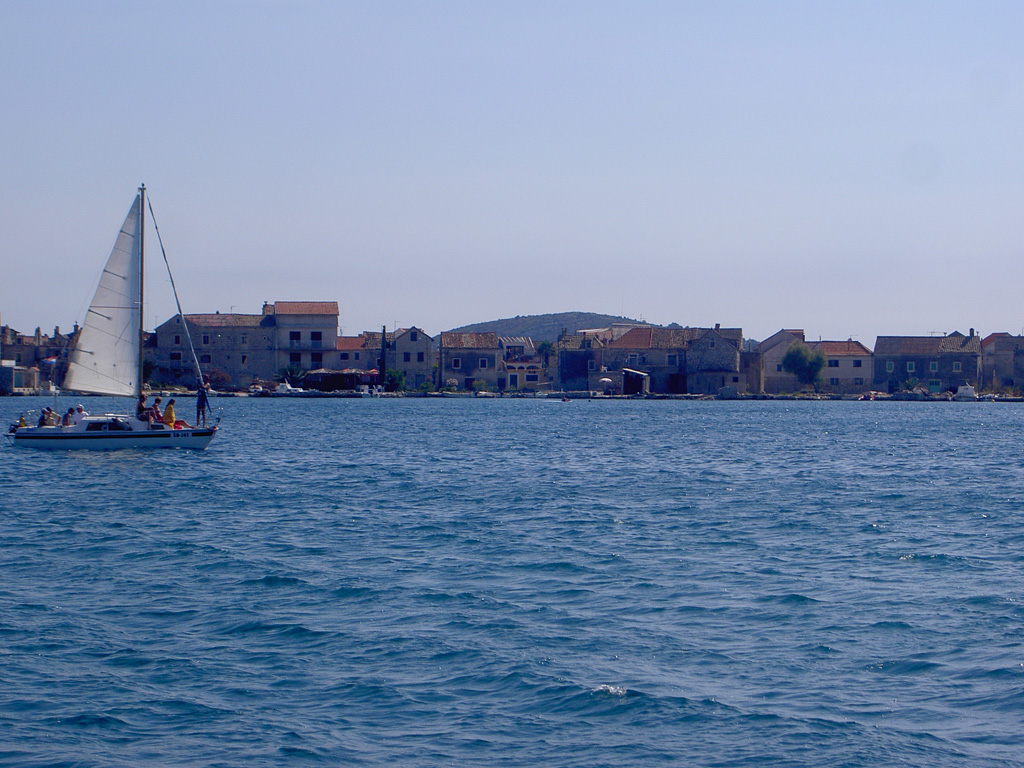
A view of Krapanj from Brodarica

== See also ==
- Brodarica
- Šibenik
- Zlarin
- Dalmatia
- Adriatic Sea
- Croatia
