= Brodarica, Šibenik =

Coastal village in Dalmatia, Croatia

Brodarica
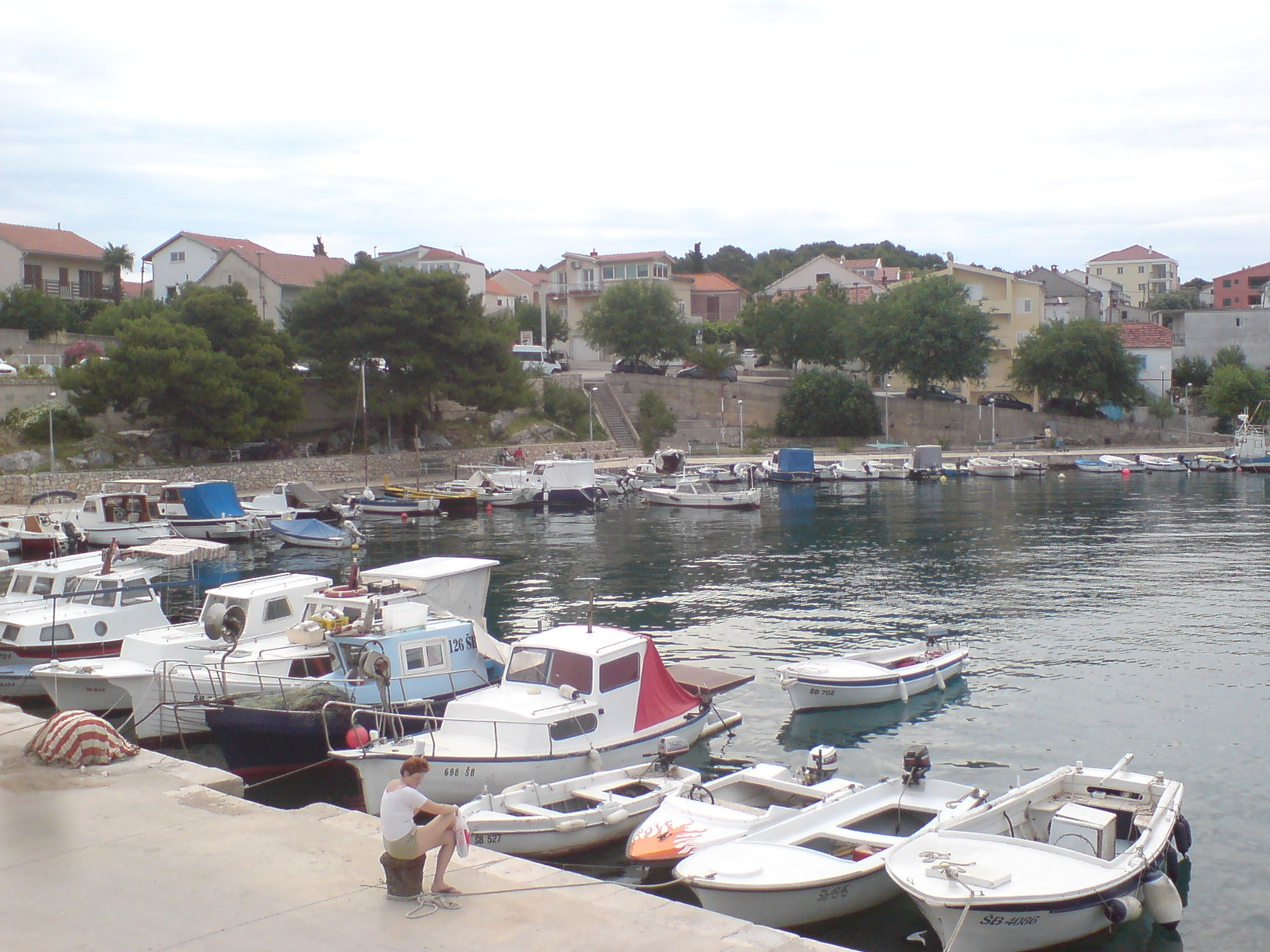

- Location within Croatia
- Coordinates: 43°40′50″N 15°55′03″E
- Country: Croatia
- County: Šibenik-Knin
- City: Šibenik

Area
  - Total: 6.1 km^{2} (2.4 sq mi)

Population (2021)
  - Total: 2,611
  - Density: 430/km^{2} (1,100/sq mi)
- Time zone: UTC+1 (CET)
  - Summer (DST): UTC+2 (CEST)

Brodarica is a village located 8 km south of Šibenik, Croatia. It is located on the Adriatic Sea coast, across the island of Krapanj and west of the bay of Morinje, by the D8 state road. The population is 2,534 (census 2011).

== Notable residents ==
- Velimir Škorpik

== Image gallery ==
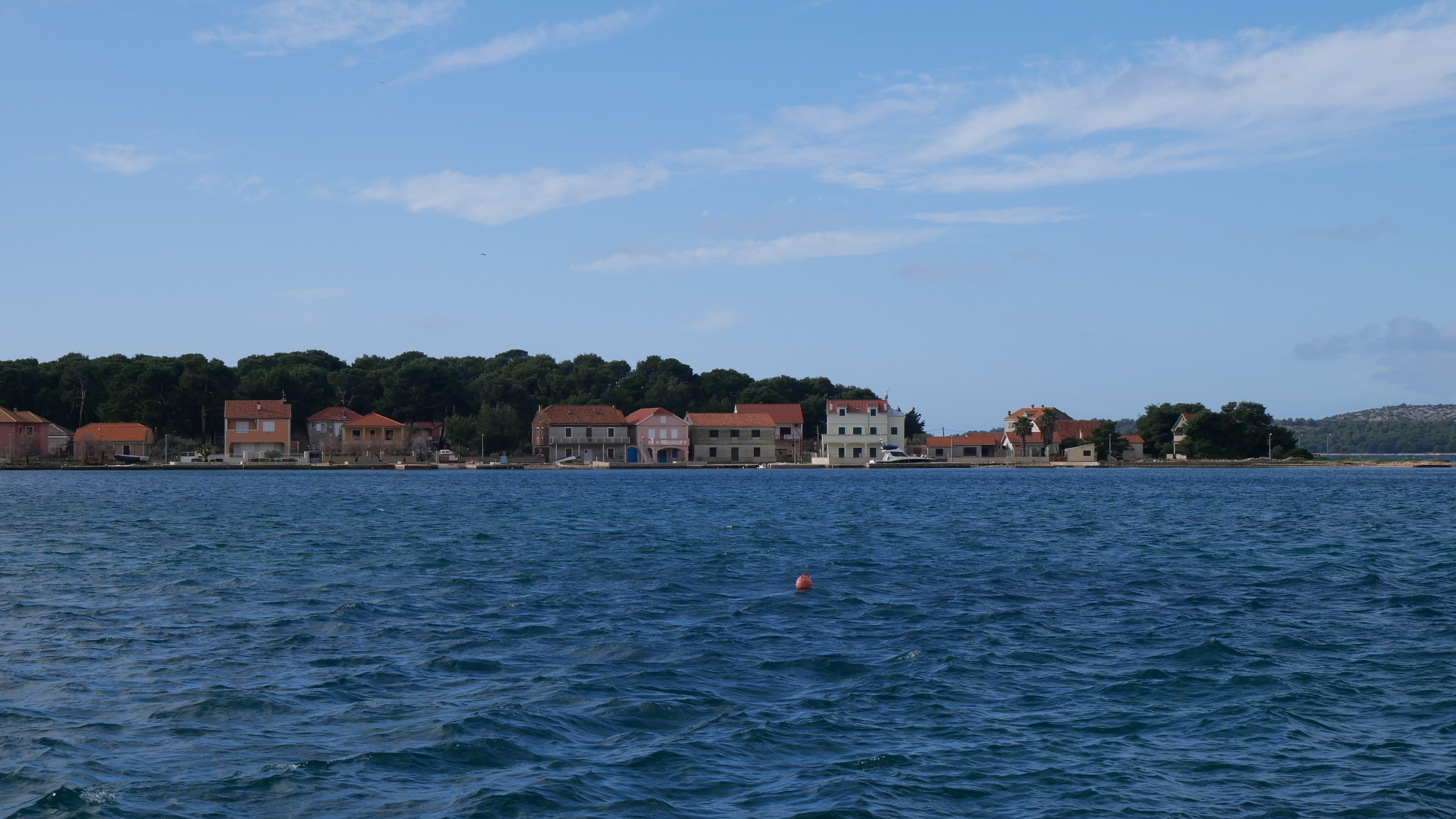
View of Krapanj from Brodarica coast

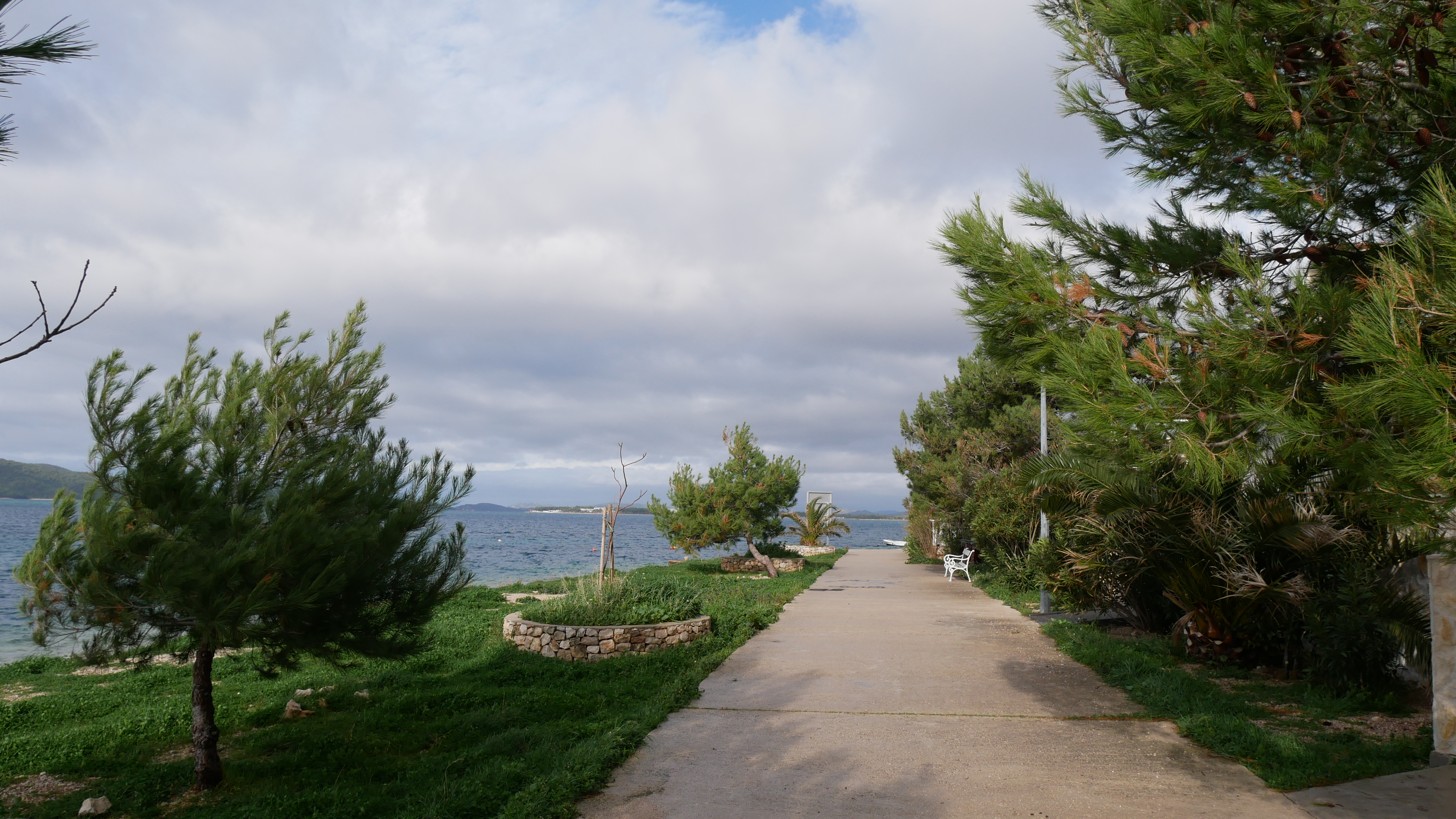
Brodarica promenade

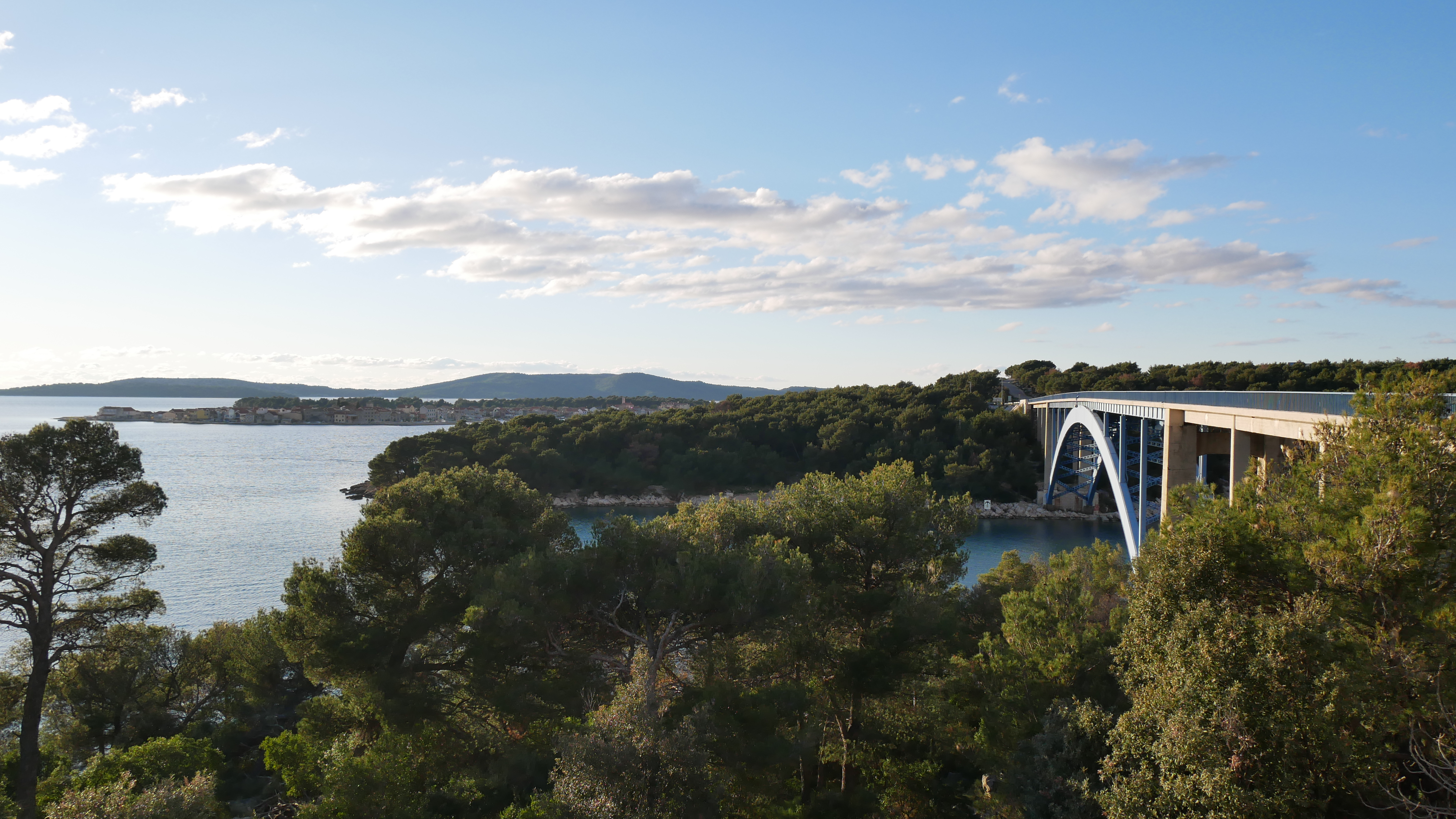
Brodarica bridge connecting Brodarica to Šibenik

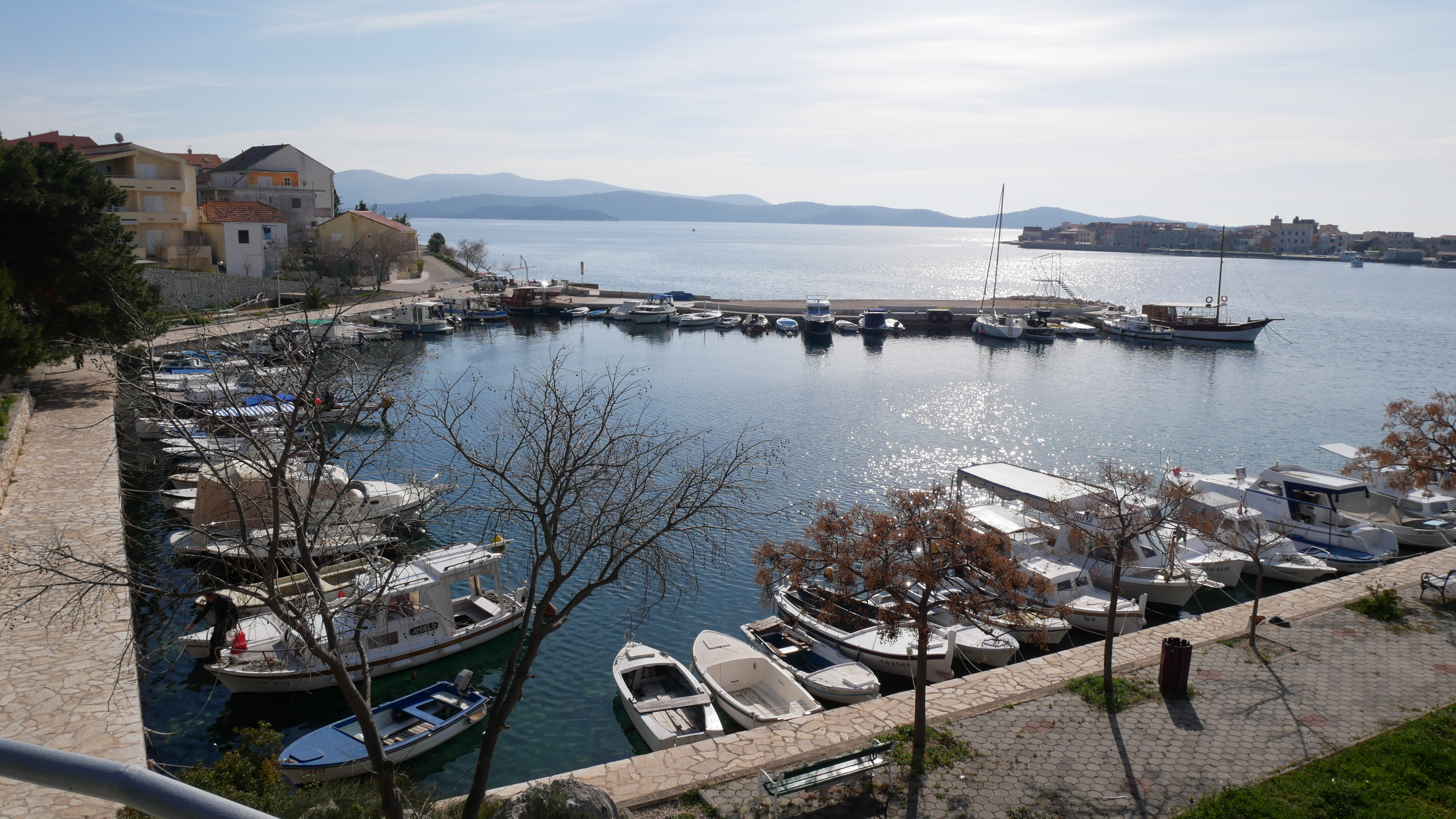
Brodarica coast
