= Petrovo Polje (Croatia) =

Polje (karst field) in Dalmatia, Croatia

Petrovo polje
- Petrovo field
- Location within Croatia
- Floor elevation: 260 to 330 m (850 to 1,080 ft)
- Length: 17 km (11 mi) NW-SE
- Width: 7 km (4.3 mi)
- Area: 57 km^{2} (22 mi^{2})

Geology
- Type: Polje

Geography
- Country: Croatia
- State/Province: Zagora
- District: Šibenik-Knin County
- Borders on: Dinara; Svilaja; Promina; Moseć
- Coordinates: 43.85°N 16.21°E
- River: Čikola

Location
- Interactive map of Petrovo polje

The Petrovo Polje (Croatian: Petrovo polje, "Peter's Field") is a polje (karstic field) in the northern part of Dalmatian Hinterland in Croatia. The Čikola river is the main watercourse in the polje.

== Geography ==
Petrovo Polje is the shape of an isosceles triangle 17 kilometres (11 mi) long and 7 kilometres (4.3 mi) wide, and is surrounded by mountains Svilaja, Promina and Moseć. It slopes from the north-east at 320 m.a.s.l. to its south-western end at 265 m.a.s.l. Its area is 57 km^{2} (22 sq mi).

== Climate ==
The climate of Petrovo Polje has the elements of both the cooler and harsher continental climate of the north and the warmer climate predominant in the south. In the winter, jugo and bora winds are common. The average number of frost days per year is 30, between October and April. Summers are dry.

== Settlements ==
The settlements are situated on the edge of the field: Drniš, Kričke, Ružić, Umljanović, Kljake, Čavoglave, Gradac, Otavice, Kanjane, Parčić, Miočić, Biočić, Tepljuh, Siverić, Badanj. Kadina Glavica is located on the hill with the same name, while Baljci and Mirlović Polje are located above the field, on the slopes of Svilaja.

== History and culture ==
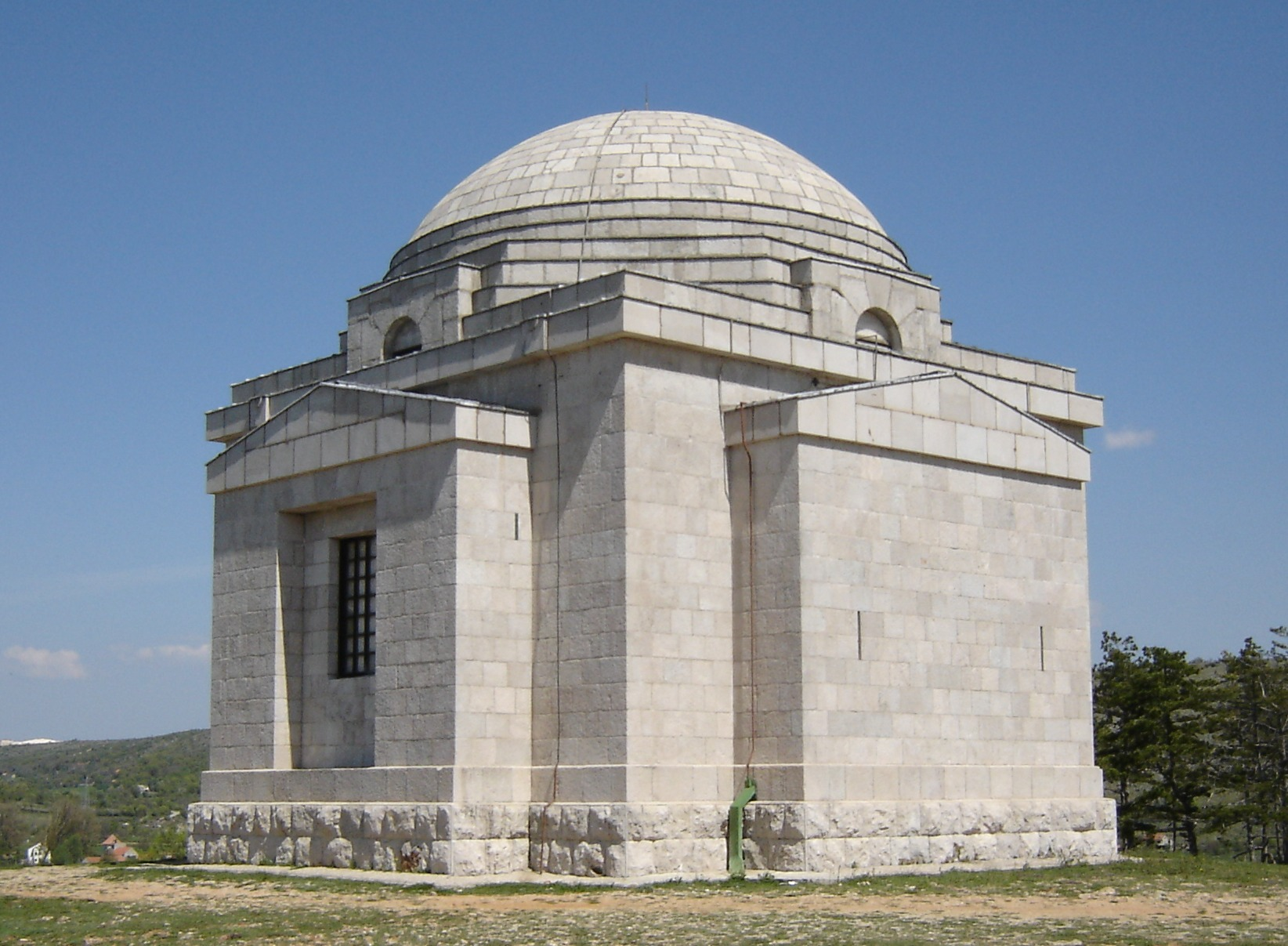
Meštrović family mausoleum in Otavice

In the antiquity, Petrovo Polje was known under the name of Campus Illyricum. Its present-day name, first mentioned in the 11th century, is believed to refer to Petar Snačić (or Svačić), the last Croatian king, and his Petrovac castle which he built in the Petrovo Polje's northern edge.

In Otavice, a small village on the edge of Petrovo Polje, there is a Church of the Most Holy Redeemer, which is also the Meštrović family mausoleum, built by the famous Croatian sculptor Ivan Meštrović between 1926 and 1930.

== See also ==
- Ravni Kotari

== Bibliography ==
- Aralica, Mile (2008). "Petropoljska raskršća" [The crossroads of Petropolje] (PDF). Titius (in Croatian). 1 (1): 317–328.
