= Čavoglave =

- Village
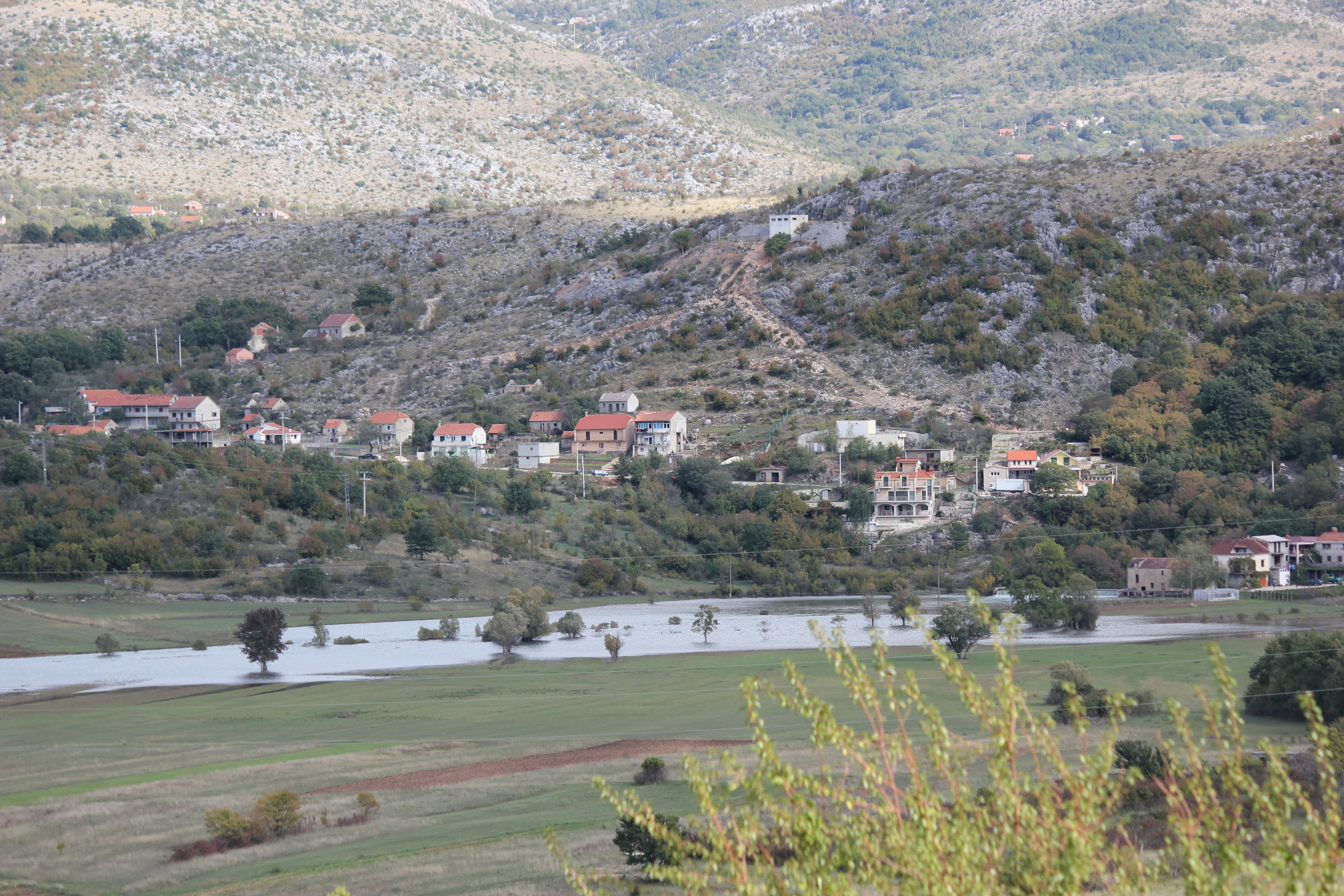

- Location within Croatia
- Coordinates: 43°47′01″N 16°20′14″E
- Country: Croatia
- County: Šibenik-Knin County
- Municipality: Ružić

Area
  - Total: 21.7 km^{2} (8.4 sq mi)
- Elevation: 420 m (1,380 ft)

Population (2021)
  - Total: 147
  - Density: 6.77/km^{2} (17.5/sq mi)
- Time zone: UTC+1 (CET)
  - Summer (DST): UTC+2 (CEST)
- Postal code: 22322 Ružić

Čavoglave is a village in Dalmatian Hinterland, Croatia with a population of 190. It is part of the Ružić municipality of the Šibenik-Knin County, in the region of Dalmatia. It is located between the mountains Svilaja and Moseć, next to the spring of the Čikola river. The southern edge of the village passes the D56 highway.

Although the village is not usually a tourist destination, the village has started to gain popularity due to the famous Croatian nationalist folk rock song "Bojna Čavoglave".

== Population ==
According to the data on the official website of the municipality, Čavoglave has 191 inhabitants.

== History ==
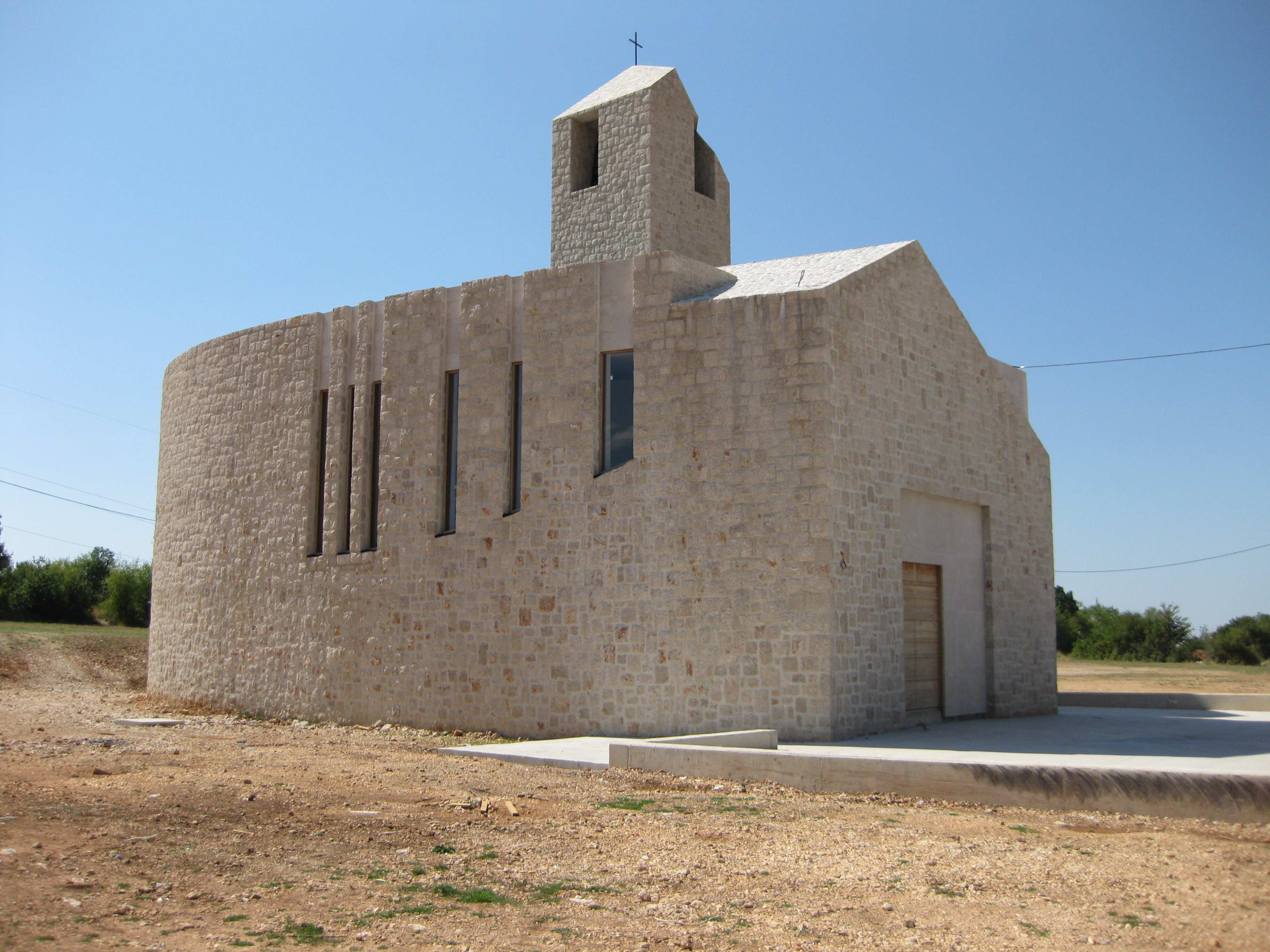
Church of Croatian Martyrs

During the Croatian War of Independence in 1991, Čavoglave was on the very front line, but they were never occupied in the 1991 Yugoslav campaign in Croatia. A large number of locals took part in the fight against Krajina Serbs. Čavoglave was popularized by Marko Perković Thompson's song "Bojna Čavoglave". The village is also Thompson's birthplace, and on his initiative, the Church of Croatian Martyrs was built there. There is an annual fund raising concert in honor of Victory and Homeland Thanksgiving Day in Čavoglave.

On 26 March 2022 at 12:17 the ŽVOC Šibenik received a call about a wildfire in the area. 40 hectares (99 acres) burned by the time it was localised at 18:07 and put out at 6:05 on the 27th by JVP Drniš, JVP Knin, IVP Šibenik, DVD Unešić and DVD Drniš with the help of a Canadair CL-415.

== Notable people ==
- Marko Perković (born 1966), Croatian musician.
- Ante Dabro (born 1938), Australian painter originally from Čavoglave.
