= Phoxinellus dalmaticus =

Conservation status
- Endangered (IUCN 3.1)

Scientific classification
- Kingdom: Animalia
- Phylum: Chordata
- Class: Actinopterygii
- Division: Teleostei
- Order: Cypriniformes
- Family: Leuciscidae
- Subfamily: Leuciscinae
- Genus: Phoxinellus
- Species: P. dalmaticus

Binomial name
- Phoxinellus dalmaticus Zupančič & Bogutskaya, 2000

Species of fish

Phoxinellus dalmaticus, the Dalmatian minnow or Cikola minnow, is a species of freshwater ray-finned fish belonging to the family Leuciscidae, which includes the daces, Eurasian minnows and related species. This species is found in Southeastern Europe, in the Western Balkans, where it is endemic to southern Croatia.

== Taxonomy ==
Phoxinellus dalmaticus was first formally described in 2000 by Primož Zupančič and Bogutskaya with its type locality given as the Čikola River at Kljake in Croatia. The genus Phoxineluus is classified within the subfamily Leuciscinae of the family Leuciscidae.

== Etymology ==
Phoxinellus dalmaticus is classified in the genus Phoxinellus, this name is a diminutive of Phoxinus, the genus of the "true" Eurasian minnows. It is thought that Heckel may have coined this name due to the small size of P. alepidotus when compared to Cyprinus phoxinus. The specific name, dalmaticus, means "of Dalmatia", the region of southern Croatia where this species is endemic.

== Description ==
Phoxinellus dalmaticus has a naked body with the only scales being in the relatively, short, sometimes broken lateral line which has between 18 and 44 scales, these are both pored and unpored. It has a low count of 37 or 38 vertebrae. 21 abdominal vertebrae iand 16 or 17 caudal vertebrae. The caudal fin has a shallow fork with clearly rounded lobes. This species has a maximum standard length of 6 cm (2.4 in).

== Distribution and habitat ==
Phoxinellus dalmaticus is endemic to southern Croatia where it only occurs in the Čikola River, a tributary of the Krka River located in the central part of the Dinaric Karst region of Dalmatian Zagora in Croatia.This species has been observed in the main stems of the Čikola and its tributary the Vrba rivers as well as the associated marginal wetlands, spring-fed streams and artificial drainage ditches. In dry periods some individuals take refuge in permanent pools, aggregate near springs or retreat to subterranean water bodies via ponors. The Dalmatian minnow has been recorded inside the caves from which the source spring of the Čikola emerges throughout the year.

== Conservation ==
Phoxinellus dalmaticus is classified as Endangered by the International Union for Conservation of Nature. It has a restricted range and its habitat is being degraded by many anthropogenic factors including pollution, damming, water abstraction and non-native invasive species.
