= Čvrljevo, Šibenik =

Settlement in Šibenik-Knin County, Croatia

Čvrljevo
- Settlement
- Interactive map of Čvrljevo
- Location of Čvrljevo in Croatia
- Coordinates: 43°45′35″N 16°01′13″E
- Country: Croatia
- County: Šibenik-Knin
- City: Šibenik

Area
  - Total: 4.9 km^{2} (1.9 sq mi)

Population (2021)
  - Total: 51
  - Density: 10/km^{2} (27/sq mi)
- Time zone: UTC+1 (CET)
  - Summer (DST): UTC+2 (CEST)
- Postal code: 22323 Unešić
- Area code: +385 (0)22

Čvrljevo is a settlement in the City of Šibenik in Croatia. In 2021, its population was 51.

== Demographics ==
Čvrljevo: Population trends 1857–2021
v

population			106	132	170	245	282	272	295	331	329	273	194	156	87	64	51
	1857	1869	1880	1890	1900	1910	1921	1931	1948	1953	1961	1971	1981	1991	2001	2011	2021

Sources: Croatian Bureau of Statistics publications
