= Toma Rosandić =

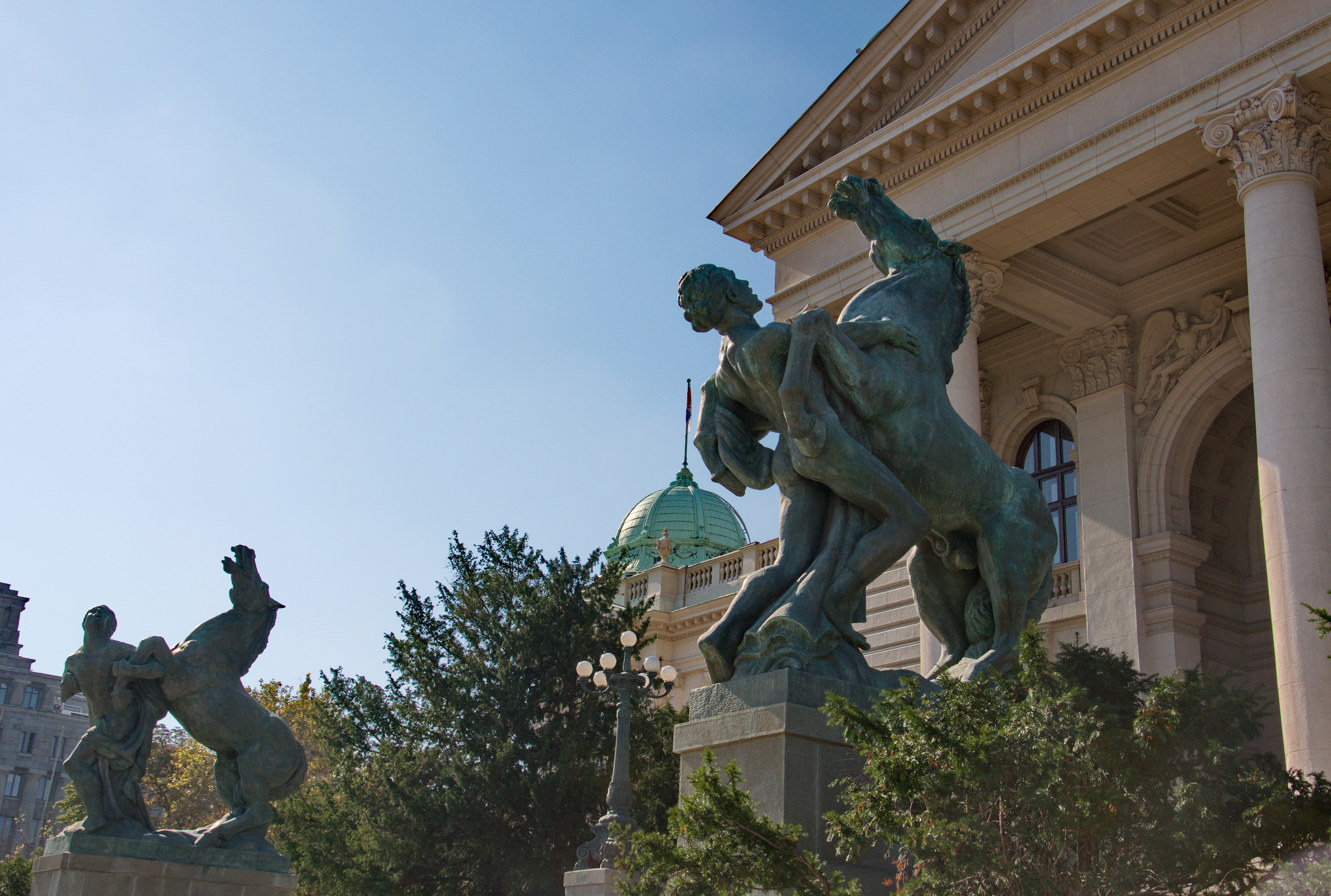
Play of the Black Horses (1938) in front of the House of the National Assembly of Serbia

Toma Rosandić (Serbian Cyrillic: Тома Росандић; baptized as Tomaso Vincenzo, 22 January 1878 – 1 March 1958) was a Croatian, Serbian and Yugoslav sculptor, architect and fine arts pedagogue. Together with Ivan Meštrović (1883–1962), Frano Kršinić and Antun Augustinčić, he was the most prominent of Croatian and Yugoslav sculptors of his day.

== Biography ==
Rosandić was born to a Serbian orthodox family in the Dalmatian city of Split, Kingdom of Dalmatia, Austria-Hungary, the son of a stoneworker. The family name, Rosandić originates from Cetinska Krajina, in the Dalmatian Hinterlands. During the early years in Split, Rosandić learnt to carve in wood as well as stone and was much inspired by the younger Meštrović who had moved there from Otavice. Both sculptors studied overseas before returning to Split, Rosandić touring Italy and exhibiting in Milan in 1906 and Belgrade in 1912.

He exhibited his artworks as a part of Kingdom of Serbia's pavilion at International Exhibition of Art of 1911.

Something of their parallel development and underlying rivalry can be understood from their respective projects to combine sculpture and architecture. Both constructed a mausoleum, Rosandić for the Petrinović family (Supetar, on the island of Brač off Split) and Meštrović to the Račić family (Cavtat, south of Dubrovnik). Each exhibit the influence of Dalmatian history, but while Meštrović's mausoleum is based on the principle of simplicity, Rosandić richly ornamented his building with a blend of Gothic and Renaissance motifs to express a more national character.

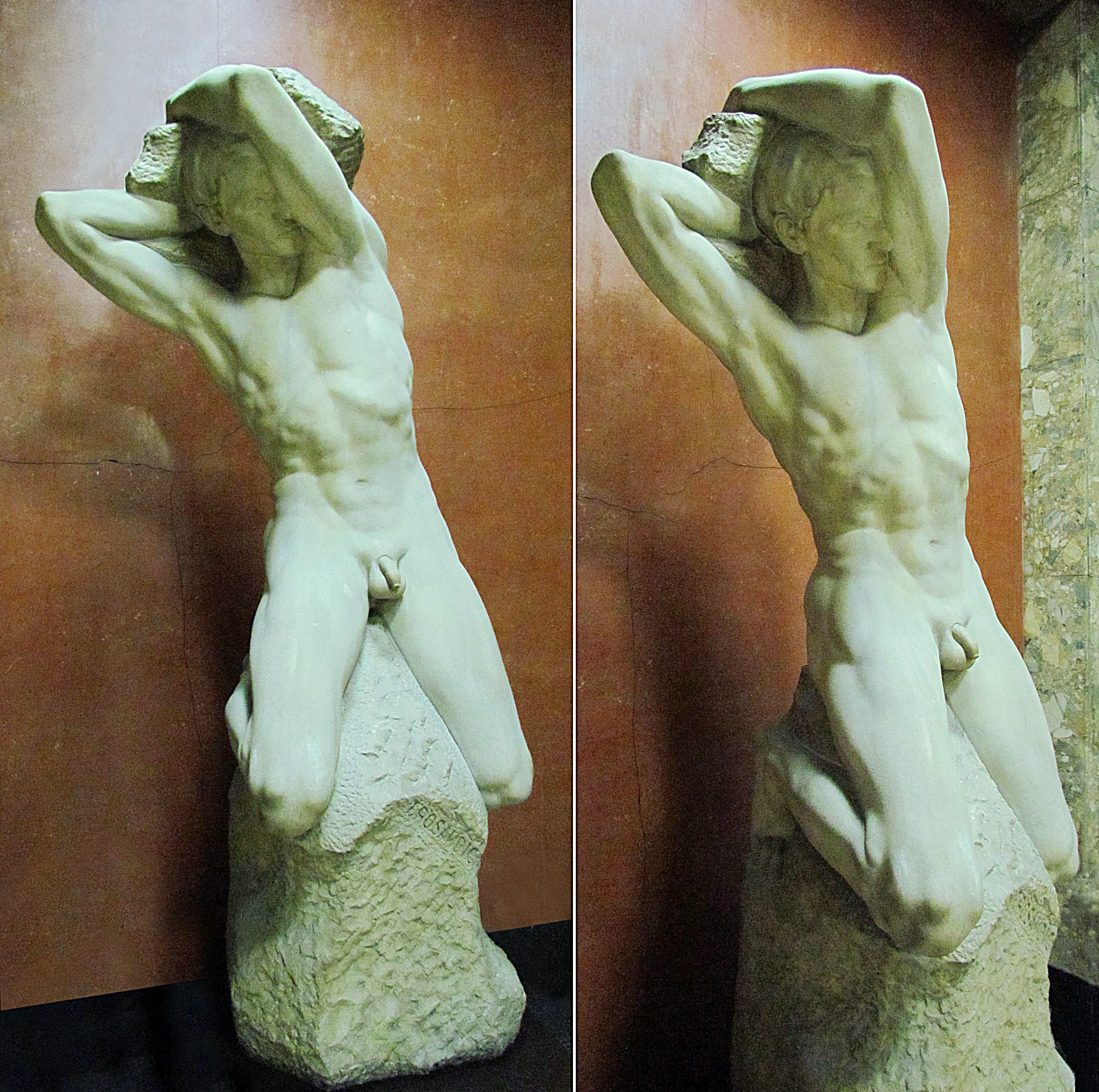
Statue of Stone Thrower (1935), National Museum of Serbia

With the outbreak of World War I, Rosandić left for London where he exhibited at the Grafton Galleries in 1917 and later in Brighton and Edinburgh. During World War II, Rosandić settled in Belgrade. He was interned by the German occupation forces during the war, but was later released through the intervention of Dragomir Jovanović. Rosandić later testified at the Belgrade Process.

Rosandić was a member of the Serbian Academy of Sciences and Arts since 1948. He founded a prominent school in Belgrade known as the "Master Workshop". Amongst the many artists and public personalities that frequented the workshop was Henry Moore, during his exhibition in Belgrade in March 1955.

In his maturity, Rosandić executed two of his greatest masterpieces: the pair of stone statues of a man struggling with a horse, which flank the entrance to the Serbian National Assembly building in Belgrade, and a massive stone frieze of figures for a monument in Subotica, Serbia (1952). Many of his bronze projects at this time were cast in the Voždovac foundry and other works by his hand can be found at the Toma Rosandić Memorial Museum and the Museum of Contemporary Art, Belgrade.

Rosandić returned to Split before his death in 1958.
