= Drniš =

- Town
- Grad Drniš; Town of Drniš
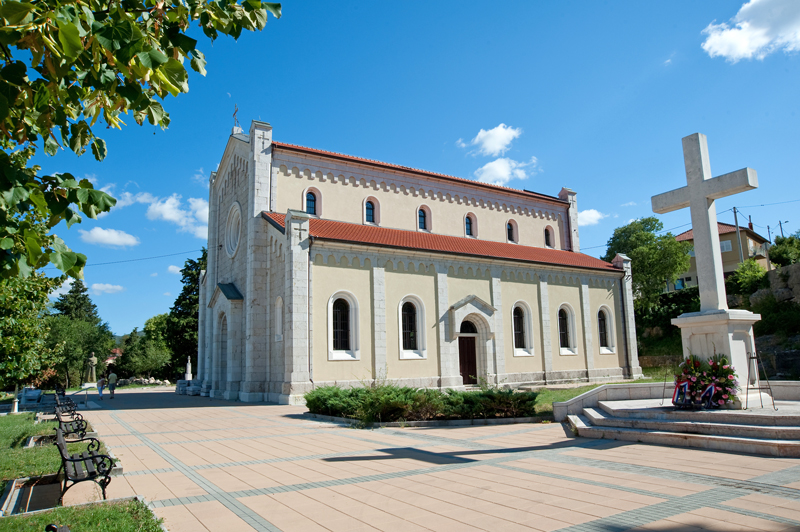
- Church in Drniš

- Location within Croatia
- Coordinates: 43°51′45″N 16°9′20″E
- Country: Croatia
- Region: Dalmatia (Dalmatian Hinterland)
- County: Šibenik-Knin County

Government
  - Mayor: Tomislav Dželalija (HDZ)

Area
  - Town: 351.7 km^{2} (135.8 sq mi)
  - Urban: 21.3 km^{2} (8.2 sq mi)

Population (2021)
  - Town: 6,276
  - Density: 17.84/km^{2} (46.22/sq mi)
  - Urban: 2,752
  - Urban density: 129/km^{2} (335/sq mi)
- Time zone: UTC+1 (CET)
  - Summer (DST): UTC+2 (CEST)
- Climate: Cfa
- Website: drnis.hr

Drniš is a town in the Šibenik-Knin County, Croatia. Located in the Dalmatian Hinterland, it is about halfway between Šibenik and Knin.

== History ==
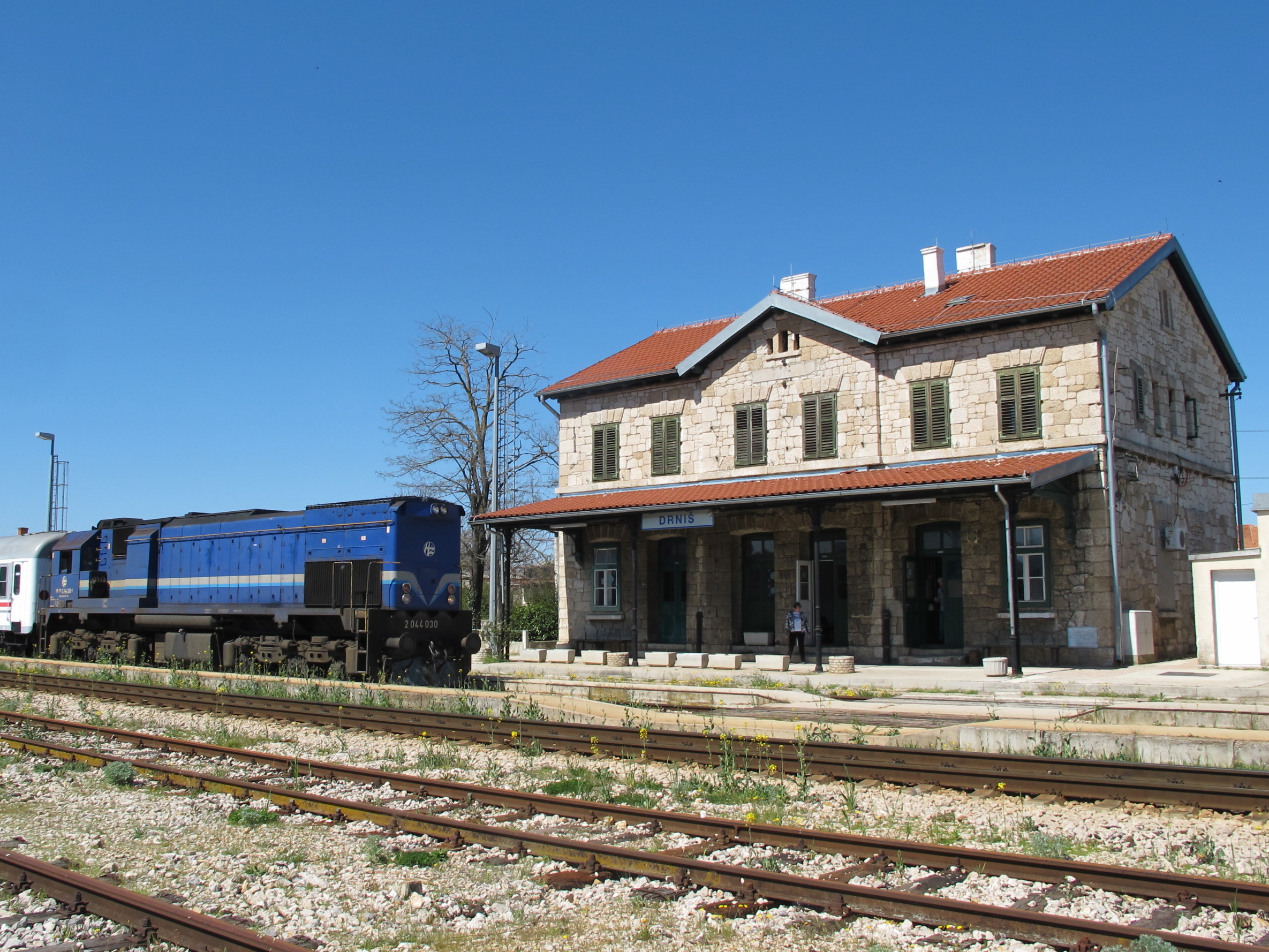
Drniš railway station

The name Drniš was mentioned for the first time in a contract dated March 8, 1494. However, there are traces of an older Middle Ages' fortress built by Croatian aristocrat family Nelipić at the site called Gradina dominating the landscape. The town was conquered by the Ottoman Turks in 1522 due to its strategic location. Many buildings from this time period are still preserved today. During the Baroque period, the mosque built by the Turks was transformed into a church. During Ottoman rule, it was nahiya seat of Petrovo Polje; which initially bounded to Croatian vilayet of Sanjak of Bosnia between 1522 and 1537, laterly to Sanjak of Kilis between 1537 and 1664 and again between 1670 and 1683. Venetian Republic briefly conquered Drniš in 1664 during Cretan War. Ottomans recaptured in 1670. Finally it fell into Venetian hands in 1683 during Great Turkish War. Then, Drniš shared fate of Venetian Dalmatia till 1918. In 1918 the town was occupied by Italian troops who remained there until a withdrawal in 1921, as a result of the Treaty of Rapallo. The town subsequently became a part of the Kingdom of Serbs, Croats and Slovenes.

=== World War II ===
In October 1941, the Minister of Sport and Mountaineering of the NDH, Miško Zebić, named Andrija Sabalić as the state povjerenik of the HPD "Risnjak", and designated as the chapter's advisory board: Tomo Pelicarić, Stipe Skelin, Marko Jukica, Ivo Jelavić, fra Petar Berković and Tomislav Franić. The HPD "Risnjak" was renamed Hrvatsko planinarsko društvo u Drnišu in March 1942.

=== Croatian War of Independence ===
Drniš was the site of a major military conflict during the Croatian War of Independence. On 16 September, the Yugoslav People's Army (JNA), with the support of local Territorial Defense units, carried out three attacks towards the city of Zadar and two smaller breakthroughs towards Šibenik and Drniš. JNA and Territorial Defense forces launched an attack with tanks, artillery and rocket launchers on the villages of Gradac, Otavice, Kadine Glave, Siverić, Lišnjak, Trbounje, Razvođe, Bogatić and other towns, with the aim of capturing them and breaking through to the outskirts of Drniš. The JNA and the Territorial Defense units quickly captured the approaches to Drniš.

On the night of September 16 to 17, 1991, a column of Croatian civilians fled to Zagora. Women, children, the elderly and the sick walked across Čikola to Pakova Selo and Pokrovnik, and further by train and bus to safer places on the coast, about 17,000 Croatian civilians fled the area. Serbian forces captured the crossroads around the village of Oklaj on 18 September. The 114th Split Brigade of the Croatian National Army could do little to counter the JNA's armored vehicles and artillery. By 21 September, JNA forces and the Territorial Defense units had captured the town of Drniš itself. JNA troops from the 22nd Regiment later attacked Croatian forces around Sinj, opening the way for the Corps' Engineering Regiment to withdraw from the barracks; the Croats allowed the withdrawal on 27 September 1991.

The town and surrounding Croatian villages suffered extensive demolition and looting in that period. In August 1995, Drniš was restored to Croatian government control during the military action Operation Storm, and much of the Serbian population fled to Serbia or Bosnia and Herzegovina.

== Climate ==
Since records began in 1957, the highest temperature recorded at the local weather station was 41.0 °C (105.8 °F), on 10 August 2017. The coldest temperature was −16.1 °C (3.0 °F), on 12 January 1985.

== Population ==
Town of Drniš: Population trends 1857–2021
v

population	11212	11653	11978	12865	14843	15606	14535	17502	18900	19382	19538	18466	15363	14733	8595	7498	6276
	1857	1869	1880	1890	1900	1910	1921	1931	1948	1953	1961	1971	1981	1991	2001	2011	2021

Sources: Croatian Bureau of Statistics publications

Population of Drniš municipality
Year of census	Croats	Serbs	Yugoslavs	Others or unknown	Total
1991	18,732 (77.50%)	4,974 (19.34%)	76 (0.32%)	387 (1.60%)	24,169
2001	7,835 (91.16%)	656 (7.63%)	-	104 (1.21%)	8,595

== Heritage ==
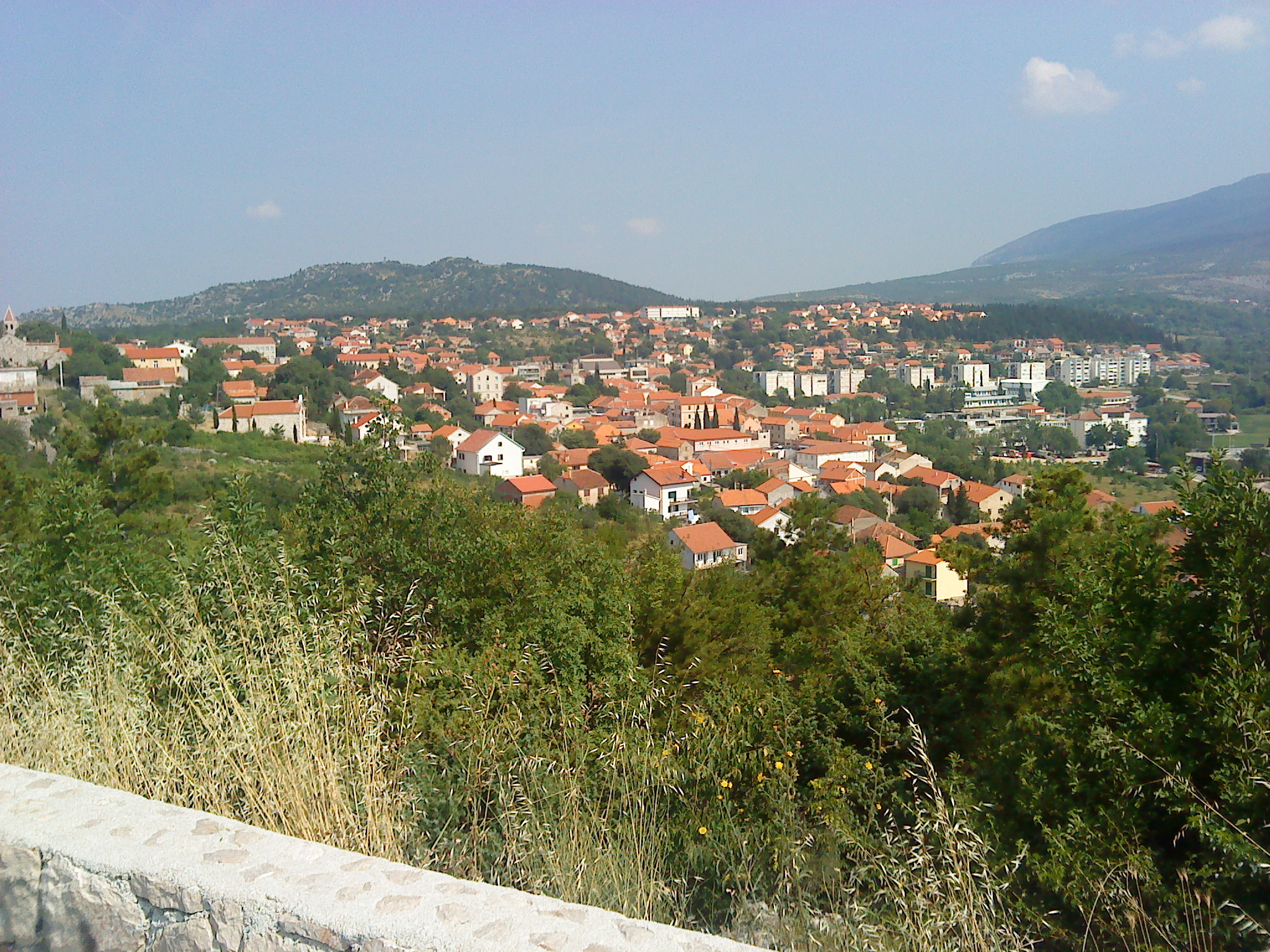
Drniš (2013)

The village of Otavice near Drniš is the place where the noted sculptor Ivan Meštrović spent his childhood. A museum has been built which has an exhibition of the archeological rests from the Neolithic and Roman eras, along with Croatian history. The composer Krsto Odak (1888–1965) was born in Siverić near Drniš. The town has a memorial to Julijan Ramljak. The area is also known for its agricultural orientation and a once notable mining center.

== Municipal settlements ==
In the 2021 census, the population was distributed in the following settlements:

- Badanj, population 233
- Biočić, population 78
- Bogatić, population 71
- Brištani, population 149
- Drinovci, population 124
- Drniš, population 2,752
- Kadina Glavica, population 150
- Kanjane, population 0
- Kaočine, population 201
- Karalić, population 119
- Ključ, population 107
- Kričke, population 185
- Lišnjak, population 4
- Miočić, population 44
- Nos Kalik, population 2
- Pakovo Selo, population 186
- Parčić, population 126
- Pokrovnik, population 190
- Radonić, population 327
- Sedramić, population 168
- Siverić, population 426
- Širitovci, population 127
- Štikovo, population 31
- Tepljuh, population 103
- Trbounje, population 181
- Velušić, population 78
- Žitnić, population 114

== Sports ==
The local chapter of the HPS, HPD "Moseć", was founded on 19 October 1938.

== Notable natives or residents ==
- Božidar Adžija, politician
- Dražen Budiša, politician
- Mihovil Nakić, basketball player
- Ecija Ojdanić, actress
- Milka Planinc, politician; Prime Minister of Yugoslavia (1982–86)
- Stojko Vranković, basketball player
- Ivan Meštrović, sculptor
- Nikanor Ivanović, Bishop of Cetinje and Metropolitan of Montenegro and the Highlands
- Đurađ Jakšić, Serbian historian and politician
- Mate Zoričić, Croatian mathematician and writer
