= Vladimir Vujović =

Vladimir Vujović may refer to:

- Michel Auclair (b. Vladimir Vujović 1922–1988) Serbian-French actor
- Vladimir Vujović (footballer, born 1982) Montenegrin footballer
- Vladimir Vujović (footballer, born 1985) Serbian footballer

== See also ==
- Vujović
