= Tepljuh =

Settlement in Šibenik-Knin, Croatia

- Interactive map of Tepljuh
- Coordinates: 43°53′47″N 16°11′58″E
- Country: Croatia
- County: Šibenik-Knin
- Municipality: Drniš

Area
  - Total: 8.1 km^{2} (3.1 sq mi)
- Elevation: 402 m (1,319 ft)

Population (2021)
  - Total: 103
  - Density: 13/km^{2} (33/sq mi)
- Postal code: 22320 Drniš
- Area code: +385 (0)22
- Vehicle registration: ŠI

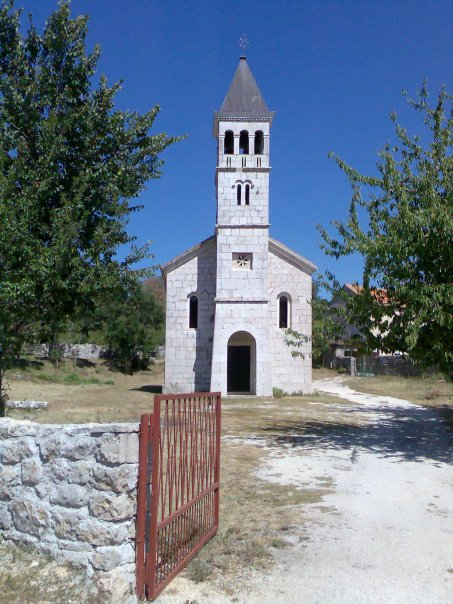
Church of St. Peter in Tepljuh

Tepljuh is a settlement in the town of Drniš in Šibenik-Knin County, Croatia. It is located about 7 kilometers northeast of Drniš, in the northwestern part of Petrovo Polje. The settlement has an average elevation of 402 meters above the sea level. In 2021, it had a total population of 103.

== Demographics ==
Tepljuh: Population trends 1857–2021
v

population	456	461	438	514	625	659	535	567	514	536	571	485	429	433	149	121	103
	1857	1869	1880	1890	1900	1910	1921	1931	1948	1953	1961	1971	1981	1991	2001	2011	2021

Sources:Croatian Bureau of Statistics publications

== Climate ==
Tepljuh has a Humid Subtropical Climate (Cfa). On average, it sees the most precipitation in November, with 164 mm of rainfall; and the least precipitation in July, with 46 mm of rainfall.

Climate data for Telpljuh
Month	Jan	Feb	Mar	Apr	May	Jun	Jul	Aug	Sep	Oct	Nov	Dec	Year
Mean daily maximum °C (°F)	6.9 (44.4)	7.9 (46.2)	11.9 (53.4)	16.2 (61.2)	20.7 (69.3)	25.4 (77.7)	28.4 (83.1)	28.8 (83.8)	22.9 (73.2)	18.0 (64.4)	12.7 (54.9)	8.2 (46.8)	17.3 (63.2)
Daily mean °C (°F)	2.8 (37.0)	3.6 (38.5)	7.1 (44.8)	11.4 (52.5)	15.9 (60.6)	20.4 (68.7)	23.2 (73.8)	23.3 (73.9)	17.8 (64.0)	13.3 (55.9)	8.8 (47.8)	4.2 (39.6)	12.6 (54.8)
Mean daily minimum °C (°F)	−0.9 (30.4)	−0.7 (30.7)	2.2 (36.0)	6.0 (42.8)	10.1 (50.2)	14.2 (57.6)	16.8 (62.2)	17.0 (62.6)	12.7 (54.9)	8.8 (47.8)	5.0 (41.0)	0.6 (33.1)	7.7 (45.8)
Average rainfall mm (inches)	99 (3.9)	100 (3.9)	104 (4.1)	121 (4.8)	103 (4.1)	71 (2.8)	46 (1.8)	57 (2.2)	104 (4.1)	124 (4.9)	164 (6.5)	134 (5.3)	1,227 (48.4)
Source: Climate-Data.org

== See also ==
- Church of St. Peter and Paul, Tepljuh
