= Church of Croatian Martyrs, Čavoglave =

Church of Croatian Martyrs
- Crkva hrvatskih mučenika
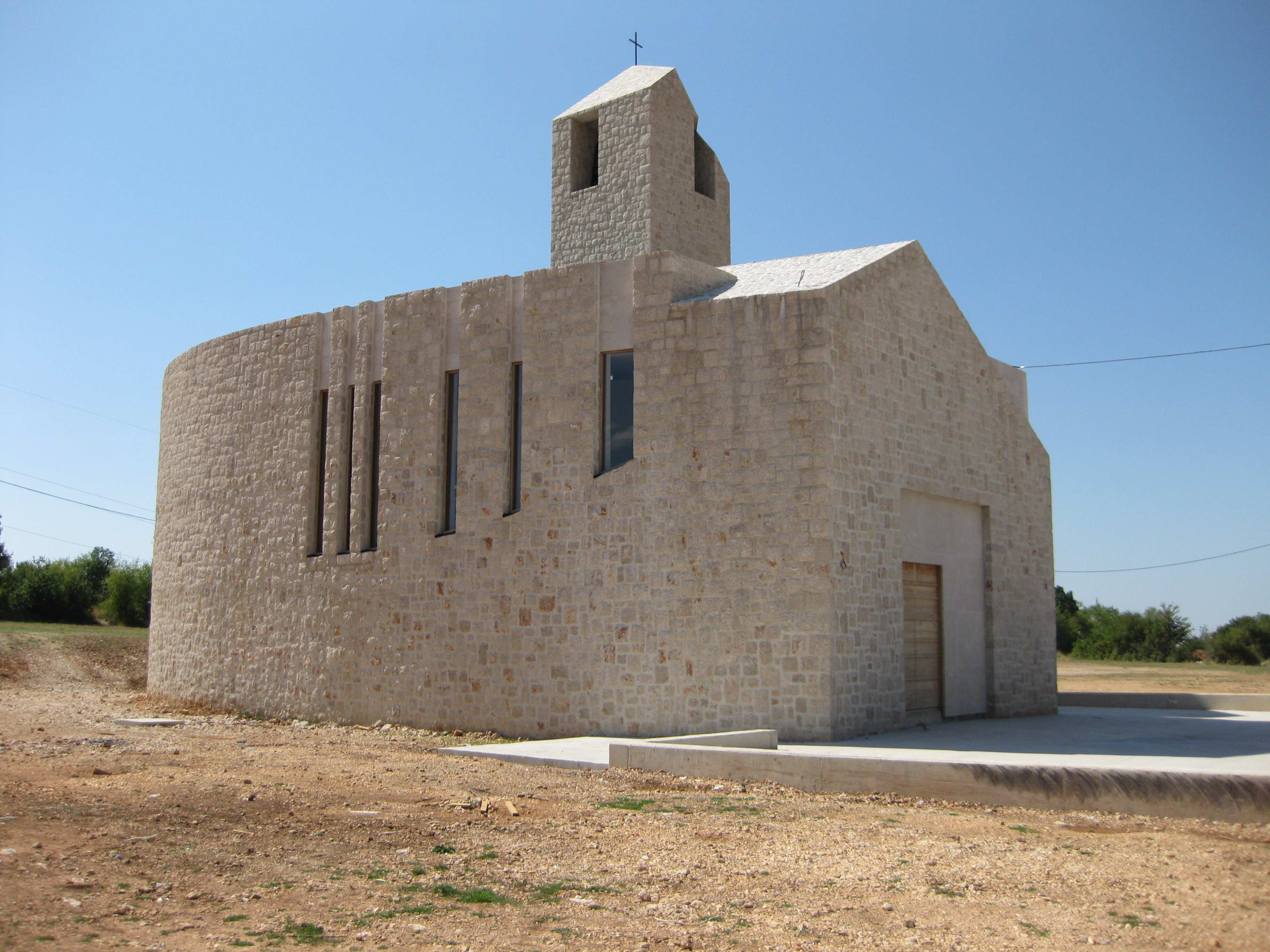
- Church of Croatian Martyrs
- 43°47′02″N 16°20′13″E
- Location: Čavoglave
- Country: Croatia
- Denomination: Roman Catholic

History
- Dedication: Croatian Martyrs

Architecture
- Functional status: Active
- Architect(s): Emil Šverko and Gorana Banić
- Groundbreaking: 2004

Administration
- Diocese: Diocese of Šibenik
- Parish: Parish of Saint Elijah, Kljaci

The Church of Croatian Martyrs (Croatian: Crkva hrvatskih mučenika) is a Roman Catholic church in Čavoglave, Šibenik-Knin County, Croatia. The church was designed by Croatian architects Emil Šverko and Gorana Banić, and built on the initiative of Croatian singer-songwriter Marko Perković born in the village. It is widely regarded as one of the best modern sacral architectural achievements in Croatia, with references to Croatian pre-Romanesque art and architecture style.

== History ==
The cornerstone for the church was laid in 2004 by Ante Ivas, Bishop of Šibenik. Croatian singer-songwriter Marko Perković, who was born in Čavoglave, was the initiator of its building and contributed funding for the construction of the church. On 9 October 2010, the church bells were blessed by Ivas, and the church's three bells were cast by the Grassmayr Bell Foundry in Innsbruck. The church was completed in 2014.

The first bell, weighing 450 kilos, is dedicated to Aloysius Stepinac. The second bell, weighing 250 kilos, is dedicated to St. Elijah. The third bell, weighing 130 kilos, is dedicated to St. Michael and St. Benedict.

On 20 September 2014, the Church was blessed, and the altar consecrated Ante Ivas, Bishop of Šibenik. The current parish priest is Father Josip Gotovac.
