= Škugor =

Škugor is a Croatian surname.

It is one of the most common surnames in the Šibenik-Knin County of Croatia.

It may refer to:

- Frankos Šcugor, Croatian tennis player
