= Danilo Biranj =

Settlement in Šibenik-Knin County, Croatia

- Settlement
- Interactive map of Danilo Biranj
- Location of Danilo Biranj in Croatia
- Coordinates: 43°43′37″N 16°00′15″E
- Country: Croatia
- County: Šibenik-Knin
- City: Šibenik

Area
  - Total: 25.5 km^{2} (9.8 sq mi)

Population (2021)
  - Total: 416
  - Density: 16.3/km^{2} (42.3/sq mi)
- Time zone: UTC+1 (CET)
  - Summer (DST): UTC+2 (CEST)
- Postal code: 22000 Šibenik
- Area code: +385 (0)22

Danilo Biranj is a settlement in the City of Šibenik in Croatia. In 2021, its population was 416.

== History ==
In Danilo Biranj, Illyrian graves and reliefs of the Illyrian deities Silvanus and Mithra were found. In the cemetery near St. George and St. Peter churches, old graves with ornaments of the moon, bread and cross can still be found today. During Roman rule, the settlement of Rider acquired the right of municipium, and later became a bishop's cathedral. With the fall of the ancient world, the town and diocese of Rider disappeared.

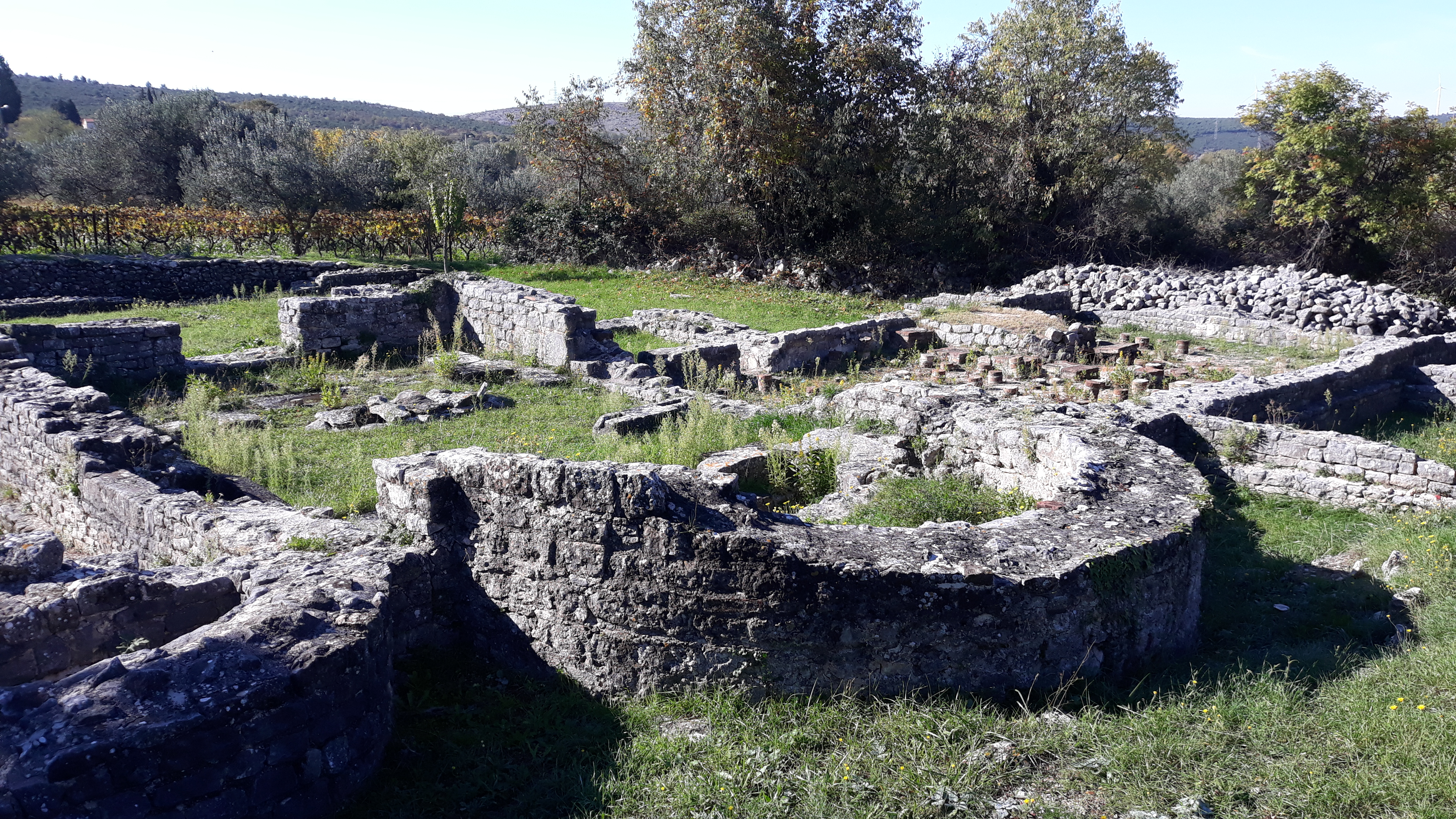
Ruins of Rider

== Demographics ==
Danilo Biranj: Population trends 1857–2021
v

population	282	297	282	273	262	321	321	358	494	542	531	526	462	477	457	442	416
	1857	1869	1880	1890	1900	1910	1921	1931	1948	1953	1961	1971	1981	1991	2001	2011	2021

Sources: Croatian Bureau of Statistics publications
