= Podine =

Settlement in Šibenik-Knin County, Croatia

- Settlement
- Interactive map of Podine
- Location of Podine in Croatia
- Coordinates: 43°38′44″N 16°03′20″E
- Country: Croatia
- County: Šibenik-Knin
- City: Šibenik

Area
  - Total: 4.6 km^{2} (1.8 sq mi)

Population (2021)
  - Total: 20
  - Density: 4.3/km^{2} (11/sq mi)
- Time zone: UTC+1 (CET)
  - Summer (DST): UTC+2 (CEST)
- Postal code: 22000 Šibenik
- Area code: +385 (0)22

Podine is a settlement in the City of Šibenik in Croatia. In 2021, its population was 20.

== Demographics ==
Podine: Population trends 1857–2021
v

population			83	94	98	133	130	221	181	195	226	187	120	59	39	26	20
	1857	1869	1880	1890	1900	1910	1921	1931	1948	1953	1961	1971	1981	1991	2001	2011	2021

Sources: Croatian Bureau of Statistics publications
