= Čikola =

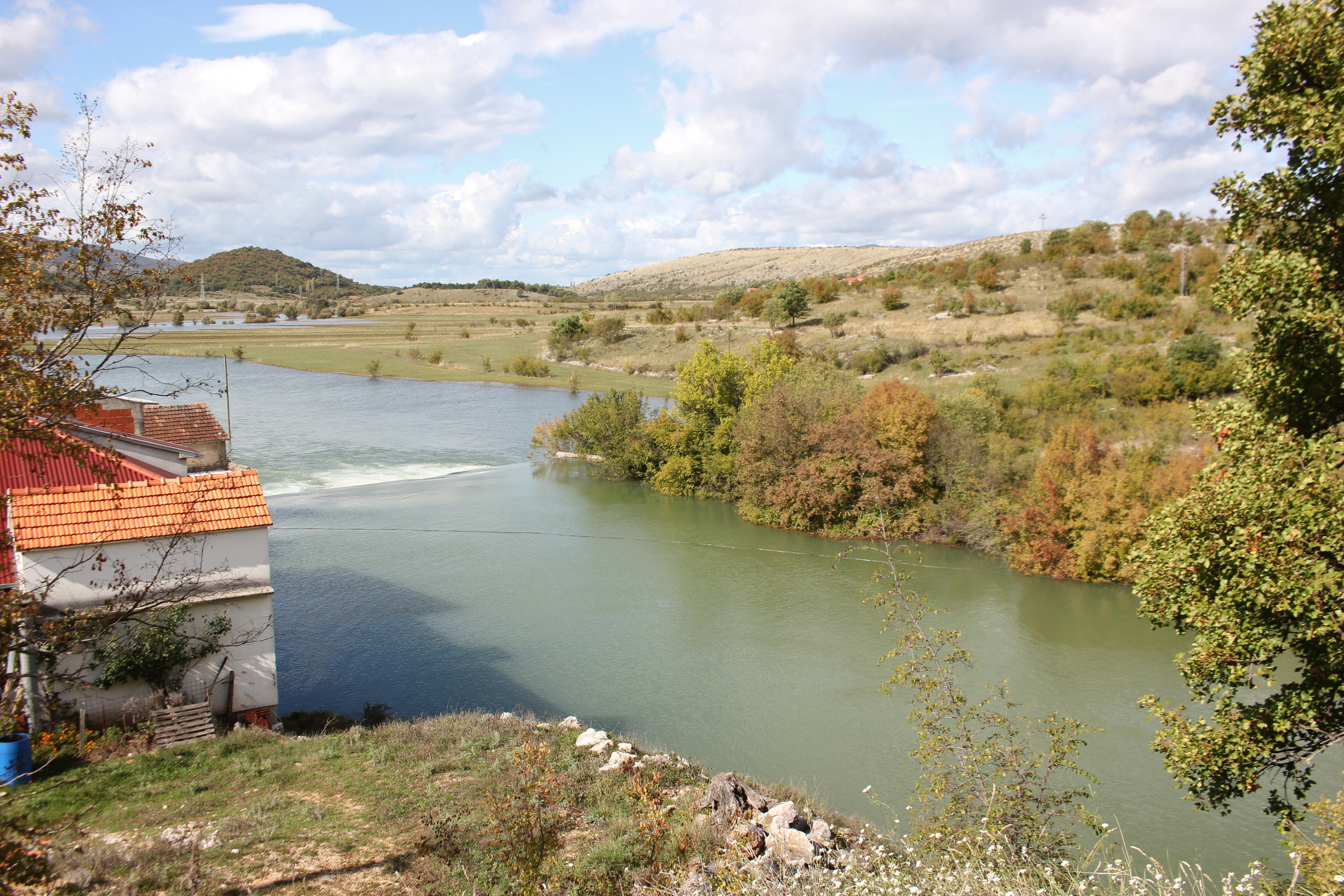
- Čikola near its source

Location
- Country: Croatia

Physical characteristics
- Mouth
  - location: Krka
  - coordinates: 43.802°N 15.978°E
- Length: 39 kilometres (24 mi)
- Basin size: 200-300 km^{2}

Basin features
- Progression: Krka→ Adriatic Sea

Čikola (Italian: Cigola) is an intermittent river of in Dalmatia, southern Croatia.

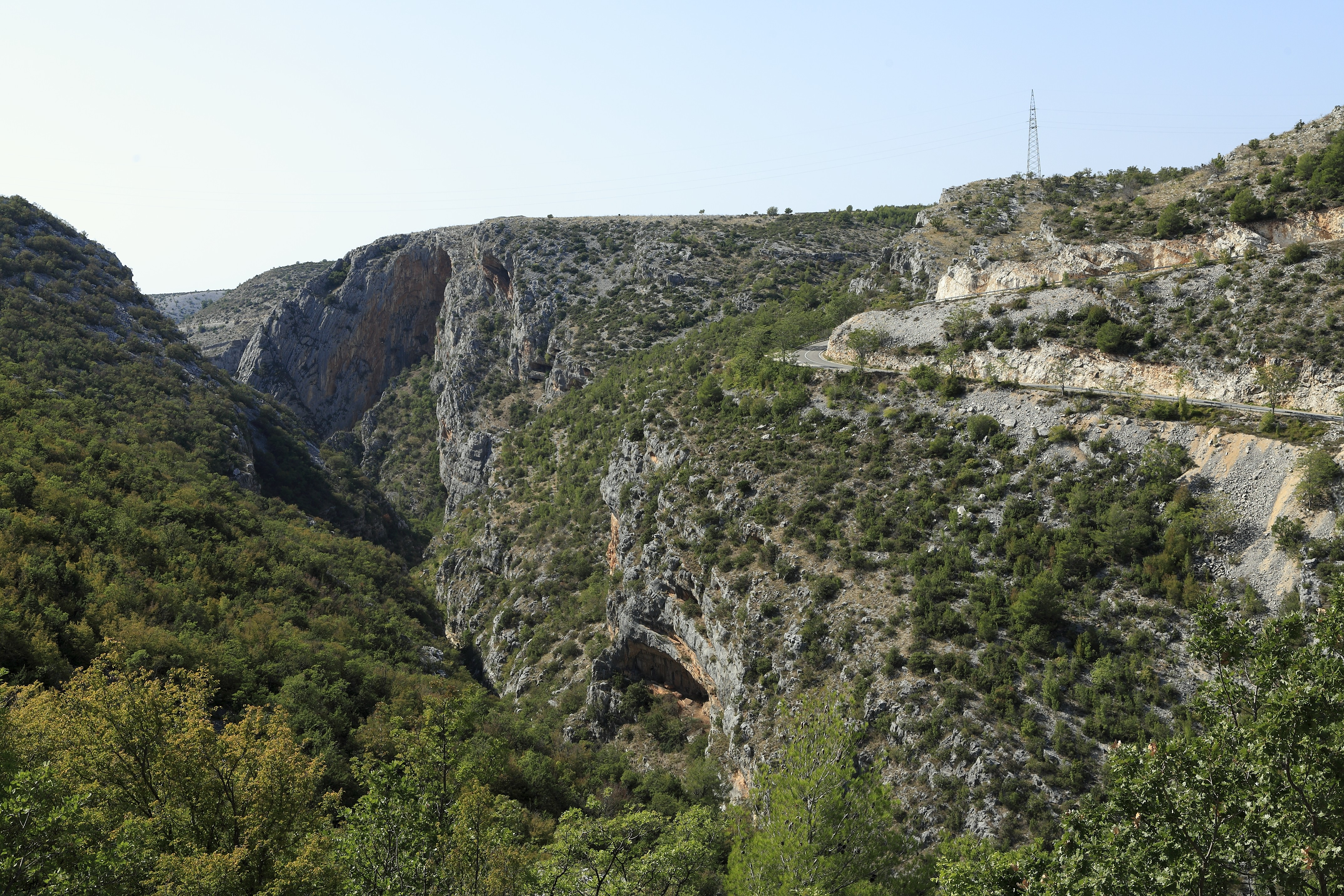
The Čikola canyons

== Description ==
Čikola is 39 kilometres (24 mi) in length, from Mirlović Polje to Krka at Nos Kalik, while its headwater Vrba that rises near Muć would add up to a combined length of about 47 km (29 mi).

=== Source and headwaters ===
The main Čikola spring is also seasonal. It is located in Mirlović Polje village at the periphery of Petrovo Polje, near the village Čavoglave. From here, the river runs south-southwest and enters Petrovo polje when it turns westward before it reaches the city of Drniš. From here Čikola again turns south-southwest and enters its canyon. Flowing-by the village of Miljevci Čikola reaches and spills into the river of Krka, which flows toward and into the Adriatic Sea.

=== Canyon ===
The canyon contrasts with the nearby mountains of Moseća, Promina, and Svilaja. The canyon is 14 km long and 170 m deep in places. It ends 3 km from the lake part of the river, i.e. 6 km before the mouth. Due to the diversity of flora and fauna, and more underwater caves that can be easily entered in summer when the river is partly dry, and even the rich historical heritage, Čikola canyon gained the status of a protected area in 1965. In addition to its natural beauty, the Čikola canyon is known for its zipline, which stretches from 30 to 120 m above sea level and has a total length of 1.4 km, which makes it one of the longest ziplines in Croatia. Thrill enthusiasts can choose between three ziplines 250, 500 and 650 meters long, along which they can ride on a steel rope at speeds up to 70 km/h (~43 mph).

=== Confluence with Krka ===
The confluence of the rivers Čikola and Krka is one of the most unusual in Croatia. They are divided by the island of Kalički Basin and the "lake" Torak, which is in actually a spring resembling a lake. The unusualness of the scene is contributed by the imbalance between these two rivers - the Krka on one side, which is a lake, and 3 kilometers of Čikola, which are submerged by the rising travertine barrier of Skradinski Buk. Lake Torak spring is 150 m in diameter and 30 m deep.

== Climate ==
The narrower area around the source of the Čikola River is climatically strongly influenced by the continental climate. The lowest average air temperature at the Čikola estuary is around 7.7°C (46°F), while the highest summer average air temperature is around 23.7°C (74°F). Around the source, the lowest average air temperature is around 5.6°C (42°F), while the highest summer average air temperature is around 22.1°C (72°F).

== Wildlife ==
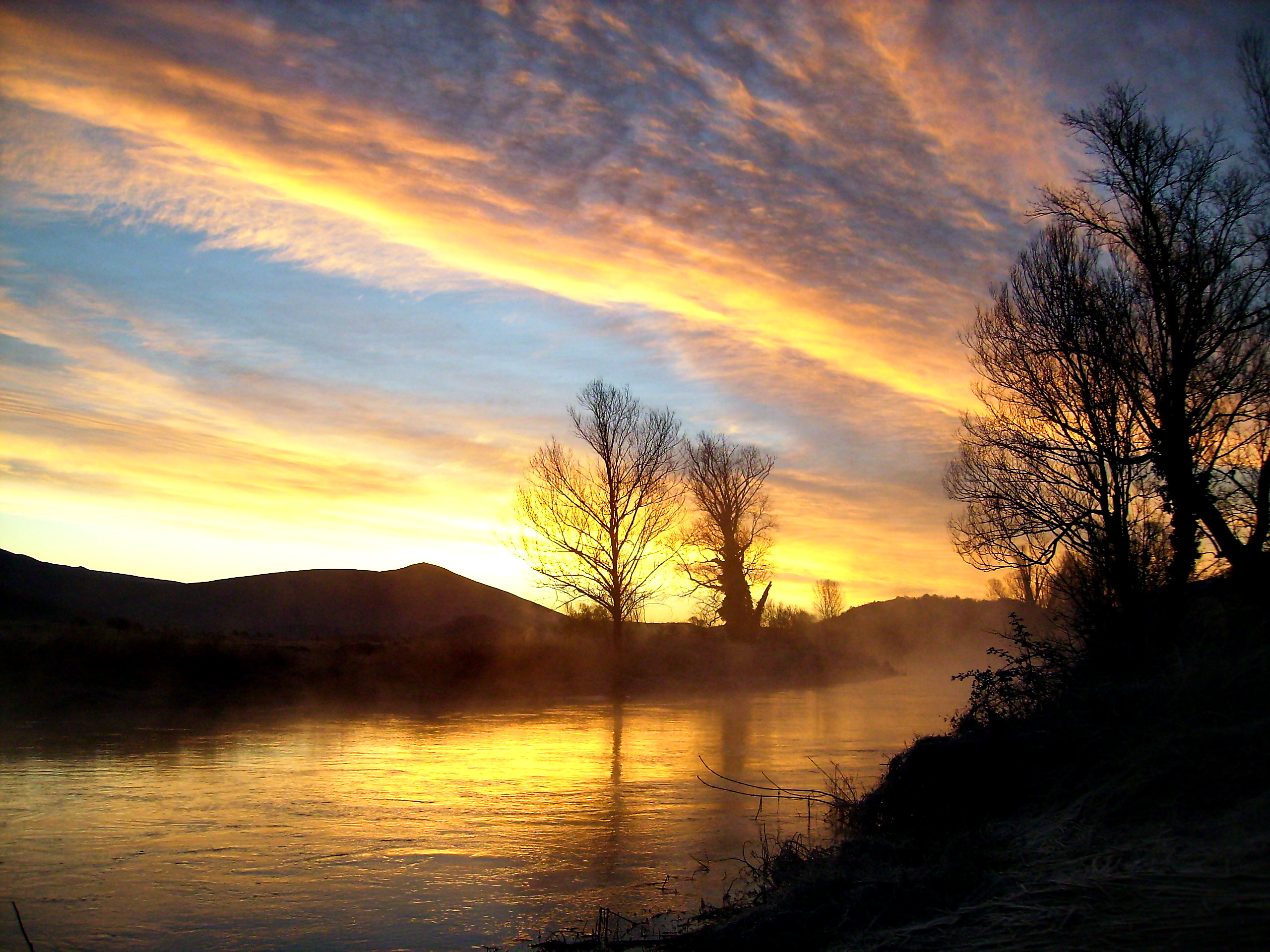
The Čikola river during Winter time.

In the Čikola, there is a very large number of gambusia (Gambusia affinis), an introduced foreign, invasive species that suppresses native species.

=== Domestic species ===
In Čikola live two exclusively endemic species: Turkish chub (Telestes turski), and Dalmatian gaovica (Phoxinellus dalmaticus). During the dry season, Turkish chub retreats into groundwater, especially to the Čikola spring.

== In popular culture ==
It is mentioned in Thompson's hit song "Bojna Čavoglave".

== See also ==
- Krka National Park
