= Vujović =

Vujović (Montenegrin and Serbian Cyrillic: Вујовић, pronounced [ʋûːjoʋitɕ]) is a Montenegrin (from Cetinje), Croatian (from Štikovo, variant of Vujević) and Serbian surname. Notable people with the surname include:

- Dušan Vujović (1951–2025), Serbian economist and politician
- Goran Vujović (born 1987), Montenegrin footballer
- Marija Vujović (born 1984), Montenegrin supermodel
- Nikola Vujović (footballer, born 1981), Montenegrin footballer
- Oliver Vujović (born 1969), Yugoslav, German, and Austrian former journalist and SEEMO General Secretary
- Ratko Vujović (1916–1977), Montenegrin political activist and soldier
- Vladimir Vujović (1922–1988), the birth name of French actor Michel Auclair
- Vladimir Vujović (footballer) (born 1982), Montenegrin footballer
- Vojislav Vujović (1897–1936), prominent Yugoslav Communist and secretary of the Communist Youth International
- Zlatko Vujović (born 1958), Croatian footballer, twin brother of Zoran
- Zoran Vujović (born 1958), Croatian footballer

== See also ==
- Nicolás Vuyovich, Argentinian
