= Štikovo =

- Location within Croatia
- Coordinates: 43°55′N 16°19′E
- Country: Croatia
- County: Šibenik-Knin
- City: Drniš

Area
  - Total: 25.5 km^{2} (9.8 sq mi)

Population (2021)
  - Total: 31
  - Density: 1.2/km^{2} (3.1/sq mi)
- Time zone: UTC+1 (CET)
  - Summer (DST): UTC+2 (CEST)

Štikovo is a small village in the Šibenik-Knin County, Croatia.

Village is located in inland Dalmatia, halfway between towns of Vrlika and Drniš. Štikovo has a population of 82, both Serbs and Croats.
