= Umljanović =

Settlement in Croatia

Umljanovići
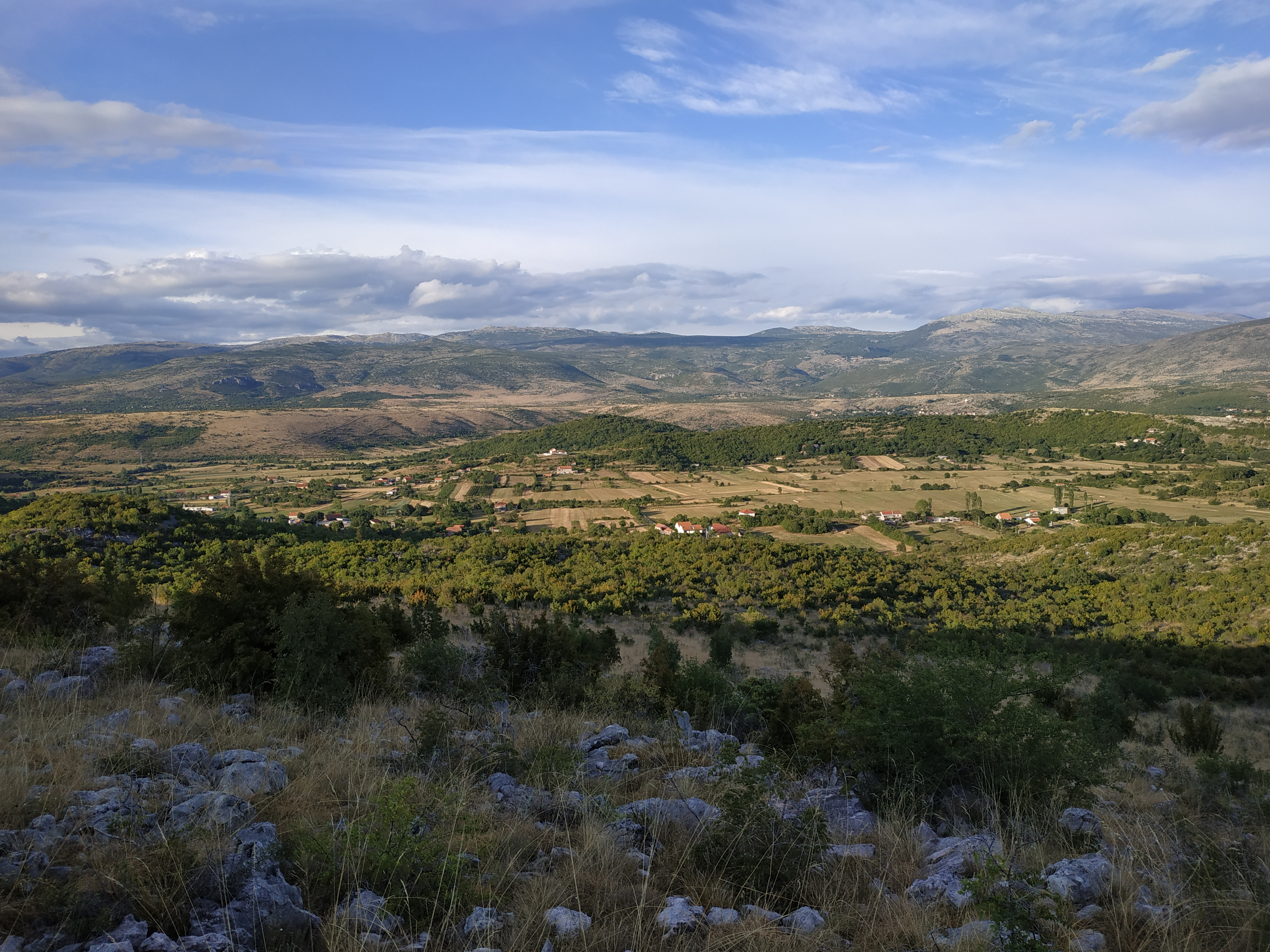

- Location within Croatia
- Coordinates: 43°48′N 16°18′E
- Country: Croatia
- County: Šibenik-Knin
- Municipality: Ružić

Area
  - Total: 15.7 km^{2} (6.1 sq mi)

Population (2021)
  - Total: 100
  - Density: 6.4/km^{2} (16/sq mi)
- Time zone: UTC+1 (CET)
  - Summer (DST): UTC+2 (CEST)

Umljanović is a village in Ružić municipality, Šibenik-Knin County, Dalmatia, Croatia. Population is 148 (2011 census).
