= Church of Sts. Peter and Paul, Tepljuh =

Serbian Orthodox church in Tepljuh, Croatia

Church of Saints Peter and Paul
- Crkva svetih Petra i Pavla; Црква светих Петра и Павла
- Church of Saint Peter and Paul
- Church of Saints Peter and Paul
- 43°53′41.5″N 16°12′47″E
- Location: Tepljuh
- Country: Croatia
- Denomination: Serbian Orthodox

History
- Dedication: Saint Apostles Peter and Paul

Architecture
- Years built: 1887

The Church of Saints Peter and Paul in Tepljuh (Biočić) is Serbian Orthodox church in Croatia. The church was built in 1887 at the site of an older church building and consecrated by bishop Stefan Knežević of the Eparchy of Dalmatia in the same year on May 17th. The reconstruction of the church building was initiated in 2016 by diaspora from the village of Biočić. The church belongs to a relatively small number of Serbian Orthodox church buildings with bell towers constructed like a turret divided into floors.

== See also ==
- List of Serbian Orthodox churches in Croatia
