= Siverić =

Coordinates: 43°53′N 16°12′E

- Village
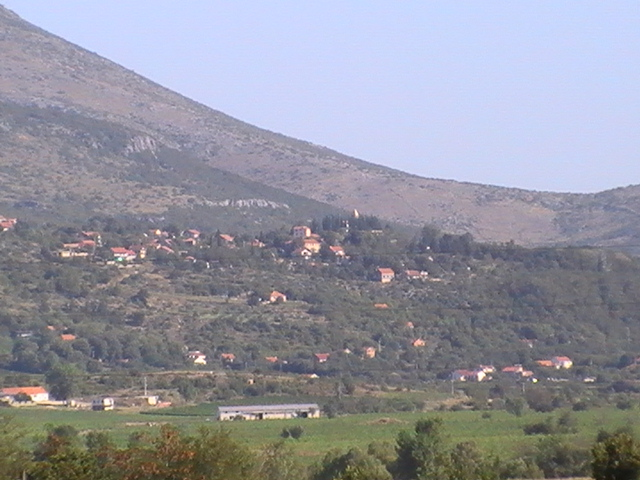
- View of Siverić, Croatia
- Interactive map of Siverić
- Country: Croatia
- County: Šibenik-Knin County
- City: Drniš

Area
  - Total: 11.3 km^{2} (4.4 sq mi)

Population (2021)
  - Total: 426
  - Density: 37.7/km^{2} (97.6/sq mi)
- Time zone: UTC+1 (CET)
  - Summer (DST): UTC+2 (CEST)
- Postal code: 22321 Siverić
- Area code: +385 (0)22

Siverić is a village in Croatia.

== Notable people ==
- Zdravko Krstanović
- Dado Topić
