= Dalmatian Hinterland =

Geographical region of Croatia

Coordinates: 43°42′42″N 16°17′02″E

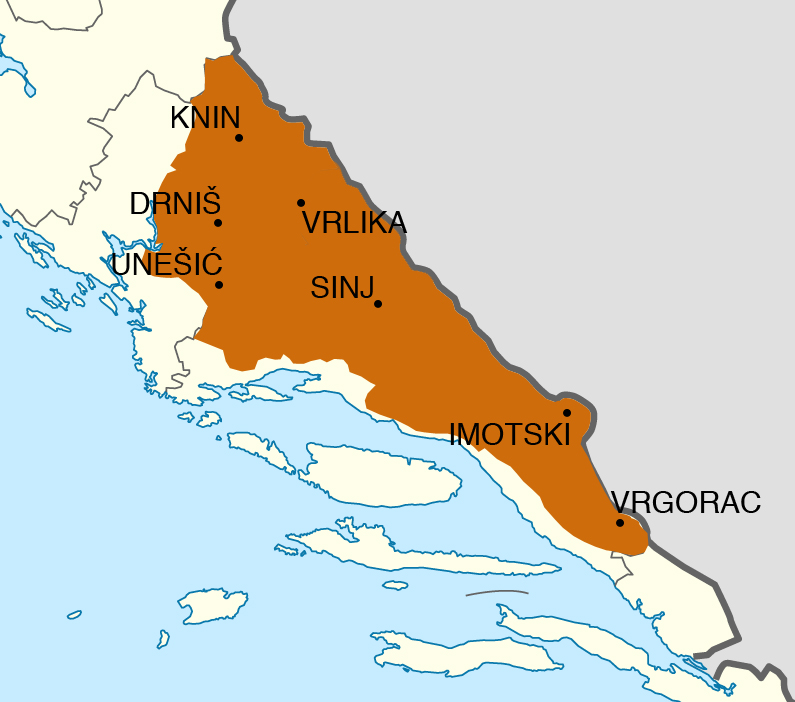
Approximate area of the Dalmatian Hinterland

The Dalmatian Hinterland (Croatian: Dalmatinsko zaobalje or Dalmatinsko zaleđe) is the inland hinterland in the historical region of Dalmatia, in southern Croatia. In Croatia, the region began to be called "Dalmatinska zagora" only in the last century, although it has always been a number of separate historical regions (krajina), one of which was Zagora in the hinterland of Šibenik and Trogir. The name zagora means 'beyond (the) hills', which is a reference to the fact that it is the part of Dalmatia that is not coastal and the existence of the concordant coastline where hills run parallel to the coast.

== Geography ==
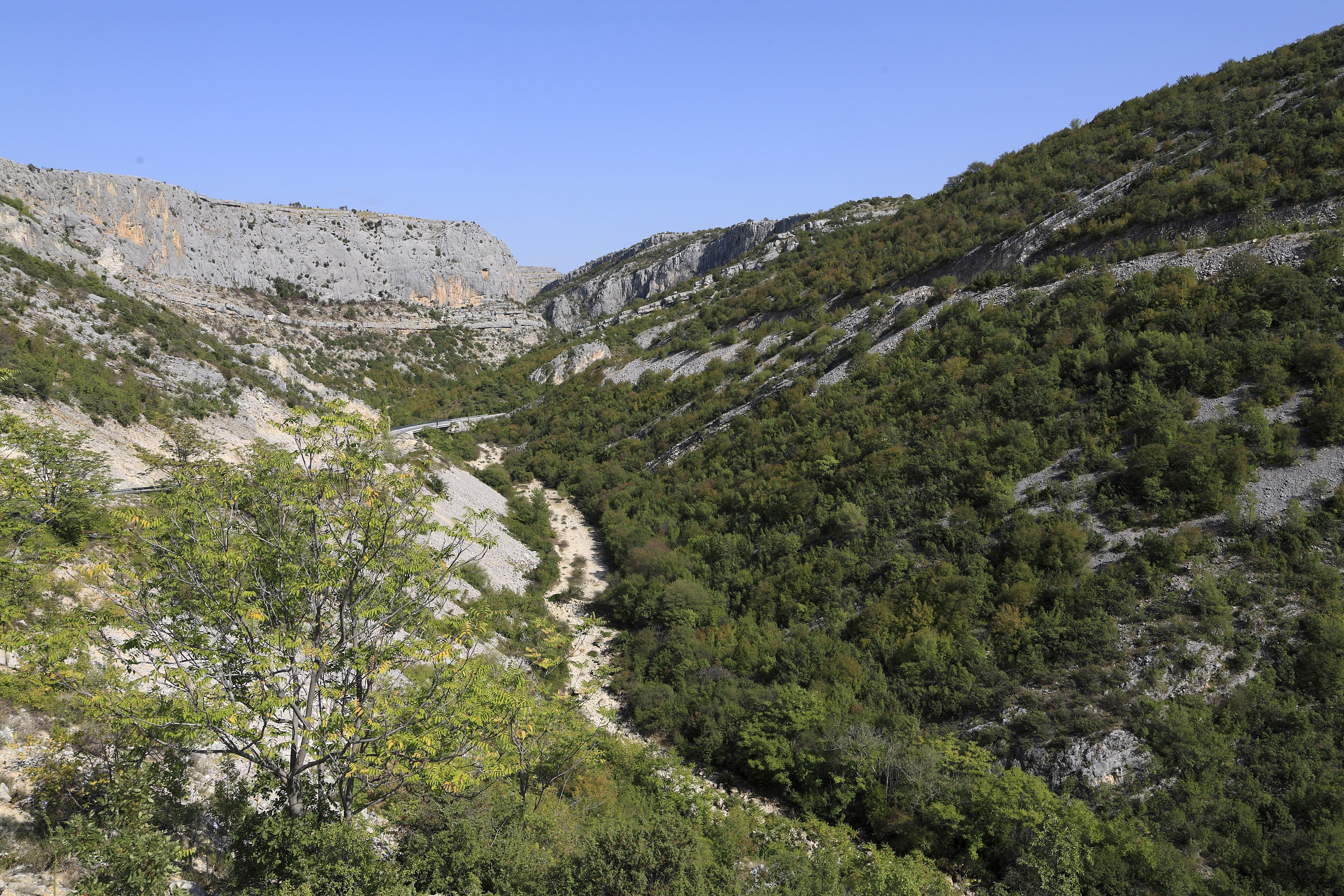
An elevated karst area, typical of the Dalmatian hinterland

Dalmatian Hinterland, in the strict sense, spans from the hinterland east of Šibenik to the border with Bosnia and Herzegovina and continues south to Vrgorac, just north of the Neum corridor. Its borders are present in two counties: Split-Dalmatia and Šibenik-Knin. It is made up of several minor regions, called "krajine" (frontiers), which are: Imotska krajina, Cetinska krajina, Kninska krajina, Drniška krajina and Vrgoračka krajina. Along with these are two that are not called "krajine": Poljička republika, named after the Poljica Republic and Zagora (which spreads north-south from the Drniška krajina to the Kozjak hill and east-west from Sinjska krajina to the hinterland of the Rogoznica and Primošten municipalities) whose label is used to describe the entire hinterland.

An elevated karst area, typical of the Dalmatian hinterland

The terrain is fairly rugged: in the region immediately bordering the coastline, it is mostly flat but dry, mainly covered with makija (maquis, macchia). More inland, greener pastures can be seen, as the climate and elevations change. Karst topography dominates the landscape. The land is interspersed with river canyons, of Krka, Čikola, Cetina and others.

The landscape supports the cultivation of grapevines and tobacco, as well as livestock farming, particularly sheep and goats. The geographical and climate conditions influenced the life patterns of the historically important shepherd population: in the wintertime, they were moving their numerous flocks from the mountains to the coast.

== History ==
In antiquity, the area was inhabited by the Illyrian tribes Dalmatae and, in the far east, Daorsi, later becoming part of the Roman province of Dalmatia. Dalmatian Hinterland was a central territory of the early medieval Croatian state. Byzantine emperor Constantine VII Porphyrogenitus (c. 950) identified this region's counties of Knin, Imota, and Cetina. Knin served as an occasional capital for Croatian rulers in the 10th and 11th centuries and later as the seat for bans, dukes, and dioceses. Catholic Vlachs have been mentioned alongside Croats in the Dalmatian hinterland since the 14th century. Their privileged part (the so-called royal Vlachs) enjoyed autonomy, but over time they became Croatized.

By the early 16th century, the region fell entirely under Ottoman rule within the Sanjak of Klis. Much of the indigenous Croatian population fled, while Orthodox populations (called Vlachs as well) from the Balkan interior settled in the area.

The Venetian Republic expelled the Ottomans in the late 17th and early 18th centuries. Following the fall of Venice, the region passed through French and Habsburg rule.

During the 19th century, infrastructure improved significantly with the construction of the Marmont Road (1813) and the arrival of railways in the late 19th and early 20th centuries. In the 20th century, Dalmatian Hinterland became part of Yugoslavia (1918) and later the Banovina of Croatia (1939). During World War II, it was nominally part of the Independent State of Croatia but witnessed heavy fighting involving partisans, Chetniks, and occupying Italian and German forces.

During the Croatian War of Independence (1991–1995), Knin and its surroundings became the center of the Serb rebellion. Croatian forces liberated the occupied territories in August 1995 during Operation Storm, leading to a mass exodus of the Serb population. After the war, exiled Croats returned, alongside Croat settlers from other parts of the former Yugoslavia and some returning Serb refugees.

== Settlements ==
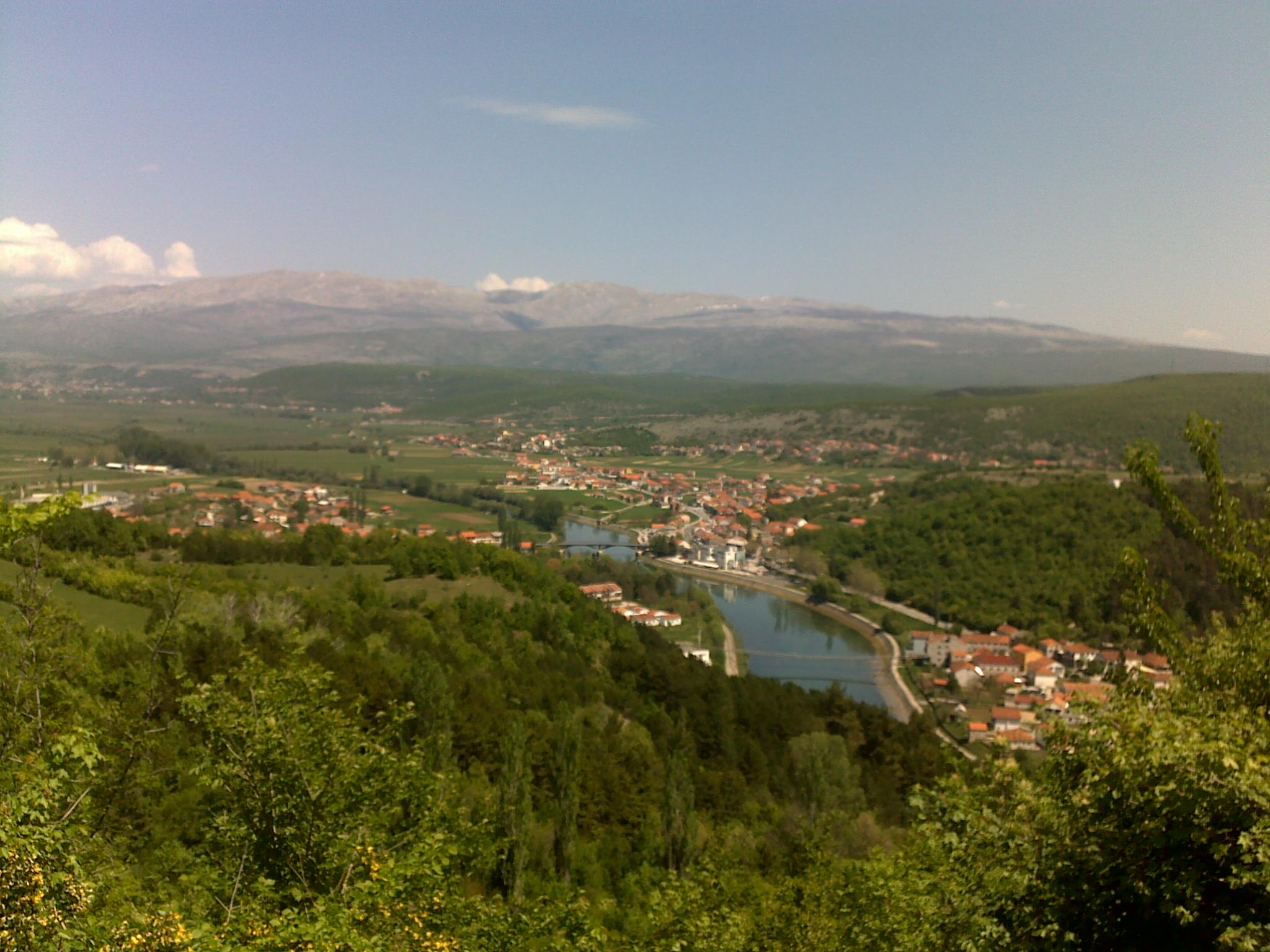
Trilj

The area has had diminishing human settlement in the last few centuries, although many towns and villages remain scattered all over Dalmatian Hinterland. The larger towns include Knin, Drniš, Vrlika, Sinj, Vrgorac, Trilj and Imotski. Villages include Biskupija, Kistanje, Kijevo, Unešić, Oklaj, Ružić, Aržano, Dicmo, Muć, Cista Provo, Prgomet, Hrvace, Lovreć, Šestanovac, Zmijavci, etc.

== Infrastructure ==
Dalmatian Hinterland is intersected by two major roads: the D1 state road which comes from Zagreb, crosses from Lika through Knin and Sinj, down to Split, and the A1 highway, which meanders near Zadar and Benkovac, passing throughout Zagora, via the Dugopolje exit (to Split) and on to Ploče.

The railway links Zagreb with Knin, with branches from Knin to Zadar, from Knin to Perković, where the line splits to Šibenik or to Split.

== See also ==
- Geography of Croatia
- Morlachs

== Sources ==
- Dalmatinska zagora (in Croatian)
