= Ružić, Croatia =

Ružić
- Municipality
- Općina Ružić; Municipality of Ružić
- Interactive map of Ružić
- Location within Croatia
- Coordinates: 43°49′N 16°15′E
- Country: Croatia
- Region: Dalmatia (Dalmatian Hinterland)
- County: Šibenik-Knin County

Government
  - Mayor: Dalibor Durdov (HDZ)

Area
  - Municipality: 161.0 km^{2} (62.2 sq mi)
  - Urban: 8.7 km^{2} (3.4 sq mi)

Population (2021)
  - Municipality: 1,283
  - Density: 7.969/km^{2} (20.64/sq mi)
  - Urban: 228
  - Urban density: 26/km^{2} (68/sq mi)
- Time zone: UTC+1 (CET)
  - Summer (DST): UTC+2 (CEST)
- Postal code: 22320 Drniš
- Website: opcina-ruzic.hr

Ružić is a village and a municipality in Šibenik-Knin County, Croatia. In the 2011 census, it had a total of 1,591 inhabitants. In the 2011 census, 98.99% of the population were Croats.

== Demographics ==
In 2021, the municipality had 1,283 residents in the following 9 settlements:

- Baljci, population 8
- Čavoglave, population 147
- Gradac, population 275
- Kljake, population 173
- Mirlović Polje, population 133
- Moseć, population 68
- Otavice, population 151
- Ružić, population 228
- Umljanović, population 100
Ružić: Population trends 1857–2021
v

population	4338	4236	4077	4256	4912	5131	5039	5453	5548	5643	5560	5551	4503	3355	1775	1591	1283
	1857	1869	1880	1890	1900	1910	1921	1931	1948	1953	1961	1971	1981	1991	2001	2011	2021

Sources: Croatian Bureau of Statistics publications
