= Kljake =

- Village
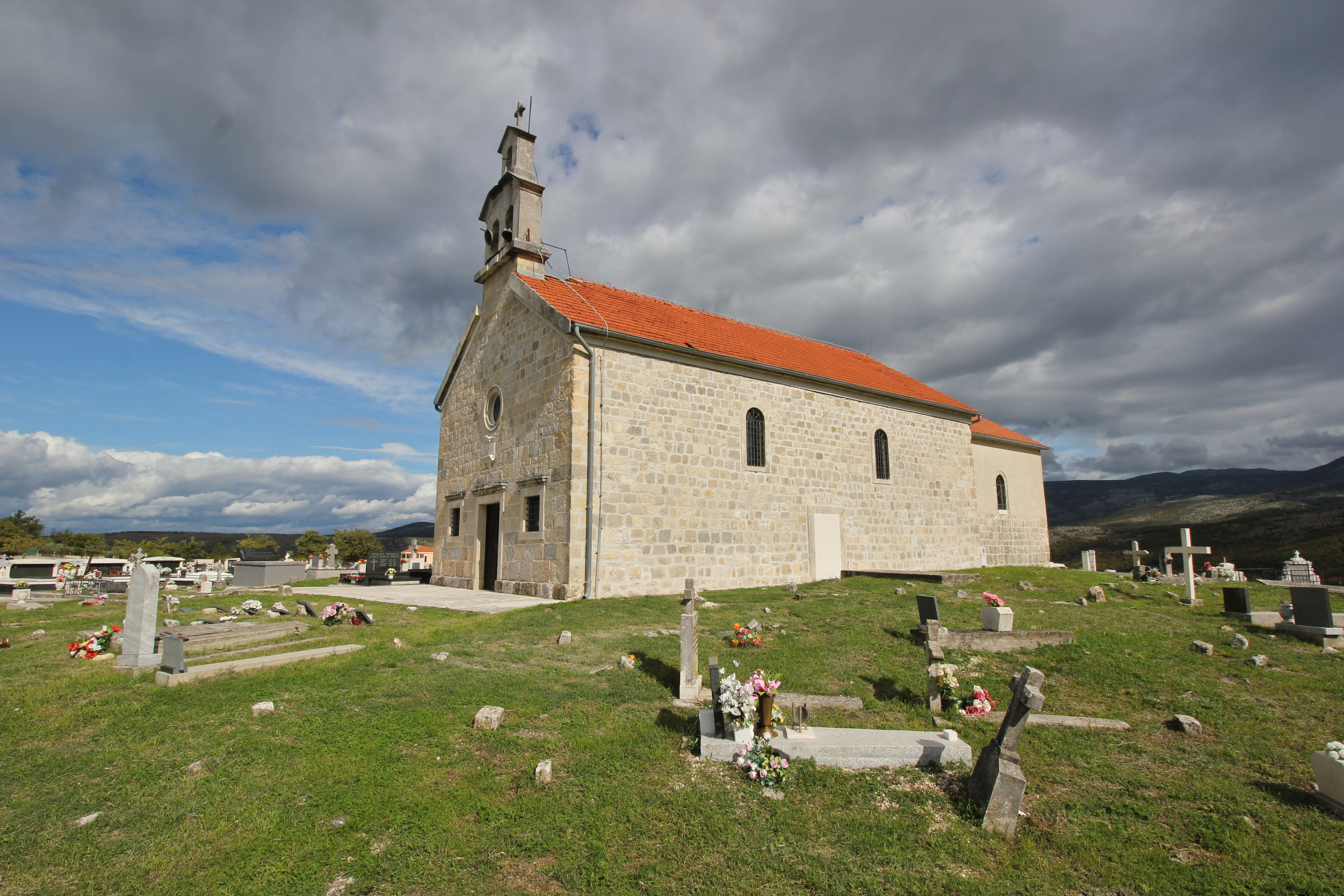
- Church of Sveti Ilija in Klakje

- Location within Croatia
- Coordinates: 43°46′34″N 16°19′9″E
- Country: Croatia
- County: Šibenik-Knin County
- Municipality: Ružić

Area
  - Total: 7.6 sq mi (19.8 km^{2})
- Elevation: 1,207 ft (368 m)

Population (2021)
  - Total: 173
  - Density: 22.6/sq mi (8.74/km^{2})
- Time zone: UTC+1 (CET)
  - Summer (DST): UTC+2 (CEST)
- Postal code: 22322 Ružić

Kljake is a village in Šibenik-Knin County, Croatia. The settlement is administered as a part of Ružić municipality. In the 2011 census, it had a total of 261 inhabitants.
