= Gradac, Šibenik-Knin County =

Gradac
- Village
- Location within Croatia
- Coordinates: 43°49′29″N 16°16′45″E
- Country: Croatia
- County: Šibenik-Knin County
- Municipality: Ružić

Area
  - Total: 6.7 sq mi (17.3 km^{2})
- Elevation: 1,001 ft (305 m)

Population (2021)
  - Total: 275
  - Density: 41.2/sq mi (15.9/km^{2})
- Time zone: UTC+1 (CET)
  - Summer (DST): UTC+2 (CEST)
- Postal code: 22322 Ružić

Gradac is a village in Šibenik-Knin County, Croatia. The settlement is administered as a part of Ružić municipality. In the 2011 census, it had a total of 317 inhabitants.
