= Mirlović Polje =

- Village
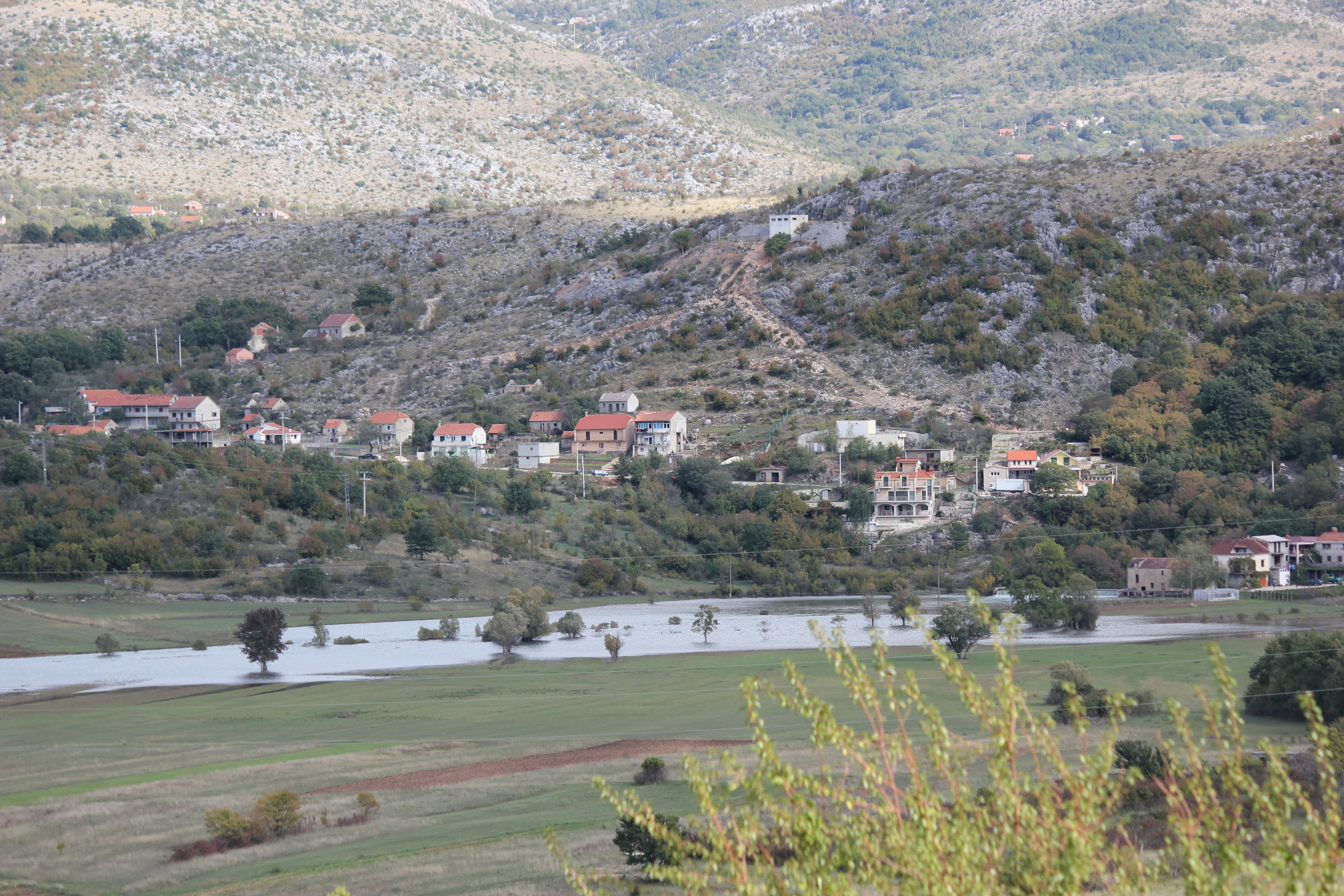
- Mirlović Polje on Čikola River source

- Location within Croatia
- Coordinates: 43°48′47″N 16°20′19″E
- Country: Croatia
- County: Šibenik-Knin County
- Municipality: Ružić

Area
  - Total: 10.6 sq mi (27.5 km^{2})
- Elevation: 1,362 ft (415 m)

Population (2021)
  - Total: 133
  - Density: 12.5/sq mi (4.84/km^{2})
- Time zone: UTC+1 (CET)
  - Summer (DST): UTC+2 (CEST)
- Postal code: 22322 Ružić

Mirlović Polje is a village in Šibenik-Knin County, Croatia. The settlement is administered as a part of Ružić municipality. In the 2011 census, it had a total of 170 inhabitants.
