= Moseć =

- Village
- Location within Croatia
- Coordinates: 43°47′45″N 16°13′22″E
- Country: Croatia
- County: Šibenik-Knin County
- Municipality: Ružić

Area
  - Total: 4.7 sq mi (12.2 km^{2})
- Elevation: 1,929 ft (588 m)

Population (2021)
  - Total: 68
  - Density: 14/sq mi (5.6/km^{2})
- Time zone: UTC+1 (CET)
  - Summer (DST): UTC+2 (CEST)
- Postal code: 22322 Ružić

Moseć is a village in Šibenik-Knin County, Croatia. The settlement is administered as a part of Ružić municipality. In the 2011 census, it had a total of 75 inhabitants.
