= Otavice, Croatia =

Otavice
- Interactive map of Otavice
- Location within Croatia
- Coordinates: 43°51′N 16°16′E
- Country: Croatia
- County: Šibenik-Knin
- Municipality: Ružić

Area
  - Total: 11.5 km^{2} (4.4 sq mi)

Population (2021)
  - Total: 151
  - Density: 13.1/km^{2} (34.0/sq mi)
- Time zone: UTC+1 (CET)
  - Summer (DST): UTC+2 (CEST)

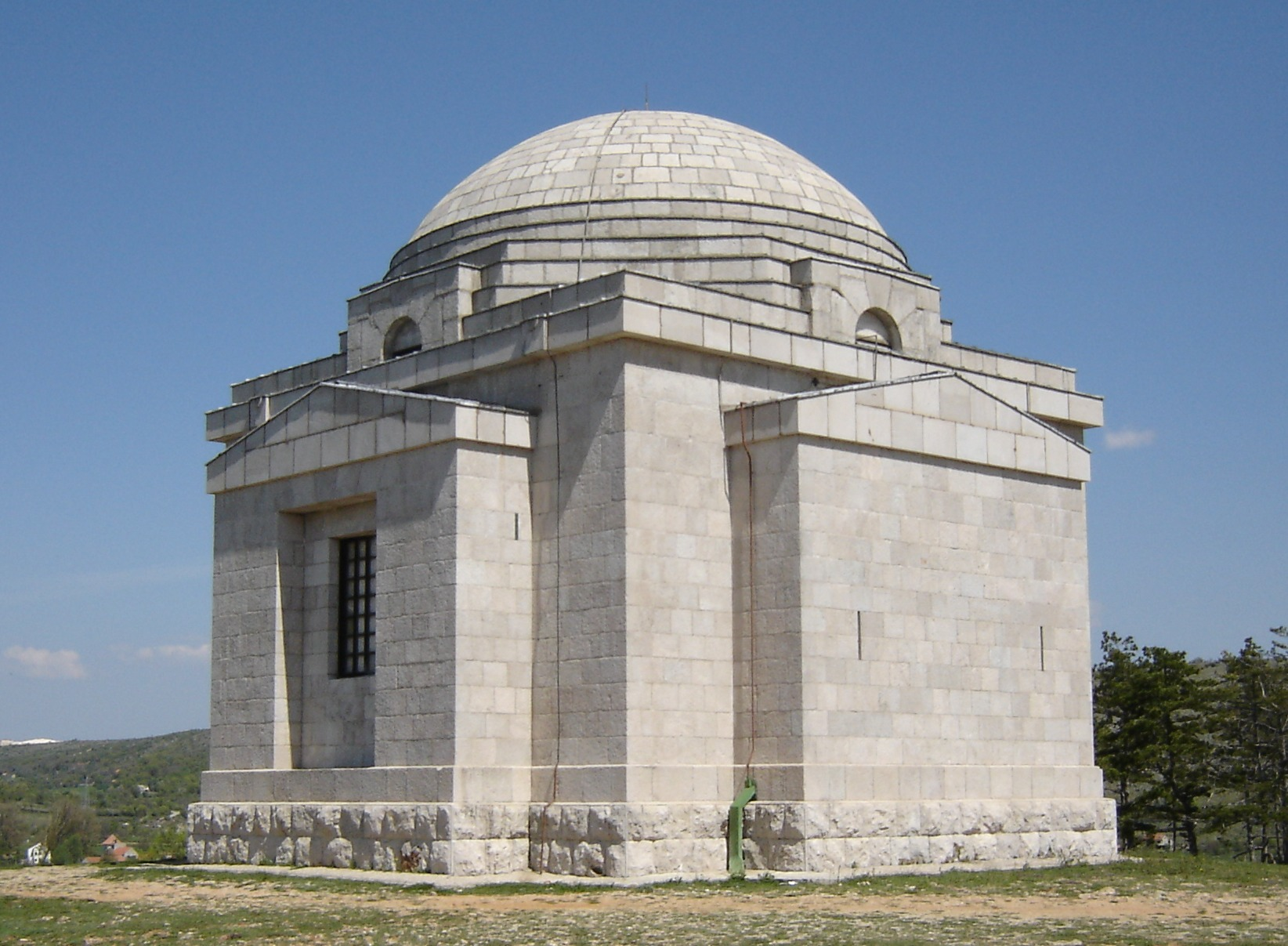
Meštrović family mausoleum near Otavice

Otavice is a small village in Dalmatian hinterland in Croatia, located on edge of Petrovo field, approximately 35 km away from the city of Šibenik. The village has 183 permanent inhabitants (2011 census).

Houses in Otavice are built mostly of concrete, and some of stone. Before its present location, the village Otavice was located on the nearby Svilaja mountain, spread in several groups of houses and barns, named after the family names of the people who lived there. In the 20th century, all this population relocated toward the valley and built new houses.

In Otavice, on a hill, there is a Meštrović family mausoleum, built by the famous Croatian sculptor Ivan Meštrović.
