= Šibenik-Knin County =

Region in southern Croatia

Coordinates: 43.929°N 16.062°E

Šibenik-Knin County Šibensko-kninska županija (Croatian)
- County
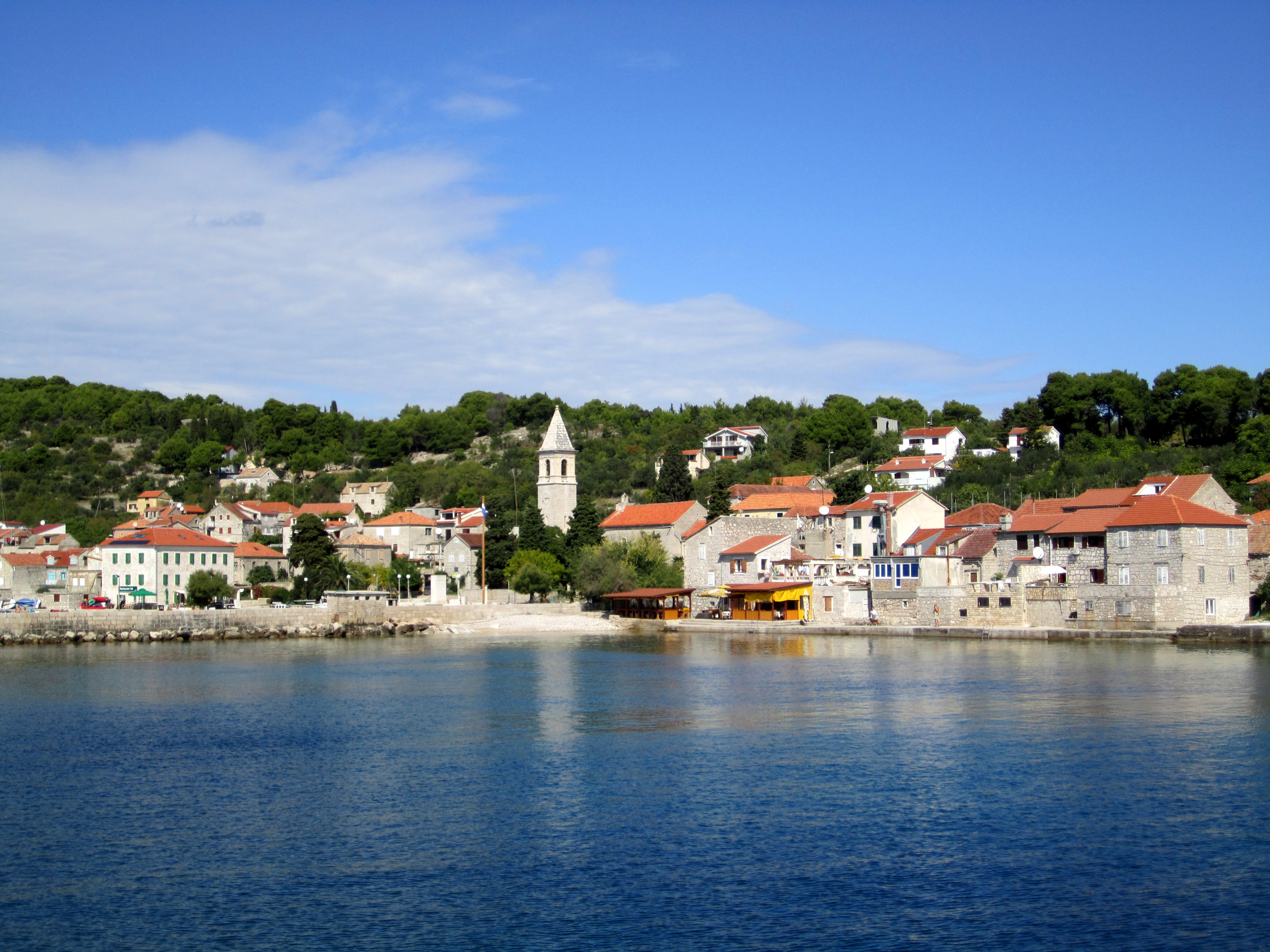
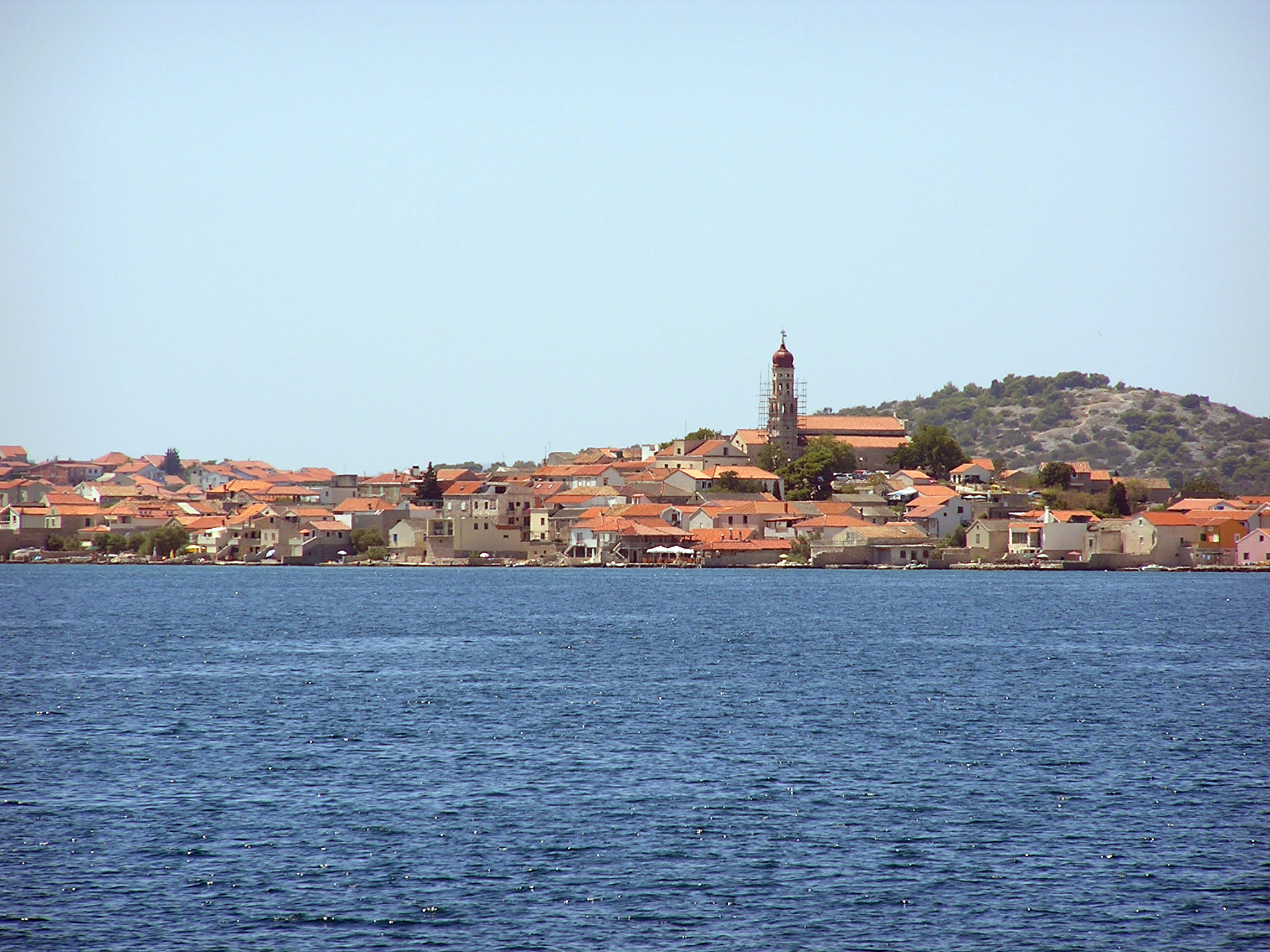
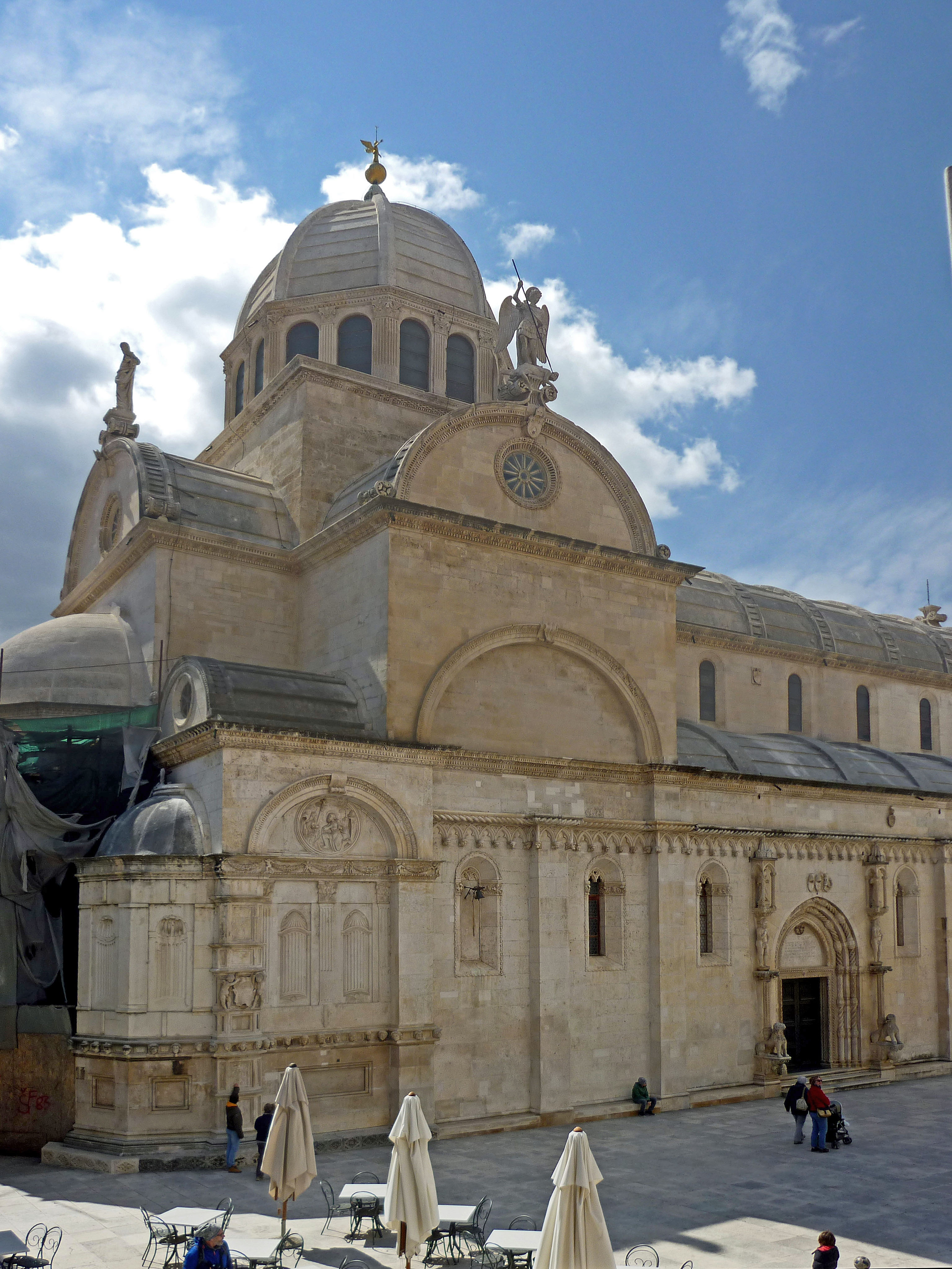
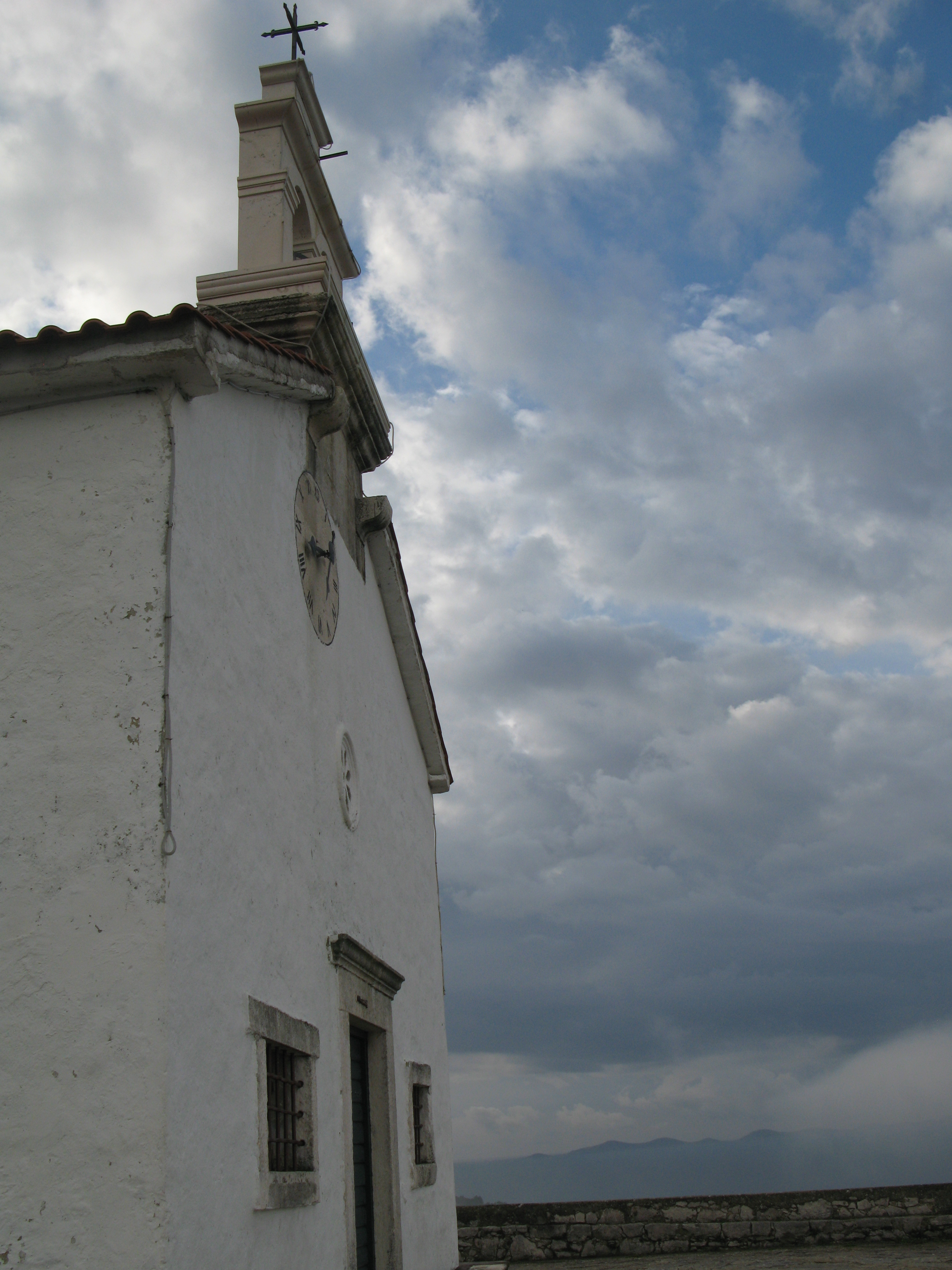
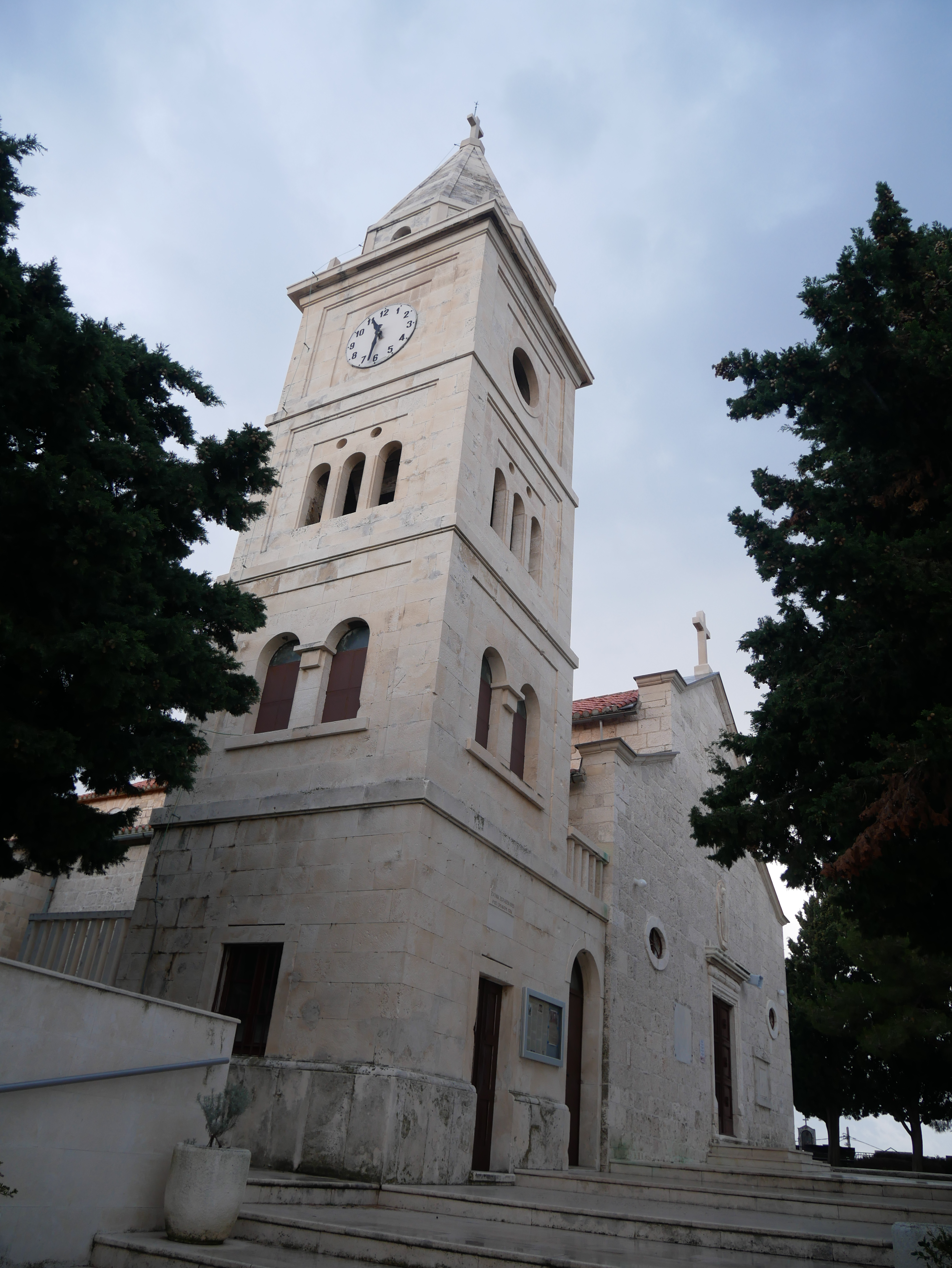
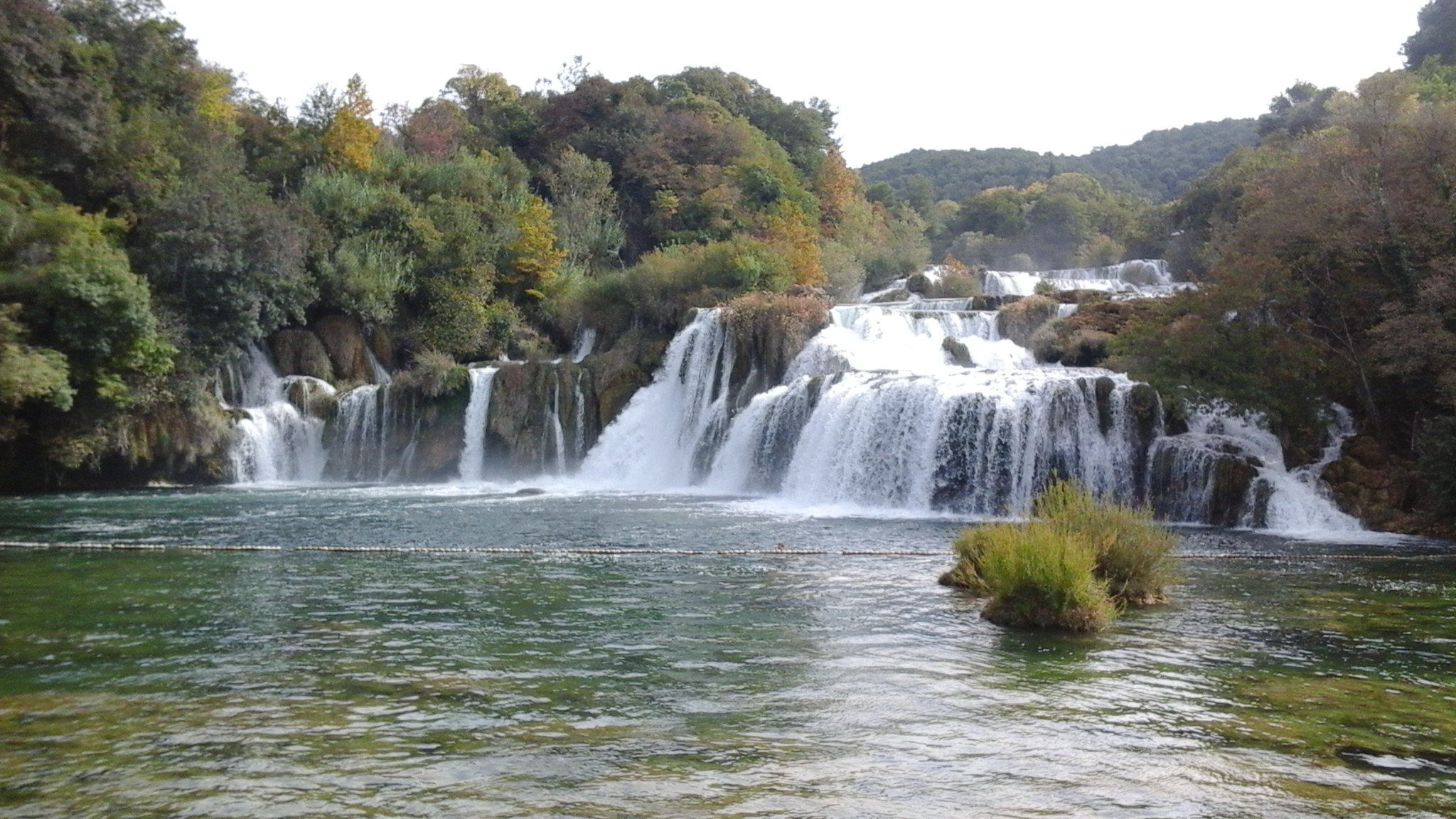
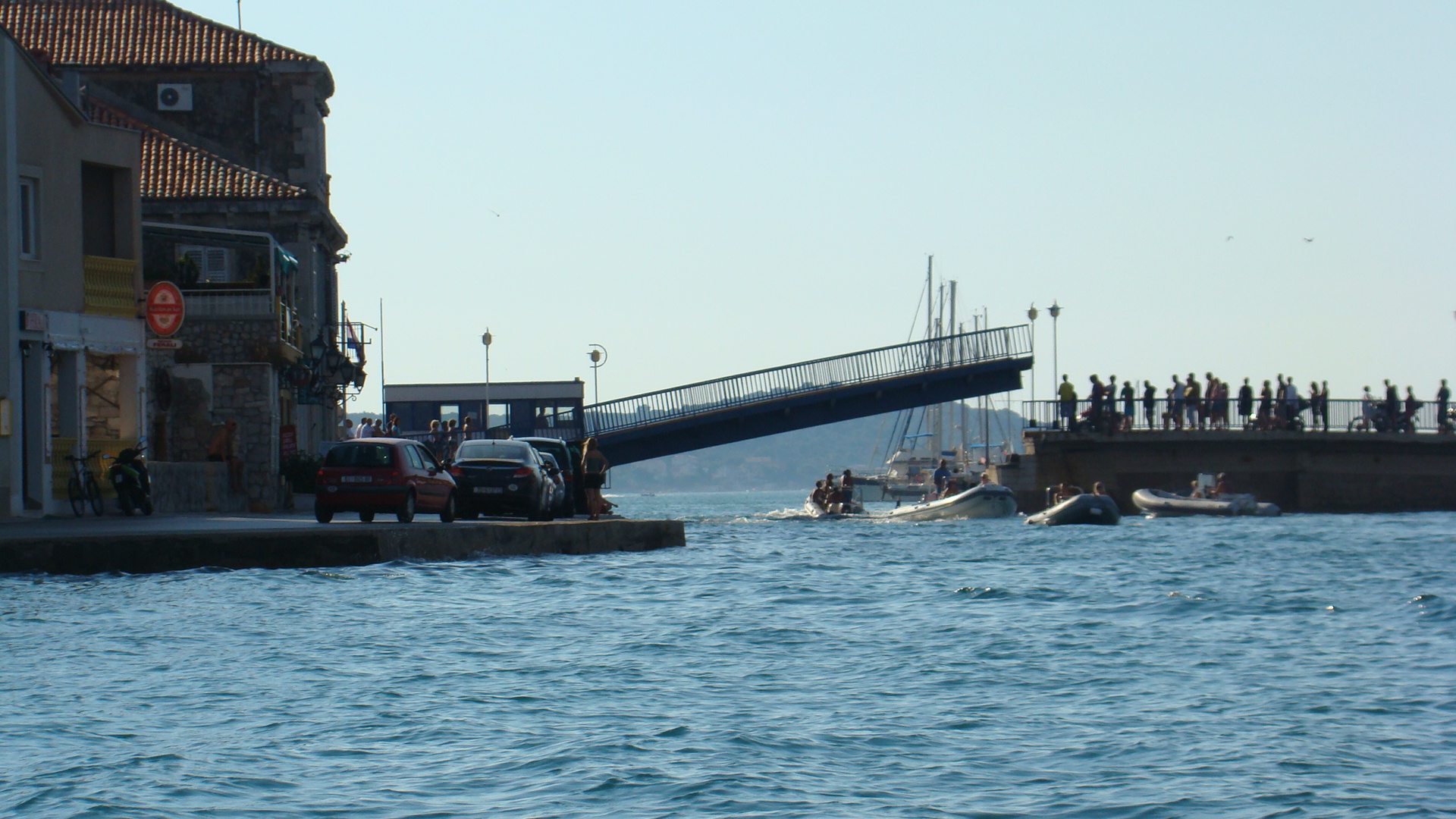
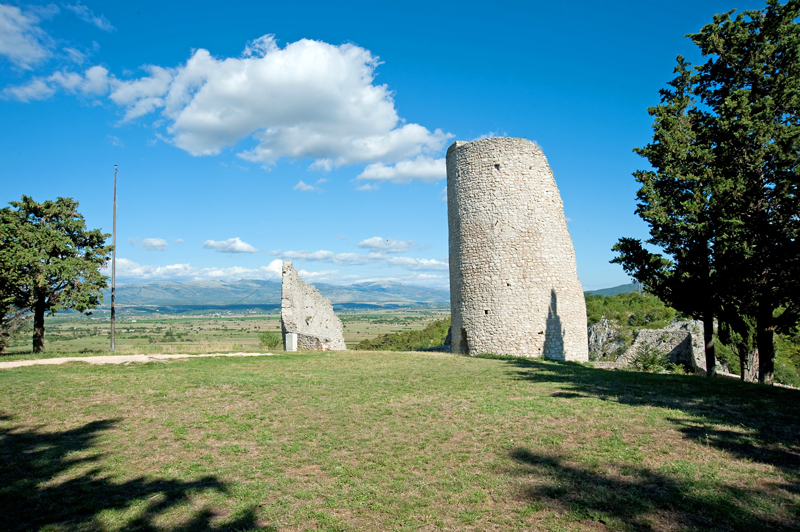
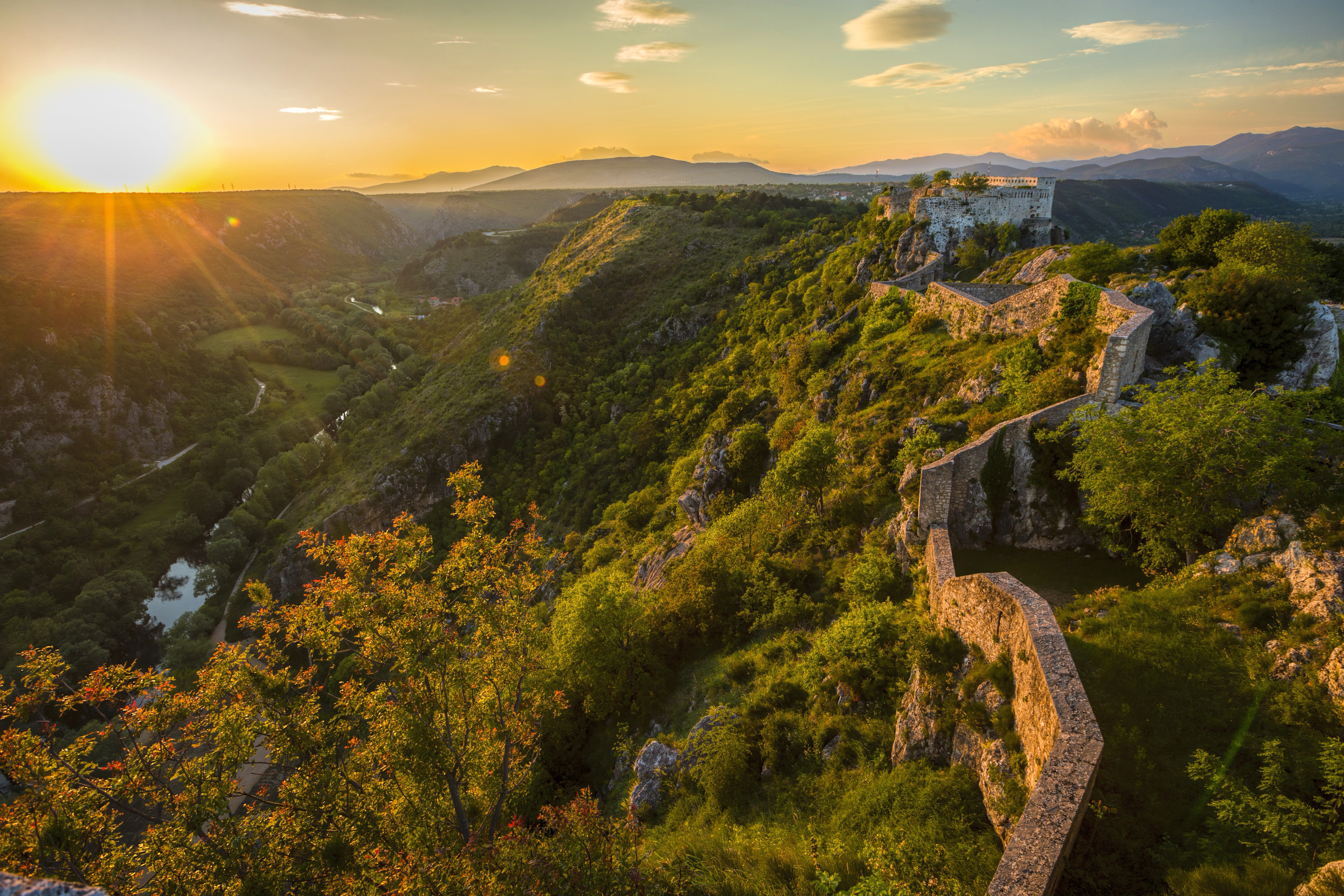

- Flag Coat of arms

- Šibenik-Knin County within Croatia
- Country: Croatia
- County seat: Šibenik

Government
  - Župan (Prefect): Paško Rakić (HDZ)
  - County Assembly: 31 members

Area
  - Total: 2,984 km^{2} (1,152 sq mi)

Population (2021)
  - Total: 96,381
  - Density: 32.30/km^{2} (83.65/sq mi)
- Area code: 022
- ISO 3166 code: HR-15
- HDI (2022): 0.853 very high · 11th
- Website: www.sibensko-kninska-zupanija.hr

Šibenik-Knin County (pronounced [ʃîbeniːk-knîːn]; Croatian: Šibensko-kninska županija [ʃîbensko-knîːnskaː ʒupǎnija]) is a county in southern Croatia, located in the north-central part of Dalmatia. The biggest city in the county is Šibenik, which also serves as the county seat. Other notable towns in the county are Knin, Vodice, Drniš and Skradin.

The county covers 2984 km^{2}. It includes 242 islands and national parks, Krka and Kornati.

== Administrative division ==
Šibenik-Knin county is administratively subdivided into:

- City of Šibenik (county seat)
- City of Knin
- Town of Drniš
- Town of Skradin
- Town of Vodice
- Municipality of Biskupija
- Municipality of Civljane
- Municipality of Ervenik
- Municipality of Kijevo
- Municipality of Kistanje
- Municipality of Murter-Kornati — Murter, the capital of the municipality
- Municipality of Pirovac
- Municipality of Primošten
- Municipality of Promina — Oklaj, the capital of the municipality
- Municipality of Rogoznica
- Municipality of Ružić — Gradac, the capital of the municipality
- Municipality of Tisno
- Municipality of Unešić
- Municipality of Bilice
- Municipality of Tribunj — founded in 2006, separated from Vodice

== County government ==
As of 2026, the Župan is Paško Rakić (HDZ), and the county assembly's 31 representatives are affiliated as follows:

Political party	Seats won	Government
Croatian Democratic Union (HDZ)	11 / 31	Government
Social Democratic Party (SDP)	6 / 31	Opposition
Independent List Stipe Petrina (NLSP)	4 / 31	Opposition
The Bridge (Most)	3 / 31	Opposition
Independent Democratic Serb Party (SDSS)	2 / 31	Opposition
Independent	2 / 31	Government support
Croatian Peasant Party (HSS)	1 / 31	Government support
Croatian Demochristian Party (HKS)	1 / 31	Government support
Homeland Movement (DP)	1 / 31	Government support

== Demographics ==
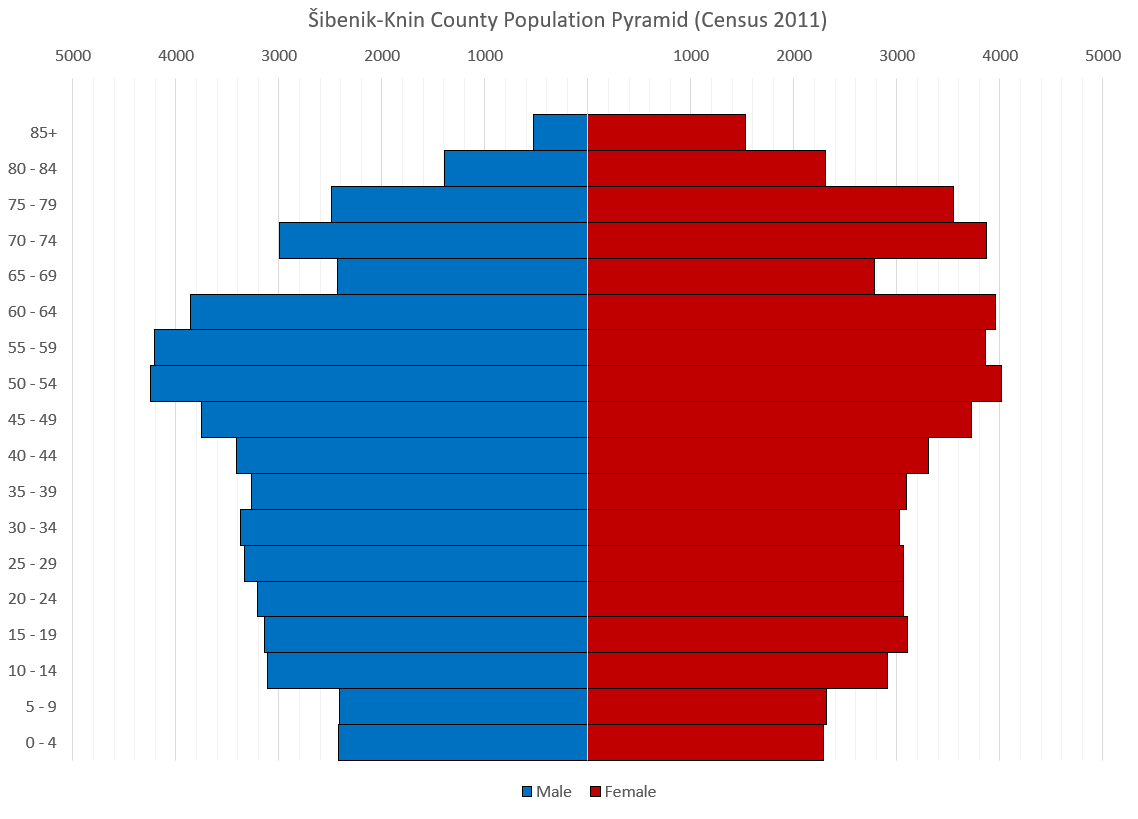
Population pyramid of Šibenik-Knin county per the 2011 Census

Historical populations of Šibenik-Knin County

Year	Pop.	±%
1857	85,163	—
1869	89,831	+5.5%
1880	92,854	+3.4%
1890	103,302	+11.3%
1900	118,310	+14.5%
1910	130,238	+10.1%
1921	134,215	+3.1%
1931	147,166	+9.6%
1948	148,360	+0.8%

Year	Pop.	±%
1953	157,405	+6.1%
1961	164,757	+4.7%
1971	161,199	−2.2%
1981	152,128	−5.6%
1991	152,477	+0.2%
2001	112,891	−26.0%
2011	109,375	−3.1%
2021	96,381	−11.9%

Source: Naselja i stanovništvo Republike Hrvatske 1857–2001, Croatian Bureau of Statistics, Zagreb, 2005

According to the 2021 census, Šibenik-Knin County has a population of 96,381. Croats make up a majority with 88,60% of the population. The Serbs are the second largest ethnic group (8,37%).

Šibenik-Knin County: Population trends 1857–2021
v

population	85163	89831	92854	103302	118310	130238	134215	147166	148360	157405	164757	161199	152128	152477	112891	109375	96381
	1857	1869	1880	1890	1900	1910	1921	1931	1948	1953	1961	1971	1981	1991	2001	2011	2021

Sources: Croatian Bureau of Statistics publications

In 1991, before the war, Croats were in majority (61,7%), with a Serb minority of 34,2%.
