= Marko Perković discography =

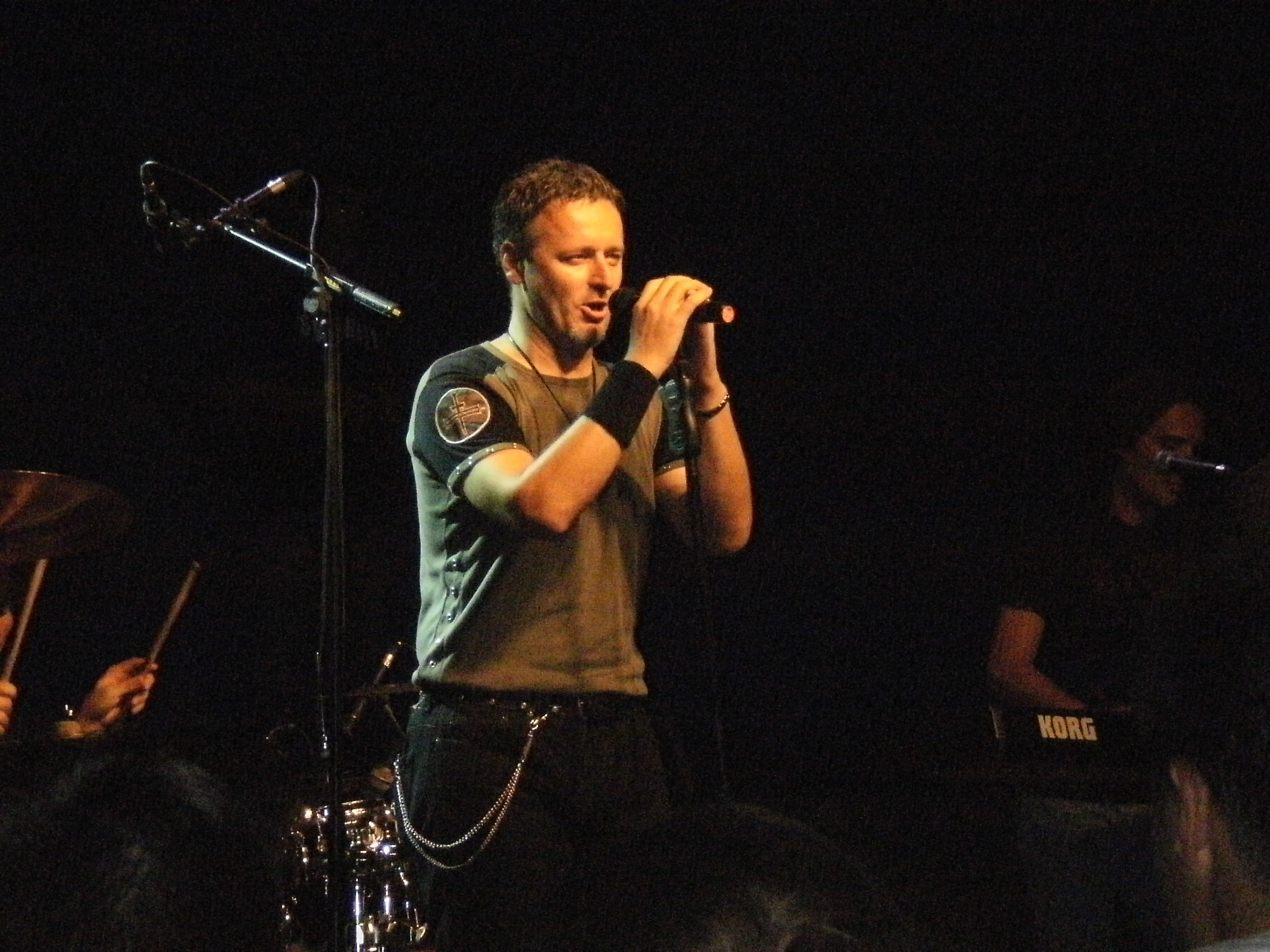
- Marko "Thompson" Perković performing in Korčula, Croatia, 2011
- Studio albums: 8
- Soundtrack albums: 1
- Live albums: 1
- Compilation albums: 4
- Singles: 27
- Video albums: 2

This is a partial discography of the Croatian rock singer-songwriter Marko "Thompson" Perković. Several of his albums and singles have topped the Croatian music charts.

== Studio albums ==
Title	Details	Peak chart positions	
Title	Details	CRO	AUT
Moli mala	Released: 1992; Formats: Cassette, CD, digital download, streaming; Label: Croatia Records	(Note: Top of the Shops was launched in 2002, but a partial archive is only available from 2006 onwards.)	—
Vrijeme škorpiona	Released: 1995; Formats: Cassette, CD, digital download, streaming; Label: Croatia Records	(Note: Top of the Shops was launched in 2002, but a partial archive is only available from 2006 onwards.)	—
Geni kameni	Released: 1996; Formats: Cassette, CD, digital download, streaming; Label: Croatia Records	(Note: Top of the Shops was launched in 2002, but a partial archive is only available from 2006 onwards.)	—
Vjetar s Dinare	Released: 1998; Formats: Cassette, CD, digital download, streaming; Label: Croatia Records	(Note: Top of the Shops was launched in 2002, but a partial archive is only available from 2006 onwards.)	—
E, moj narode	Released: 2002; Formats: Cassette, CD, digital download, streaming; Label: Croatia Records	2	—
Bilo jednom u Hrvatskoj	Released: 2006; Formats: Cassette, CD, digital download, streaming; Label: Croatia Records	1	—
Ora et labora	Released: 2013; Formats: CD, digital download, streaming; Label: Croatia Records	1	—
Hodočasnik	Released: 2025; Formats: CD, digital download, streaming; Label: Croatia Records	1	54

== Live albums ==
Title	Release date	Label
Bilo jednom u Hrvatskoj: Split – Stari plac	2007	Croatia Records

== Compilation albums ==
Title	Details	Peak chart positions
Title	Details	CRO
Sve najbolje	Released: 2003; Formats: Cassette, CD, digital download, streaming; Label: Croatia Records	—
Druga strana	Released: 2008; Formats: Cassette, CD, digital download, streaming; Label: Croatia Records	1
Best of collection	Released: 2015; Formats: CD, digital download, streaming; Label: Croatia Records	2
Antologija	Released: 2016; Formats: CD, digital download, streaming; Label: Croatia Records	1

== Singles ==
Title	Year	Peak position		Album
Title	Year	CRO	CRO Billb	Album
"Bojna Čavoglave"	1992	—N/a	(Note: Croatia Songs was launched on 15 February 2022.)	Moli mala
"Zmija me za srce ugrizla"	1992	—N/a	(Note: Croatia Songs was launched on 15 February 2022.)	Moli mala
"Anica − Kninska kraljica"	1995	—N/a	24	Vrijeme škorpiona
"Geni kameni"	1996	—N/a		Geni kameni
"Ovo mi diže tlak"	1996	—N/a		Geni kameni
"Zaustavi se vjetre"	1998	—N/a		Vjetar s Dinare
"Prijatelji"	1998	—N/a		Vjetar s Dinare
"Lijepa li si"	1998	—N/a		Vjetar s Dinare
"Iza devet sela"	2002	—N/a		E, moj narode
"Neću izdat' ja"	2002	—N/a	25	E, moj narode
"Moj Ivane"	2002	—N/a		E, moj narode
"Reci brate moj" (with Miroslav Škoro)	2002	—N/a		E, moj narode
"Stari se" (with Tiho Orlić)	2002	—N/a		E, moj narode
"Sude mi" (with Miroslav Škoro)	2003	1		Milo moje
"Tamo gdje su moji korijeni"	2006	1		Bilo jednom u Hrvatskoj
"Lipa Kaja"	2006	2		Bilo jednom u Hrvatskoj
"Moj dida i ja"	2006	1		Bilo jednom u Hrvatskoj
"Neka ni'ko ne dira u moj mali dio svemira"	2006	3	22	Bilo jednom u Hrvatskoj
"Početak"	2006	14		Bilo jednom u Hrvatskoj
"Samo je ljubav tajna dvaju svjetova"	2013	8	12	Ora et labora
"Ne boj se"	2020	6		Non-album single
"Ako ne znaš šta je bilo" (with Hrvatske Ruže)	2024	1	1	Hodočasnik
"Nepročitano pismo"	2025	18	2	Hodočasnik
"Devedeset neke"	2025	9	3	Hodočasnik
"Oluja"	2025	17	2	Hodočasnik
"Slike Bleiburga"	2025	—	14	Hodočasnik
"Preskočena crta"	2025	—	—	Hodočasnik
"—" denotes a recording that did not chart or was released before the chart was launched.

== Other charted songs ==
Title	Year	Peak chart positions		Album
Title	Year	CRO	CRO Billb.	Album
"Dolazak Hrvata"	2006	—	14	Bilo jednom u Hrvatskoj
"Kletva kralja Zvonimira"	2006	—	17	Bilo jednom u Hrvatskoj
"Ustani iz sjene"	2025	—	10	Hodočasnik
"Ravnoteža"	2025	38	3	Hodočasnik
"Kralj Tomislav"	2025	—	15	Hodočasnik
"—" denotes a recording that did not chart or was released before the chart was launched.

== Videography ==
=== Video releases ===
Title	Release date	Label
Turneja: E, moj narode	2004	Croatia Records
Turneja: Bilo jednom u Hrvatskoj Maksimir	2007	Croatia Records

=== Music videos ===
Title
Bojna Čavoglave
Dobro jutro
Lijepa li si
Moj dida i ja (2007)
Moj Ivane
Prijatelji
Reci brate moj
Tamburaška
Vjetar s Dinare
Zmija me za srce ugrizla
Stari se

== Soundtracks ==
Title	Release date	Label
Glazba iz filma Josef	2011	Croatia Records

== See also ==
- Music of Croatia
