= Druga strana =

Compilation album by Marko Perković Thompson
- Released: 20 December 2008
- Genres: Hard rock, Heavy metal, Symphonic metal, Christian rock
- Length: 59:24
- Label: Croatia Records
- Producers: Marko Perković, Tiho Orlić

Marko Perković Thompson chronology
Bilo Jednom u Hrvatskoj: Split - Stari plac (2007)	Druga strana (2008)	Ora et labora (2013)

Druga strana (Other Side) is an album by the Croatian rock singer-songwriter Marko Perković Thompson. It was released in December, 2008. The album is a compilation of re-recorded B-sides previously released by the group. Prior to its release it was known under the working title B strana.

== Tracks ==
No.	Title	Length
1.	"Bojna Čavoglave" (Čavoglave Battalion)	5:30
2.	"Prognanička (Moj grad)" (Exile song (My city))	4:20
3.	"Sjećaš li se, draga (Ljutu travu na ljutu ranu)" (Do you remember, dear (A sour herb [remedy] on a sour wound))	5:36
4.	"Anica − Kninska kraljica" (Annie – queen of Knin)	4:54
5.	"Moli mala" (Pray, little one)	5:18
6.	"Rosa" (Dew)	4:15
7.	"Ka bez duše" (Without a soul)	4:19
8.	"Tamburaška" (Tambura song)	3:53
9.	"Poljubi me" (Kiss me)	3:32
10.	"Zmija me za srce ugrizla" (A snake bit me in my heart)	3:30
11.	"Volim te" (I love you)	3:39
12.	"Ima nešto vrjednije od zlata" (There's something worth more than gold)	4:40
13.	"Ivane Pavle II" (John Paul II)	5:04
14.	"Lijepa li si (orchestral version)" (You are beautiful)	5:18
Total length:		59:24
