= List of number-one albums of 2025 (Croatia) =

This is a list of the albums ranked number one in Croatia during 2025. The top-performing albums and EPs in Croatia are ranked on the Top lista chart, which is published by the Croatian Phonographic Association. The data is compiled from 164 record-selling locations and online stores provided by music labels. The chart is based on the physical and digital sales of albums in Croatia and does not include album-equivalent units. Two separate album charts are published: one for domestic artists, which includes all albums released by Croatian labels, and another for international artists, which features albums published by foreign labels.

== Number-one albums by week ==
Issue date	Domestic Album	Artist	Ref.	International Album	Artist	Ref.
5 January	Dnevnik velikog Perice	Various artists		Rome	The National	
12 January	Male stvari	Elemental		Rome	The National	
19 January	Spašavanje turista u japankama na Biokovu	Banda turizma		The Human Fear	Franz Ferdinand	
26 January	FM/AM	Pavel		Rome	The National	
2 February	Tajni grad	Haustor		Rome	The National	
9 February	Dmns & Mosquitoes	Baby Lasagna		Rome	The National	
16 February	Dmns & Mosquitoes	Baby Lasagna		Teenager of the Year	Frank Black	
23 February	Motori	Divlje Jagode		I've Tried Everything but Therapy (Part 2)	Teddy Swims	
2 March	Do zvijezda	Chui		I've Tried Everything but Therapy (Part 2)	Teddy Swims	
9 March	Jedinstvo	Kalikamo		Romance	Fontaines D.C.	
16 March	Jedinstvo	Kalikamo		Mayhem	Lady Gaga	
23 March	Dnevnik velikog Perice	Various artists		Mayhem	Lady Gaga	
30 March	Do zvijezda	Chui		Mayhem	Lady Gaga	
6 April	Dugopolje (Live 2024)	Marko Perković Thompson		Romance	Fontaines D.C.	
13 April	Ruža vjetrova	Gibonni		"Fortnight"	Taylor Swift featuring Post Malone	
20 April	III	Artan Lili		Romance	Fontaines D.C.	
27 April	Igra	Meritas		In Rainbows	Radiohead	
4 May	Mi	Dino Merlin		Romance	Fontaines D.C.	
11 May	Mi	Dino Merlin		Pink Floyd at Pompeii – MCMLXXII	Pink Floyd	
18 May	Zagreb Rap Demo (1985–1992)	Various artists		Romance	Fontaines D.C.	
25 May	Zagreb Rap Demo (1985–1992)	Various artists		Bleach	Nirvana	
1 June	Zagreb Rap Demo (1985–1992)	Various artists		From Zero	Linkin Park	
8 June	Brze suze	Nika Turković		From Zero	Linkin Park	
15 June	Hodočasnik	Marko Perković Thompson		More	Pulp	
22 June	Hodočasnik	Marko Perković Thompson		More	Pulp	
29 June	Hodočasnik	Marko Perković Thompson		Talkin to the Trees	Neil Young and the Chrome Hearts	
6 July	Hodočasnik	Marko Perković Thompson		More	Pulp	
13 July	Hodočasnik	Marko Perković Thompson		More	Pulp	
20 July	Hodočasnik	Marko Perković Thompson		Moisturizer	Wet Leg	
27 July	Hodočasnik	Marko Perković Thompson		Moisturizer	Wet Leg	
3 August	Odlaziš	Oliver Dragojević		Veronica Electronica	Madonna	
10 August	Hodočasnik	Marko Perković Thompson		No Rain, No Flowers	The Black Keys	
17 August	Hodočasnik	Marko Perković Thompson		No Rain, No Flowers	The Black Keys	
24 August	Hodočasnik	Marko Perković Thompson		Raise the Pressure	Electronic	
31 August	Hodočasnik	Marko Perković Thompson		Private Music	Deftones	
7 September	Hodočasnik	Marko Perković Thompson		Private Music	Deftones	
14 September	Mirakul	Gibonni		Breach	Twenty One Pilots	
21 September	Mirakul	Gibonni		Altar	NewDad	
28 September	Mirakul	Gibonni		Saving Grace	Robert Plant with Suzi Dian	
5 October	Mirakul	Gibonni		Mi smo ovdje samo zbog para	KUD Idijoti	
12 October	Mirakul	Gibonni		The Life of a Showgirl	Taylor Swift	
19 October	Istočno od Gajnica	Hladno Pivo		Mi smo ovdje samo zbog para	KUD Idijoti	
26 October	Lutanja u snu	Mayales		Smoochies	Ashnikko	
2 November	Istočno od Gajnica	Hladno Pivo		Smoochies	Ashnikko	

== See also ==
- List of Croatian airplay number-one songs of 2025
- List of number-one singles of 2025 (Croatia)
