= List of Croatian airplay number-one songs of 2025 =

This is a list of songs that reached number one on the airplay charts in Croatia in 2025. The HR Top 100 and Airplay Radio Chart are published weekly by Top lista and rank the 100 most-played songs in the country. The HR Top 100 focuses on Croatian songs, while the Airplay Radio Chart ranks the most popular international tracks.

== Chart history ==
| Issue date | Domestic Song | Artist | Ref. | International Song | Artist | Ref. |
|---|---|---|---|---|---|---|
| 6 January | — | — | — | "Die with a Smile" | Lady Gaga and Bruno Mars | |
| 13 January | "Anđeo" | Hiljson Mandela and Miach | | "Bad Dreams" | Teddy Swims | |
| 20 January | "Anđeo" | Hiljson Mandela and Miach | | "Bad Dreams" | Teddy Swims | |
| 27 January | "Anđeo" | Hiljson Mandela and Miach | | "Bad Dreams" | Teddy Swims | |
| 3 February | "Anđeo" | Hiljson Mandela and Miach | | "Messy" | Lola Young | |
| 10 February | "Ako ne znaš šta je bilo" | Marko Perković Thompson and Hrvatske Ruže | | "Bad Dreams" | Teddy Swims | |
| 17 February | "Anđeo" | Hiljson Mandela and Miach | | "Die with a Smile" | Lady Gaga and Bruno Mars | |
| 24 February | "Anđeo" | Hiljson Mandela and Miach | | "Abracadabra" | Lady Gaga | |
| 3 March | "Anđeo" | Hiljson Mandela and Miach | | "Abracadabra" | Lady Gaga | |
| 10 March | "Poison Cake" | Marko Bošnjak | | "Abracadabra" | Lady Gaga | |
| 17 March | "Anđeo" | Hiljson Mandela and Miach | | "Abracadabra" | Lady Gaga | |
| 24 March | "Moje" | Matija Cvek and the Funkensteins | | "Abracadabra" | Lady Gaga | |
| 31 March | "Moje" | Matija Cvek and the Funkensteins | | "Abracadabra" | Lady Gaga | |
| 7 April | "Moje" | Matija Cvek and the Funkensteins | | "Abracadabra" | Lady Gaga | |
| 14 April | "Moje" | Matija Cvek and the Funkensteins | | "Abracadabra" | Lady Gaga | |
| 21 April | "Ti si bila moje sunce" | Martin Kosovec | | "Azizam" | Ed Sheeran | |
| 28 April | "Ti si bila moje sunce" | Martin Kosovec | | "Azizam" | Ed Sheeran | |
| 5 May | "Ti si bila moje sunce" | Martin Kosovec | | "Azizam" | Ed Sheeran | |
| 12 May | "Ti si bila moje sunce" | Martin Kosovec | | "Azizam" | Ed Sheeran | |
| 19 May | "Ti si bila moje sunce" | Martin Kosovec | | "Azizam" | Ed Sheeran | |
| 26 May | "Ti si bila moje sunce" | Martin Kosovec | | "Azizam" | Ed Sheeran | |
| 2 June | "Ti si bila moje sunce" | Martin Kosovec | | "Azizam" | Ed Sheeran | |
| 9 June | "Ti si bila moje sunce" | Martin Kosovec | | "Azizam" | Ed Sheeran | |
| 16 June | "Ti si bila moje sunce" | Martin Kosovec | | "Azizam" | Ed Sheeran | |
| 23 June | "Ti si bila moje sunce" | Martin Kosovec | | "Azizam" (Persian version) | Ed Sheeran featuring Googoosh | |
| 30 June | "Ti si bila moje sunce" | Martin Kosovec | | "Azizam" (Persian version) | Ed Sheeran featuring Googoosh | |
| 7 July | "Ti si bila moje sunce" | Martin Kosovec | | "Sapphire" | Ed Sheeran | |
| 14 July | "Atlas" | Martin Kosovec | | "Sapphire" | Ed Sheeran | |
| 21 July | "Atlas" | Martin Kosovec | | "Sapphire" | Ed Sheeran | |
| 28 July | "Alive" | Nina Badrić | | "Sapphire" | Ed Sheeran | |
| 4 August | "Atlas" | Martin Kosovec | | "Sapphire" | Ed Sheeran | |
| 11 August | "Alive" | Nina Badrić | | "Sapphire" | Ed Sheeran | |
| 18 August | "Alive" | Nina Badrić | | "Sapphire" | Ed Sheeran | |
| 25 August | "Alive" | Nina Badrić | | "Sapphire" | Ed Sheeran | |
| 1 September | "Alive" | Nina Badrić | | "Sapphire" | Ed Sheeran | |
| 8 September | "Alive" | Nina Badrić | | "Sapphire" | Ed Sheeran | |
| 15 September | "Alive" | Nina Badrić | | "Sapphire" | Ed Sheeran | |
| 22 September | "Alive" | Nina Badrić | | "Sapphire" | Ed Sheeran | |
| 29 September | "Oprosti" | Igor Delač | | "The Dead Dance" | Lady Gaga | |
| 6 October | "Oprosti" | Igor Delač | | "The Dead Dance" | Lady Gaga | |
| 13 October | "Doživotno" | Vatra featuring Detour, Pavel and Mayales | | "The Dead Dance" | Lady Gaga | |
| 20 October | "Doživotno" | Vatra featuring Detour, Pavel and Mayales | | "The Dead Dance" | Lady Gaga | |
| 27 October | "Doživotno" | Vatra featuring Detour, Pavel and Mayales | | "The Dead Dance" | Lady Gaga | |
| 3 November | "Doživotno" | Vatra featuring Detour, Pavel and Mayales | | "The Dead Dance" | Lady Gaga | |
| 10 November | "Potpišimo neriješeno" | Izgubljeni Vikend featuring Neno Belan | | "The Dead Dance" | Lady Gaga | |

== See also ==
- List of number-one albums of 2025 (Croatia)
- List of number-one singles of 2025 (Croatia)
