= List of number-one singles of 2025 (Croatia) =

This is a list of the Croatian number-one singles of 2025 as compiled by Croatia Songs, part of Hits of the World Billboard chart series, provided by Billboard.

Number-one singles, showing issue date, song and artist names
No.	Issue date	Song	Artist(s)	Ref.
39	4 January 2025	"Bass"	Jala Brat and Buba Corelli	
re	11 January 2025	"Anđeo"	Hiljson Mandela and Miach	
re	18 January 2025	"Anđeo"	Hiljson Mandela and Miach	
re	25 January 2025	"Anđeo"	Hiljson Mandela and Miach	
re	1 February 2025	"Anđeo"	Hiljson Mandela and Miach	
re	8 February 2025	"Anđeo"	Hiljson Mandela and Miach	
40	15 February 2025	"Ako ne znaš šta je bilo"	Marko Perković Thompson and Hrvatske Ruže	
40	22 February 2025	"Ako ne znaš šta je bilo"	Marko Perković Thompson and Hrvatske Ruže	
40	1 March 2025	"Ako ne znaš šta je bilo"	Marko Perković Thompson and Hrvatske Ruže	
re	8 March 2025	"Anđeo"	Hiljson Mandela and Miach	
re	15 March 2025	"Anđeo"	Hiljson Mandela and Miach	
re	22 March 2025	"Anđeo"	Hiljson Mandela and Miach	
re	29 March 2025	"Anđeo"	Hiljson Mandela and Miach	
re	5 April 2025	"Blaka, blaka"	Jala Brat and Buba Corelli featuring Elena	
re	12 April 2025	"Ako ne znaš šta je bilo"	Marko Perković Thompson and Hrvatske Ruže	
41	19 April 2025	"Tajland"	Rasta	
41	26 April 2025	"Tajland"	Rasta	
41	3 May 2025	"Tajland"	Rasta	
41	10 May 2025	"Tajland"	Rasta	
41	17 May 2025	"Tajland"	Rasta	
42	24 May 2025	"Abu Dhabi"	Grše	
43	31 May 2025	"Cchap cchap"	Desingerica	
43	7 June 2025	"Cchap cchap"	Desingerica	
43	14 June 2025	"Cchap cchap"	Desingerica	
44	21 June 2025	"TEC-9"	Jala Brat and Buba Corelli	
44	28 June 2025	"TEC-9"	Jala Brat and Buba Corelli	
44	5 July 2025	"TEC-9"	Jala Brat and Buba Corelli	
44	12 July 2025	"TEC-9"	Jala Brat and Buba Corelli	
44	19 July 2025	"TEC-9"	Jala Brat and Buba Corelli	
44	26 July 2025	"TEC-9"	Jala Brat and Buba Corelli	
44	2 August 2025	"TEC-9"	Jala Brat and Buba Corelli	
44	9 August 2025	"TEC-9"	Jala Brat and Buba Corelli	
44	16 August 2025	"TEC-9"	Jala Brat and Buba Corelli	
44	23 August 2025	"TEC-9"	Jala Brat and Buba Corelli	
44	30 August 2025	"TEC-9"	Jala Brat and Buba Corelli	
44	6 September 2025	"TEC-9"	Jala Brat and Buba Corelli	
44	13 September 2025	"TEC-9"	Jala Brat and Buba Corelli	
44	20 September 2025	"TEC-9"	Jala Brat and Buba Corelli	
44	27 September 2025	"TEC-9"	Jala Brat and Buba Corelli	
44	4 October 2025	"TEC-9"	Jala Brat and Buba Corelli	
45	11 October 2025	"MDMA"	Nikolija and Biba	
45	18 October 2025	"MDMA"	Nikolija and Biba	
45	25 October 2025	"MDMA"	Nikolija and Biba	
45	1 November 2025	"MDMA"	Nikolija and Biba	
45	8 November 2025	"MDMA"	Nikolija and Biba	
re	15 November 2025	"TEC-9"	Jala Brat and Buba Corelli	
re	22 November 2025	"TEC-9"	Jala Brat and Buba Corelli	
46	29 November 2025	"Hilton Hotel Barça"	Nucci	
47	6 December 2025	"Polje ruža"	Jakov Jozinović	
48	13 December 2025	"Terca na tišinu"	Silente	
48	20 December 2025	"Terca na tišinu"	Silente	
48	27 December 2025	"Terca na tišinu"	Silente	

== Number-one artists of 2025 ==
List of number-one artists by total weeks at number one
Position	Artist	Weeks at No. 1
1	Buba Corelli	20
1	Jala Brat	20
3	Hiljson Mandela	9
3	Miach	9
5	Biba	5
5	Nikolija	5
5	Rasta	5
8	Hrvatske Ruže	4
8	Marko Perković Thompson	4
10	Desingerica	3
10	Silente	3
12	Elena	1
12	Grše	1
12	Jakov Jozinović	1
12	Nucci	1

== See also ==
- List of Croatian airplay number-one songs of 2025
- List of number-one albums of 2025 (Croatia)
