= Moli mala =

Studio album by Marko Perković Thompson
- Released: 1992
- Genre: Pop rock
- Length: 52:31
- Label: Croatia Records
- Producer: Tonči Huljić

Marko Perković Thompson chronology
Moli mala (1992)	Vrijeme škorpiona (1995)

Moli mala is the first album by the Croatian musician Marko Perković Thompson, released in 1992. Danijela Martinović sang on the album as a guest for "Potonut ću". Zdenko Runjić composed the song "Grkinja". Thompson performed the album's eponymous track at the Skalinada festival in Split.

== Track listing ==
1. "Zmija me za srce ugrizla" (A snake bit my heart) (writing: Ž. Dundić, K. Crnogorac) (3:09)
2. "Grkinja" (Greek woman) (writing: Z. Runjić) (2:54)
3. "Potonut ću" (I'll drown) (writing: T. Huljić, V. Huljić) (4:02)
4. "Naša prva noć" (Our first night) (writing: M. Perković) (4:05)
5. "Anđelina" (Angelina) (writing: M. Perković) (3:30)
6. "Na ples" (To the dance) (writing: M. Perković) (3:39)
7. "Moli mala" (Pray, baby) (writing: M. Perković) (5:07)
8. "Jer, Hrvati smo" (Because we are Croats) (writing: M. Perković) (4:07)
9. "Bojna – Čavoglave [remix]" (Čavoglave bataillon) (writing: M. Perković) (3:37)
10. "Varala se mala" (She was wrong) (writing: M. Perković) (3:48)
11. "Ela" (writing: M. Perković) (3:28)
12. "Smišnica" (writing: M. Perković) (3:07)
13. "Budi uz mene" (Stand by me) (writing: M. Perković) (3:31)
14. "Ja ću poći ove noći" (I will leave tonight) (writing: M. Perković) (4:59)
