= United Against Fascism Marches =

2025 protests in Croatia

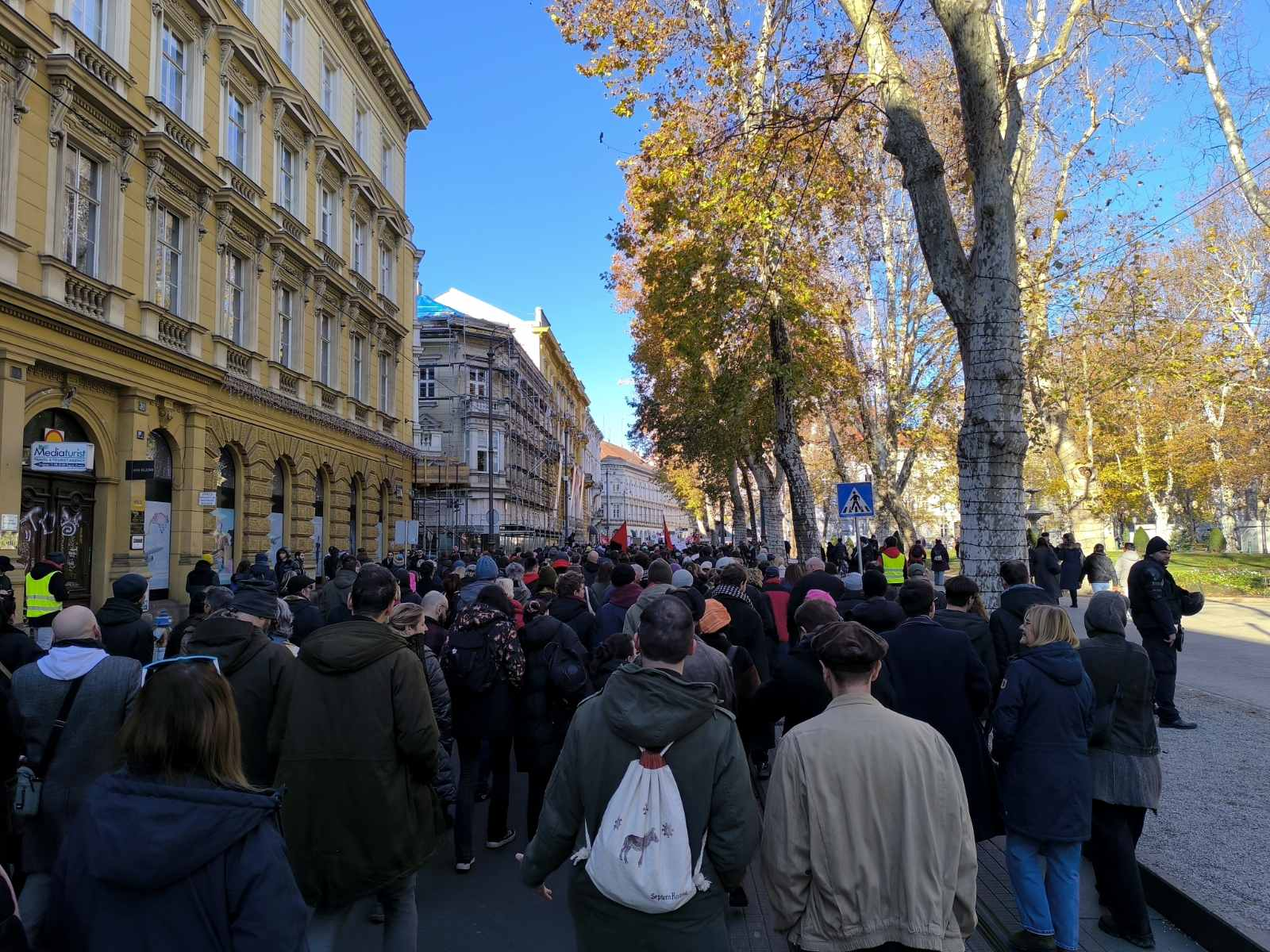
- Anti-fascist protesters in Zagreb
- Date: 30 November 2025
- Location: Zagreb, Rijeka, Pula, Zadar
- Caused by: 3 November 2025 violent disruption of Serbian Culture Day in Split; 7 November 2025 attack on Serb cultural center in Zagreb; 9 November 2025 attack on Serbian karate team in Rijeka; Attack on Dalmatian school children visiting Zagreb book fair Interliber; Usage of fascist Za dom spremni slogan in Croatian Parliament; Historical revisionism related to Independent State of Croatia; negationism of mass murders committed in Jasenovac concentration camp
- Methods: Demonstrations

Parties
United Against Fascism Initiative	masked counter protesters

Lead figures
no centralised leadership	

Number
Zagreb - around 10 000 people Rijeka - around 1 000 protesters Pula - around 1 000 protesters Zadar between 300 and 500 protesters	Around 40 counter protesters in Rijeka.

Casualties and losses
One child injured in Rijeka as a result of firecracker attacks.	

United Against Fascism Marches (Croatian: Marševi ujedinjeni protiv fašizma) were antifascist marches held in Croatian cities of: Zagreb, Zadar, Rijeka and Pula in the response to far right surge in the country, which was accompanied by a series of violent incidents.

== Background ==
After the 2024 Croatian parliamentary election, no party held an outright majority of the seats in the Sabor. The party with the most seats was the main Croatian conservative party, the Croatian Democratic Union. They formed a governing coalition with the new far-right Homeland Movement party. One of the conditions from the Homeland Movement party was that no party representing the Serb minority be included in the government.

The rise of both a far-right government and anti-Serb sentiment represented a rightward shift in Croatian politics. However, Prime Minister Andrej Plenković has dismissed concerns about rises in far-right extremism and neo-fascist hate speech since then.

=== Thompson's concert in Zagreb ===
Significant examples of the rightward drift in rhetoric and symbolism included a July 2025 concert from Croatian right wing singer Marko "Thompson" Perković in the Croatian capital city, Zagreb, which organizers said was attended by approximately 500,000 people. Both domestic and international news coverage of the concert showed attendees performing pro-Nazi and pro-Ustaše salutes, which are normally punishable by Croatian law.

Before the concert began, Thompson fans around Zagreb sang songs celebrating the Ustaše and crimes against humanity during World War II. These included "Evo zore, evo dana", (Note: Roughly translated as "Here's the dawn, here's the day", this song dates from World War II, and praises the Black Legion of the Ustaše, and its leaders, Jure Francetić and Rafael Boban.) and "Jasenovac i Gradiška Stara". (Note: This is a modern song praising the Jasenovac and Gradiška Stara concentration camps run by the Ustase and that were used in the Holocaust in Croatia and genocide of Serbs in Croatia during World War II.) Thompson himself opened his song "Bojna Čavoglave" with the Ustaše war cry Za dom spremni ("For the homeland - ready!").

When the concert was over, Croatian minister of interior Davor Božinović published a video on TikTok in which he appeared in a black shirt, one of the and described the concert as: "a rarely seen spectacle". Defense minister Ivan Anušić confessed to the media that during the concert he responded to Thompson's Za dom spremni salute. In the days which followed the concert, Croatian MPs continued to use the salute during Croatian parliament sessions.

In the aftermath of the concert, Croatia's Ombudsperson criticized not only the concert-goers who engaged in the salutes but also the organizers and authorities for not denouncing the pro-Ustase messaging of the concert. Former Croatian Prime Minister Jadranka Kosor and civil rights activists also expressed their concerns about the lack of governmental or media response to the concert.

=== Disruption of cultural events, resurgence of commemorative events ===
In late August 2025, a group of Croatian war veterans prevented the cultural festival in Benkovac, while also insulting and attacking journalist Melita Vrsaljko. According to Vrsaljko, police officers greeted the veterans amicably despite the attack and failed to protect her when one of them struck her. When the veterans blocked access to her car, police refused to allow her to reach it, forcing her to call her parents to retrieve the vehicle; they, too, were insulted by the veterans as they passed. Few days later, another group of veterans attempted to prevent the Fališ cultural festival in Šibenik.

In October 2025, the Croatian parliament hosted a round table which downplayed the number of victims of the World War II era Jasenovac concentration camp. On the round table, one of the main speakers was Igor Vukić who claimed on the round table that: "Jasenovac was a work camp, but not a torture house or a death camp".

On 3 November 2025 some 70 masked individuals burst into the building where the Days of Serb culture in Split were held and illegally cancelled it. On 7 November 2025 masked hooligans attempted to prevent an exhibition dedicated to legacy of Dejan Medaković in Serb Cultural Center in Zagreb. They sang songs celebrating the Independent State of Croatia (the pro-Nazi puppet state run by the Ustaše during WWII), insulted and spat on journalists, and gave roman salutes before being chased away by the police. On 9 November a group of masked and armed hooligans attempted to attack Serb teenage karate team in Rijeka.

On 29 November 2025, members of the far-right Autochthonous Croatian Party of Rights protested in front of the apartment of Croatian center-left politician and parliamentarian Dalija Orešković. The protest leader Dražen Keleminec labelled Orešković "a Yugoslav" and accused her of attacking war veteran and singer Marko Perković Thompson, denouncing the wartime salute "Za dom spremni," and of other comments about war, nationalism, and history. Tomo Medved, Croatia's Deputy Prime Minister and Minister for Veterans commented on the protest by saying that said Orešković "should tone down" what he described as her aggressive public rhetoric — arguing that many war veterans and others expressed dissatisfaction with her stance on the Homeland War and related issues.

== The march ==
On 19 November 2025, "United Against Fascism" initiative has announced that they will organize a protest march under the same on Sunday, 30 November 2025. In their announcement, they claimed that march is a direct response to: the growing presence of hate speech, increasingly open displays of fascist symbolism, recent violent incidents, threats directed at cultural, minority and civic organisations, and what they described as a worrying "normalisation of intimidation."

You set off with your school from Zadar to Zagreb for the Interliber book fair? Think twice. You're from Serbia, do folklore dancing, and are practicing for a performance in Split or the Balkan Karate Championship in Rijeka? Don't bother.

You're organizing a summer literary festival, but didn't consult the local veterans' association? Give the money back. In today's Croatia, more and more people are becoming a "threat." Are you next?

Fascist symbols appear on the streets every day—there isn't a school or kindergarten in Rijeka whose walls aren't defaced with swastikas and the Ustaše "U". From concerts to the Parliament, the ZDS slogan echoes—fascists are no longer ashamed nor are they hiding.

Cultural programs are declared hostile acts, people walk the streets with a growing sense of insecurity, Ustašism and fascism are being relativized, and tensions are rising. And while the Government's decisions have directly enabled the "prohibitive summer" to spill over into a violent autumn, most people have had enough. - an official invitation to the march

=== Zagreb ===
The march in Zagreb gathered some 10,000 protesters who marched from King Tomislav Square to Ban Jelačić Square, where several speakers such as: actor Damir Markovina, writer Olja Savičević Ivančević, student Eva Marija Jurešić and cultural worker and activist Franka de Syo held their speeches. The organizer Marija Mileta subsequently stated that the organizers anticipated around 500 protesters and were surprised by the number of 10,000 people.

=== Zadar ===
In Zadar, hundreds of people joined the antifascist march on Obala kneza Branimira. The protest began peacefully and organized, however, shortly after the march began, a masked duo on a motorboat threw red paint at the protesters. As the column reached the city, several dozen counter-protesters, including members of the Homeland War Women's Association, confronted them. A group of masked men shouted insults and approached the march physically, but police intervened, using restraint and irritant spray.

=== Rijeka ===
In Rijeka, the antifascist protesters were attacked by a group of about thirty masked men in black who threw firecrackers at participants before the march even started at Jadranski trg. After the march, in the Štriga café, masked individuals threw flares, injuring one person in the back.

=== Pula ===
In Pula on November 30, 2025, citizens gathered at Rojc Center and set off at noon for a march under the common banner "United Against Fascism". The march proceeded peacefully, passing through Monte Zaro toward the city market, with demonstrators carrying banners such as "Freedom is stronger than fear" and "Fascists are parasites of society." According to organizers, about 1,530 people participated.

== Ramifications ==
Following the protest in Rijeka, the organizers announced their intention to file a complaint against the local police, alleging that authorities allowed an unpermitted gathering of counter-protesters and failed to adequately protect participants. The police later reported that they arrested 5 individuals for attacking the antifascists. Police also reported that one of individuals arrested in Rijeka was a 21-year-old citizen of Russia. Croatian web site Index.hr reported that man posed on his Facebook profile in Armada ultras group symbols while making a roman salute.

=== Court Ruling on the Rijeka Incidents ===
In January 2026, The Municipal Court in Rijeka concluded that group of attackers deliberately approached the protest with the intent to intimidate participants. They shouted slogans associated with the Ustaša movement and the World War II–era Independent State of Croatia (NDH), including "Za dom spremni", and performed gestures interpreted as fascist salutes. One protest participant was physically assaulted, while others were verbally harassed. The six adults were fined a total of €21,315, with several receiving near-maximum penalties under public order laws. The minor received educational measures, including a temporary ban from attending football matches and mandatory counseling. In its ruling, the court emphasized that Za dom spremni was an official salute of the Ustaša regime, which it described as a fascist and totalitarian state responsible for crimes against humanity, and concluded that its public use constitutes intimidation and a disturbance of public peace.

=== Counter-protests ===
On 10 December 2025, a group of Croatian war veterans held a protest in Vinkovci under the slogan "Five to Twelve for the Homeland." The organizers claimed that anti-fascist marches were an attempt to "publicly shame Croatia" and to relativize or undermine the values of the Homeland War. They objected especially to the presence of symbols such as the red star, which they described as a symbol of death in Vukovar, and to the appearance of Cyrillic signs. Veterans' representatives argued that some slogans heard at the anti-fascist marches amounted not to protest but to "criminal acts," including alleged calls to overthrow the constitutional order. They warned about what they called the rise of "left-wing nationalism" in Croatia and urged state institutions to protect the Constitution and the values it promotes.

=== Counter-petitions ===
On 10 December 2025, Homeland Movement's Youth started an on-line petition to "remove gay prides and antifa marches from the centers of Croatian cities." Their petition states: "Since a radically left-wing petition aims to remove prayer groups from public squares in Croatian city centers, we believe the same should apply to all leftist and 'human-rights' gatherings, because the Republic of Croatia guarantees an equal level of rights to all its citizens."

=== Persecution of organizers ===
In April 2026, the Croatian Ministry of the Interior initiated a misdemeanor proceeding against Marija Mileta, the organizer of an anti-fascist march held in Zagreb. Authorities alleged that, as the organizer of a public assembly, she failed to ensure public order due to the display of several banners during the protest. These included slogans such as "If you are afraid of the dark, we will set the city on fire," "Balkan federation without states and nations," and "Intifada until victory," as well as a banner featuring the hammer and sickle symbol. Mileta rejected the accusations, describing the charges as unfounded and politically motivated. She argued that the protest, which gathered more than 10,000 participants, proceeded peacefully and without incidents, and that the banners represented political expression rather than incitement to violence. The case was brought before the Municipal Misdemeanor Court in Zagreb, where proceedings began in April 2026. The Office of the Ombudsperson announced that it was monitoring the proceedings, emphasizing that the right to public assembly is guaranteed by the Constitution, international treaties, and national legislation, and noting that the issue remained a significant topic in 2025 and beyond. In July 2026, the Municipal Misdemeanor Court in Zagreb acquitted Marija Mileta of all charges. Judge Tonka Grgičević ruled that the controversial banners did not incite violence or pose a real threat, emphasizing that freedom of assembly and expression are fundamental constitutional values protected in a democratic society. Following Mileta's acquittal, her legal counsel, Lina Budak, became the target of anonymous threats. Between 8 and 12 July 2026, an anonymous letter was left in the mailbox of Budak's law office. The letter, signed by "Ustaše" and concluding with the fascist salute "Za dom spremni", was dated 5 July 2026 (marked by the sender as the anniversary of a concert by the nationalist singer Marko Perković Thompson). It contained vulgar insults and explicit threats directed at Budak and Mileta, explicitly referencing Budak's successful defense of Mileta. The text also targeted the weekly magazine Novosti and politician Milorad Pupovac, both of whom Budak represents as legal counsel. Budak officially reported the incident to the Minister of the Interior, Davor Božinović, noting that she had filed a similar threat report in July 2025 without receiving updates on the investigation. In her public letter, Budak criticized state authorities for tolerating Ustaše symbols under the guise of "dual connotations," arguing that institutional passivity encourages vigilantism against civic actors and compromises the constitutional independence of the legal profession.

=== Public recognition of organizers ===
In June 2025, Marija Mileta, serving as an organizer and public representative of the United Against Fascism Initiative, was presented with the prestigious Nada Dimić Award (Nagrada "Nada Dimić). The award is presented annually by the *Fund for Others* (*Fond za druge*) to individuals and initiatives demonstrating exceptional civic courage, resistance to oppression, and promotion of freedom of expression. The jury honored Mileta and her collective for successfully organizing multi-city mobilization across Croatia, recognizing their decisive civil response to rising right-wing extremism, cultural censorship, and violence in the public sphere.

== Reactions ==
- Prime minister Andrej Plenković called the protest a "fabricated thesis," arguing that it was in reality an event orchestrated by the radical left to promote ideological division and accused its organizers of trying to destabilize the government.
- Croatian defense minister Ivan Anušić said that the protests organised by United Against Fascism Initiative were not truly antifascist, but rather "against Croatia" and "pro‑Yugoslav". His statement, however, was sharply criticized by sociologist and political scientiet Dražen Lalić, who responded that: "Anušić insulted him and his friends" and that "even in the age of 65 [he] would take machine gun in his hands and defend Croatia." He went on to say that Anušić is: "either ignorant, or his agenda is not democratic."
- Ivica Kukavica, a member of the ruling coalition Homeland Movement, described the march as "the greatest provocation by so-called antifascists since the Homeland War." He added that "the insignia seen at the protest were also worn by the aggressors during the Homeland War [...] The black flag with a skull, which we also saw at the protest, was carried by Chetniks as they entered Vukovar in 1991". However, the Croatian daily Večernji list later clarified that the black flag with a skull seen at the protest was not a chetnik flag, but that of Japanese manga series One Piece popular among Generation Z.
- Mayor of Zagreb Tomislav Tomašević said that he supports the protest due to the rise of right-wing extremism, which is also noted in the SOA intelligence report, and emphasized that there has been no violence from left-wing extremists in Croatia. He explained that he did not attend the protest because, given the current social climate, his presence might have been misinterpreted as suggesting that the city government had organized the event.
- “The Croatian war veterans' association HVIDR-a strongly condemned the marches 'United Against Fascism', calling the participants 'fake antifashists' and urged the authorities to clarify whether there were elements of criminal acts promoting symbols of the former totalitarian communist-fascist state. They argued that the messages and iconography seen at the protests evoke painful memories tied to symbols under which Croatia suffered during past regimes.

=== Disinformation about the protest ===
News site Narodno.hr published an article suggesting that some 15 buses with Serbian and Bosnian licence plates transported people with banners which were later seen at the protest in Zagreb. This was refuted by the fact checking site Faktograf.hr which contacted both protest organizers and Croatian border police to check the claim.
