= Detcom =

- Born: Daniel Detcom; November 17, 1989 (age 36); Kharkiv, Ukraine
- Origin: Kyiv, Ukraine
- Genres: Techno, Synthwave
- Occupations: Disc jockey, Record producer, Singer, Military serviceman, War veteran, Public activist
- Years active: 2007–present
- Labels: Planet Rhythm, Krill Music, Detcave
- Past members: Ahquick!, Olegolize
- Website: detcom.party

Daniel Detcom (born 17 November 1989) is a Ukrainian techno DJ, music producer, and soldier. He rose in Kyiv's electronic music scene in end 2000's - mid 2010's as DJ Mindfreak, playing hardcore technoand drum and bass, switching to alias Detcom in 2015, organizing events such as Dots and collaborating with platforms like Boiler Room. His music has been released on labels including Planet Rhythm and Krill Music.

Following the Russian invasion of Ukraine in 2022, Detcom enlisted in the Ukrainian Armed Forces and has served on the front lines while continuing to produce music.

During summer 2022 he released a song called "Soldiers from Ukraine" which is a cover of a fascism-glorifying song Bojna Čavoglave by the Croatian rock singer singer Marko Perković. The song uses different lyrics, calling for the murder of Russians instead of Serbs, but uses the same melody. This version of the song was introduced during the Russian invasion of Ukraine.

== Military ==
On February 24, 2022, at the onset of Russia's full-scale invasion of Ukraine, Detcom enlisted in the Armed Forces of Ukraine to resist the Russian assault. It became part of the 206th Battalion of the Territorial Defense Forces and participated in combat operations across multiple regions, including Kyiv, Kherson, Vovchansk, and Bakhmut.
