= Geni kameni =

1996 studio album by Marko Perković

Studio album by Marko Perković Thompson
- Released: 1996
- Genre: Hard rock; rock
- Length: 39:45
- Label: Croatia Records

Marko Perković Thompson chronology
| Vrijeme škorpiona (1995) | Geni kameni (1996) | Vjetar s Dinare (1998) |

Geni kameni is the third studio album by the Croatian singer-songwriter Marko Perković Thompson, released in 1996.

The album's title track "Geni kameni" became the most popular from the album. The song talks about the "genes of stone" of the Croatians. Its high-charged public performance has made it a crowd-pleaser and part of the band's regular repertoire.

== Track listing ==
1. "Ka bez duše" (As without soul) (3:53)
2. "Geni kameni" (Genes of stone) (3:46)
3. "Bez ljubavi" (Without love) (3:34)
4. "Tamburaška" (Tambura song) (3:46)
5. "Zašto baš nju?" (Why her?) (5:03)
6. "Ovo mi diže tlak" (This raises my blood pressure) (3:36)
7. "Božićna" (Christmas song) (4:25)
8. "Draga" (Dear) (4:05)
9. "Kako mi je teško noćas" (How hard it is for me tonight) (4:19)
10. "Ima nešto vrijednije od zlata" (There's something worth more than gold) (3:18)
