= Turneja: Bilo jednom u Hrvatskoj Maksimir =

Turneja: Bilo jednom u Hrvatskoj

Video by Marko Perković Thompson
- Released: 2007
- Recorded: 17 June 2007, Maksimir Stadium, Zagreb, Croatia
- Genre: Croatian Rock
- Label: Croatia Records

Marko Perković Thompson chronology
Turneja: E, moj narode (2004)	Turneja: Bilo jednom u Hrvatskoj (2007)

Turneja: Bilo jednom u Hrvatskoj Maksimir is a concert video by the Croatian rock singer-songwriter Marko Perković Thompson, documenting his 17 June 2007 performance at Zagreb's Maksimir Stadium, in front of an estimated 60,000 people.

== Song list ==
1. "Uvod"
2. "Početak"
3. "Dolazak Hrvata"
4. "Duh ratnika"
5. "Ne varaj me"
6. "Prijatelji"
7. "Tamo gdje su moji korijeni"
8. "Moj Ivane"
9. "Stari se"
10. "Sine moj"
11. "Ratnici svjetla"
12. "Neću izdat ja"
13. "Moj dida i ja"
14. "E, moj narode"
15. "Kletva kralja Zvonimira"
16. "Reci, brate moj"
17. "Zaustavi se vjetre"
18. "Croatio, iz duše te ljubim (Tomislav Bralić and klapa Intrade)"
19. "Lijepa li si"
20. "Lipa Kaja"
21. "Iza devet sela"
22. "Bojna Čavoglave"
23. "Neka ni'ko ne dira u moj mali dio svemira"
24. "Geni kameni"
25. "Diva Grabovčeva"
26. "Dan dolazi"
27. "Lijepa li si"
