= Bilo jednom u Hrvatskoj =

Studio album by Marko Perković Thompson
- Released: 8 December 2006
- Genres: Heavy metal; Christian metal; hard rock
- Length: 59:30
- Label: Croatia Records

Marko Perković Thompson chronology
Sve najbolje (2003)	Bilo jednom u Hrvatskoj (2006)	Bilo jednom u Hrvatskoj: Split – Stari plac (2007)

Bilo jednom u Hrvatskoj is the sixth studio album by the Croatian singer-songwriter Marko Perković Thompson, released on 8 December 2006.

All songs on the album were written by Perković, with the exceptions of "Lipa Kaja" written by Zdenko Hršak and "Tamo gdje su moji korijeni" written by both Thompson and Faruk "Fayo" Buljubašić.

In 2007, 45,000 copies of the album were sold, making it Croatia Records' best-selling album of the year. It is one of the all-time best-selling albums in Croatia, with sales of over 120,000 units.

== Tracks ==
No.	Title	Length
1.	"Početak" (The Beginning)	6:44
2.	"Dolazak Hrvata" (The Arrival of the Croats)	4:46
3.	"Duh ratnika" (Spirit of the Warrior)	5:57
4.	"Diva Grabovčeva" (Grabovac Maiden)	5:44
5.	"Moj dida i ja" (My Grandfather and I)	4:44
6.	"Neka ni'ko ne dira u moj mali dio svemira" (May Nobody Touch My Little Part of the Universe)	4:17
7.	"Lipa Kaja" (Pretty Kaja)	3:49
8.	"Kletva kralja Zvonimira" (King Zvonimir's Curse)	5:14
9.	"Ratnici svjetla" (Warriors of the Light)	4:02
10.	"Dan dolazi" (The Day Is Coming)	5:42
11.	"Tamo gdje su moji korijeni" (There, Where My Roots Are)	3:56
12.	"Sine moj" (Oh, My Son)	4:10
Total length:		59:29
