= Hodočasnik =

2025 studio album by Marko Perković Thompson

Studio album by Marko Perković Thompson
- Released: 13 June 2025
- Studio: Karpo Media Studio; Studio Padovan
- Length: 67:20
- Language: Croatian
- Label: Croatia Records
- Producer: M. P. Thompson

Marko Perković Thompson chronology
Dugopolje (Live 2024) (2024)	Hodočasnik (2025)

Hodočasnik (Croatian for "Pilgrim") is the eighth studio album by Croatian rock singer-songwriter Marko Perković Thompson. It was released on 13 June 2025 by Croatia Records, twelve years after his previous studio album Ora et labora (2013).

== Release ==
The CD edition of the album is available in a digipak cover with a richly equipped booklet that contains the lyrics of all songs on 20 pages.

Before the official release of the album, Thompson released several songs, including: "Ako ne znaš šta je bilo", "Nepročitano pismo", "Devedeset neke" and others. The song "Kralj Tomislav" was released to the public without authorization, which led to changes in the promotional plan. Originally, the release of the song "Preskočena crta" was planned as the next song.

The album debuted at number one on the official Croatian music charts and remained there for weeks. In just three weeks, it became the best-selling domestic album of the first half of 2025, and is the first domestic album to reach number one in three years with new songs.

== Touring ==
The first major performance of the songs from the album took place at Thompson's concert at the Zagreb Hippodrome on 5 July 2025, in which an estimated 450,000 people attended, while Thompson's manager claimed a total of 504,000 people showed up. The estimated 485,000 tickets sold broke the record for the highest number of single-night concert tickets ever sold. A makeshift field hospital was set up in preparation for the event, featuring 200 patient beds and approximately 100 medical staff, who were supported by 17 ambulance teams stationed around the concert venue, along with 175 members of the Red Cross. The city of Zagreb implemented a state of heightened preparedness for the concert, with police restricting traffic in the neighbourhoods surrounding the venue.

== Track listing ==
No.	Title	Lyrics	Music	Producer	Length
1.	"Ustani iz sjene"	Ante Padovan; Marko Perković	Padovan; Perković	M. P. Thompson	3:57
2.	"Ravnoteža"	Perković; Nenad Ninčević	Perković	Thompson	4:34
3.	"Oluja"	Perković	Perković	Thompson	6:01
4.	"Nepročitano pismo"	Perković	Perković	Thompson	6:10
5.	"Kralj Tomislav"	Perković; Ninčević	Padovan; Perković	Thompson	6:59
6.	"Devedeset neke"	Perković; Ninčević	Perković	Thompson	5:33
7.	"Ako ne znaš šta je bilo" (featuring Hrvatske Ruže)	Ninčević	Perković	Thompson	4:59
8.	"Slike Bleiburga"	Perković	Perković	Thompson	6:14
9.	"Preskočena crta"	Perković; Ninčević	Perković	Thompson	5:31
10.	"Zagora"	Perković; Ninčević	Perković	Thompson	6:34
11.	"Gospin dom"	Perković; Ninčević	Padovan; Perković	Thompson	4:55
12.	"Život"	Perković; Ninčević	Perković	Thompson	5:53
Total length:					67:20

== Charts ==
=== Weekly charts ===
Weekly chart performance for Hodočasnik
Chart (2025)	Peak position
Austrian Albums (Ö3 Austria)	54
Croatian Domestic Albums (HDU)	1

=== Monthly charts ===
Monthly chart performance for Hodočasnik
Chart (2025)	Peak position
Croatian Domestic Vinyls (HDU)	1
