= E, moj narode =

2002 studio album by Marko Perković Thompson

Studio album by Marko Perković Thompson
- Released: 2002
- Genre: Pop, Rock
- Length: 52:44
- Label: Croatia Records

Marko Perković Thompson chronology
Vjetar s Dinare (1998)	E, moj narode (2002)	Sve najbolje (2003)

E, moj narode is the fifth studio album by the Croatian singer-songwriter Marko Perković Thompson, released in 2002.

The song "Moj Ivane" is originally a Croat folk song from Kupres, Bosnia and Herzegovina. Thompson's modernized version greatly popularized it. The song is part of the singer's regular repertoire.

"Reci, brate moj" is a duet with Miroslav Škoro. "Stari se" was written and composed for Thompson by Siniša Vuco.

== Track listing ==
1. "Iza devet sela" (Beyond Nine Villages) (4:00)
2. "Ne varaj me" (Don't Deceive Me) (4:15)
3. "E, moj narode" (Hey, My People) (4:56)
4. "Neću izdat' ja" (I Won't Betray) (4:08)
5. "Zeleno je bilo polje" (Green Was the Field) (4:08)
6. "Radost s visina" (The Joy from Above) (4:58)
7. "Reci, brate moj" (Say, My Brother) (4:25)
8. "Moj Ivane" (Oh, My John) (3:33)
9. "Ne pitaj mene" (Don't Ask Me) (4:10)
10. "Stari se" (Getting Old) (3:45)
11. "Lijepa li si" (How Beautiful You Are) (with Alen Vitasović, Giuliano, Mate Bulić, Miroslav Škoro and Mladen Grdović) (4:18)
12. "Geni kameni" (Genes of Stone) (live) (6:02)

== Charts ==
Chart performance for E, moj narode
Chart (2025)	Peak position
Croatian Domestic Albums (HDU)	2
