= Bojna Čavoglave =

1992 single by Marko Perković Thompson

- Cassette single cover

Single by Marko Perković Thompson
- B-side: "Bojna Čavoglave" (instrumental); "Moli mala"
- Published: 31 December 1991
- Released: 1 February 1992
- Recorded: 24 December 1991
- Studio: Silvije Škare's studio (Split, Croatia)
- Genre: Folk rock
- Length: 3:24
- Label: Skalinada; Croatia Records
- Songwriter: Marko Perković
- Producer: Eva Silas

Marko Perković Thompson singles chronology
"Bojna Čavoglave" (1992)	"Zmija me za srce ugrizla" (1992)

Music video
- "Bojna Čavoglave" on YouTube

"Bojna Čavoglave" (Croatian for 'Čavoglave Battalion'), commonly referred to as just "Čavoglave", is a song by the Croatian musician Marko Perković Thompson. A folk rock war song, it was released as Perković's debut single on 1 February 1992 through Skalinada and Croatia Records. The song was composed during the Croatian War of Independence, becoming a popular wartime song. A remix version was included on Perković's debut studio album Moli mala (1992), while the single version was included on his first greatest hits album Sve najbolje (2003). Its performances after the conclusion of the war have been highly controversial in Croatia due to the song's heavily nationalist lyrics.

== Background ==
Marko Perković joined the Croatian National Guard as a volunteer in 1991. Following the falls of Siverić, Drniš, and Oklaj to the Yugoslav People's Army (JNA) in September, and the flight of the population of the villages surrounding Čavoglave, the village's residents assembled their own battalion. Perković was given a Thompson submachine gun, thus earning the nom de guerre Thompson. An amateur musician, he composed the song "Bojna Čavoglave" with others fighting in the battalion. The initial version of the song was around 15 minutes long. Days before Christmas, one of Perković's comrades suggested that the song be recorded professionally in a studio. In the studio, the song was shortened and finalized during the night of Christmas Eve. In the morning, the cassette tape containing the track was given to Hrvatski Radio – Studio Split. Miroslav Lilić first aired it on New Year's Eve 1991; merely five minutes following the track's premiere, Čavoglave was targeted by mortars from the nearby village of Baljci, the headquarters of the Serb rebels in the area.

== Release ==
The song's premiere on Hrvatski Radio launched Perković into stardom overnight. Already on 1 February 1992, "Bojna Čavoglave" was released on an audio cassette as a single through Zdenko Runjić's label Skalinada, and Croatia Records. The single was certified gold. Alongside "Bojna Čavoglave", the cassette featured another Perković track, "Moli mala".

== Composition ==
"Bojna Čavoglave" is a folk rock song, set in a 7/8 time signature, resembling Macedonian folk music.

=== Lyrics ===
Croatian

Za dom — spremni!

U Zagori na izvoru rijeke Čikole
𝄆 Stala braća da obrane naše domove! 𝄇
Stoji Hrvat do Hrvata, mi smo braća svi
𝄆 Nećete u Čavoglave dok smo živi mi! 𝄇
Puče Thompson, Kalašnjikov, a i Zbrojevka
𝄆 Baci bombu, goni bandu preko izvora 𝄇
Korak naprijed, puška gotovs i uz pjesmu svi
𝄆 Za dom, braćo, za slobodu, borimo se mi! 𝄇

Čujte, srpski dobrovoljci, bando četnici
𝄆 Stići će vas naša ruka i u Srbiji! 𝄇
Stići će vas Božja pravda, to već svatko zna
𝄆 Sudit će vam bojovnici iz Čavoglava! 𝄇
Slušajte sad poruku od svetog Ilije:
𝄆 Nećete u Čavoglave, niste ni prije! 𝄇
Oj Hrvati, braćo mila iz Čavoglava
𝄆 Hrvatska vam zaboravit neće nikada! 𝄇
𝄆 Neće nikada! 𝄇

Neće nikada!

English translation

For the homeland — ready!

In the Hinterland, at the spring of the Čikola River,
𝄆 Brothers stood to defend our homes! 𝄇
A Croat stands by a Croat, we are all brothers,
𝄆 You will not [go] to Čavoglave while we are alive! 𝄇
Firing the Thompson, the Kalashnikov, and the Zbrojovka as well!
𝄆 Toss the bomb, chase the gang away, beyond the spring! 𝄇
Step forward, with your rifle ready, everyone sing the song:
𝄆 For our home, brothers, for our freedom, we are fighting! 𝄇

Listen, Serb volunteers, you gang of Chetniks
𝄆 Our hand will reach you in Serbia too! 𝄇
God's justice will reach you, everyone already knows that:
𝄆 You will be judged by the warriors from Čavoglave! 𝄇
Now listen to the message from Saint Elijah:
𝄆 You will not [go] to Čavoglave, and you haven't before! 𝄇
Oh Croats, dear brothers from Čavoglave
𝄆 Croatia will never forget you! 𝄇
𝄆 It will never! 𝄇

It will never!

One of the initial versions of the track contained the lyric "Čujte, Baljci, Mirlovići...", which sparked revolt amongst the Croatian soldiers whose surnames were Mirlović. Perković clarified in a 14 January 1992 Slobodna Dalmacija interview that "Mirlovići" referred to the village of Mirlović Polje and those of its inhabitants who were Serb volunteers.

Another difference are the lyrics "Za dom, braćo, zovemo se poglavnikovi" ('For our home, brothers, we are called the poglavnik's') and "Oj ustaše, braćo mila iz Imotskoga" ('O Ustaše, dear brothers from Imotski'), omitted from the official release. This version was performed on 25 July 1992 on the Split Riviera, at a rally of the Croatian Party of Rights, an opposition far-right party, ahead of the 1992 Croatian parliamentary and presidential elections.

== Critical reception ==
In 2019, Miljenko Jergović wrote for Radio Sarajevo: "Thus, in Croatia, a young outsider will emerge—resembling Danilo Dača Živković in every way—filled with the same vision of a song greater than the singer himself, one that would lift both him and all those around him several thousand meters above the ground. It was wartime, the perfect moment for such a song. And he was entirely in the style and manner of Central Bosnian hard rock of the 1980s, having emerged from under Bregović's coat, with an ear for the Balkans and Balkan emotional states, and so he composed a song which, to him, seemed completely new, beginning with a then-taboo rallying cry: 'Za dom – spremni!' Yet the song was neither new, nor was the rhythm Croatian."

== Music video ==
The music video of "Bojna Čavoglave" was filmed on the front line, near the village of Čavoglave, and first premiered on Otvorena Televizija (OTV).

== Controversy ==
The first line of the song is "Za dom spremni", the salute infamously used by the Ustaša government during the time of the Independent State of Croatia (NDH). Due to the Ustaša genocides in the NDH, the song is considered highly controversial. The High Misdemeanour Court of Croatia originally found the line to be a criminal offense, which risked a ban of the song. However, Thompson appealed the decision. The same High Misdemeanour Court accepted his appeal, allowing Thompson to use the salute in the song and in concerts.

This controversy was further strengthened by the fact that Croatian association football fans were using the slogan and singing "Bojna Čavoglave", along with "Moja Hercegovina", a song by Herzegovinian Croat singer Mate Bulić, in the 2023 UEFA Nations League final. Other fans, who were on a flight to Zagreb from the 2022 FIFA World Cup in Qatar, also started singing "Bojna Čavoglave" on the plane. At a party in Zagreb, after returning from the World Cup, Croatia players Dejan Lovren and Marcelo Brozović also sang the song, together with "Anica − Kninska kraljica", another one of Thompson's war songs.

In December 2025, despite being told by local authorities in Zagreb not to use the Ustaša salute in the song "Bojna Čavoglave", Thompson did so regardless on 26 December 2025 at Arena Zagreb and was banned from holding a second concert the following day. This caused a political controversy, with Thompson's lawyer Andro Marijanović announcing legal action against Mayor of Zagreb Tomislav Tomašević, and calling for his overthrow and the overthrow of his We Can! party.

== Covers ==
In 1994, the Italian band Attacco Frontale covered "Čavoglave" in Italian.

Following the 2014 Russian annexation of Crimea and subsequent outbreak of the Russo-Ukrainian War, a Ukrainian version, titled "Ми найсильніші" ('My naisylnishi'), appeared online. In 2022, following the Russian invasion of Ukraine, another Ukrainian version of "Čavoglave", entitled "Солдати з України" (Soldaty z Ukrainy), was recorded by Ukrainian producer and soldier Detcom, its lyrics targeting Russia instead of Serbia.

== Track listing ==
- Audio cassette
1. "Bojna Čavoglave"
2. "Bojna Čavoglave" (instrumental)
3. "Moli mala"

Both sides of the cassette feature the same tracklist. The version of "Moli mala" featured on the cassette is an early one; the version featured on the eponymous album is a reworked one.

== Personnel ==
Credits taken from Discogs.

- Marko Perković – songwriting
- Toni Lasan – arrangement
- Damir Tešija – arrangement
- Eva Silas – producer, editor
- Ivo Josipović – executive producer
- Božidar Vukičević – photography
- Ivan Stančić – graphic design
- Vojno Kundić – editor
- Siniša Škarica – editor-in-chief
- Zdenko Runjić – editor-in-chief

Recorded at Silvije Škare's studio in Split, Croatia.
