= Bilo jednom u Hrvatskoj: Split – Stari plac =

Live album by Marko Perković Thompson
- Released: 2007
- Recorded: July 27, 2007
- Genres: Hard rock, Heavy metal, Christian rock
- Label: Croatia Records

Marko Perković Thompson chronology
Bilo jednom u Hrvatskoj (2006)	Bilo jednom u Hrvatskoj: Split – Stari plac (2007)	Druga strana (2008)

Bilo jednom u Hrvatskoj: Split – Stari plac (Once upon a time in Croatia: Split – Stari plac) is a live concert album by the Croatian rock singer-songwriter Marko Perković Thompson. It was released in December 2007, nearly a year after the in-studio album of the same name.

The album was recorded at the band's concert in Split in front of over 25,000 people.

== Tracks ==
No.	Title	Length
1.	"Uvod" (Intro)	2:50
2.	"Početak" (The beginning)	6:55
3.	"Dolazak Hrvata" (The arrival of the Croats)	5:39
4.	"Duh ratnika" (Spirit of the Warrior)	6:36
5.	"Ne varaj me" (Don’t deceive me)	4:40
6.	"Moj dida i ja" (My Grandfather and I)	5:14
7.	"E, moj narode" (Hey, my people)	4:17
8.	"Kletva kralja Zvonimira" (King Zvonimir's curse)	5:31
9.	"Zaustavi se, vjetre" (· Stop, you winds)	8:27
10.	"Lijepa li si" (You are beautiful)	5:23
11.	"Lipa Kaja" (Beautiful "Kaja")	3:56
12.	"Neka ni'ko ne dira u moj mali dio svemira" (Let nobody touch my little part of the Universe)	4:19
13.	"Diva Grabovčeva" (Grabovac Maiden)	5:54
14.	"Dan dolazi" (The Day is coming)	9:02
Total length:		1:19:43
