= Vjetar s Dinare =

1998 studio album by Marko Perković Thompson

Studio album by Marko Perković Thompson
- Released: 1998
- Genre: Folk/Rock
- Length: 37:09
- Label: Croatia Records

Marko Perković Thompson chronology
Geni kameni (1996)	Vjetar s Dinare (1998)	E, moj narode (2002)

Vjetar s Dinare is the fourth studio album by the Croatian singer-songwriter Marko Perković Thompson. It was released in 1998. The opening track "Zaustavi se, vjetre" plays out as a conversation between Thompson and the Dinaric winds, sung by a Dalmatian klapa, in which Thompson begs the winds to tell him about his family. "Prijatelji" is a song about reminiscence of wartime friends, and deals with topics of post-war delusion feelings of veterans.

The song "Lijepa li si" is a patriotic song which takes its name from the popular metonym for Croatia, "Lijepa naša", the title of the country's national anthem. "Ej, haj, pjesme naše" talks about the power of music.

The album was certified diamond in Croatia.

== Track listing ==
No.	Title	Length
1.	"Zaustavi se vjetre" (Stop, you winds)	4:19
2.	"Prijatelji" (Friends)	3:56
3.	"Lijepa li si" (You are beautiful)	4:18
4.	"Ej, haj, pjesme naše" (Hey ho, our songs)	4:07
5.	"Dobro jutro" (Good morning)	3:36
6.	"Crne noći, bijeli putevi [remix]" (Black nights, white roads)	3:00
7.	"Pijem dušo" (I'm drinking my dear)	3:15
8.	"Zašto si se okomila na me?" (Why do you hit on me?)	3:26
9.	"Ostavio sam te draga" (I left you dear)	3:36
10.	"Pukni puško" (Fire, rifle)	3:36
Total length:		37:09
