= Zagreb Hippodrome =

Horse racing venue in Croatia

Hippodrome Zagreb
- Zagrebački Hipodrom
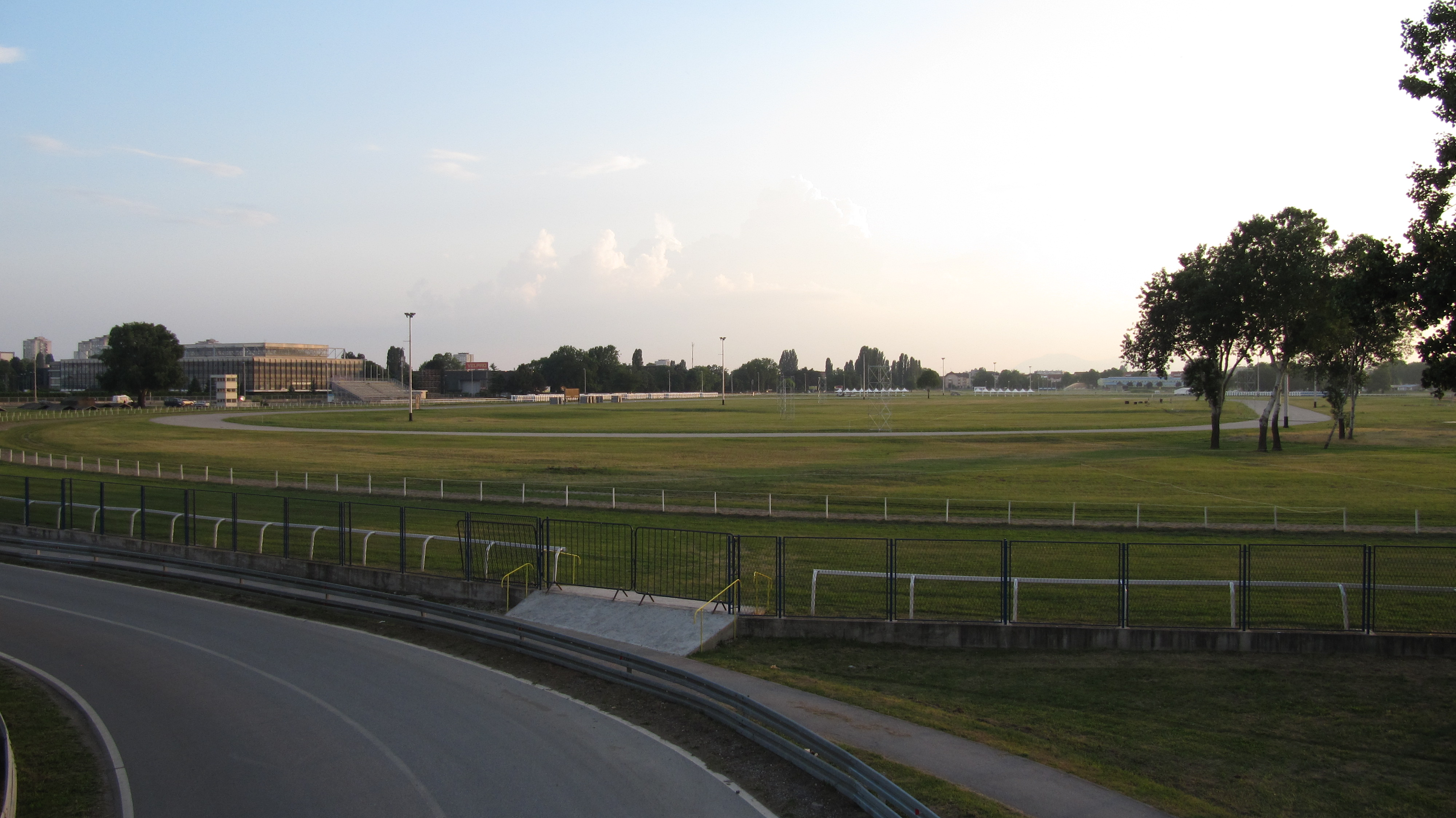
- Zagreb Hippodrome from Liberty Bridge, Zagreb
- Interactive map of Hippodrome Zagreb
- Location: Kajzerica, Novi Zagreb, Zagreb, Croatia
- Coordinates: 45°47′07″N 15°58′18″E
- Owner: City of Zagreb
- Events: Horseracing and concerts
- Field shape: Flat and harness
- Acreage: 47 hectares

Construction
- Opened: 1950

Website
- https://www.sportskiobjekti.hr/hipodrom-zagreb-1373/1373

The Zagreb Hippodrome (Croatian: Zagrebački hipodrom) is a horse racing venue in Zagreb, Croatia. It was built from 1947 to 1950, with a design based on the Longchamp Racecourse in Paris. It is located in the neighbourhood of Kajzerica, on the southern bank of the Sava river, near the Bundek lake. The venue covers an area of 47 hectares (120 acres). It was originally built with three racetracks, having lengths of 1,000 metres (3,300 ft), 1,600 m (5,200 ft), and 2,400 m (7,900 ft), but the longest track was removed to make space for an indoor riding hall after the 1987 Summer Universiade. A space for steeplechase races is located in the inside area of the smallest track.

The Zagreb Hippodrome has been managed by the Zagreb Equestrian Club (Konjički klub Zagreb) since 1952. The most important event at the Hippodrome is the yearly International June Tournament (Lipanjski turnir), which has been held since 1955. The venue has been criticised for bad management and track maintenance, and small horse stalls which do not satisfy today's health and safety requirements. The stables hold around 160 horses.

The street where the venue is located was renamed in honour of Radoslav Cimerman, a Croatian horse riding champion who fell from his horse and died in 1974 while training at the Zagreb Hippodrome. In 1994, Pope John Paul II celebrated a mass at the Hippodrome, which was attended by a million people. Pope Benedict XVI also celebrated a mass at the Hippodrome in 2011.

== Concerts ==
The Hippodrome is also used as a concert venue, hosting The Rolling Stones, The Red Hot Chili Peppers, Metallica, and Ed Sheeran. The hippodrome also hosted the biggest ticketed single-night concert in history, headlined by Marko "Thompson" Perković.

| Date | Artist | Tour | Attendance |
|---|---|---|---|
| 20 August 1998 | The Rolling Stones | Bridges to Babylon Tour | 76,000 |
| 16 May 2010 | Metallica | World Magnetic Tour | 30,000 |
| 29 August 2012 | The Red Hot Chili Peppers | I'm with You World Tour | 35,000 |
| 10 August 2024 | Ed Sheeran | +–=÷× Tour | 70,000 |
| 5 July 2025 | Marko Perković "Thompson" | Hodočasnik Tour | 504,000 |

== Gallery ==
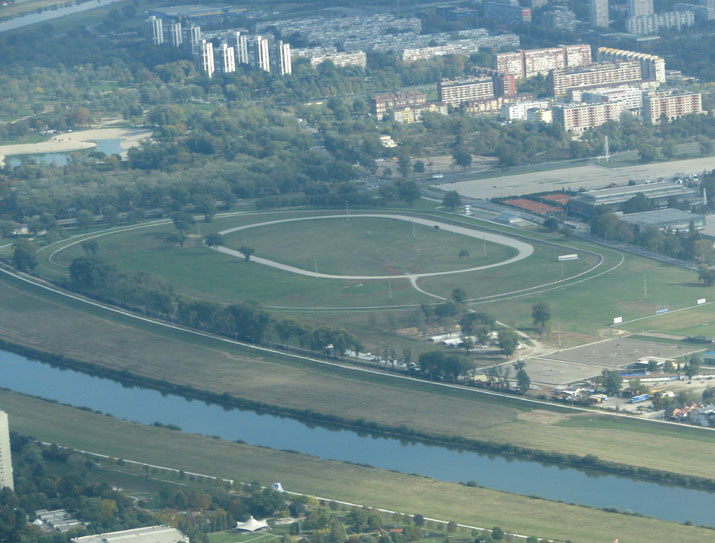
Aerial view

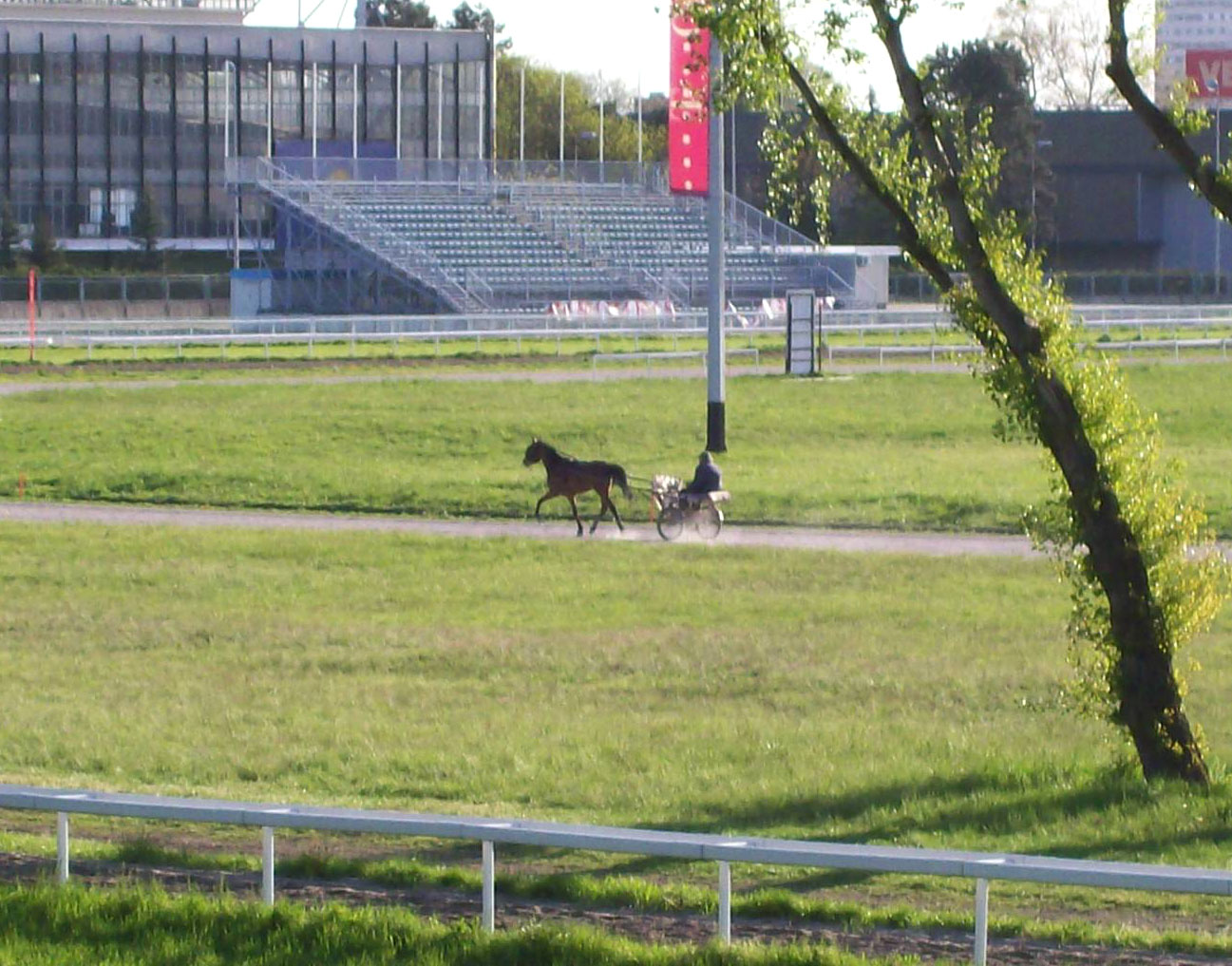
Horse racing

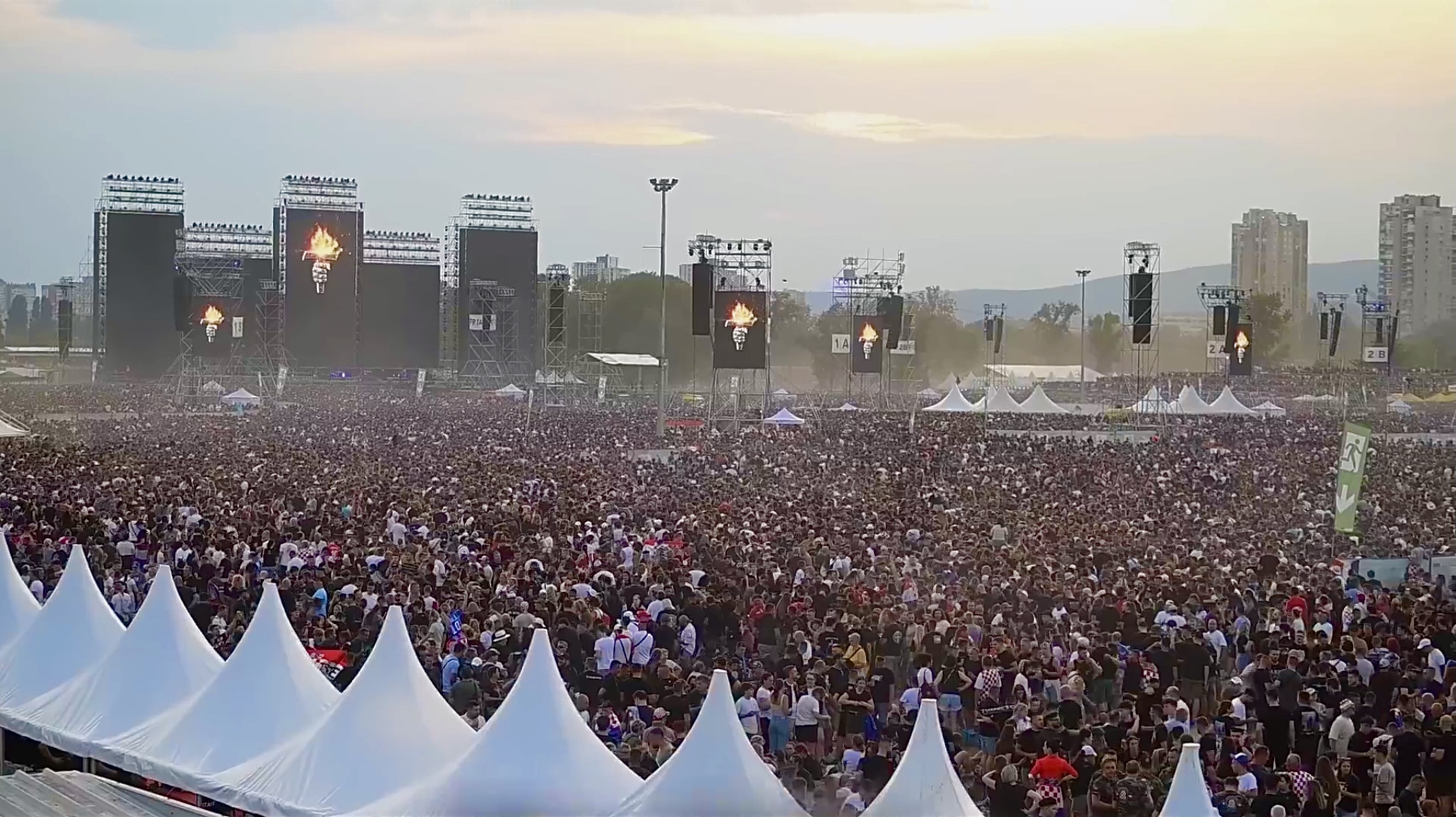
Marko Perković Thompson concert with record attendance of 500,000 people
