= List of most-attended concerts =

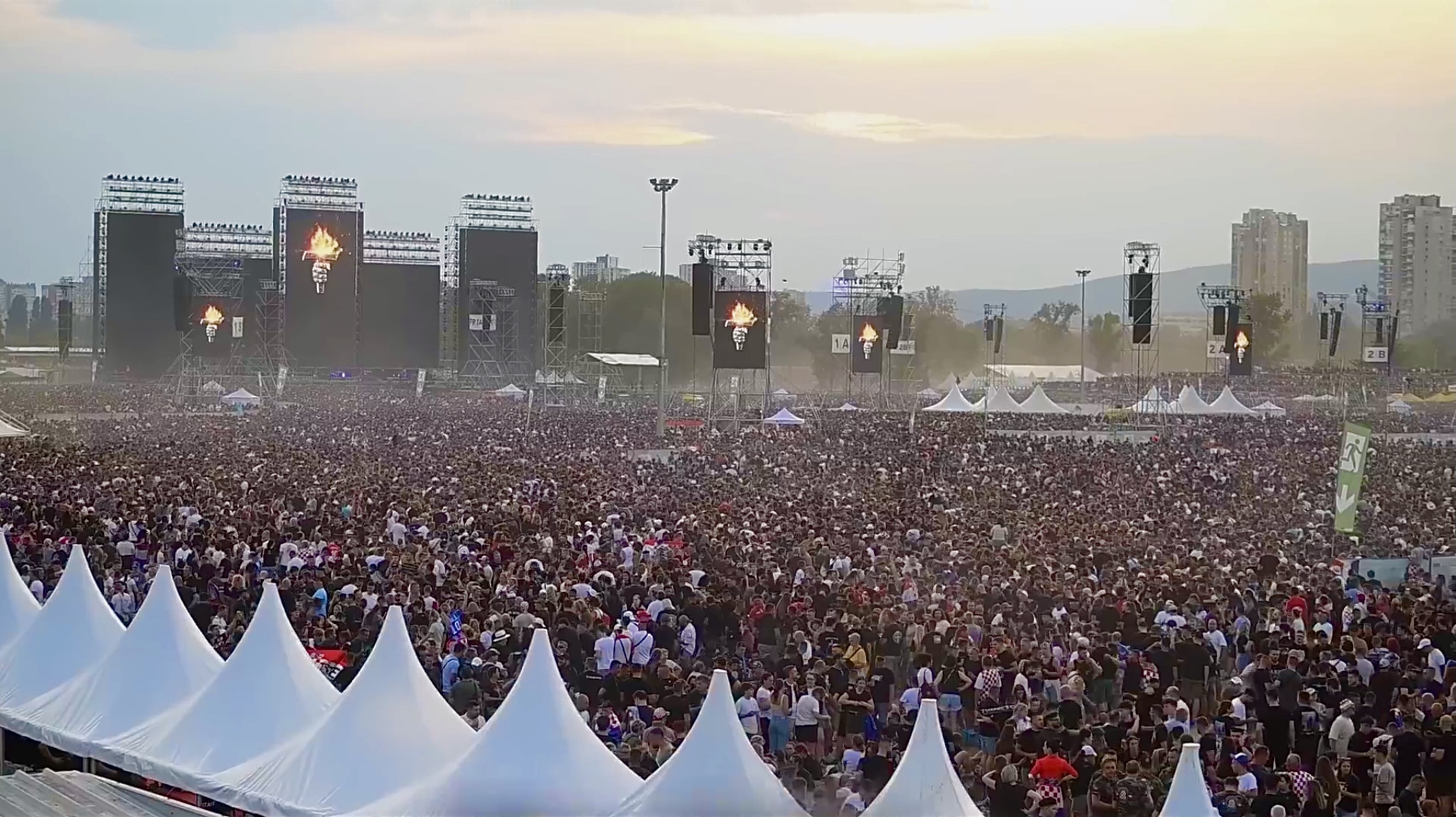
Marko Perković Thompson's concert in July 2025 at the Zagreb Hippodrome in Zagreb, Croatia, is the concert with the most tickets sold in history (504,027).

The following is a list of the most-attended concerts in history, including ticketed concerts with at least 100,000 tickets sold and free concerts with at least one million attendees. The list excludes concerts that are part of music festivals.

The first concert to sell at least 100,000 tickets was by the Grateful Dead at Englishtown Raceway Park in 1977, with 107,019 tickets sold. Currently, Marko Perković Thompson holds the record for the concert with the most tickets sold, held in 2025 at the Zagreb Hippodrome, with 504,027 tickets sold. Additionally, Michael Jackson held 11 concerts with at least 100,000 tickets sold, Robbie Williams held four such concerts, and Queen, the Rolling Stones and Marko Perković Thompson each held such concert three times.

The attendance numbers of free concerts are often exaggerations. The first to attract at least one million attendees was by Jean-Michel Jarre on Place de la Concorde in 1979. Rod Stewart holds the record for highest attendance, 1994 at Copacabana Beach, drawing over 3.5 million attendees. Additionally, Jarre held a total of five free concerts with over a million spectators. Madonna, Lady Gaga, and Shakira are the only female artists to have held such concerts. Each did so once, with Gaga holding the female attendance record with an audience estimated at 2.1 to 2.5 million.

== Ticketed concerts ==
Key
*	Indicates the concert had sold the most tickets up to that point

Concerts with over 100,000 tickets sold
Rank	Tickets sold	Artist	Venue	City	Event	Date	Ref.
1	504,027	Marko Perković	Zagreb Hippodrome	Zagreb	Hodočasnik Tour 2025 *	July 5, 2025	
2	250,332	Ultimo	Piazzale Giovanni Paolo II	Rome	La Favola Per Sempre	July 4, 2026	
3	225,173	Vasco Rossi	Parco Enzo Ferrari	Modena	Modena Park 2017 *	July 1, 2017	
4	220,000	Bijelo Dugme	Belgrade Hippodrome	Belgrade	Turneja 2005 *	June 28, 2005	
5	200,000	Glay	Makuhari Messe	Chiba	Glay Expo'99 Survival *	July 31, 1999	
6	190,000	Indio Solari	Predio La Colmena	Olavarría	Olavarría 2017	March 11, 2017	(Note: Estimated ticket sales ranged between 190,000 and 200,000, while total attendance was higher, estimated between 350,000 and 400,000 people.)
7	184,000	Paul McCartney	Maracanã Stadium	Rio de Janeiro	The Paul McCartney World Tour *	April 20, 1990	
8	180,000	Tina Turner	Maracanã Stadium	Rio de Janeiro	Break Every Rule World Tour *	January 16, 1988	
9	175,000	Frank Sinatra	Maracanã Stadium	Rio de Janeiro	Frank Sinatra Live *	January 26, 1980	
10	165,264	Luciano Ligabue	Aeroporto di Reggio Emilia	Reggio Emilia	Campovolo	September 10, 2005	
11	160,000	Bruce Springsteen · E Street Band	Radrennbahn Weissensee	East Berlin	Tunnel of Love Express Tour	July 19, 1988	
12	151,000	Marko Perković	Hipodrom Sinj	Sinj	Hodočasnik Tour 2025	August 4, 2025	
13	150,000	Ceca	Ušće Park	Belgrade	Poziv Tour	June 28, 2013	
14	150,000	U2	Aeroporto di Reggio Emilia	Reggio Emilia	PopMart Tour	September 20, 1997	
15	150,000	Roger Waters	Potsdamer Platz	Berlin	Live in Berlin	July 21, 1990	
16	137,000	Kiss	Maracanã Stadium	Rio de Janeiro	Creatures of the Night Tour	June 18, 1983	
17	135,000	Robbie Williams	Phoenix Park	Dublin	2003 Tour	August 9, 2003	
18	131,000	Queen	Estádio do Morumbi	São Paulo	The Game Tour	March 20, 1981	
19	130,000	Helene Fischer	Neue Messe München	Munich	Rausch Live – In München 2022	August 20, 2022	
20	130,000	Madonna	Parc de Sceaux	Paris	Who's That Girl World Tour	August 29, 1987	
21	126,742	The Rolling Stones	Great Strahov Stadium	Prague	Voodoo Lounge Tour	August 5, 1995	
22	125,000	Michael Jackson	Letná Park	Prague	HIStory World Tour	September 7, 1996	
23	125,000	Michael Jackson	Aintree Racecourse	Liverpool	Bad World Tour	September 11, 1988	
24	122,000	Lepa Brena	Vasil Levski National Stadium	Sofia	Great Bulgarian Tour	July 24, 1990	
25	120,000	Michael Jackson	Warsaw Babice Airport	Warsaw	History World Tour	September 20, 1996	
26	120,000	Vasco Rossi	Trentino Music Arena	Trento	Vasco Live Tour 2022	May 20, 2022	
27	120,000	Ceca	Ušće Park	Belgrade	Grom Tour	June 17, 2006	
28	120,000	Madonna	Maracanã Stadium	Rio de Janeiro	The Girlie Show	November 6, 1993	
29	120,000	The Rolling Stones	Roundhay Park	Leeds	European Tour 1982	July 25, 1982	
30	120,000	Queen	Estádio do Morumbi	São Paulo	The Game Tour	March 21, 1981	
31	118,000	Kanye West	Atatürk Olympic Stadium	Istanbul	Ye Live Concert Tour	May 30, 2026	
32	115,000	Pink Floyd	Strahov Stadium	Prague	The Division Bell Tour	September 7, 1994	
33	112,408	Zach Bryan	Michigan Stadium	Ann Arbor	Big House	September 27, 2025	
34	111,989	Coldplay	Narendra Modi Stadium	Ahmedabad	Music of the Spheres World Tour	January 26, 2025	
35	111,581	Coldplay	Narendra Modi Stadium	Ahmedabad	Music of the Spheres World Tour	January 25, 2025	
36	110,905	George Strait	Kyle Field	College Station	The King at Kyle Field	June 15, 2024	
37	110,000	Michael Jackson	Estadio Azteca	Mexico City	Dangerous World Tour	November 11, 1993	
38	110,000	Michael Jackson	Estadio Azteca	Mexico City	Dangerous World Tour	November 9, 1993	
39	110,000	Michael Jackson	Estadio Azteca	Mexico City	Dangerous World Tour	November 7, 1993	
40	110,000	Michael Jackson	Estadio Azteca	Mexico City	Dangerous World Tour	October 31, 1993	
41	110,000	Michael Jackson	Estadio Azteca	Mexico City	Dangerous World Tour	October 29, 1993	
42	110,000	Ed Sheeran	Melbourne Cricket Ground	Melbourne	+–=÷× Tour	March 3, 2023	
43	108,000	Ed Sheeran	Melbourne Cricket Ground	Melbourne	+–=÷× Tour	March 2, 2023	
44	107,019	Grateful Dead	Raceway Park	Englishtown	Terrapin Station Tour *	September 3, 1977	
45	105,000	AC/DC	RCF Arena	Reggio Emilia	Power Up Tour	May 25, 2024	
46	105,000	Michael Jackson	Estádio do Morumbi	São Paulo	Dangerous World Tour	October 17, 1993	
47	105,000	Michael Jackson	Estádio do Morumbi	São Paulo	Dangerous World Tour	October 15, 1993	
48	104,793	George Strait	AT&T Stadium	Arlington	The Cowboy Rides Away Tour	June 7, 2014	
49	102,000	Garth Brooks	Tiger Stadium	Baton Rouge	The Garth Brooks Stadium Tour	April 30, 2022	
50	100,000	Marko Perković	Industrial zone Vukovar	Vukovar	Hodočasnik Tour 2026	August 29, 2026	
51	100,000	Hua Chenyu	Beijing National Stadium	Beijing	2023 Mars Concert Tour	September 9, 2023	
52	100,000	Hua Chenyu	Beijing National Stadium	Beijing	2023 Mars Concert Tour	September 10, 2023	
53	100,000	Harry Styles	RCF Arena	Reggio Emilia	Love On Tour	July 23, 2023	
54	100,000	Sandy & Junior	Barra Olympic Park	Rio de Janeiro	Nossa História	November 9, 2019	
55	100,000	Ricky Martin	Zócalo	Mexico City	One World Tour	November 25, 2017	
56	100,000	Shakira	Giza Plateau	Cairo	Oral Fixation Tour	March 28, 2007	
57	100,000	Luna Sea	Tokyo Big Sight	Tokyo	10th Anniversary Gig	May 30, 1999	
58	100,000	Michael Jackson	Yarkon Park	Tel Aviv	Dangerous World Tour	September 21, 1993	
59	100,000	The Alfee	Odaiba	Tokyo	Sweat & Tears Tokyo-Bay Area	August 3, 1986	
60	100,000	Bob Marley and the Wailers	San Siro	Milan	Uprising Tour	June 27, 1980	

== Free concerts ==
Keys
*	Indicates the concert had the highest attendance up to that point
‡	Indicates a standalone free concert

Concerts with over 1 million people in attendance
Rank	Attendees	Artist	Venue	City	Event	Date	Ref.
1	3,500,000	Rod Stewart	Copacabana Beach	Rio de Janeiro	New Year's Eve in Copacabana *	December 31, 1994	(Note: According to Folha de S. Paulo in 1995, event's organizers estimated an audience of 4 million, while the Military Police of 3.5 million.)
2	3,500,000	Jean-Michel Jarre	Moscow State University	Moscow	850th Anniversary of Moscow	September 6, 1997	
3	3,000,000	Jorge Ben	Copacabana Beach	Rio de Janeiro	New Year's Eve in Copacabana *	December 31, 1993	
4	2,500,000	Jean-Michel Jarre	La Défense	Paris	Bastille Day *	July 14, 1990	
5	2,100,000	Lady Gaga	Copacabana Beach	Rio de Janeiro	Todo Mundo no Rio ‡	May 3, 2025	(Note: Promoter Live Nation and Gaga's representatives estimated an audience of 2.5 million, while local authorities reported 2.1 million.)
6	2,000,000	Shakira	Copacabana Beach	Rio de Janeiro	Todo Mundo no Rio ‡	May 2, 2026	
7	2,000,000	Diante do Trono	Campo de Marte Airport	São Paulo	Quero Me Apaixonar	July 12, 2003	
8	1,800,000	Antonello Venditti	Circus Maximus	Rome	AS Roma's 3rd Serie A Victory	June 24, 2001	
9	1,600,000	Madonna	Copacabana Beach	Rio de Janeiro	Todo Mundo no Rio ‡	May 4, 2024	(Note: Reported official assistance by Rio City Hall and the touring promoter. Other media outlets estimated an attendance as high as 2.5 million people according to El País.)
10	1,600,000	Calvin Harris	Consolação Street	São Paulo	Skol Carnival Block	February 8, 2026	
11	1,500,000	The Rolling Stones	Copacabana Beach	Rio de Janeiro	A Bigger Bang Tour ‡	February 18, 2006	(Note: According to Folha de S. Paulo in 2006, other estimations ranged from 1.2 to 1.3 million attendees.)
12	1,500,000	Various	Philadelphia Museum of Art	Philadelphia	Live 8	July 2, 2005	
13	1,500,000	Various	Tushino Airfield	Moscow	Monsters of Rock	September 28, 1991	
14	1,300,000	Jean-Michel Jarre	Downtown Houston	Houston	150th Anniversary of Houston *	April 5, 1986	
15	1,200,000	Diante do Trono	Bahia Administrative Center	Salvador	Esperança	July 10, 2004	
16	1,200,000	Diante do Trono	Ministries Esplanade	Brasília	Nos Braços do Pai	July 13, 2002	
17	1,000,000	Various	Plaza de la Revolución	Havana	Paz Sin Fronteras II	September 20, 2009	
18	1,000,000	Black Eyed Peas	Ipanema Beach	Rio de Janeiro	New Year's Eve	December 31, 2006	
19	1,000,000	The Beach Boys	Philadelphia Museum of Art	Philadelphia	Independence Day	July 4, 1985	
20	1,000,000	Jean-Michel Jarre	Place de la Concorde	Paris	Bastille Day *	July 14, 1979	

== See also ==
- List of highest-grossing live music artists
- List of highest-grossing concert tours
- List of highest-grossing concert tours by Latin artists
- List of highest-grossing concert tours by women
- List of highest-grossing benefit concerts
