= Anica − Kninska kraljica =

1995 song by Marko Perković Thompson

"Anica – kninska kraljica"

Song by Marko Perković Thompson

from the album Vrijeme škorpiona
- Released: 1995
- Recorded: 1995
- Genre: Folk rock
- Length: 3:50
- Songwriter: Marko Perković
- Producer: Ante Pupačić

"Anica − kninska kraljica" (transl. Annie – the queen of Knin) is a nationalist folk rock song by the Croatian singer-songwriter Marko Perković Thompson, released in 1995 as the seventh track from his second studio album, Vrijeme škorpiona.

== Charts ==
Chart (2025)	Peak position
Croatia (Billboard)	24
