= Zdenko Runjić =

- Born: 26 October 1942; Garčin, Independent State of Croatia
- Died: 27 October 2004 (aged 62); Krapinske Toplice, Croatia
- Occupations: Songwriter; businessman; music producer
- Spouse: Vedrana Runjić
- Children: Boris, Ana and Ivana
- Musical career
- Genres: Pop

Zdenko Runjić (26 October 1942 – 27 October 2004) was a Croatian songwriter. His career spanned decades in the former Yugoslavia and Croatia.

== Biography ==
Runjić was born on 26 October 1942 in the village of Garčin near Slavonski Brod. Many of his songs were inspired by the folk traditions of Dalmatia. The songs became classics and Runjić helped the careers of many notable Croatian musicians such as Oliver Dragojević, Doris Dragović and Meri Cetinić. He was especially successful at the Split Music Festival. He wrote almost 700 songs which sold several million copies in both albums and singles.More than 200 songs were written for Dragojević alone. He was also a successful businessman and music producer. He owned a record company called Skalinada.

In 1993, following a dispute with the Split Music Festival organisers, he founded the rival music festival called Melodije Hrvatskog Jadrana (Melodies of the Croatian Adriatic), which is ongoing as of 2025. On 27 October 2004, Runjić died in Krapinske Toplice from a stroke while recovering from a heart attack.

== See also ==
- Croatian music
