= Ora et labora (album) =

Studio album by Marko Perković Thompson
- Released: 10 April 2013
- Recorded: 2011–2013
- Genres: Heavy metal; Christian metal; hard rock; power metal
- Length: 60:00
- Label: Croatia Records

Marko Perković Thompson chronology
Josef soundtrack (2011)	Ora et labora (2013)	Poljud Live – Ora et labora (2013)

Singles from Ora et labora
- 1. "Uvijek vjerni tebi" Released: 3 May 2012

Ora et labora is the seventh studio album by the Croatian singer-songwriter Marko Perković Thompson, released on 10 April 2013. All songs on the album were written by Perković and Tiho Orlić.

== Themes ==
The album featured Christian and Catholic themes, as well as Croatian nationalist elements, like most of Perković's music. The title of the album serves as the core theme that is reiterated in both the first ("Sokolov krik") and last ("Put u raj") song. Many songs are directed at or offer prayers to God, such as "Maranatha" ("Maranatha") and "Uvijek vjerni tebi" ("Always Faithful to You"). Other songs include historical elements about Croatia, such as "Bosna" ("Bosnia") and "Bog i Hrvati" ("God and the Croats"), which are also the two longest songs on the album. Perković is also critical of so-called "pro-Yugoslavian communist sentiments" in modern-day Croatia, even referencing Stjepan Radić's famous 24 November 1918 speech about Croatian people being led into the creation of Yugoslavia like "geese rushing into the fog."

== Reception ==
The album received instant commercial success, topping charts in Croatia as well as other countries such as Germany, Sweden and Austria.

== Tracks ==
All tracks are written by Marko Perković, except where noted, and produced by Tiho Orlić.

No.	Title	Lyrics	Music	Length
1.	"Sokolov krik"	Perković	Perković; Orlić	4:39
2.	"Dobrodošli"			5:48
3.	"Bog i Hrvati"			9:28
4.	"Zapali vatru"			4:18
5.	"Maranatha"	Ante Ivas	Perković	5:36
6.	"Uvijek vjerni tebi"			5:34
7.	"Bosna"			8:50
8.	"Samo je ljubav tajna dvaju svjetova"			5:50
9.	"Nema predaje"			4:56
10.	"Put u raj"			5:57
Total length:				60:32

- Tracks "Bog i Hrvati", "Maranatha" and "Put u raj" feature uncredited guest vocals from Branka Pleština.
