= Marko Perković =

Croatian singer-songwriter (born 1966)

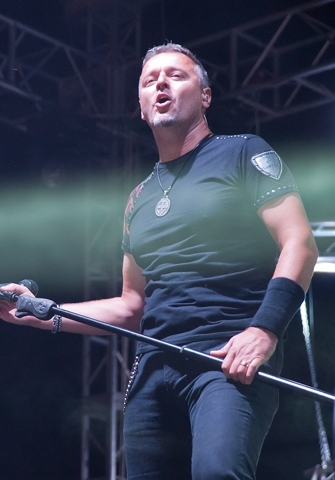
- Perković performing in 2013

Background information
- Also known as: Thompson
- Born: Marko Perković; 27 October 1966 (age 60); Čavoglave, SR Croatia, SFR Yugoslavia
- Genres: Pop rock; folk rock; Christian rock
- Occupation: Singer-songwriter
- Instrument: Vocals
- Works: Discography
- Years active: 1991–present
- Label: Croatia
- Website: thompson.hr
- Spouses: Danijela Martinović (m. 1995; div. 1998); Sandra Rogić (m. 2003)
- Military career
- Allegiance: Republic of Croatia
- Branch: Croatian National Guard; Croatian Army
- Service years: 1991, 1995
- Unit: Čavoglave Battalion

Marko Perković (born 27 October 1966), better known by his stage name Thompson, is a Croatian far-right nationalist rock singer-songwriter. Born in the village of Čavoglave, he participated in the Croatian War of Independence (1991–1995), during which he started his musical career with the nationalist song "Bojna Čavoglave" in 1991. He achieved commercial success during the late 1990s and early 2000s, with the albums Vjetar s Dinare (1998) and E, moj narode (2002). His domestic success continued with Bilo jednom u Hrvatskoj (2006), Ora et labora (2013), and Hodočasnik (2025). Perković leans strongly into traditional themes, singing about the Croatian homeland, family, and Christianity.

His song "Lijepa li si" is often used in sports events. Since 2005 he has organized an unofficial celebration of Croatian Victory Day in his birthplace of Čavoglave. On 5 July 2025, Perković's concert at the Zagreb Hippodrome broke the world record for the highest number of concert tickets ever sold and the most attended ticketed concert ever, at half a million.

During his career, Perković has attracted controversy in the media over his alleged sympathies for the World War II-era Croatian fascist Ustaše regime—which he denies—resulting in occasional banned performances in several European countries.

== Early life ==
Perković was born on 27 October 1966 in Čavoglave (at the time SR Croatia, SFR Yugoslavia). He attended high school in the city of Split. In 1991, Croatia declared independence from Yugoslavia, prompting the Croatian War of Independence. Perković joined the Croatian forces and used the American Thompson submachine gun during his time in the war, which became his nickname and eventual stage name.

== Career ==
=== Beginning and Moli mala (1991–1995) ===
It was while he was defending his home village that Perković became inspired to write one of the most popular songs during the war, "Bojna Čavoglave" ("Čavoglave battalion"), which launched his music career. The song portrays Perković and his comrades defending the village of Čavoglave from Serb rebel forces. It was first played on Radio Split on New Year's Eve 1991, and two weeks later, it won the radio station's contest for "most patriotic song". Eduard Gracin, music editor for Radio Split at the time, reportedly said that Perković had no intention to profit from it or to pursue a music career. A music video, filmed by a local television station, aired on Croatian Radiotelevision, and the newspapers Slobodna Dalmacija and Nedjeljna Dalmacija helped popularize it. The song quickly became a symbol of Croatian nationalism, and it helped raise the morale of Croatian soldiers; it eventually became Perković's trademark.

In 1992, Perković released his debut album, Moli mala ("Pray, Baby"), on Croatia Records, with producer Tonči Huljić. It includes contributions from his future wife, pop singer Danijela Martinović. The songs, based on his experiences, focused on heartbreak and war. By this time, Perković had left the army, and he performed with other musicians as part of the anti-war concert tour Rock za Hrvatsku, though he briefly returned to military service in 1995 to participate in Operation Storm.

=== Breakthrough with Geni kameni and E, moj narode (1995–2005) ===
In 1995, Perković started working on his second studio album, Vrijeme škorpiona, which he released the same year. The song "Anica − Kninska kraljica" gained attention for its patriotic theme. The following year, he issued the record Geni kameni, with the title track becoming another breakthrough. Through his subsequent albums, Vjetar s Dinare in 1998 and E, moj narode in 2002, Perković became a symbol of Croatian patriotism. His song "Lijepa li si" became an unofficial Croatian anthem, and he later re-recorded it with Alen Vitasović, Mladen Grdović, Mate Bulić, Miroslav Škoro, and Giuliano. In 2011, it was named the best Croatian patriotic song by Narodni radio. Other songs from E, moj narode gained significant popularity, including "Prijatelji", "Neću izdat ja", "Moj Ivane", and "Iza devet sela", which interpolates ABBA's "Super Trouper". The album was certified diamond in Croatia, with over 60,000 copies sold.

After the 2000 Croatian parliamentary election, a left-wing government was formed, led by the president of the Social Democratic Party, Ivica Račan, last secretary-general of the League of Communists of Croatia and a prominent leader in Croatia's push for independence. Perković experienced a boost in popularity after embracing right-wing critics of Račan's cabinet, who protested the government's cooperation with the International Criminal Tribunal for the former Yugoslavia (ICTY) in extraditing indicted war criminals. During this period, Perković made obscene comments about Račan and then-Croatian President, Stjepan Mesić, in his concerts.

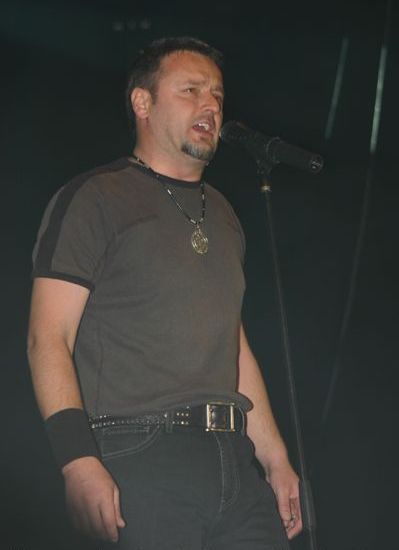
Perković in Frankfurt, 2007

Perković toured to promote E, moj narode. During a concert at Stadion Poljud in Split, attended by some 40,000 spectators, he stated that his songs mark his "three loves: God, homeland, and family". The event sparked controversy, however: two seats in the audience were reserved for Mirko Norac (a convicted war criminal who was on trial at the time) and Ante Gotovina (found not guilty in 2012 on all charges by an appeals panel at the ICTY, but at the time a fugitive). At the beginning of the concert, just moments before Perković stepped onstage, the audience sang the Ustaše song "Evo zore, evo dana".

In 2003, Perković released the greatest hits album Sve najbolje. In 2004, he collaborated on several songs on then-Thompson bassist Tiho Orlić's solo album Tiho. In May 2005, Perković performed in Australia at Sydney's Entertainment Centre and Melbourne's Vodafone Arena.

=== Bilo jednom u Hrvatskoj and mainstream success (2006–2008) ===
Perković's sixth studio album, Bilo jednom u Hrvatskoj, was released in December 2006 and soon became his best-selling record, with over 120,000 copies sold. Perković subsequently announced a tour of Croatia and select European cities, beginning after the Lenten season through summer, culminating with a performance at Stadion Maksimir in Zagreb, in front of 60,000 people. As part of the second leg of the tour, Perković performed at Split's Stadion Stari plac in front of 25,000 people, and the show was recorded for the live album Bilo jednom u Hrvatskoj: Split – Stari plac.

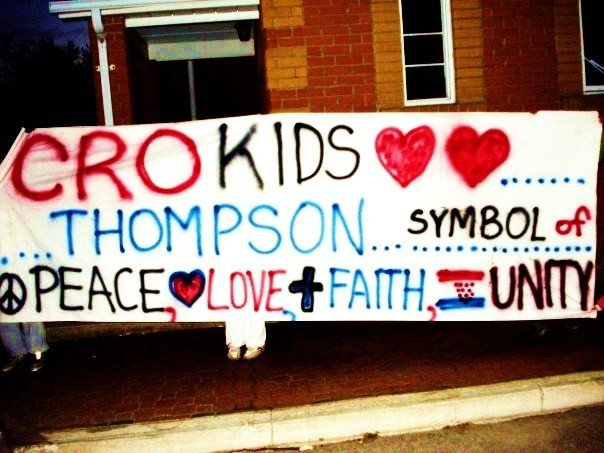
Banner from Toronto-area concert

Perković had two shows scheduled in November 2007 in New York City, which provoked protests from several Jewish groups, who called on the Archdiocese of New York to stop the performances. The archdiocese declined, however, reportedly finding no evidence that the singer promoted neo-Nazism. His concert in Toronto, Canada, attracted 5,000 people to the Croatian center where it was held, after the original venue, Kool Haus, with a capacity of 2,500, cancelled.

Perković continued the tour with shows in various Bosnian-Herzegovinian cities, including Mostar, Tomislavgrad, Novi Travnik, Široki Brijeg, and Čapljina. His last performance in Croatia, before heading to Australia, was Cibona's annual Christmas benefit show at Dražen Petrović Basketball Hall, with proceeds going to the Zagreb Cathedral. The Australian leg included shows at Melbourne's Festival Hall, Sydney's Sydney United Sports Centre on New Year's Eve, Adelaide, and Perth. The B'nai B'rith Anti-Defamation Commission of Australia lobbied to prevent the singer and his band from receiving Australian visas, but government officials found they did not violate any terms that would prevent them from visiting Australia. After several guest appearances in Croatia, the rapper Shorty was confirmed to be joining Perković for the Australian leg of the tour, which collectively drew in 22,000 fans at four shows.

The tour continued in 2008, with shows in Rijeka, Krapina, and Čakovec, before pausing for the group's usual Lenten break, which was followed by performances in Zadar's Jazine Arena and in Gothenburg, Sweden. A show in Nova Gradiška had proceeds going to the construction of a local Catholic church. After Nova Gradiška, Perković went to Varaždin, Karlovac, and Županja. Local authorities threatened to block his 21 May concert in Stuttgart, Germany. However, they backed down after the concert's German Croat backers threatened legal action against the city and translated twenty songs into German for the authorities' benefit. The tour officially ended on 28 December 2008, at the Borovo Naselje venue where it had begun, with profits going to the Vukovar Hospital.

It was estimated by Perković's staff that close to 950,000 tickets were sold during the two-year tour. In June 2008, Perković was named the third most influential person in Croatian show business by Globus magazine.

=== Ora et labora and tour (2013–2022) ===
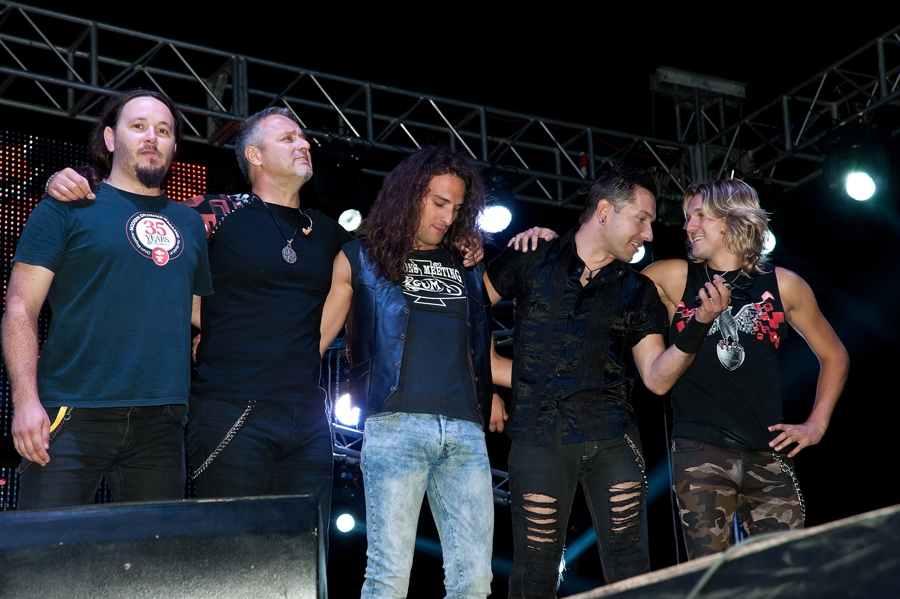
Perković (second from the left) and his band in 2013

Perković released his seventh studio album, Ora et labora, on 10 April 2013, to critical acclaim. It contained heavy Christian and Catholic themes. The record topped iTunes charts in Germany, Switzerland, and Austria. Perković subsequently launched the Ora et labora Tour, on 22 June 2013, at the Zenith in Munich, Germany, in front of 4,000 people. The tour continued with a concert at Stadion Poljud in Split on 30 June, which was reportedly attended by 50,000 spectators.

In 2019, on behalf of the city of Split and its veterans, on the eve of Croatian Victory Day, Perković held a concert in front of 80,000 people. In 2022, Perković stopped performing due to his son's health issues, returning two years later, upon his son's insistence.

=== Hodočasnik and Zagreb Hippodrome concert (2024–present) ===
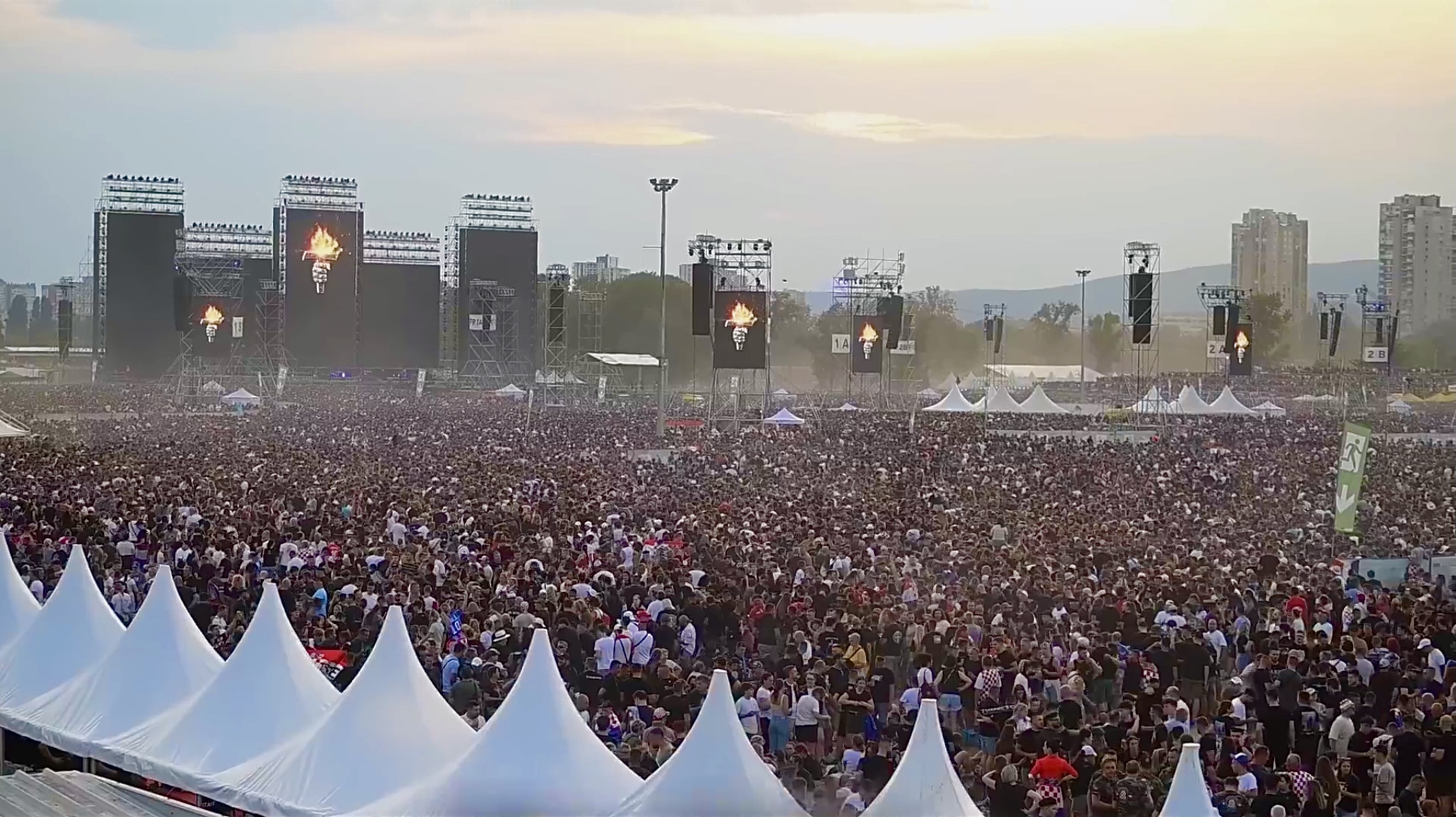

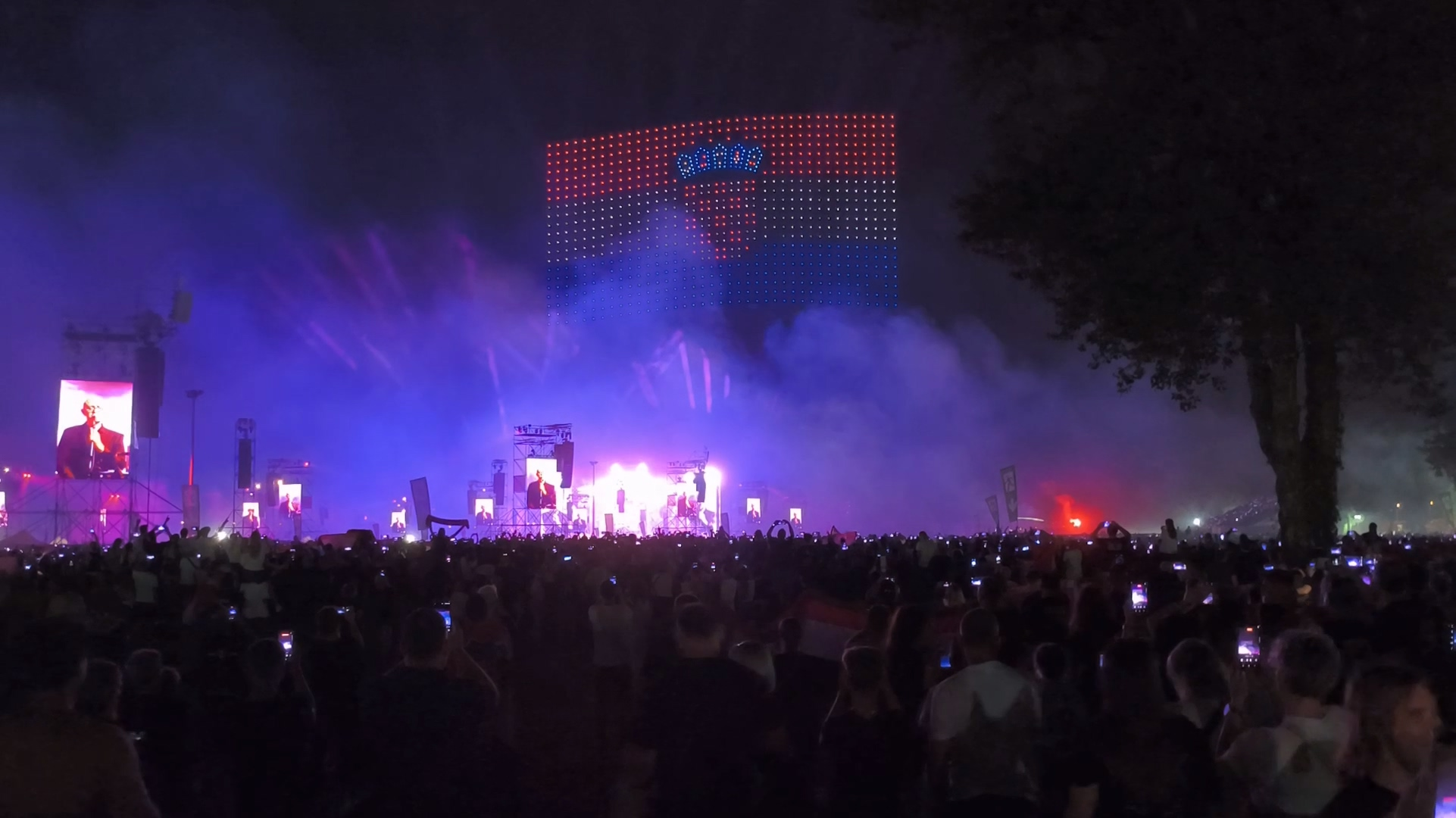
2025 record-breaking concert at the Zagreb Hippodrome

In August 2024, Perković issued the single "Ako ne znaš šta je bilo" and held a concert in Dugopolje, in front of 40,000 people. His eighth studio album, Hodočasnik, was released in June 2025, through Croatia Records. His first in 12 years, the record quickly became one of the most promoted releases of his career. It debuted at number one on the official Croatian music charts and remained there for weeks. In three weeks, it became the best-selling domestic album of the first half of 2025.

In January 2025, Perković's management team submitted a request to rent the Zagreb Hippodrome, with the aim of organizing a major concert. In March, the ticket sales company Entrio confirmed that 281,774 tickets were sold on the first day of sales, officially making it the concert with the largest number of tickets sold in the world. After a second batch of tickets went on sale, the concert sold another 160,000 in a single day. In June, a Dubai-based entertainment and stagehand company approached Perković's management and began setup at the Zagreb Hippodrome. The stage stood 33 m high and 150 m wide, with five LED screens and thousands of drones, and it quickly became one of the most logistically complex productions ever held in Croatia, with 14,000 police, firefighter, emergency medical service, and Red Cross personnel being involved in the event.

The concert was held on 5 July 2025, selling an estimated total of 485,000 tickets, with Perković's manager claiming a total of 504,000 attendees at the event, breaking the record for the highest number of concert tickets ever sold and the most attended ticketed concert ever. A makeshift field hospital was set up in preparation for the event, including 200 patient beds and approximately 100 medical staff, who were supported by 17 ambulance teams stationed around the concert venue, along with 175 members of the Red Cross. The city of Zagreb implemented a state of heightened preparedness for the concert, with police restricting traffic in the neighbourhoods surrounding the venue. Fans from 45 countries came to the concert, and the largest number of foreign tickets were sold in Vienna, Munich, Mostar, and Graz, followed by Argentina, Canada, the United States, Russia, Australia, and China.

A follow-up concert was held on 4 August 2025 at the Sinj hippodrome, attracting around 150,000 attendees, further solidifying the Hodočasnik Tour as one of the most attended in Croatian music history. It continued from November 2025, with two sold-out concerts in each city of Osijek, Varaždin, Zadar, Zagreb (second banned), Poreč, Split, and Rijeka, and is set to wrap up in February 2026.

== Lyrics and themes ==
Perković's material is often marked by social, historical, and religious themes, and it includes elements of folklore. His music often employs politicized narratives that blame "communists" in cooperation with historic enemies of Croatia. Notable songs include: on homeland—"Lijepa li si" ("How Beautiful You Are"), "Ako ne znaš šta je bilo" ("If You Don't Know What Happened"); history—"Dolazak Hrvata" ("The Arrival of Croats"), "Kletva kralja Zvonimira" ("King Zvonimir's Curse"), "Nepročitano pismo" ("Unread Letter"); on politics—"Bojna Čavoglave" ("Čavoglave Battalion"), "Ne varaj me" ("Don't Deceive Me"), "Neka ni'ko ne dira u moj mali dio svemira" ("May Nobody Touch My Little Part of the Universe"); on religion and love—"Radost s visina" ("Joy From the Heavens"), "Neću izdat ja" ("I Won't Betray"), "Dan dolazi" ("The Day is Coming"), "Početak" ("The Beginning"), "Samo je ljubav tajna dvaju svjetova" ("Only Love is the Secret of Two Worlds"), "Put u raj" ("Way to Heaven"); family and birthplace—"Zaustavi se, vjetre" ("Halt, Wind"), "Iza devet sela" ("After Nine Villages"), "Moj dida i ja" ("My Grandpa and I"), "Sine moj" ("O, My Son").

Perković has mentioned being a fan of such bands as Nightwish, Iron Maiden, AC/DC, and Dream Theater, among others. In 2007, a Washington Post writer described the New York stop on the Bilo jednom u Hrvatskoj tour as sounding "like Iron Maiden doing Eastern European folk".

At the Porin Croatian music awards, he received a nomination in 1999 for "Zaustavi se, vjetre", two nominations in 2003, including for E, moj narode as best album and "Iza devet sela" as hit song of the year. In 2014, he received the award for hit song of the year for "Samo je ljubav tajna dvaju svjetova", and in 2025, he obtained three nominations—for best song, best vocal collaboration, and best music video for "Ako ne znaš šta je bilo". He has also received Cesarica awards for the song "Ako ne znaš šta je bilo" for Hit of the Month in August 2024, "Nepročitano pismo" in March, "Oluja" ("Storm") in May, and "Ravnoteža" ("Balance") in July 2025.

His song "Lijepa li si" is traditionally played as a "national song" after and at halftime at all matches of the Croatia national football team. His 2025 song "Ako ne znaš šta je bilo" became closely associated with the Croatia national handball team.

== Controversies ==
=== Ustaša ideology ===
Perković's alleged sympathies and glorification of the WWII-era Ustaše have led to accusations by many sources, including the Simon Wiesenthal Center, of being a "fascist singer". Jurica Pavičić and Ivo Goldstein have described him as a "propagator of Ustaša ideology" and a "rural fascist", but at the same time a bearer of a "hot, offensive counterculture that can burn promoters of liberal democratic values". Ivo Banac has stated that Perković's popularity is related to the Croatian failure to confront its Yugoslavian communist past and symbols, that prohibiting his concerts is a "violation of his civil rights", which is only making him a "martyr", but also that Perković, contrary to his claimed intentions, is only providing material for prejudice about Croats. Writing for Globus in 2018, Ivo Goldstein explained that Perković's authenticity as a war veteran and singer in the context of the 1990s had broad sympathy, but that his rise in popularity is related to the drastic change in Croatian politics during the early 2000s, when the right-wing Croatian Democratic Union lost and the left-wing Social Democratic Party of Croatia paved the way for Croatian Europeanisation. In such a moment, Perković became a person who managed to shape an attractive nationalist ideology and vision with right-wing values through folk rock, while also infiltrating provocative and strategic flirting with Ustaša ideology into the Croatian mainstream through the celebration of Croatianism. Joe Orovic of The New York Times concluded that Perković "uses the salute and nationalist rhetoric to cast himself as a guardian of Croatian heritage". In 2025, Hrvoje Klasić of France24 stated that the singer's popularity does not reflect an increasing support for far-right movements in mainstream society and that the vast majority of fans perceive Perković as a "patriot, presenting traditional values like homeland, religion, family". Guy Delauney of the BBC expressed that Perković's rhetoric "exposes a divided society".

The most notable accusations against Perković relate to the song 1991 "Bojna Čavoglave", which opens with the WWII NDH fascist salute "Za dom spremni" ("for home ready"), equivalent to the Nazi salute. The salute was commonly used by Croatian soldiers and the short-lived Croatian Defence Forces during the Croatian War of Independence to boost morale against Serb forces. Critics note that its use outside the context of the war and time period relativizes and normalizes Ustaša ideology in Croatia. The salute has a complicated legal status in Croatia, and parallels were made with use of the Ukrainian salute Slava Ukraini during the ongoing Russo-Ukrainian war. In 2008, Perković stated that "if they ban it, I won't sing it, because I fought for a state governed by the rule of law". In 2020, after a public and legal dispute, a High Misdemeanour Court allowed Perković to use the salute in the song and in concerts.

During the 1990s, Perković was publicly supportive of the Croatian Party of Rights (HSP), a far-right political party often described by its critics as neo-fascist. One of his more notable appearances took place at a political rally in Split in 1992, where he performed songs associated with the Ustaše.

In 1996, Perković visited Vancouver, Canada, at the invitation of members of HSP. During the visit, he made statements later published by the Croatian weekly magazine Arena, in which he said that he collected and received gifts depicting Ante Pavelić and other Ustaše figures, and that he intended to place an original Ustaše flag, allegedly smuggled from Europe to North America, in a planned museum in Čavoglave. Photographs published alongside the article showed him with portraits of Pavelić and Ustaše military commander Jure Francetić.

In early 1997, following his appearance on Croatian Radiotelevision in a programme hosted by Željka Ogresta, Perković faced cancelled television appearances after reiterating positive views toward the Ustaše and Ante Pavelić. In subsequent interviews with Slobodna Dalmacija, Globus, and Nedjeljna Dalmacija, he stated that he respected Pavelić, expressed sympathy for the Ustaše movement, and claimed that the Independent State of Croatia was a prerequisite for modern Croatian statehood.

In the early 2000s, Perković was repeatedly associated with Ustaše symbols and chants at his concerts. Media reports described audiences chanting "Ustaše" and displaying extremist slogans, while Perković stated in interviews that such expressions did not bother him, saying that he viewed them as part of Croatian history or expressions of patriotism. In one interview with Večernji list, he stated, "Why shouldn't they shout Ustaše? ... That is our history", and he acknowledged that he did not object to Ustaše songs being performed at his concerts.

In December 2003, Perković generated controversy by allegedly performing "Jasenovac i Gradiška Stara", a song that openly glorifies the Ustaše regime, particularly its crimes against humanity during World War II in the Jasenovac and Stara Gradiška concentration camps, in which the genocide of Serbs took place. However, the authenticity of the audio recording, found on the internet by journalists from the Croatian left-leaning tabloid Index.hr, was never confirmed. Perković first denied, then acknowledged on his official website in 2004, and later continued to deny performing the song, claiming it was a montage made and shared by the journalists Denis Latin and Aleksandar Stanković from Croatian Radiotelevision, and part of a wider conspiracy by UDBA. An organizer for a Thompson tour of New York City in 2007 defended Perković, claiming the musician did not write the song nor is a version of it available on any of his albums. In his 2020 interview for Frankfurter Allgemeine Zeitung, Perković condemned the song, calling it "completely contrary to my worldview and the ideology I belong to. Being associated with that song is offensive to me", and he called the lyrics "disgusting".

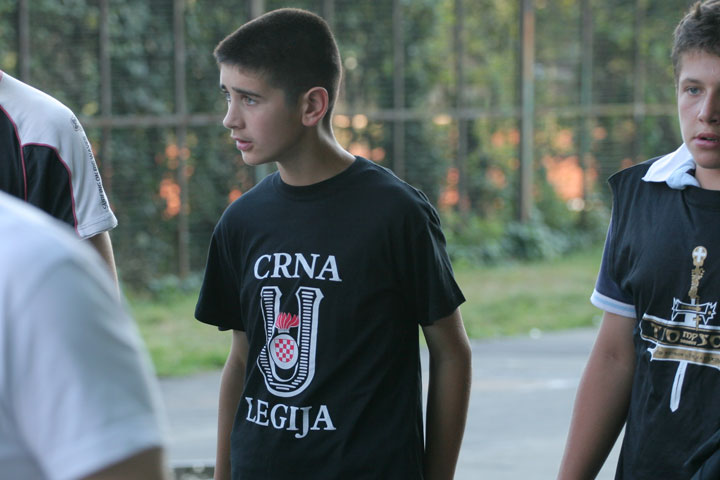
Young boy wearing a shirt with a Black Legion, Ustaše Militia sign at a Thompson concert at Stadion Maksimir in 2007

In 2007, the Anti Defamation League reported that many Thompson concert attendees, primarily young people, wore clothing with Ustaše symbols and carried banners with "anti-Serb, anti-semitic, and anti-Roma rhetoric". They also performed Nazi salutes in response to the band's "traditional 'war cry' of the Ustašes" at the beginning of a concert. Ustaše material was also sold at venues. In 2008, in a conference before the free concert at Ban Jelačić Square in Zagreb, Perković stated, "we don't want fascist, Nazi, communist, Bolshevik symbols at the concert. As a Croatian defender, I am honored to be able to perform on the main square of all Croats. The victory of the Croatian army in the war deserves a dignified concert". As a response to such accusations, Perković also claimed that he did not see Ustaše iconography at concerts, that individual incidents were not his responsibility, but that he condemned such behavior. However, the incidents continued: for example, in 2015, Perković performed in Knin in front of some 80,000 spectators for the 20th-anniversary celebration of the Croatian military's Operation Storm, with many in attendance singing pro-Ustaše songs and chanting slogans such as "kill a Serb" and "here we go Ustaše". During the Zagreb Hippodrome concert in 2025, Perković also wore a t-shirt that read "03941158", the inmate number of Croatian political activist Zvonko Bušić. In 1976, Bušić hijacked TWA Flight 355 and planted a bomb at Grand Central Terminal in New York City that killed a police officer attempting to disarm it, an act intended to draw international attention to Croatia's position under Yugoslav rule. News coverage of the concert showed attendees performing pro-Nazi and Ustaše salutes. In the following months, as the Ustaše salute and historical revisionism increasingly appeared in public discourse and within the Croatian parliament, United Against Fascism Marches took place in November 2025.

In 2019, Perković gave an interview to the German daily Frankfurter Allgemeine Zeitung, but instead of releasing the authorized full transcript, the newspaper published a critical article about him in 2020, causing Perković to feel deceived and publishing the full interview on his website. In it and elsewhere, Perković has renounced and distanced himself from the Ustaše and their leader Ante Pavelić on repeated occasions, and he has additionally condemned all totalitarian regimes. Perković has claimed that his use of the salute "Za dom spremni" is exclusively in the patriotic context of the Croatian War of Independence, and that in the last decades, there has been a "leftist Yugo-nostalgic conspiracy" of identifying Croatian patriotism with fascism and that the anti-fascist and progressive associations who are trying to ban his activity are closely related to "Yugoslavian communist and Greater Serbian" organizations.

=== Banned performances ===
In 2003, Perković was barred from performing in Amsterdam. In response, he told to Croatian newspaper, "It is all to blame on the Jews. I have nothing against them and I did nothing to them. I know that Jesus Christ also did nothing against them, but still they hanged him on the cross. So what can I expect as a small man?" He was also been banned from performing in Switzerland multiple times, including in 2009. Perković's planned 2014 Berlin performance was cancelled, and in 2017, he was barred from performing in Austria. He was banned in Maribor in Slovenia the same year and again in 2020.

The most controversial case in Croatia occurred in the region of Istria, noted for its antifascist history. The town of Umag banned a Thompson concert in July 2008. Afterward, Perković asked for permission to perform at the Pula Arena, Istria's most populous city and biggest concert venue. When this was denied, he initiated and lost court actions against the city for "human rights violations". After the court decision, Perković's lawyer declared that sooner or later, he would perform in Pula. In late December 2008, Perković managed to secure permission to organize a concert in Pazin, despite fierce opposition from the Istrian Democratic Assembly (IDS), the county's leading political party. These attacks led to an increase in tensions, which reached their climax on the night of 11 December, when an explosive device was ignited outside the concert venue. Although IDS MP Damir Kajin accused Perković's fans, it turned out that the offender, Vilim Bon, who was injured in the conflagration and arrested by police, was acting to stop the concert. The show took place as planned on 20 December, followed by two more on 21 and 22 December, due to reported demand. Perković was once again barred from performing in Pula in 2025, but he played two concerts at Žatika Sport Centre in Poreč.

In December 2025, despite being told by local authorities in Zagreb not to use the Ustaše salute in the song "Bojna Čavoglave", Perković did so regardless on 26 December at Arena Zagreb and was banned from holding a second concert the following day. This caused a political controversy, with Perković and his lawyer announcing legal action against the mayor, Tomislav Tomašević, and calling for his political overthrow together with his We Can! party. The dispute with the city continued on 2 February 2026 with the welcoming of the men's national handball team at Ban Jelačić Square, leading to controversial intervention of the Croatian government in the event's organization.

== Personal life ==
In the mid-1990s, Perković was in a relationship with Croatian singer Danijela Martinović. He is married to Sandra Rogić, a Croatian-Canadian he met during a concert in Canada. They have five children.

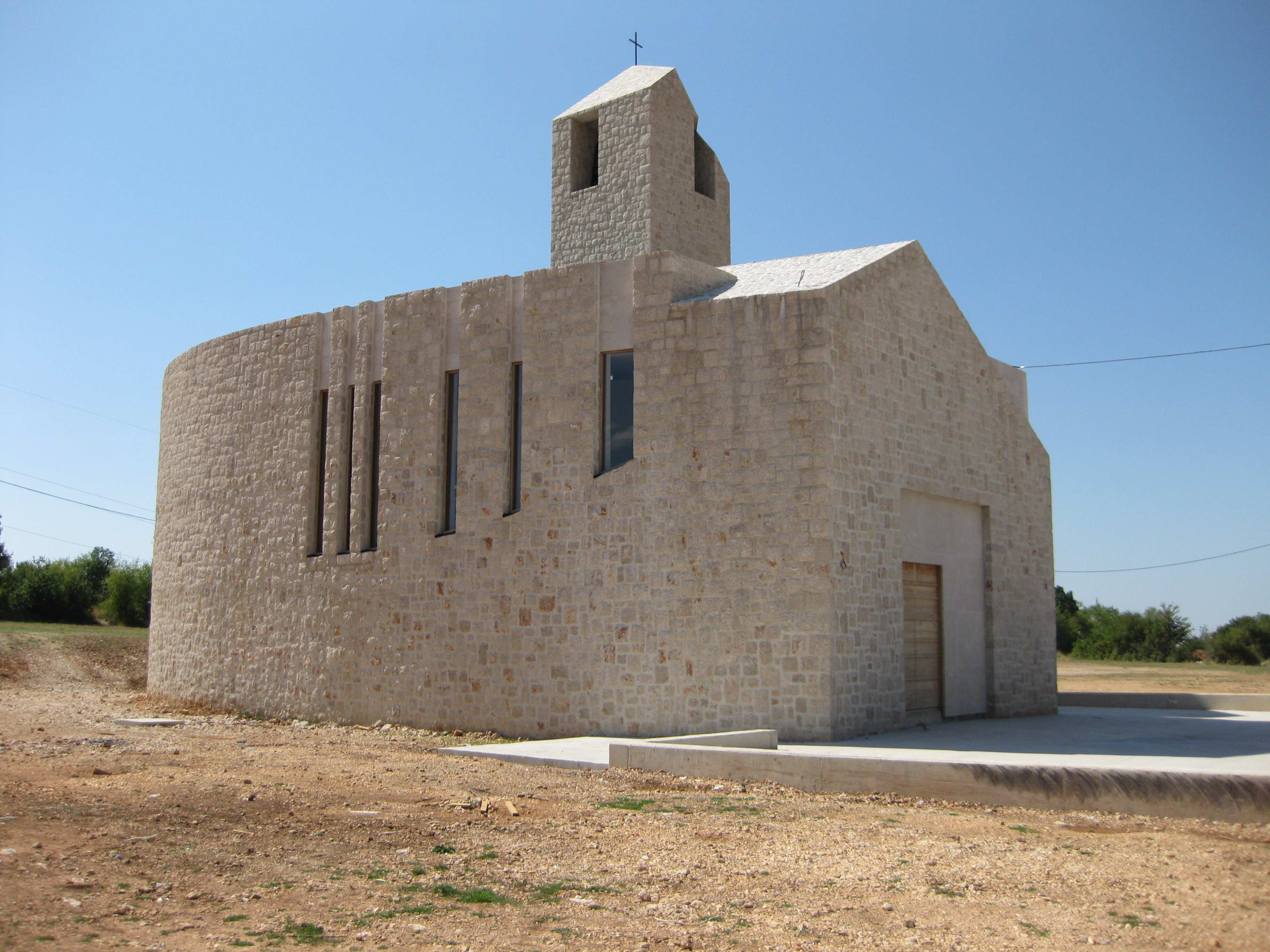
The Church of Croatian Martyrs in Čavoglave, built on Perković's initiative and funding

In 2004, it was reported that Perković bought a 20% share of the radio station Narodni radio. The same year, Perković initiated and funded the building of the Church of Croatian Martyrs in Čavoglave. In December 2009, Pope Benedict XVI received Perković for an audience.

Perković has on several occasions expressed political support for Croatian conservative candidates and parties who participated in the creation of the Croatian state, fought in its defense during the Croatian War of Independence, and have Christian values and admiration for Croatian veterans.

== Awards and nominations ==
=== Porin ===
Year	Category	Performer / work	Result	Ref.
1999	Song of the year	"Zaustavi se vjetre"	Nominated	
2003	Song of the year	"Iza devet sela"	Nominated	
2003	Album of the year	E, moj narode	Nominated	
2014	Song of the year	"Samo je ljubav tajna dvaju svjetova"	Won	

== Discography ==
Studio albums

- Moli mala (1992)
- Vrijeme škorpiona (1995)
- Geni kameni (1996)
- Vjetar s Dinare (1998)
- E, moj narode (2002)
- Bilo jednom u Hrvatskoj (2006)
- Ora et labora (2013)
- Hodočasnik (2025)

== See also ==
- Baja Mali Knindža – Bosnian Serb nationalist singer-songwriter
