= Blatina (disambiguation) =

Blatina may refer to:

- Blatina, village in Montenegro
- Blatina, wine from Herzegovina (Bosnia and Herzegovina)
- Blatina, stream in Little Carpathians region (Slovakia)
