= Sve najbolje =

Sve najbolje may refer to:

- Sve najbolje, a 2001 greatest hits album by Bosnian Croat singer Mate Bulić
- Sve najbolje, a 2003 greatest hits album by Croatian singer Marko Perković
