= Our Lady of Medjugorje =

Alleged visions of Mary, mother of Jesus

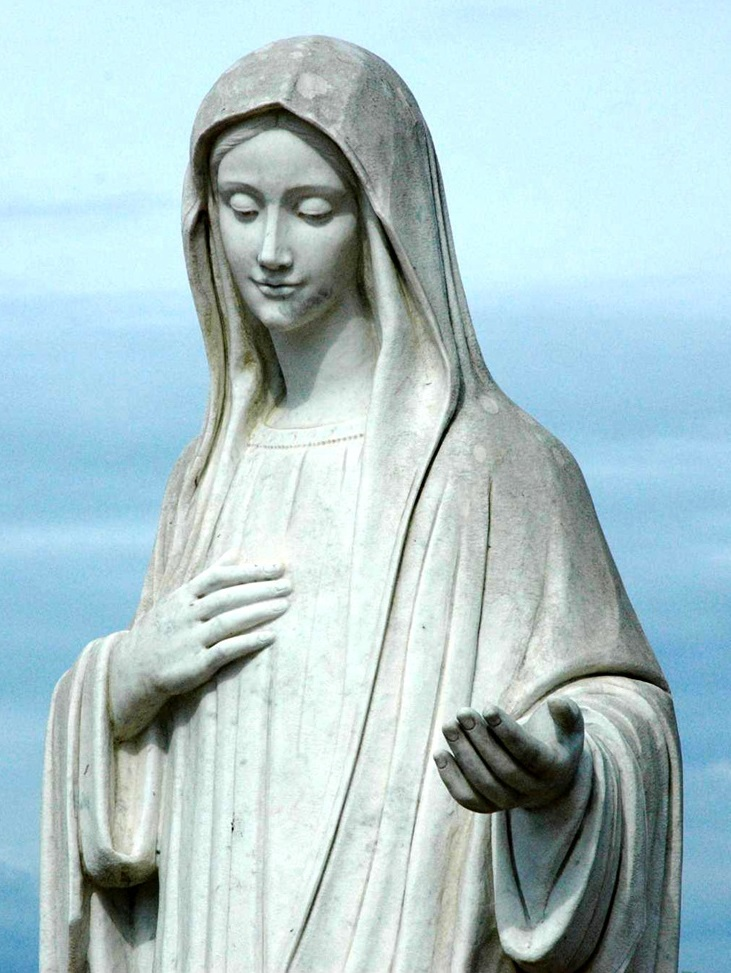
- Statue of Our Lady of Medjugorje
- Location: Medjugorje, Bosnia and Herzegovina and a number of other locations
- Date: 24 June 1981–present
- Witness: Ivan Dragičević; Ivanka Ivanković; Jakov Čolo; Marija Pavlović; Mirjana Dragičević; Vicka Ivanković; Jelena Vasilj (only locutions); Marijana Vasilj (only locutions)
- Type: Marian apparition
- Shrine: Medjugorje Parish Church

Our Lady of Medjugorje (Croatian: Međugorska Gospa), also called Queen of Peace (Croatian: Kraljica mira), is the title given to a series of visions of the Virgin Mary, mother of Jesus, which are said to have occurred for six Herzegovinian Croat children in Medjugorje, Bosnia and Herzegovina (Note: At the time in the Socialist Federal Republic of Yugoslavia), beginning in 1981. They reported there that the Virgin Mary had said: "What I started in Fatima, I will complete in Medjugorje. My Heart will triumph". Those claiming to be the visionaries often refer to the apparition as the Gospa, which is a Croatian archaism for 'lady'.

After considering the significant number of people who go to Medjugorje and the abundant "fruits of grace" that have sprung from it, Pope Francis lifted the ban on officially organized pilgrimages in May 2019. This was not to be interpreted as an authentication of known events, which still require examination, according to the Catholic Church.

On September 19, 2024, the Vatican granted "the spiritual event" of Medjugorje a Nihil Obstat, which means Catholics "are authorized to give it their adherence in a prudent manner", encouraging pilgrimages to Medjugorje without entering into the question of alleged apparitions. The Holy See also said believers should not go to Medjugorje for "alleged visionaries" but for the Queen of Peace.

== Background ==
=== Political situation ===
At the time of the reported visions, the village of Medjugorje was located in Bosnia and Herzegovina, part of the Socialist Federal Republic of Yugoslavia, a federation of various Slavic nations. There were tensions among the nations, exacerbated by religious difference: most Croats are Catholic, most Serbs are Eastern Orthodox, while the Bosnians and Herzegovinians are a mix of the two and included a third group—the Bosnian Muslims. The death of President Josip Broz Tito of Yugoslavia in early May 1980 had led to anti-communist backlash and the build up of ethnic tensions, destabilizing the country and moving it towards political, economic, and national collapse. The public debt soared and national dissatisfaction was evident in the 1981 Albanian student protests in Kosovo. After Tito's death, Yugoslavia's security apparatus enhanced its activities against perceived "enemies of the state", especially in Bosnia and Herzegovina, where the apparatus was most loyal to Tito. Such activity was particularly oriented towards the Catholic Church in Herzegovina.

In addition, the election of Pope John Paul II from communist Poland and the Catholic Solidarity Movement intensified the conflict between the Vatican and Soviet-dominated Eastern Europe.

In the 1980s there was a boom of Marian apparitions in Europe, especially in Ireland and Italy. Chris Maunder connects these apparitions, including those in Medjugorje, with the anti-communist movement in Eastern Europe that led to the downfall of communism.

=== Religious situation ===
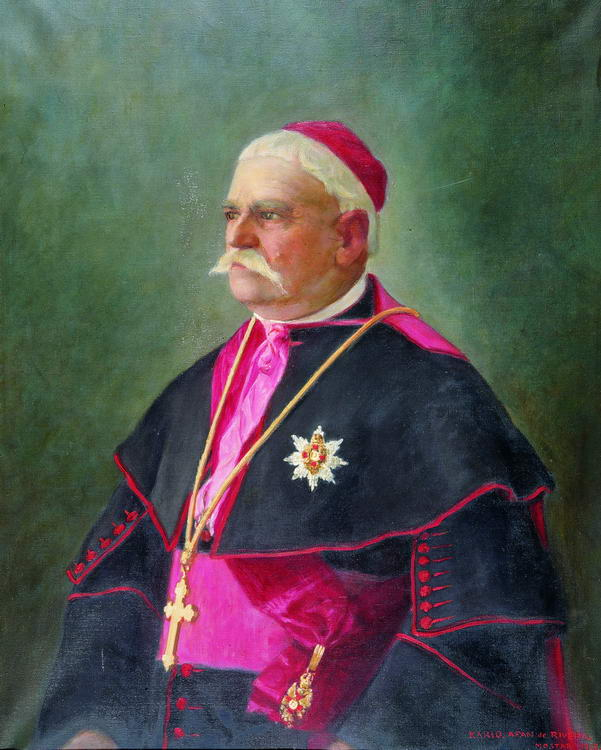
Paškal Buconjić, a Franciscan and the first bishop of Mostar-Duvno established the Parish of Medjugorje

The Franciscan Province of Herzegovina was established in 1843 when it was separated from the Franciscan Province of Bosna Srebrena. In 1846, the Holy See established the Apostolic Vicariate of Herzegovina, which was then part of the Ottoman Empire and it was considered to be a mission area. The first vicars were all Franciscans. In 1881, the area came under the control of the Austro-Hungarian Empire and Pope Leo XIII took steps to establish dioceses and appoint local bishops.

The Franciscans of Herzegovina saw this as a threat, depriving them of a source of income and their role as community social leaders which they attained over centuries of "difficult missionary" work while under Turkish domination.

A jurisdictional conflict arose, known as the Herzegovina Affair or Herzegovina Case which dates back to 1923, when Rome made a decision to have the Franciscans turn over half of the parishes they control to the secular clergy. A smooth transition was inhibited by both a lack of sufficient diocesan clergy and by the resistance of the friars to the divestment of their parishes. The Franciscans complied only partially and have refused to comply with Rome's decisions ever since. Their resistance to this change put them into conflict with the Church's hierarchy, including their Franciscan Order in Rome. Their resistance to comply was against both church authority and canon law.

In 1933 Pope Pius XI requested the whole Catholic world to erect crosses on the dominant mountains in honor of the 1900th anniversary of the crucifixion of Jesus. In 1933 a massive cross was erected by the local Catholic diocese on a mountain near Medjuorje. The 540-metre (1,770 ft) peak was originally named Mount Sipovac but the locals changed the name to Mount Križevac which means 'Mount of the Cross'. They constructed the 10-metre (33 ft) high cross weighing fifteen tons in six weeks, carrying all the building materials on their backs.

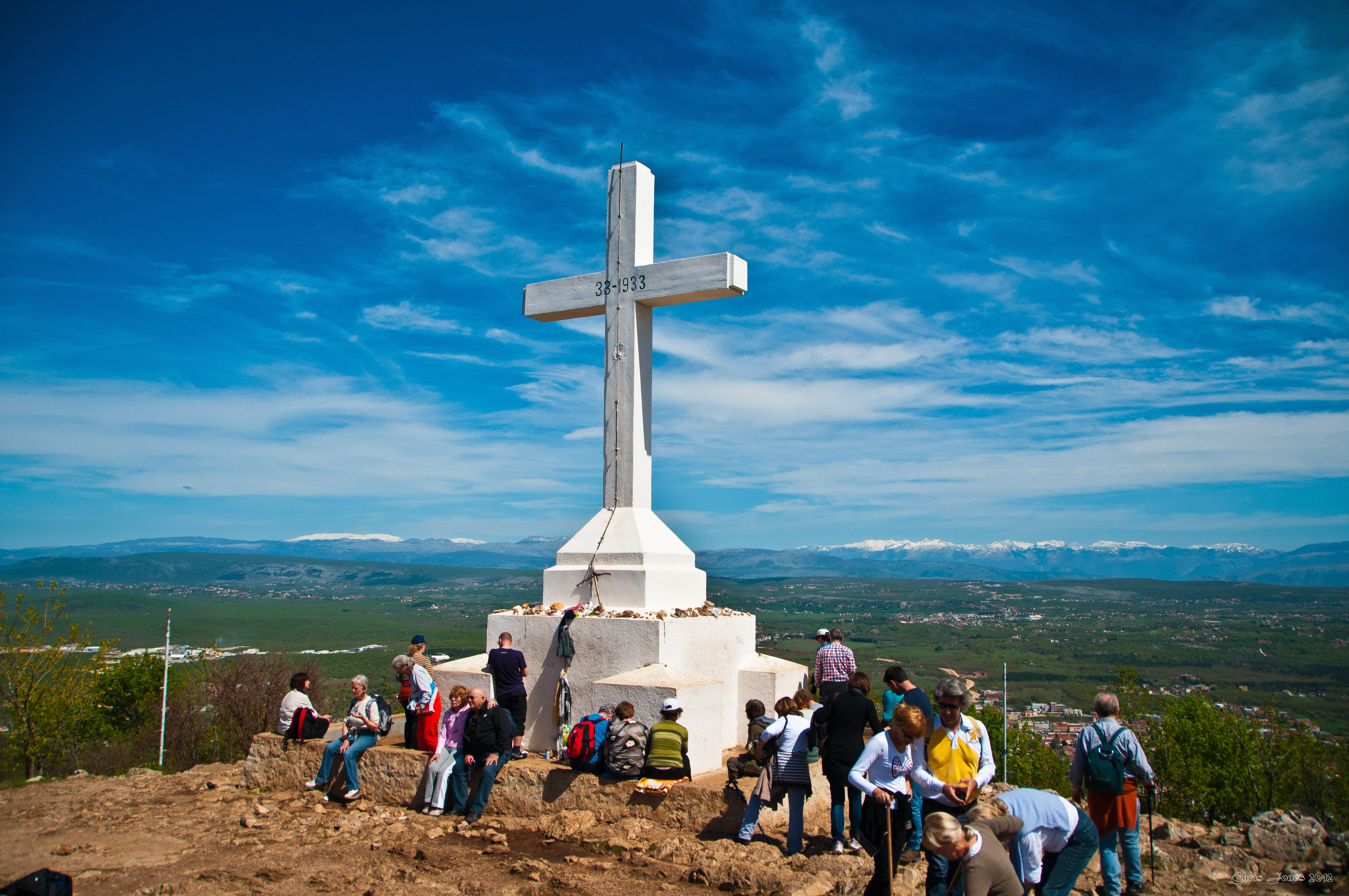
Mount Križevac Cross, Medjugorje

In 1975, Pope Paul VI, in the papal decree Romanis Pontificibus, decreed that the Franciscans must withdraw from most of the parishes in the Diocese of Mostar-Duvno, retaining 30 and leaving 52 to the diocesan clergy. In the 1980s the Franciscans still held 40 parishes under the direction of 80 friars. In August 1980, the new bishop of Mostar, Pavao Žanić, immediately announced that only one quarter of the city would remain under the Franciscans.

The Mostar Cathedral of Mary, Mother of the Church was completed in the summer of 1980.

According to Michael Budde in his book Beyond the Borders of Baptism Catholicity, Allegiances, and Lived Identities, as it gained a national and international reputation, the Medjugorje pilgrimage site became a formidable symbol of the power of religion in the fight against the Communist Yugoslav regime.

== Initial events ==
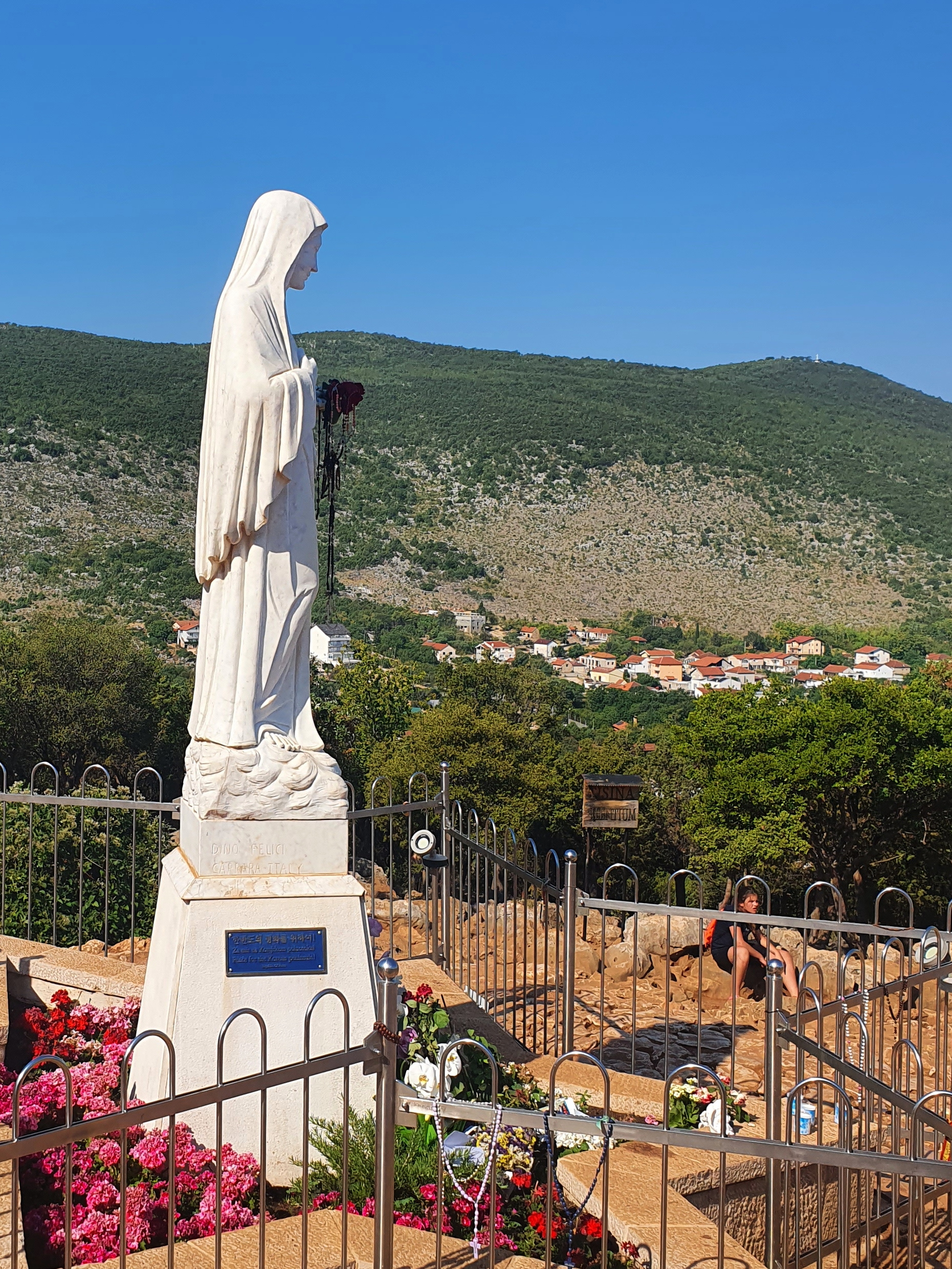
Statue of Virgin Mary at Podbrdo, the reported location of the first Marian apparition

Marija and Jakov during an alleged apparition in the chapel to the right of the altar of the parish Saint James Church in Medjugorje on 7 August 1981

On 24 June 1981 around 6:30 pm, 15-year-old Ivanka Ivanković and her 16-year-old friend Mirjana Dragičević were out walking. According to Ivanka, she noticed the shimmering silhouette of a woman bathed in a brilliant light on nearby Mount Podbrdo. She told Mirjana, but Mirjana scoffed at the idea and they continued walking. The pair met 13-year-old Milka Pavlovic, and later all three reportedly saw the apparition. They were then joined by Vicka Ivanković, 17, who also reportedly saw the apparition and ran off in fright. Vicka later returned with Ivan Dragičević, 16, and Ivan Ivanković, 20, who were picking apples; Ivan Dragičević was so frightened that he dropped his apples and ran. Later, they said they all saw the same apparition. The author T.K. Rousseau has noted that "the Medjugorje visions began only days after Orthodox Serbs commemorated the 40th anniversary of mass killings of Serbs by the Ustaše at Šurmanci during the Second World War."

The six seers told Franciscan friar Father Jozo Zovko, who was the parish priest at St. James Church in Medjugorje, that they had seen the Virgin Mary (Gospa). Zovko was initially skeptical. He noticed that the seers became agitated if anyone hinted that they were lying, and that their physical descriptions of the Gospa were consistent with each other. According to Randall Sullivan, they described her as a young woman about twenty years old with blue eyes, black hair, and "a crown of stars" around her head. They said she wore a white veil and a bluish-grey robe, but that they could not see her feet, as she was hovering above the ground on a white cloud. They said she spoke in a singing voice.

In early July, Zovko abandoned his initial skepticism and embraced the apparitions. Yugoslav officials condemned the reports as a "clerical-nationalist" conspiracy on the part of Croat extremists.

The Mostar Cathedral of Mary, Mother of the Church was completed in the summer of 1980. In order to create the cathedral parish it was decided to split the parish of SS. Peter and Paul. The Franciscans objected to this as being unfair.

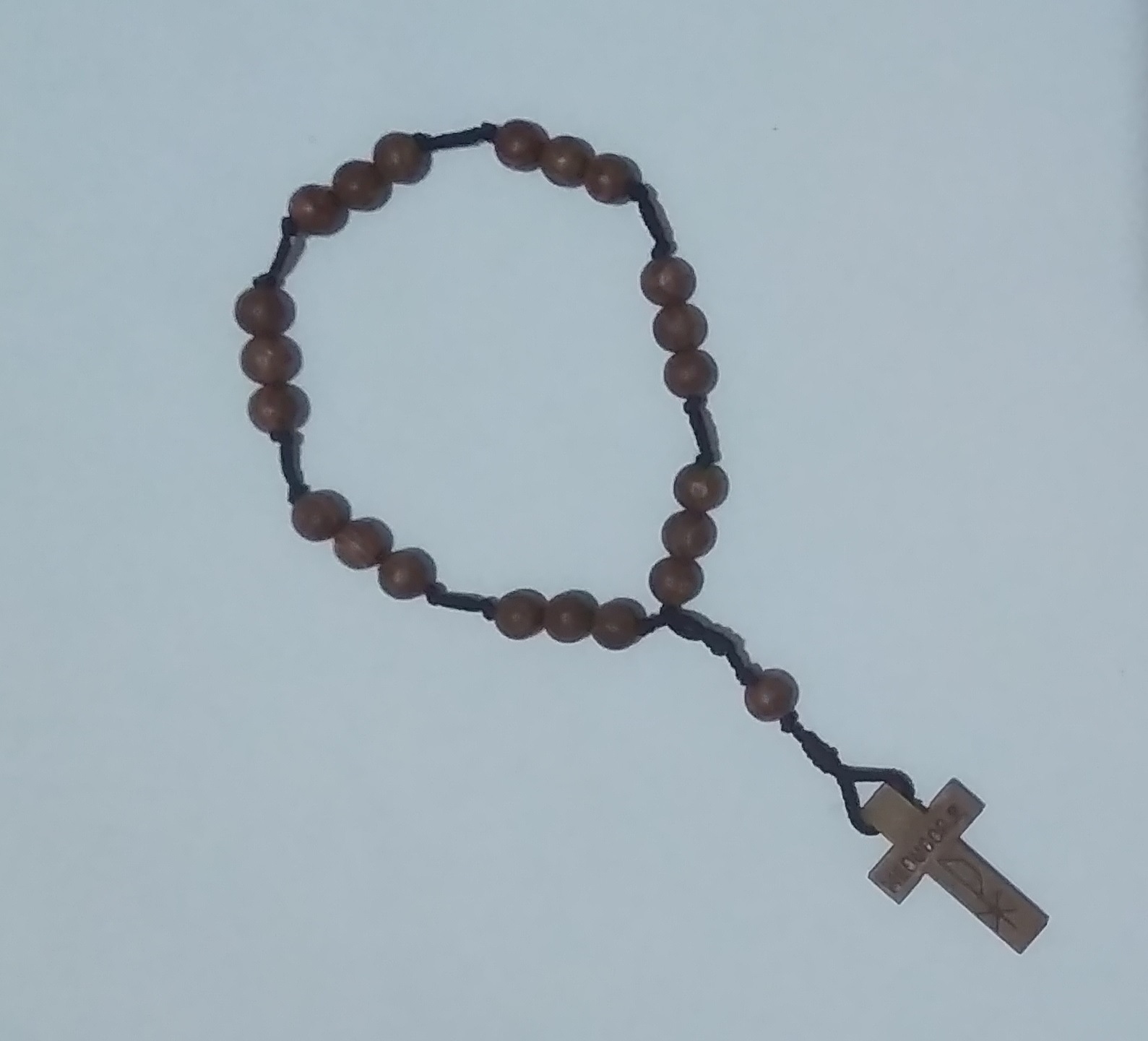
The Peace Rosary of Medjugorje, also known as Peace Chaplet of Medjugorje, recommended by the Virgin Mary on her apparitions

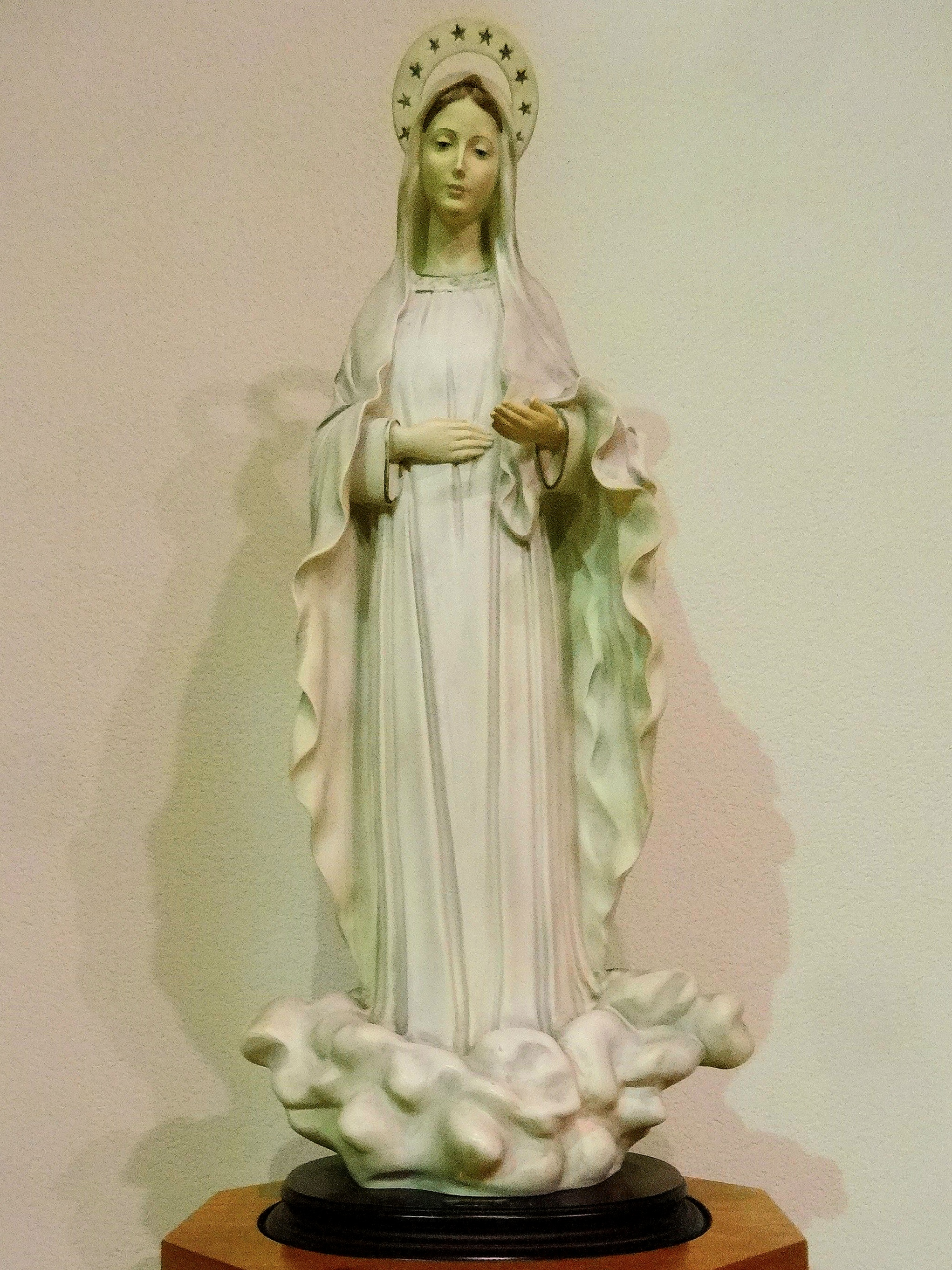
Statue representing the apparition of the Virgin Mary in Medjugorje

Vicka allegedly received messages from the Gospa from 19 December 1981 until 29 September 1982, and recorded them in her diary.

On 15 January 1982, the bishop invited the alleged seers to his residence to ask them if there they had received any messages from the Gospa on the issue, and they replied that they had not. However, on 3 April 1982, the seers came to the bishop to tell him that the Gospa scolded them for not telling the truth and that she requested that the two friars remain in Mostar and continue to celebrate mass and hear confessions. The Gospa allegedly told Vicka that Fr. Ivan Prusina and Fr. Ivica Vego "are not guilty of anything" in the matter. Tomislav Vlašić took responsibility for the lies of the seers telling the bishop he instructed them not to tell the truth because the bishop might dispute the authenticity of the apparitions.

On 21 June 1983, one of the seers, Ivan Dragičević, sent a threatening message allegedly from the Gospa to the bishop, in which she requested the bishop's conversion regarding her apparitions, otherwise, he would be "judged by me and my son Jesus." On 6 February 1985, Ivan Dragičević sent somewhat more tolerant message from the Gospa, with her stating that if he did not believe in her apparitions, at least he should not persecute her priests who believed in her messages and promoted them.

In the opinion of Peter Jan Margry's, the deviancy of such reported Marian apparitions is observed in their formal espousing of Catholic teachings, and obedience to the church and the Pope, while in practice, they consider the messages to be authentic revelations, have connections to excommunicated priests, and disobey the church and the Pope.

The Archbishop of Split-Makarska Frane Franić, who supported the alleged apparitions from the beginning, tried to persuade Vicka to retract the messages about the two friars, so the authenticity of the apparitions could be defended more easily. However, both Vicka and Ivan continued to claim that the messages regarding the two friars were from the Gospa. The messages included the accusations against Bishop Pavao Žanić and encouragement for the two friars not to leave the parish. It was then that Bishop Pavao took his final negative stance on the alleged apparitions.

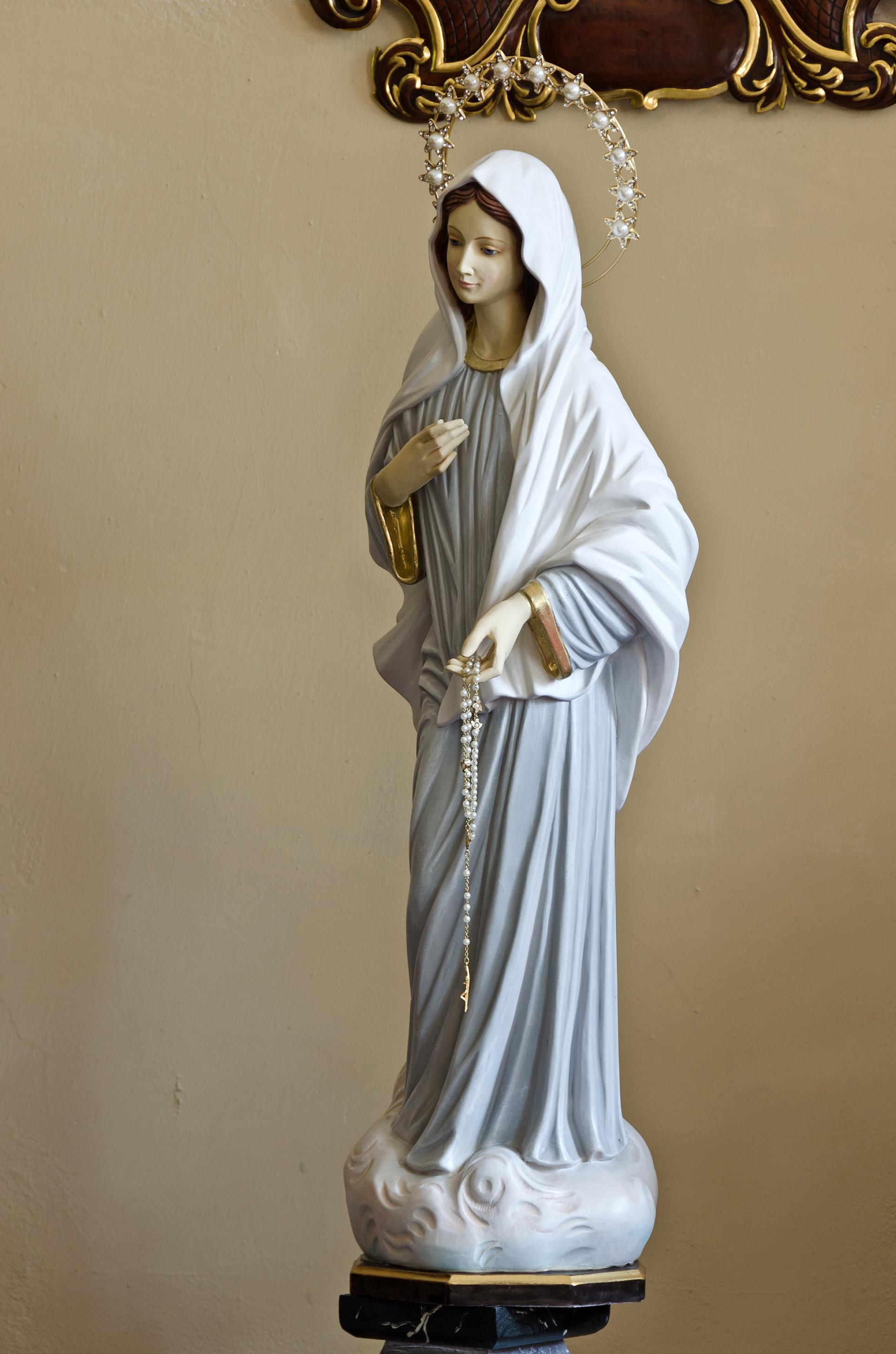
Commonly devoted statue of the Virgin of Medjugorje

The Bishop remained cautious towards the apparitions, without any final conclusion. He became skeptical towards the apparitions after the apparition accused him of the disorder in Herzegovina that existed between the Franciscans and the diocesan clergy and defended the two Franciscans who refused to leave their parishes as requested by the Papal decree Romanis Pontificibus.

Because of his disobedience, Fr. Ivan Prusina had his priestly jurisdiction revoked by Bishop Pavao Žanić on 9 October 1980. Fr. Ivan Prusina and Fr. Ivica Vego appealed to the Franciscan Order and the Congregation for Clergy, who declined their appeal considering the decisions to be final. However, the Apostolic Signatura, the highest judicial court of the Holy See, concluded on 27 March 1993 that they had a right on appeal and saw this as a violation of the procedure and declared the dismissal to be null and void; the same followed for Fr. Ivica Vego as well. The Franciscan Province of Herzegovina tried to present this as a sign of victory against the bishop, however, the bishop's revocation of Fr. Ivan Prusina's priestly jurisdiction remained in force, and the Apostolic Signature never reviewed the matter itself, only the procedural defects. It later became known that Fr. Ivica Vego had impregnated a nun, whom he eventually married; the two now live near Medjugorje.

== Government response ==
In 1982, the communist authorities changed their stance towards the Medjugorje phenomenon and no longer observed the event as political, but as an economic benefit. In the winter of 1983, the authorities started to promote religious tourism. In 1983 the state-owned publishing house, A. G. Matos published the book The Madonna's apparitions in Medjugorje (Croatian: Gospina ukazanja u Međugorju) by Ljudevit Rupčić, who was a theologian and Herzegovinian Franciscan loyal to Medjugorje. The state-owned tourist agencies also started offering their services to the Medjugorje pilgrims in 1984. The Yugoslav state-owned aviation company, Jat Airways, introduced special lines for the pilgrims from Italy. From the mid-1980s, the Yugoslav media also became supportive of the Medjugorje phenomenon, emphasizing its economic aspects.

== Catholic Church response ==
After considering the significant number of people who go to Medjugorje and the abundant "fruits of grace" that have sprung from it, Pope Francis lifted the ban on officially organized pilgrimages in May 2019. This was not to be interpreted as an authentication of known events, which still require examination, according to the Catholic Church.

On September 19, 2024, the Vatican granted "the spiritual event" of Medjugorje a "Nihil Obstat", which means Catholics "are authorized to give it their adherence in a prudent manner", encouraging pilgrimages to Medjugorje without entering into the question of alleged apparitions. The Holy See also said believers should not to go to Medjugorje for "alleged visionaries" but for the Queen of Peace.

== Skepticism ==
Two former bishops of the Diocese of Mostar-Duvno, Pavao Žanić and Ratko Perić, have stated that they believe that the apparitions are a hoax. Antonio Gaspari wrote that in the beginning, Zanic was supportive to the young seers, but subsequently changed his mind and became "the main critic and opponent of the Medjugorje apparitions."

Marian expert Donal Foley says that, “sadly, the only rational conclusion about Medjugorje is that it has turned out to be a vast, if captivating, religious illusion”. Foley attributed the popularity of the Medjugorje cult to the fact that Medjugorje may appeal to Catholics confused by changes after the Second Vatican Council.

Critics such as Catholic author E. Michael Jones consider the apparitions to be a hoax, and have stated that the reports of mysterious lights on the hill could easily be explained by illusions produced by atmospheric conditions, or fires that were lit by local youths. According to Chris Maunder in his book Our Lady of the Nations, the author E. Michael Jones is antagonistic towards Medjugorje, is not objective, and "presents a conspiracy theory rather than a thorough analysis."

Raymond Eve, a professor of sociology, in the Skeptical Inquirer has written:

I acknowledge that the teenagers' initial encounters with the Virgin may well have been caused by personal factors. For example, Ivanka, who was the first to perceive a visitation, had just lost her natural mother. The perception of apparitional experiences spread rapidly among her intimate peer group. ...The region's tension and anxiety likely exacerbated this contagion process and the need to believe among the youthful protagonists.

Skeptical investigator Joe Nickell has noted that there are a number of reasons for doubting the authenticity of the apparitions such as contradictions in the stories. For example, on the first sighting, the teenagers claimed they had visited Podbrdo Hill to smoke. They later retracted this, claiming they had gone to the hill to pick flowers. According to Nickell there is also a problem of the "embarrassingly illiterate" nature of the messages.

== Biographies of the assumed seers ==
=== Ivanka Ivanković ===
Ivanka Ivanković was born in Bijakovići in 1966. At the time of the alleged apparitions, she was 14. Her mother had died in May of that year. She was the first to see the apparition. She, like Ivan Dragičević and Vicka Dragičević, claims that Gospa told her biography between January and May 1983. She claims to have had regular apparitions until May 7, 1985, and that since then the apparitions occur once a year on the anniversary of her first apparition, June 24, 1981. She claims all ten secrets were given to her by Gospa.

She is married to Rajko Elez with whom she has three children. Rajko Elez is one of six sons who owns a local restaurant. They live in Međjugorje.

=== Mirjana Dragičević Soldo ===
Mirjana Dragičević Soldo was born in 1965, in Sarajevo. She was 15 at the time of the alleged apparitions. She lived in Sarajevo for some time, where she finished her education. She was the second person to see the Gospa. She claims she had regular apparitions between 24 June 1981, and 25 December 1982. She said that she became depressed when the visions stopped and prayed to see the Gospa again. According to Kutleša, Soldo was given all ten secrets, which are intended "for humanity in general, for the world, then for Međugorje, for Yugoslavia, and some other areas and about the sign". Mirjana said that the Gospa left her a gift that she will see the Gospa on her birthday. According the book Ogledalo Pravde, Soldo said that as of 2 August 1987, "every second day of the month I hear our Lady's voice in me, and sometimes I see her, and with her I pray for the unbelievers". As of 2 January 1997, Soldo knew at what time the Gospa would come - 10 to 11am.

She claims that the apparition told her ten secrets, which are intended "for humanity in general, for the world, then for Međugorje, Yugoslavia, and some other areas". Soldo also said that every seer has a special mission. She was given those who do not know the love of God, Vicka Ivanković and Jakov Čolo for the sick, Ivan Dragičević for the young and the priests, Marija Pavlović for the souls in purgatory, and Ivanka Ivanković for families.

Soldo has been married to Marko Soldo, the nephew of the late Franciscan Father Slavko Barbarić, since 1989 and they have two children. They live in Međugorje, where they own a hotel. They also own a mansion at the Croatian island of Hvar in Sućuraj. One of her daughters, Veronika, studied at the University of Mostar.

Soldo wrote her autobiography titled Moje srce će pobijediti (“My Heart will Triumph”).

On March 18, 2020, Mirjana Dragićević announced that the Blessed Mother would no longer appear to her at that time, the second of each month.

=== Marija Pavlović Lunetti ===
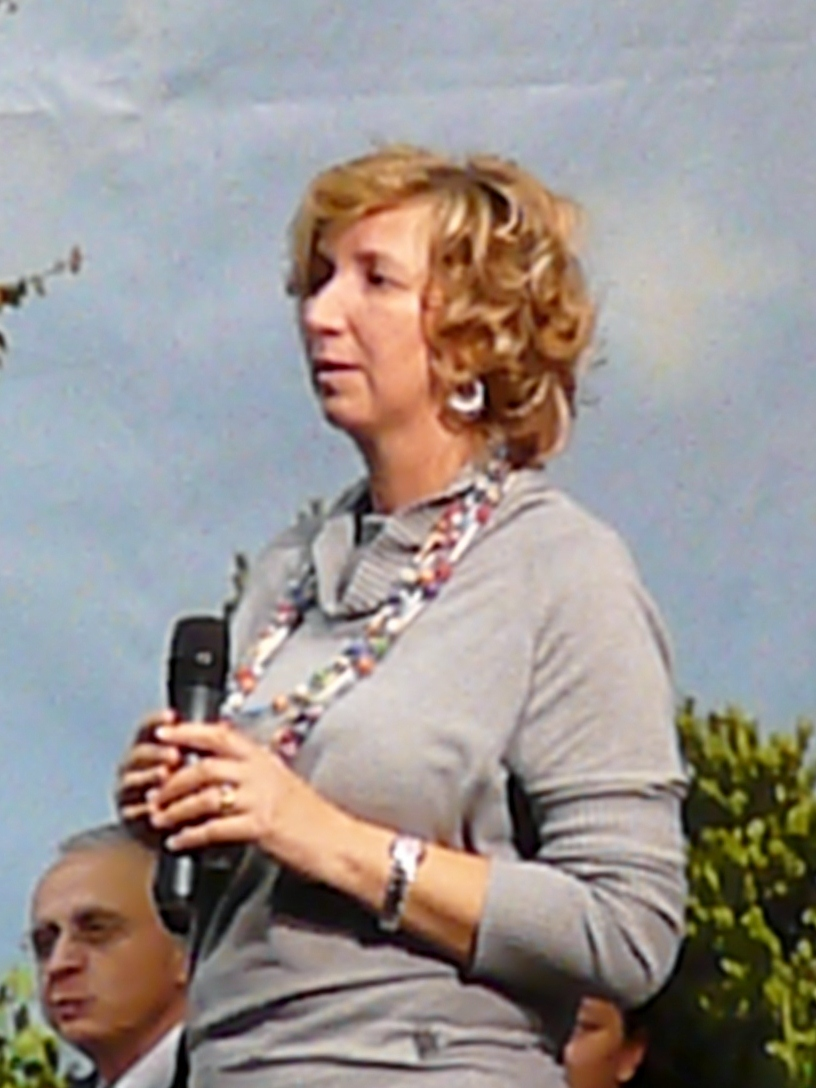
Marija Pavlović Lunetti

Marija Pavlović Lunetti was born on 1965, in Bijakovići near Međugorje. She finished secondary school in Mostar. To save her brother's life, she donated one of her kidneys. She was 16 at the time of the alleged apparitions of Our Lady, whom she first saw on June 25, 1981. She says she receives daily apparitions, was given nine secrets from the Gospa and receives a message on the 25th of each month for the entire world. These messages were first made public by the Franciscans overseeing the visionaries, Tomislav Vlašić, then after him Slavko Barbarić. She was given the mission to pray for the souls in purgatory.

She is married to Italian Paolo Lunetti with whom she has four children. Even though she lives most of the year in Milan, Italy, she visits Medjugorje often. When asked by an Italian journalist why she did not become a nun, she replied that even though she felt drawn to the monastery, she realized that her vocation is about witnessing what she saw and felt. She said that she will be able to seek the way of holiness outside the monastery.

Later, in February 1988, she joined fra Tomislav Vlašić, a New evangelization promoter, and his group of 15 young men and women in the community "Queen of Peace, – totally yours – Through Mary to Jesus" in Parma, Italy. Rene Laurentin wrote that her joining Vlašić's group was "enthusiastic". Together they participated in spiritual exercises for five months which were completely focused on prayer. Vlašić was an ex-friar since 1987, who with his German assistant, Agnes Heupel, founded a mystic community. Heupel claimed to receive messages from Gospa. Vlašić claimed that through Lunetti's testimony the community was a work of Gospa herself, and that Lunetti had delivered an answer, in March 1987, to his question to Gospa about the community. Vlašić claimed that Lunetti stated: "This is God's plan" and that "Gospa leads the group through father Tomislav and Agnes, through which she sends her messages for the community".

Her friends and family in Medjugorje were alarmed over her compliance, worried about Vlasic's ambitions. They helped her extricate from the group. She left in July 1988 and denied in writing ever receiving any messages regarding the community from the Gospa. According to Randall Sullivan, in Lunetti's open letter, written after she left the group in July 1988, she stated that Vlašić's claim "absolutely does not correspond to the truth."

Pavlović Lunetti was also a subject to a major embarrassment when she openly publicly endorsed Maria Valtorta's book The Poem of the Man-God. Valltorta's book contains alleged supernatural revelations, designated by the Church authorities as "fraudulent or stemming from a diseased mind". Pavlović Lunetti said that Madonna told her regarding the book that it "can be read... it makes for good reading". Her statements scandalised Catholic theologians.

=== Vicka Ivanković Mijatović ===
Vicka Ivanković Mijatović is the oldest of the alleged seers, born in 1964, in Bijakovići, a village near Međugorje. She was 16 at the time of the alleged apparitions. She said she had daily apparitions, and on occasions two, three, four or five times a day. Vicka said that the Gospa dictated to her the details of her life on earth from January 1983 to April 1985. It filled up three notebooks. She said she prayed and talked with Our Lady and was given nine secrets. Her prayer mission, given by the Blessed Virgin Mary, is to pray for the sick. Vicka says that her daily apparitions have not yet stopped.

According to Nikola Bulat, who examined Vicka's diaries for the commission, Tomislav Vlašić was the first spiritual guide of the seers and the chronicler of the apparitions. This chronicle covers the period from 11 August 1981 to 15 October 1983. Vicka said that some of her diaries were written by her sister and some she wrote.

She married Marijo Mijatović in 2002 and they have two children. The Mijatovićs live in a wall enclosed villa in Krehin Gradac near Medjugorje.

=== Ivan Dragičević ===
Ivan Dragičević was born in Mostar in 1965. He was 15 at the time of the alleged apparitions. After graduating from elementary school, he enrolled at a secondary school in Čitluk, but failed to pass. In August 1981 he applied to the seminary of the Herzegovinian Franciscan Province, where he was already known for the alleged apparitions so he was sent to a seminary in Visoko. In the seminary, he also claimed to have daily apparitions.

While in the Franciscan seminary, he claimed that Gospa came to an image of Jesus and said: "Angel, this is your father". It was written in Ogledalo pravde that such doctrine is nowhere to be found, in the Bible or in Church tradition. Dragičević claimed, like Vicka Dragičević, that the Gospa imparted her biography to him from December 1982 to May 1983. The seers claimed that the Gospa presented Ivan Dragičević to them and conveyed his greetings on 12 November 1981. When Ivan Dragičević appeared to other seers, they saw him "spreading his arms to fly out of joy" and the Madonna told him that she will not appear to him as of 15 November, due to school obligations. He appeared to Vicka and Jakov three days later as well. Again he failed to pass and was sent to the gymnasium in Dubrovnik, where it was thought he would pass the class more easily. He was unsuccessful there as well and left the school altogether in January 1983.

Dragičević married Laureen Murphy, a former Miss Massachusetts, in 1994. They have four children and live in Boston for six months and then reside for the other half of the year in the parish of Medjugorje. His wife owns a tourist agency for pilgrims to Medjugorje. Dragičević owns a hotel in Medjugorje and a property worth over one million american dollars.

In October 2013, Archbishop Gerhard Müller of the Congregation for the Doctrine of the Faith (CDF) wished the U.S. bishops to be aware that Dragicevic was scheduled to give presentations at parishes across the country and was anticipated to have more apparitions during these talks. According to the Catholic Stand, the Apostolic Nunciature to the United States advised the bishops that the 1991 Zadar declaration that Catholics, whether clergy or laypeople, "are not permitted to participate in meetings, conferences or public celebrations during which the credibility of such 'apparitions' would be taken for granted". The letter was sent to every diocese in the U.S. as the CDF determined that the judgment of the Yugoslavian bishops which precluded such gatherings remained in force.

=== Jakov Čolo ===
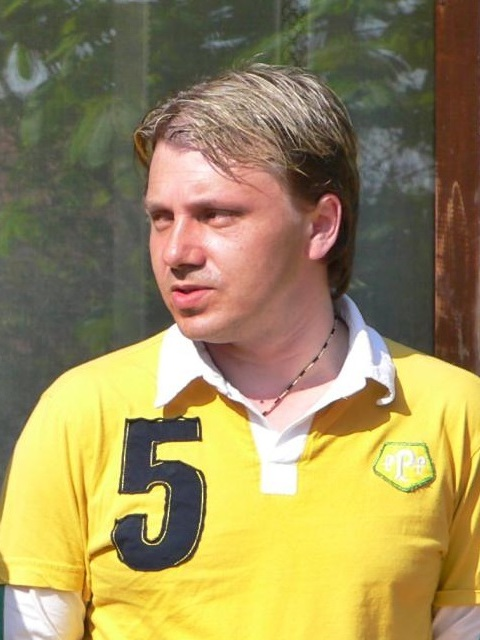
Jakov Čolo

Jakov Čolo was born in Bijakovići on March 6, 1971. His father abandoned the family when he was eight years old and his mother died from alcoholism when he was twelve. He was 10 at the time of the alleged apparitions. He claimed to have had daily apparitions from June 25, 1981, to September 12, 1998. As of then, he said that he has one apparition a year on Christmas Day and that the Gospa told him the tenth secret.

He married Annalisa Barozzi, an Italian, in 1993. They have three children and live in Međjugorje.

=== Other alleged seers ===
==== Jozo Zovko ====
Jozo Zovko, the former parish priest of Medjugorje, who was there from the beginning of the visions, was skeptical at first but in time he became the seers pre-eminent advocate and protector. He allegedly had a vision of Our Lady in a church on 11 April 1983.

Jakov Čolo and Vicka Ivanković claim to have seen an apparition of Zovko on 19 October 1981, while he was on trial at the time. While they prayed, they saw Zovko, who was smiling with the Madonna. Rene Laurentin wrote that Zovko "tells them not to be afraid for him, that everything was well."

The Madonna is said to have appeared to Jakov and Vicka on 21 October 1981. Rene Laurentin wrote that she told them not to worry about Zovko and said that "Jozo looks well and he greets you warmly. Do not fear for Jozo. He is a saint. I have already told you." Rene Laurentin wrote that the apparition told them that the "sentence will not be pronounced this evening. Do not be afraid, he will not be condemned to a severe punishment..." In Vlašić's chronicle, it was written that the apparition told them that the trial will be continued, however, the trial was over that very day, and the sentence was published the day after. Zovko's sentence was reduced to 3 1/2 years in prison. In February 1983 the communists released Zovko after 18 months of hard labor.

==== Jelena Vasilj and Marijana Vasilj ====
Jelena Vasilj, a young girl from Medjugorje with just ten years old in December of 1982, allegedly began to hear Our Lady's voice and see her in an interior way, or as seeing the Blessed Mother "with the eyes of the heart". These experiences are commonly called interior locutions. Several months later in March of 1983, Jelena's friend Marijana Vasilj (the two are friends but are not related) allegedly began to see Our Lady interiorly as well. Both girls hear Our Lady's voice and see her in two dimensions.

== Economic impact ==
According to Daniel McLaughlin of the Irish Times, although the Yugoslav authorities initially regarded the apparitions as little more than a conspiracy on the part of Croat extremists, gradually "the cash-strapped Yugoslav authorities realized the commercial potential of Medjugorje." Paolo Apolito writes that during the 1980s, Medjugorje was visited by a million pilgrimages on average. The number of visits continued after the end of Bosnian War in 1995.

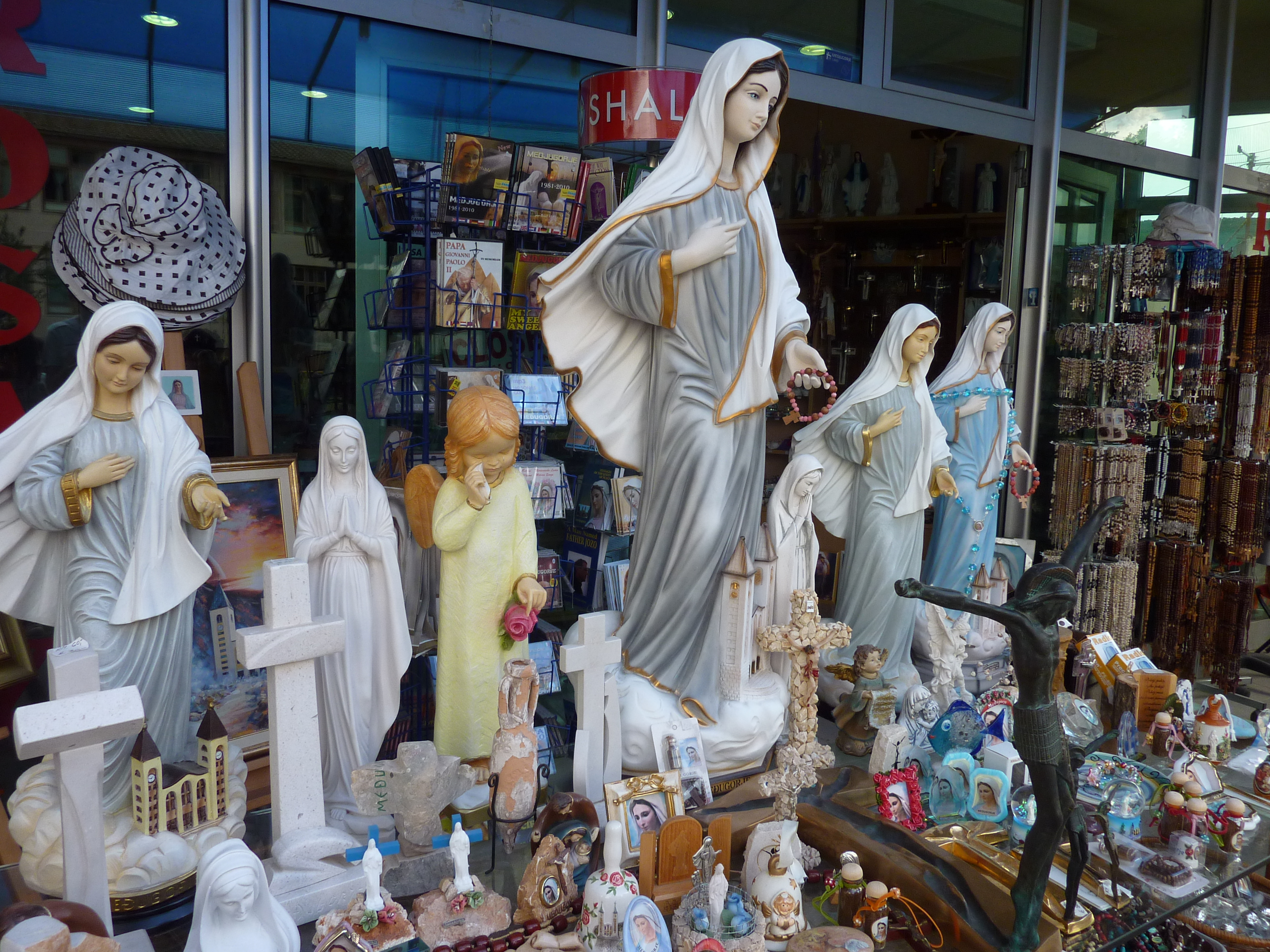
The aspect of religious commerce now quite common in the streets of Medjugorje village.

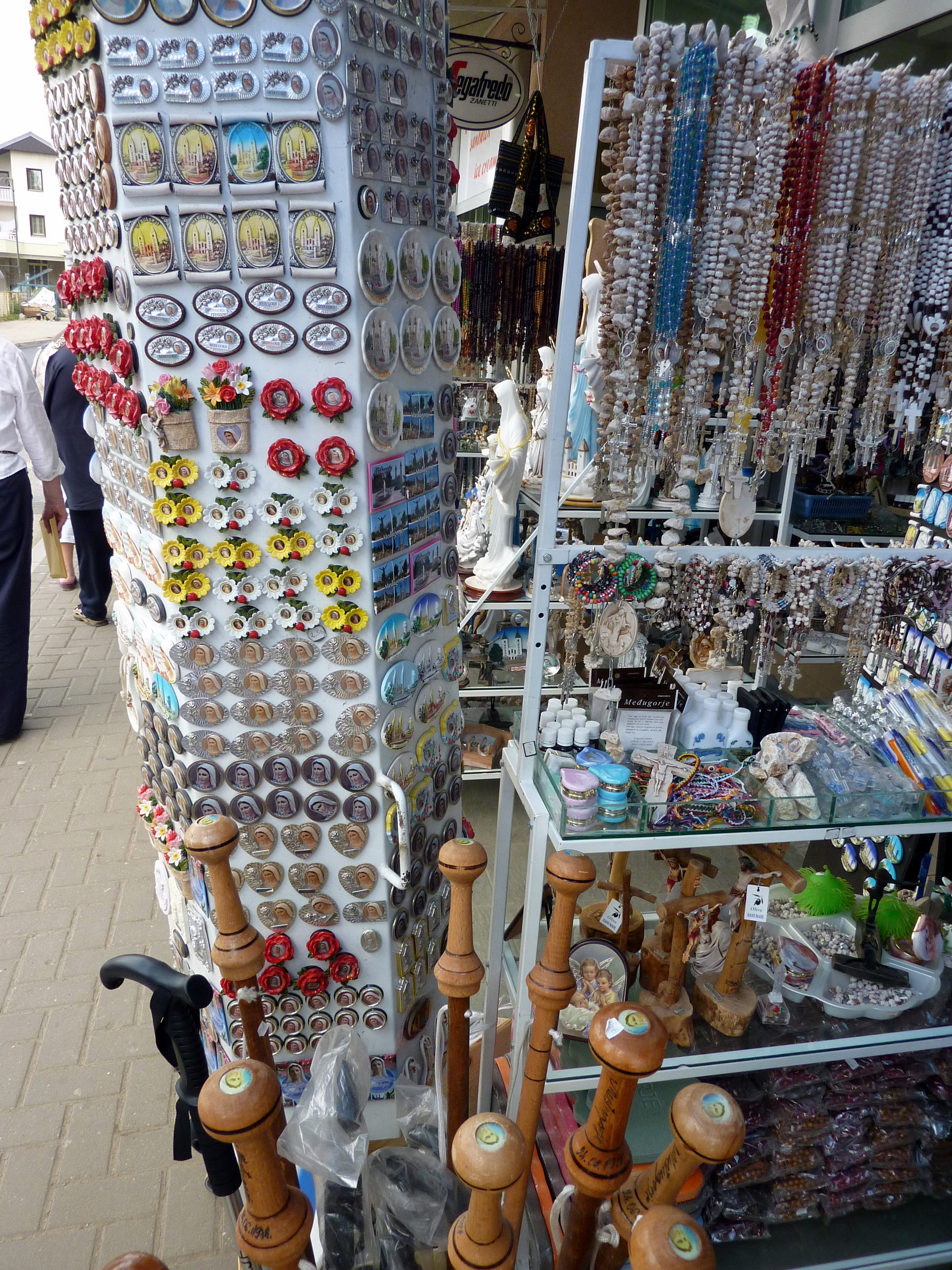
Rosaries and other religious items can be seen for sale in all streets of Medjugorje.

The popularity of the medjugorje apparitions turned the local community from a rural to a regional center. Journalist Inés San Martin described Medjugorje as "barely more than a village in 1981, and has since grown to become one big hotel, with restaurants and religious shops being the only commercial activity at hand." San Martin continues, "the holy industry of Medjugorje is in no way unique. From Rome’s St. Peter’s Square to Lourdes, vendors of endless religious articles, from an image of the Virgin to bobbing pope heads are always part of the scenery at any major Catholic venue."

Some profits were illegally used to fund the Croat military. One example is a businessman from the United Kingdom who used the money he apparently collected funds for the war orphans, but the money was channeled to the Croat military.

According to the Guardian, in 1997, the Hercegovačka Banka was founded "by several private companies and the Franciscan order, which controls the religious shrine in Medjugorje, a major source of income, both from pilgrims and from donations by Croats living abroad." Located in Mostar, the bank has branches in several towns. In 2001, the bank was investigated for possible ties to Bosnian Croat separatists attempting to forge an independent mini-state in Croat areas of Bosnia. Fra Tomislav Pervan and Fra Ivan Ševan were members of the supervisory board of the bank, along with three former officers of the Croatian Defence Council. According to the Guardian, on April 6, 2001 "masked police, backed by soldiers from the Nato-led Stabilisation Force (S-For), seized control of this bank" and the locals reacted. In the Guardian it was written that "in Mostar the bank's spokesman, Milan Sutalo, called the action 'absolutely illegal because this is a private bank and not a public institution. There was no reason for armed people coming to the bank'." According to Vecernji list BiH, although practically nothing significant was found that could be considered a megacrime according to what foreign-owned banks promoted decades later, the bank was destroyed, as well as a number of its companies, and the money of hundreds of companies and savers was blocked.

In 2016 an Italian was convicted of belonging to a group that was extorting money from foreigners who were escorting pilgrims to the Medjugorje Shrine.

Henryk Hoser, the apostolic visitator in Medjugorje, stated in July 2018 that the mafia had penetrated the pilgrimage site, specifically the Neapolitan mafia – the Camorra. According to the Neapolitan newspaper Il Mattino in Naples, magistrates are investigating Camorra ties to a pilgrimage business, three hotels, guide services, and souvenir vendors in Medjugorje.

=== Effects of the coronavirus to the town of Medjugorje ===
On March 20, 2020, the Associated Press presented a video of the empty streets in Medjugorje, writing that the locals now "fear international and Europe wide travel restrictions and anxiety about the coronavirus pandemic will lead to a dramatic fall in visitors and damage their livelihoods."

On June 25, 2020, Reuters reported that the travel restrictions had caused a marked decrease in pilgrimages, down from over 100,000 per year, along with a loss in revenue for local businesses.

== Locations of alleged visions outside of Medjugorje ==
Medjugorje is where the alleged visions began in 1981, and are claimed to be still occurring. Some visionaries, when traveling or moved, reported having visions in other locations. Here is a list of some of them:

- Bosnia and Herzegovina: Mostar, Sarajevo, Visoko (Ivan Dragičević in high school),
- Croatia: Zagreb, Varaždin, Dubrovnik Seminary (Ivan Dragičević),
- Slovenia: Ljubljana, Kurešček
- United States: Boston, Massachusetts, Birmingham, Alabama,
- Italy: Milan, Monza
- Switzerland

== Media ==
Radio Station "Mir" Međugorje started broadcasting on 25 November 1997.

Since January 2006, Informative centre MIR Međugorje publishes Croatian language monthly magazine Glasnik mira ("Peace messenger"), that brings news, stories and testimonies from Međugorje shrine.

== See also ==
- List of Marian apparitions
- Marian apparition
- Our Lady of Fátima
- Our Lady of Lourdes
- Visions of Jesus and Mary
- Norms regarding the manner of proceeding in the discernment of presumed apparitions or revelations
