= Dragicina =

Dragicina, Dragićina or Dragičina may refer to:

- Dragićina (Čitluk), a village in Čitluk, Bosnia and Herzegovina
- Dragičina (Grude), a village in Grude, Bosnia and Herzegovina
