= Blizanci, Čitluk =

Blizanci Близанци
- Village
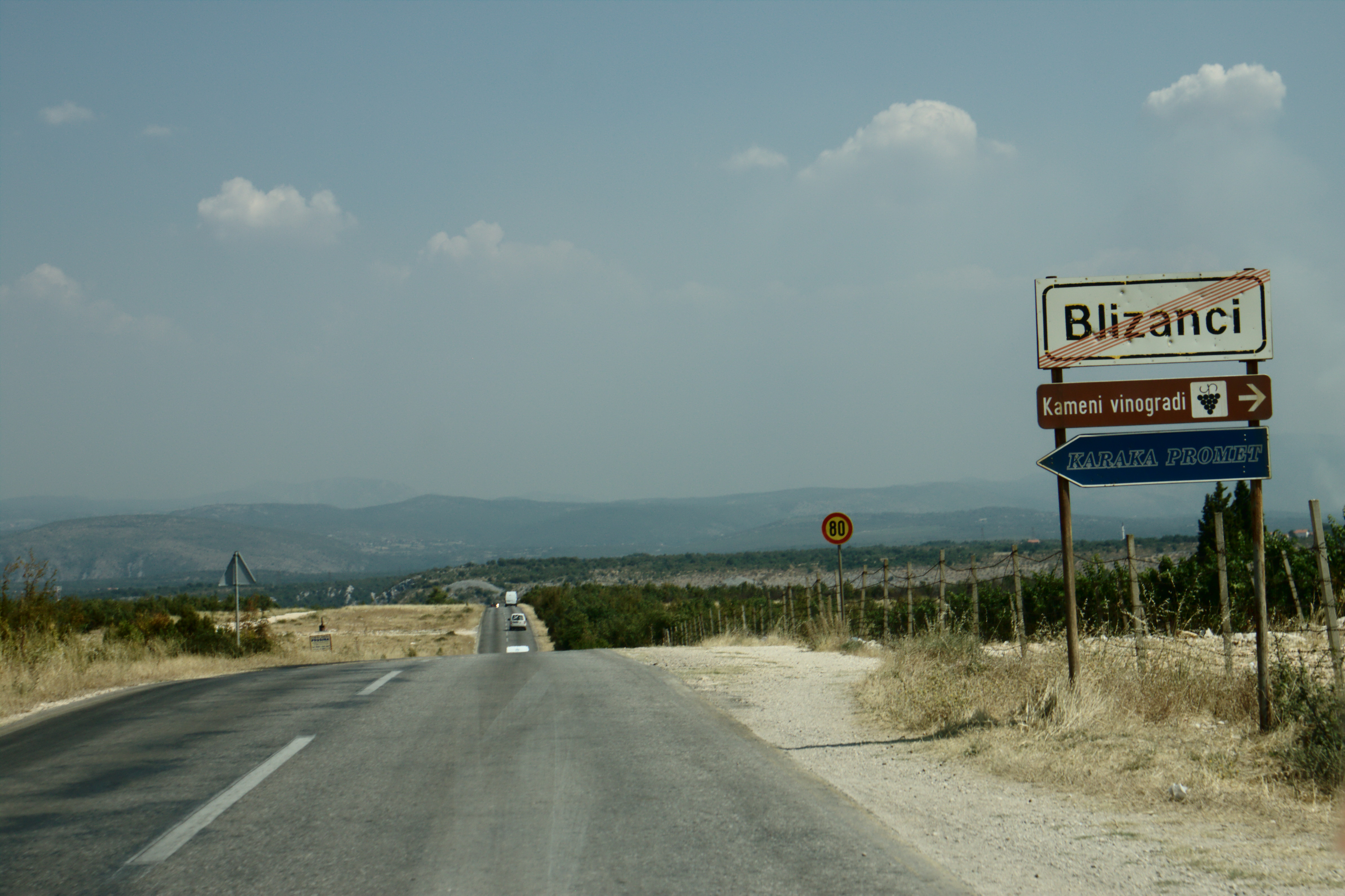

- Location within Bosnia and Herzegovina
- Country: Bosnia and Herzegovina
- Entity: Federation of Bosnia and Herzegovina
- Canton: Herzegovina-Neretva
- Municipality: Čitluk

Area
  - Total: 3.60 sq mi (9.33 km^{2})

Population (2013)
  - Total: 525
  - Density: 146/sq mi (56.3/km^{2})
- Time zone: UTC+1 (CET)
  - Summer (DST): UTC+2 (CEST)

Blizanci (Cyrillic: Близанци) is a village in the municipality of Čitluk, Bosnia and Herzegovina.

The village is known for its stony vineyards, consisting primarily of Žilavka grapes.

== Demographics ==
According to the 2013 census, its population was 525.

Ethnicity in 2013
| Ethnicity | Number | Percentage |
|---|---|---|
| Croats | 509 | 97.0% |
| Bosniaks | 15 | 2.9% |
| other/undeclared | 1 | 0.2% |
| Total | 525 | 100% |
