= St. James Church, Medjugorje =

Church in Medjugorje, Bosnia and Herzegovina

Parish Church of Saint James
- Crkva svetog Jakova
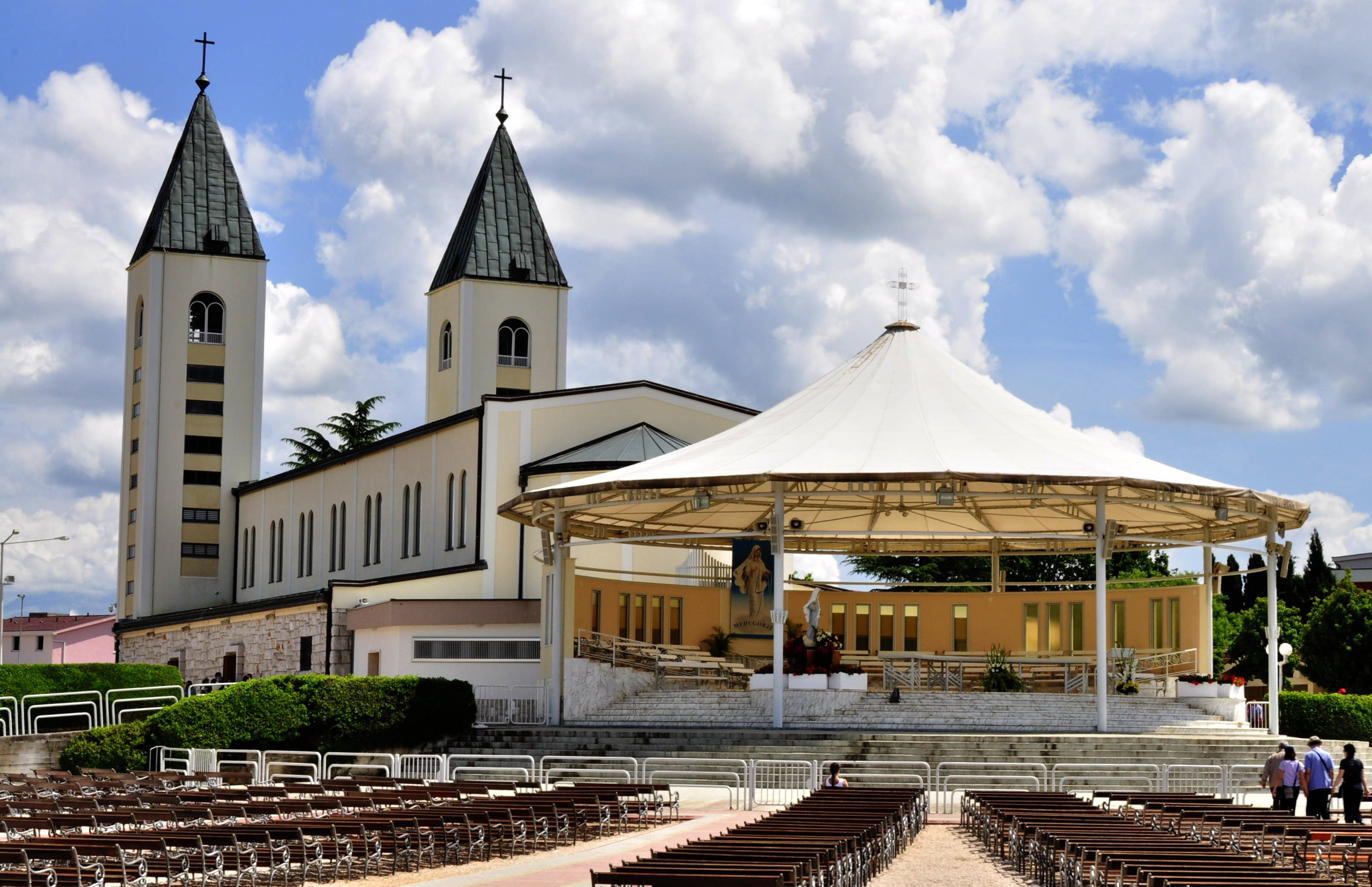
- Photo of the rear of the church with the outer alter for pilgrim events

- Location within Bosnia and Herzegovina
- 43°11′26″N 17°40′39″E
- Location: Medjugorje
- Country: Bosnia and Herzegovina
- Denomination: Catholic
- Tradition: James the Great
- Religious institute: Franciscan
- Website: https://www.medjugorje.ws

History
- Status: Parish church
- Consecrated: 19 January 1969

Architecture
- Heritage designation: National Monument of Bosnia and Herzegovina
- Architect: Stjepan Podhorsky

Clergy
- Bishop: Petar Palić

The Saint James Church is a Catholic parish church located in the village of Medjugorje, Bosnia and Herzegovina. The church was consecrated in 1969 and is a national monument of Bosnia and Herzegovina. The church is under the patronage of James the Great and is run by the Franciscan order of Bosnia. It is on the provisional list of National Monuments in Bosnia and Herzegovina The church and the village are also the site of numerous and ongoing Marian apparitions since 1981, which the Vatican's Office for Doctrine (CDF) declared favorably as "nihil obstat" (meaning, nothing stands in the way) in September 2024 under newly written norms.

Since the alleged Marian apparition of the Our Lady of Medjugorje in 1981, over 50,000,000 pilgrims have visited the parish.

== History ==
The original church's construction was completed in 1897, 5 years after the founding of the parish by Bishop Paškal Buconjić. The building was considered luxurious for the time, but was built on unstable foundations and cracks began to appear. Following the end of World War I, the parishioners formed a project to build a new church.

The creation of the new church was realized by Zagrebian architect Stjepa Podhorsky. Construction began in 1934 and was completed on 19 January 1969, the day of its consecration. Work continued on the church even after the consecration, as the interior was not decorated and the bell towers were not built. All finalizing decorations were completed by 1980.

In 2021, Pope Francis sent a message that was read aloud to 50,000 pilgrims during a visit by Cardinal Robert Sarah. In 2022, a replica of the church was built in Talisay City, Philippines.

On July 28, 2026, vandals descerated two statues in the complex and lit an altar on fire. They wrote in graffiti on the statues saying "devil in a skirt" and "evil", and painted parts of various statues' with black paint. Other vandalism was found nearby, with writing in Polish stating "they are fraudsters, I have proof."

== Architecture ==
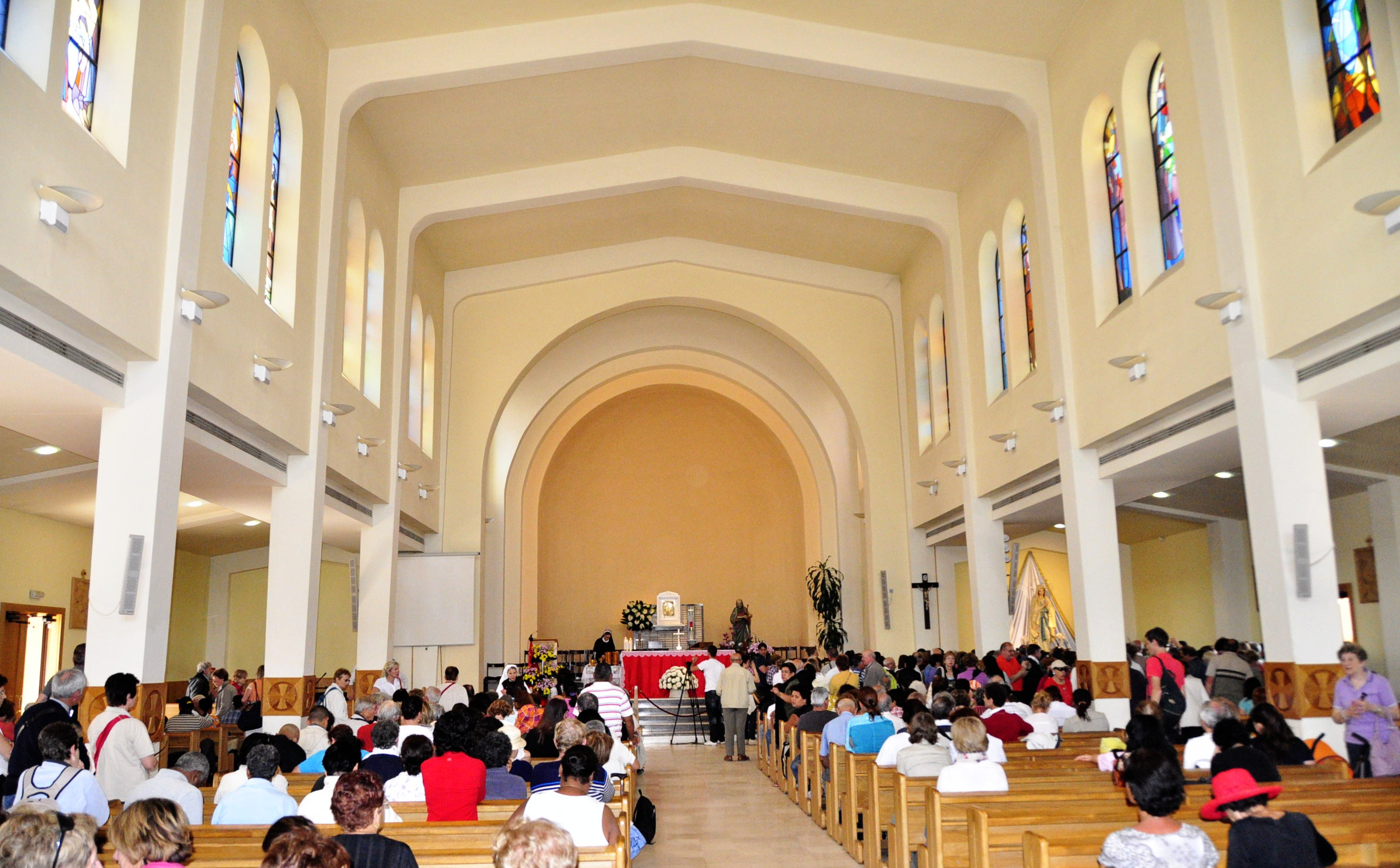
Interior of the church

The church, built in classical basilical style, has two towers connected to the center on both sides, having square bases and tented roofs. Between the towers there is a three-door entrance to the nave. In the tympanum above the central entrance, a relief depicts Saint James the Great, the church's patron saint.

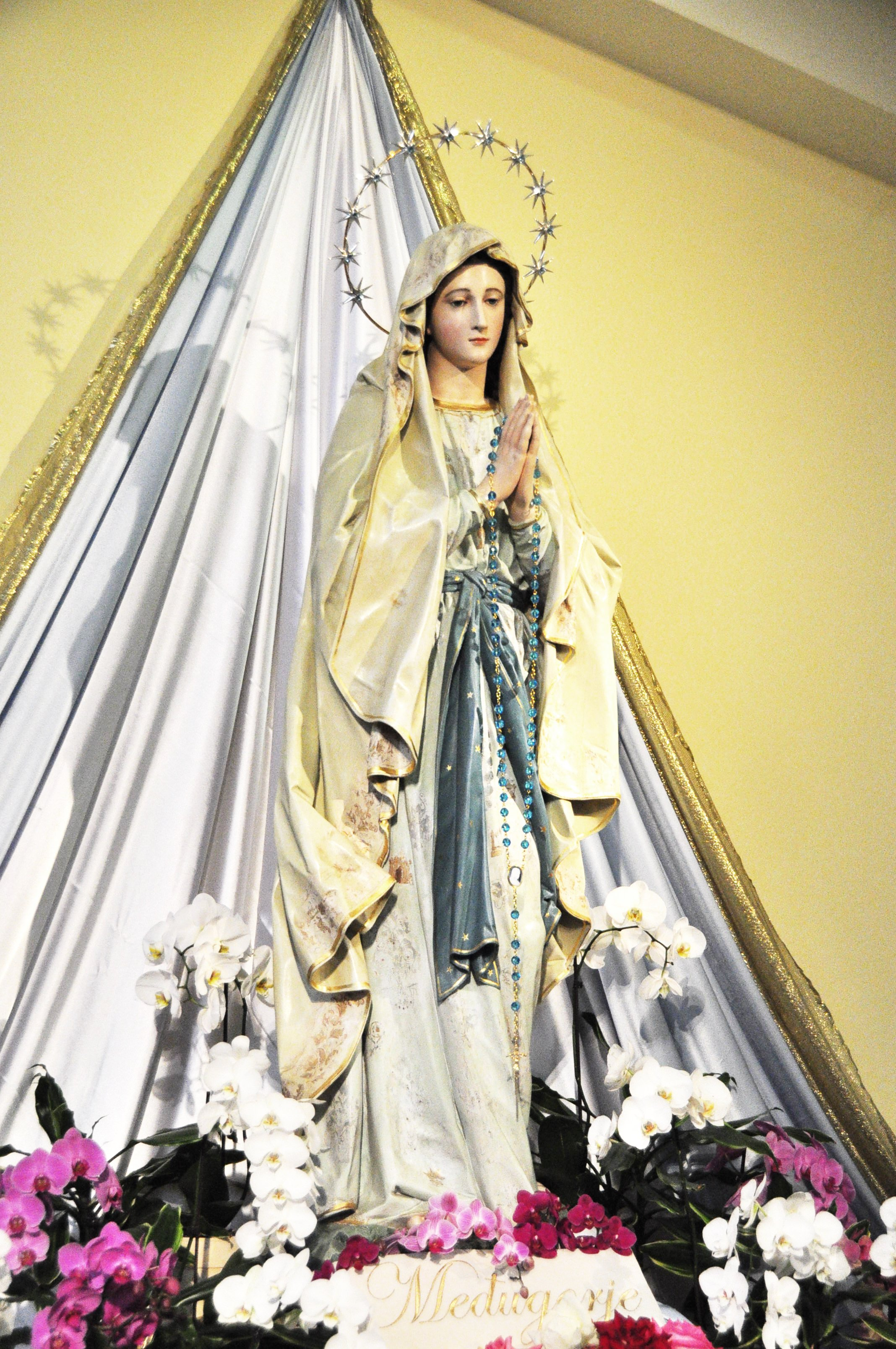
Statue of the Virgin Mary in the church

The large and increasing volume of pilgrims to the parish and its surroundings have been the cause of many renovations and additions to the ground of the church since 1981. In 1989, an outer alter and a surrounding prayer area with around 5,000 seats serve as a gathering place for liturgical celebrations during the summer months, the most popular season for pilgrims to visit. A fenced park to the east of the sanctuary commemorates the site of the Pre-WWI parish church.
