= Mali Ograđenik =

- Village
- Location within Bosnia and Herzegovina
- Coordinates: 43°14′N 17°37′E
- Country: Bosnia and Herzegovina
- Entity: Federation of Bosnia and Herzegovina
- Canton: Herzegovina-Neretva
- Municipality: Čitluk

Area
  - Total: 3.37 sq mi (8.72 km^{2})

Population (2013)
  - Total: 473
  - Density: 140/sq mi (54.2/km^{2})
- Time zone: UTC+1 (CET)
  - Summer (DST): UTC+2 (CEST)

Mali Ograđenik is a village in the municipality of Čitluk, Bosnia and Herzegovina.

== Demographics ==
According to the 2013 census, its population was 473.

Ethnicity in 2013
Ethnicity	Number	Percentage
Croats	471	99.6%
Bosniaks	1	0.2%
other/undeclared	1	0.2%
Total	473	100%
