= Čerin =

- Village
- Location within Bosnia and Herzegovina
- Coordinates: 43°12′N 17°42′E
- Country: Bosnia and Herzegovina
- Entity: Federation of Bosnia and Herzegovina
- Canton: Herzegovina-Neretva
- Municipality: Čitluk

Area
  - Total: 0.69 sq mi (1.80 km^{2})

Population (2013)
  - Total: 296
  - Density: 426/sq mi (164/km^{2})
- Time zone: UTC+1 (CET)
  - Summer (DST): UTC+2 (CEST)
- Area code: +387 36

Čerin is a village located in the Herzegovina region of Bosnia and Herzegovina. It is in the municipality of Čitluk in the Herzegovina-Neretva Canton of the Federation of Bosnia and Herzegovina.

== History ==
Čerin was first time mentioned on the July 16th 1397. in the files of Republic of Ragusa. The village has traditionally been the center of Upper Brotnjo (ex municipality). The village was home to the Church of St. Stephen, which was toppled by the Ottoman Empire in 1668 but now it is renewed. In 1938, HKD Napredak opened a branch office in Čerin. Local elementary school was opened in 1905.

== Demographics ==
In 1991, the village had a population of 266, composed of 265 Croats (99,6%) and 1 others (0,4%). In the 2013. census Čerin had a population of 296, Croats 293 and 3 unknown.
