= Žilavka =

Variety of grape

- Grape (Vitis)
- Color of berry skin: Blanc
- Species: Vitis vinifera
- Also called: See list of synonyms
- Origin: Bosnia and Herzegovina
- Notable regions: Herzegovina
- VIVC number: 13446

Žilavka is a white wine grape variety planted primarily in the Mostar region of Herzegovina, the southern area of Bosnia and Herzegovina. As a varietal wine, Žilavka is known for its bright freshness and acidity. Ideal for general meal pairings, it is often oak aged as a "barrique" vintage that present more full bodied and earthy wines with nutty aspects that were more prevalent in the wines produced in the early 2000s and before.

Widely planted throughout the former Yugoslavia, Žilavka used to only be a minor blending grape that was used throughout the former country. These days, the wine has come into its own and is bottled as a single varietal alongside the other main grape of Herzegovina wine production, Blatina.

Production is generally focused in the area south of Mostar around the villages of Čitluk, Međugorje, Ljubuški, and Čapljina with notable producers such as Nuić, Škegro, Brkić, Vinarija Čitluk, Zadro and Vitai/Gangaš.

== Synonyms ==
Žilavka is also known under the synonyms Mostarska, Mostarska Žilavka, Zhelavka Biella, Žilava Hercegovačka, Zilavka, Žilavka Bijela, and Žilavka Mostarska.
