= Bijakovići =

Bijakovići Бијаковићи
- Village
- Location within Bosnia and Herzegovina
- Coordinates: 43°11′N 17°42′E
- Country: Bosnia and Herzegovina
- Entity: Federation of Bosnia and Herzegovina
- Canton: Herzegovina-Neretva
- Municipality: Čitluk

Area
  - Total: 2.90 sq mi (7.52 km^{2})

Population (2013)
  - Total: 1,438
  - Density: 495/sq mi (191/km^{2})
- Time zone: UTC+1 (CET)
  - Summer (DST): UTC+2 (CEST)

Bijakovići (Cyrillic: Бијаковићи) is a village in the municipality of Čitluk, Bosnia and Herzegovina.

The village is within the area served by the Franciscans friars of Medjugorje. In 1981, Mount Podbrdo in Bijakovići was the site of the alleged first Marian apparitions of the entity referred to as Gospa.

The Croatian-Canadian businessman and poet Anton Kikaš was born in Bijakovići in 1941 to Catholic Croatian parents as one of five children. The world-famous tennis players Marin Čilić and Ivan Dodig are also from his birthplace Bijakovići.

== Demographics ==
According to the 2013 census, its population was 1,438.

Ethnicity in 2013
Ethnicity	Number	Percentage
Croats	1,360	94.6%
Bosniaks	3	0.2%
other/undeclared	75	5.2%
Total	1,438	100%
