= Krućevići =

- Village
- Location within Bosnia and Herzegovina
- Coordinates: 43°10′18″N 17°46′25″E
- Country: Bosnia and Herzegovina
- Entity: Federation of Bosnia and Herzegovina
- Canton: Herzegovina-Neretva
- Municipality: Čitluk

Area
  - Total: 2.86 sq mi (7.41 km^{2})

Population (2013)
  - Total: 162
  - Density: 56.6/sq mi (21.9/km^{2})
- Time zone: UTC+1 (CET)
  - Summer (DST): UTC+2 (CEST)

Krućevići is a village in the municipality of Čitluk, Bosnia and Herzegovina.

== Demographics ==
According to the 2013 census, its population was 162, all Croats.
