= Gradnići =

- Village
- Location within Bosnia and Herzegovina
- Coordinates: 43°14′N 17°44′E
- Country: Bosnia and Herzegovina
- Entity: Federation of Bosnia and Herzegovina
- Canton: Herzegovina-Neretva
- Municipality: Čitluk

Area
  - Total: 2.42 sq mi (6.28 km^{2})

Population (2013)
  - Total: 525
  - Density: 217/sq mi (83.6/km^{2})
- Time zone: UTC+1 (CET)
  - Summer (DST): UTC+2 (CEST)

Gradnići is a village in the municipality of Čitluk, Bosnia and Herzegovina.

== Demographics ==
According to the 2013 census, its population was 525.

Ethnicity in 2013
Ethnicity	Number	Percentage
Croats	524	99.8%
Bosniaks	1	0.2%
Total	525	100%
