= Dobro Selo, Čitluk =

Dobro Selo
- Village
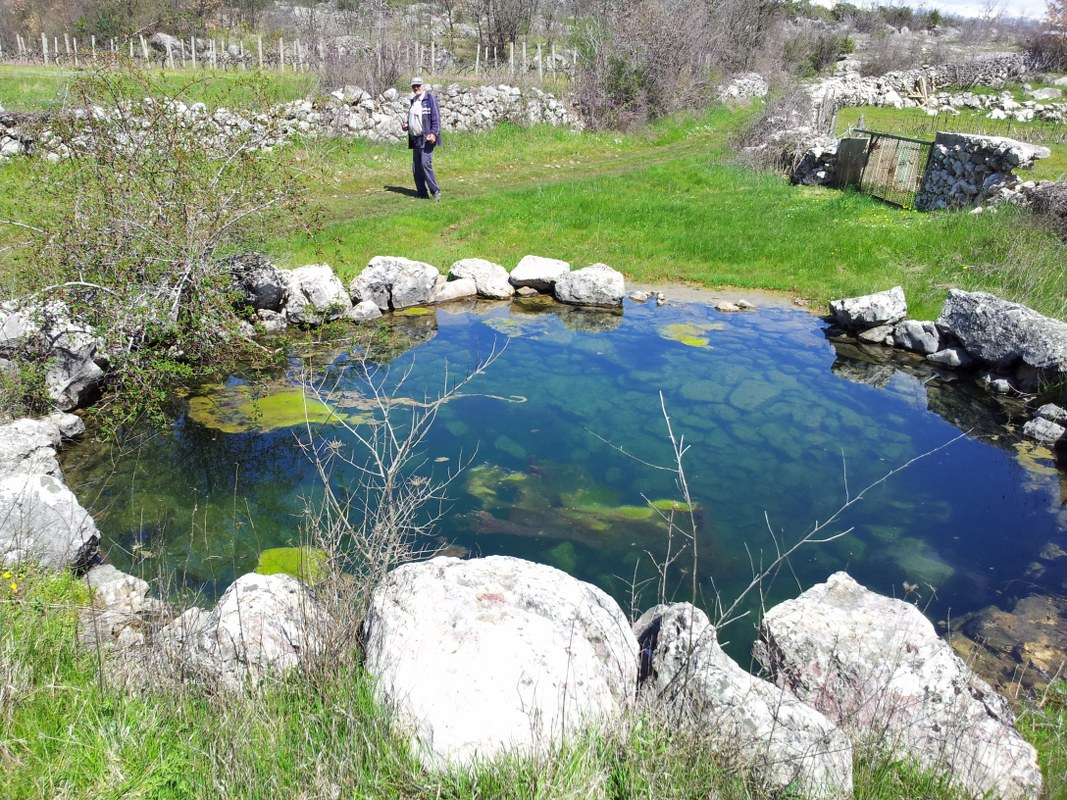
- Spring in Dobro Selo, Bosnia and Herzegovina

- Location within Bosnia and Herzegovina
- Country: Bosnia and Herzegovina
- Entity: Federation of Bosnia and Herzegovina
- Canton: Herzegovina-Neretva
- Municipality: Čitluk

Area
  - Total: 3.89 sq mi (10.07 km^{2})

Population (2013)
  - Total: 409
  - Density: 105/sq mi (40.6/km^{2})
- Time zone: UTC+1 (CET)
  - Summer (DST): UTC+2 (CEST)

Dobro Selo is a village in the municipality of Čitluk, Bosnia and Herzegovina.

== Demographics ==
According to the 2013 census, its population was 409.

Ethnicity in 2013
Ethnicity	Number	Percentage
Croats	405	99.0%
Serbs	2	0.5%
other/undeclared	2	0.5%
Total	409	100%
