= Mate Bulić =

Bosnian Croat singer (born 1957)

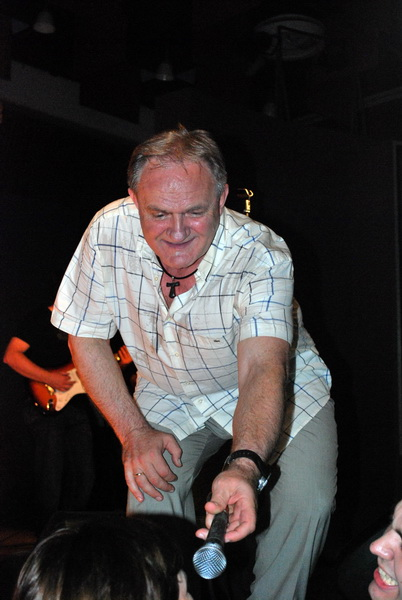
- Bulić in 2009
- Born: 18 February 1957 (age 68); Blatnica, PR Bosnia and Herzegovina, FPR Yugoslavia
- Occupation: Singer

Mate Bulić (born 18 February 1957) is a Bosnian Herzegovinian Croat pop and folk singer, whose songs are influenced by his native of Bosnia and Herzegovina. Since the 1990s, he has been living and performing from Frankfurt, Germany, where he became known as the "King of the Diaspora".

== Biography ==
Bulić finished his schooling in Čitluk and at Mostar, graduating in electrical engineering. However, he decided not to pursue a teaching job in Mostar and moved to Frankfurt where he married and started a family. It was not until later that he began to develop his music career. It was not until the early 1990s that he began recording, and in 1994 his first album was released. He is known for using numerous elements of traditional Croatian music which he incorporates into his music, such as the use of the lijerica and the singing of ganga. He has collaborated with many Croatian artists, most notably Miroslav Škoro and Marko Perković.

== Albums ==
1. Šuti Đurđa (1983)
2. Tražim ženu tebi sličnu (1984)
3. Gdje ste noćas prijatelji stari (1994)
4. Dodijalo pajdo (1997)
5. Hrvatske narodne pjesme (1998)
6. Pjevajte sa mnom (1999)
7. Sve najbolje (2001)
8. Gori borovina (2003)
9. Megamix (2004)
10. Kako mi je, tako mi je (2007)
11. Domu mom (2011)
12. Sretan Božić, moj narode (2017)
