= Tepčići =

Tepčići Тепчићи
- Village
- Location within Bosnia and Herzegovina
- Coordinates: 43°13′N 17°46′E
- Country: Bosnia and Herzegovina
- Entity: Federation of Bosnia and Herzegovina
- Canton: Herzegovina-Neretva
- Municipality: Čitluk

Area
  - Total: 2.90 sq mi (7.51 km^{2})

Population (2013)
  - Total: 219
  - Density: 75.5/sq mi (29.2/km^{2})
- Time zone: UTC+1 (CET)
  - Summer (DST): UTC+2 (CEST)

Tepčići (Cyrillic: Тепчићи) is a village in the municipality of Čitluk, Bosnia and Herzegovina.

== Demographics ==
According to the 2013 census, its population was 219, all Croats.
