= Služanj =

- Village
- Location within Bosnia and Herzegovina
- Country: Bosnia and Herzegovina
- Entity: Federation of Bosnia and Herzegovina
- Canton: Herzegovina-Neretva
- Municipality: Čitluk

Area
  - Total: 3.16 sq mi (8.18 km^{2})

Population (2013)
  - Total: 897
  - Density: 284/sq mi (110/km^{2})
- Time zone: UTC+1 (CET)
  - Summer (DST): UTC+2 (CEST)

Služanj is a village located in Herzegovina, in southern Bosnia and Herzegovina. It is a municipality of the Herzegovina-Neretva Canton in the Federation of Bosnia and Herzegovina. It is within Čitluk county.

The town is near Marian shrine of Međugorje which is located just to the south of the town of Čitluk.

== Demographics ==
=== 1991 ===
In 1991, the municipality had a population of few thousand people, of which there were 544 Croats (98.9%) and 17 Yugoslavs (1.1%).

=== 2013 ===
According to the 2013 census, its population was 897, all Croats.

== Sports ==
This is the birth town of popular Croatian footballer Zvonimir Soldo, who works in Cologne in Germany.
