= Biletići =

- Village

- Location within Bosnia and Herzegovina
- Country: Bosnia and Herzegovina
- Entity: Federation of Bosnia and Herzegovina
- Canton: Herzegovina-Neretva
- Municipality: Čitluk

Area
  - Total: 1.87 sq mi (4.85 km^{2})

Population (2013)
  - Total: 330
  - Density: 180/sq mi (68/km^{2})
- Time zone: UTC+1 (CET)
  - Summer (DST): UTC+2 (CEST)

Biletići is a village in the municipality of Čitluk, Bosnia and Herzegovina.

== Demographics ==
According to the 2013 census, its population was 330.

Ethnicity in 2013
Ethnicity	Number	Percentage
Croats	326	98.8%
Bosniaks	3	0.9%
Serbs	1	0.3%
other/undeclared	0	0.0%
Total	330	100%
