= Vionica, Bosnia and Herzegovina =

Vionica
- Village
- Location within Bosnia and Herzegovina
- Country: Bosnia and Herzegovina
- Entity: Federation of Bosnia and Herzegovina
- Canton: Herzegovina-Neretva
- Municipality: Čitluk

Area
  - Total: 2.50 sq mi (6.47 km^{2})

Population (2013)
  - Total: 704
  - Density: 282/sq mi (109/km^{2})
- Time zone: UTC+1 (CET)
  - Summer (DST): UTC+2 (CEST)

Vionica is a village in the municipality of Čitluk, Bosnia and Herzegovina.

== Demographics ==
According to the 2013 census, its population was 704.

Ethnicity in 2013
Ethnicity	Number	Percentage
Croats	667	94.7%
Other/undeclared	37	5.3%
Total	704	100%
