= Potpolje =

Potpolje Потпоље
- Village
- Location within Bosnia and Herzegovina
- Coordinates: 43°14′24″N 17°42′36″E
- Country: Bosnia and Herzegovina
- Entity: Federation of Bosnia and Herzegovina
- Canton: Herzegovina-Neretva
- Municipality: Čitluk

Area
  - Total: 1.27 sq mi (3.29 km^{2})

Population (2013)
  - Total: 965
  - Density: 760/sq mi (293/km^{2})
- Time zone: UTC+1 (CET)
  - Summer (DST): UTC+2 (CEST)

Potpolje (Cyrillic: Потпоље) is a village in the municipality of Čitluk, Bosnia and Herzegovina.In 1991, village had a population of 736

== Demographics ==
According to the 2013 census, its population was 965.

Ethnicity in 2013
Ethnicity	Number	Percentage
Croats	956	99.1%
Serbs	2	0.2%
other/undeclared	7	0.7%
Total	965	100%
