= Paoča =

- Village
- Location within Bosnia and Herzegovina
- Coordinates: 43°14′N 17°44′E
- Country: Bosnia and Herzegovina
- Entity: Federation of Bosnia and Herzegovina
- Canton: Herzegovina-Neretva
- Municipality: Čitluk

Area
  - Total: 2.67 sq mi (6.91 km^{2})

Population (2013)
  - Total: 427
  - Density: 160/sq mi (61.8/km^{2})
- Time zone: UTC+1 (CET)
  - Summer (DST): UTC+2 (CEST)

Paoča is a village in the municipality of Čitluk, Bosnia and Herzegovina.

== History ==
The name Paoča is of Slavic origin. This is shown by one stećak from the cemetery, which was probably placed at the end of the Middle Ages. In addition, on November 18, 1432, the people of Dubrovnik recorded that the men of Prince Marko Grgurević (Milatović) and the men of Duke Vukašin Milatović attacked the Dubrovnik caravan near Paoča (a Chotaoza).

Friar Petar Bakula in his book Schematismus from 1867 states: Paoča is named after the famous spring Paočak or Palačak. It is characterized by a large noble cemetery and the production of excellent wine.

== Demographics ==
According to the 2013 census, its population was 427, all Croats.

== Sights ==
In Paoča there is a small chapel dedicated to the Immaculate Conception of the Blessed Virgin Mary. It was finally completed in 1984 with the constant work and effort of the locals. Every year on the Immaculate Conception, December 8, the people of Paoča gather around the chapel where holy mass is celebrated. Next to the chapel there is also a monument to the fallen veterans from Paoča, built in 1996.

The people of Paoča are proud of their fellow resident Fr. Didak Buntić, to whom they built a monument in 1995, the work of Acad. sculptor Bernardo Pešorda. The monument was unveiled by the then Minister of Defense of the Republic of Croatia, Gojko Šušak.

In the village there is also an old noble cemetery, Krešića greblje. It is a medieval necropolis in which there are about fifteen stećaks. They are in the form of plates and boxes, and are divided into two groups. They are oriented west–east. They are decorated with rosettes. These tombs originate from the late Middle Ages.
