= Blatnica, Čitluk =

Blatnica Блатница
- Village
- Location within Bosnia and Herzegovina
- Coordinates: 43°14′50″N 17°40′58″E
- Country: Bosnia and Herzegovina
- Entity: Federation of Bosnia and Herzegovina
- Canton: Herzegovina-Neretva
- Municipality: Čitluk

Area
  - Total: 4.17 sq mi (10.80 km^{2})

Population (2013)
  - Total: 975
  - Density: 234/sq mi (90.3/km^{2})
- Time zone: UTC+1 (CET)
  - Summer (DST): UTC+2 (CEST)

Blatnica (Cyrillic: Блатница) is a village in the municipality of Čitluk, Bosnia and Herzegovina.

== Demographics ==
According to the 2013 census, its population was 975.

Ethnicity in 2013
Ethnicity	Number	Percentage
Croats	974	99.9%
other/undeclared	1	0.1%
Total	975	100%
