= Dragićina, Čitluk =

Dragićina Драгићина
- Village
- Location within Bosnia and Herzegovina
- Country: Bosnia and Herzegovina
- Entity: Federation of Bosnia and Herzegovina
- Canton: Herzegovina-Neretva
- Municipality: Čitluk

Area
  - Total: 3.16 sq mi (8.19 km^{2})

Population (2013)
  - Total: 532
  - Density: 168/sq mi (65.0/km^{2})
- Time zone: UTC+1 (CET)
  - Summer (DST): UTC+2 (CEST)

Dragićina (Cyrillic: Драгићина) is a village in the municipality of Čitluk, Bosnia and Herzegovina.

== Demographics ==
According to the 2013 census, its population was 532, all Croats.
