= Hamzići, Čitluk =

Hamzići
- Village
- Location within Bosnia and Herzegovina
- Country: Bosnia and Herzegovina
- Entity: Federation of Bosnia and Herzegovina
- Canton: Herzegovina-Neretva
- Municipality: Čitluk

Area
  - Total: 8.45 sq mi (21.89 km^{2})

Population (2013)
  - Total: 1,167
  - Density: 138.1/sq mi (53.31/km^{2})
- Time zone: UTC+1 (CET)
  - Summer (DST): UTC+2 (CEST)

Hamzići is a village in the municipality of Čitluk, Bosnia and Herzegovina.

== Demographics ==
According to the 2013 census, its population was 1,167.

Ethnicity in 2013
Ethnicity	Number	Percentage
Croats	1,166	99.9%
other/undeclared	1	0.1%
Total	1,167	100%
