= Blatina, Kolašin =

Blatina Блатина
- Village
- Location within Montenegro
- Coordinates: 42°51′16″N 19°28′58″E
- Country: Montenegro
- Region: Northern
- Municipality: Kolašin

Population (2011)
  - Total: 110
- Time zone: UTC+1 (CET)
  - Summer (DST): UTC+2 (CEST)

Blatina (Montenegrin Cyrillic: Блатина) is a village in the municipality of Kolašin, Montenegro.

== Demographics ==
According to the 2011 census, its population was 110.

Ethnicity in 2011
Ethnicity	Number	Percentage
Serbs	52	47.3%
Montenegrins	49	44.5%
other/undeclared	9	8.2%
Total	110	100%
