= Krehin Gradac =

Krehin Gradac Крехин Градац Gradc
- Village
- Nickname: Gradac
- Motto: Igri Gradac volimo te mi
- Location within Bosnia and Herzegovina
- Coordinates: 43°13′N 17°43′E
- Country: Bosnia and Herzegovina
- Entity: Federation of Bosnia and Herzegovina
- Canton: Herzegovina-Neretva
- Municipality: Čitluk

Area
  - Total: 2.73 sq mi (7.08 km^{2})

Population (2013)
  - Total: 902
  - Density: 330/sq mi (127/km^{2})
- Time zone: UTC+1 (CET)
  - Summer (DST): UTC+2 (CEST)

Krehin Gradac (Cyrillic: Крехин Градац) is a village in the municipality of Čitluk, Bosnia and Herzegovina.

== Demographics ==
In the 2013 census, Krehin Gradac's population is 902 and its ethnic makeup is:

Ethnicity	Number	Percentage
Croats	889	98.6%
Bosniaks	1	0.1%
Serbs	9	1.0%
Other/undeclared	3	0.3%
Total	902	100%
