= Čitluk, Herzegovina-Neretva Canton =

Čitluk Općina Čitluk (Croatian)
- Town and municipality
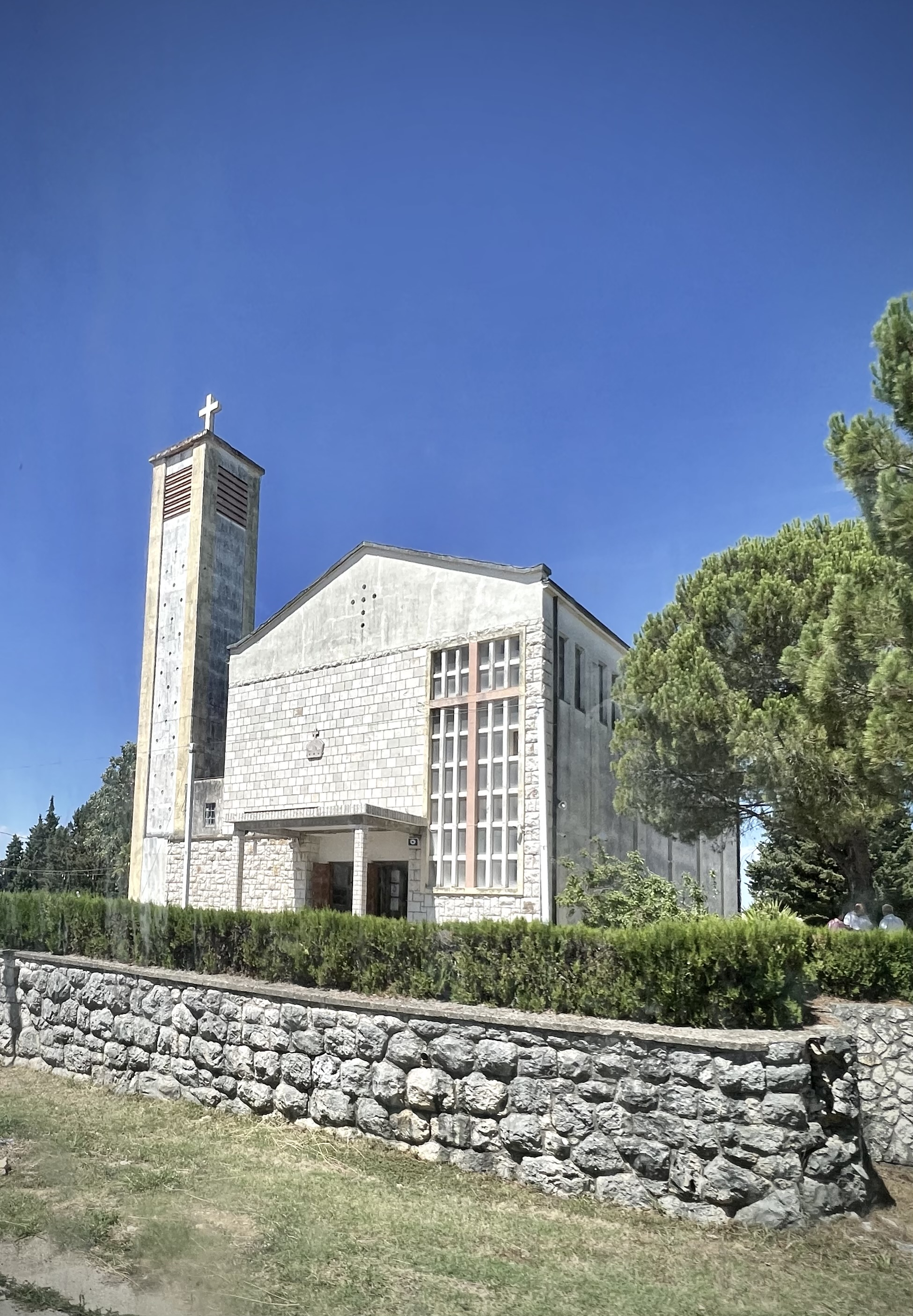
- Church of Christ the King, Čitluk

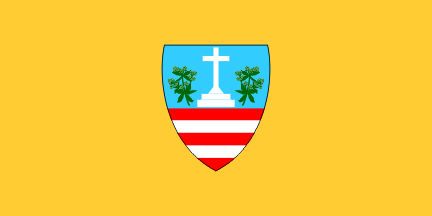
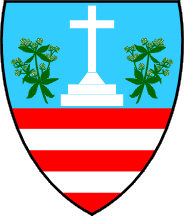
- Flag Seal

- Interactive map of Čitluk
- Location of Čitluk
- Coordinates: 43°12′N 17°42′E
- Country: Bosnia and Herzegovina
- Entity: Federation of Bosnia and Herzegovina
- Canton: Herzegovina-Neretva
- Geographical region: Herzegovina

Government
  - Municipal mayor: Marin Radišić (HDZ BiH)

Area
  - Town and municipality: 181 km^{2} (70 sq mi)

Population (2013 census)
  - Town and municipality: 18,140
  - Density: 1,025/km^{2} (2,650/sq mi)
  - Urban: 3,312
- Time zone: UTC+1 (CET)
  - Summer (DST): UTC+2 (CEST)
- Area code: +387 36
- Website: http://www.citluk.ba

Čitluk (Serbian Cyrillic: Читлук,) is a town and municipality in the Herzegovina-Neretva Canton of the Federation of Bosnia and Herzegovina, an entity of Bosnia and Herzegovina.

The area has the largest vineyards in the country, consisting mainly of Blatina, Žilavka, and Vranac grapes.

== Overview ==
The municipality includes the village of Međugorje where Marian apparitions have been reported. Other nearby places are Služanj, Potpolje, Čerin, and Hamzići.

== Settlements ==
- Bijakovići
- Biletići
- Blatnica
- Blizanci
- Čalići
- Čerin
- Čitluk
- Dobro Selo
- Dragićina
- Gradnići
- Hamzići
- Krehin Gradac
- Krućevići
- Mali Ograđenik
- Međugorje
- Paoča
- Potpolje
- Služanj
- Tepčići
- Veliki Ograđenik
- Vionica

== Demographics ==
=== 1971 ===
15,359 total

- Croats - 15,055 (98.02%)
- Bosniaks - 183 (1.19%)
- Serbs - 64 (0.41%)
- Others - 57 (0.38%)

=== 1991 ===
In 1991, the municipality had a population of 14,709, of which there were

- 14,544 Croats (98.9%)
- 110 Bosniaks (0.8%)
- 19 Serbs (0.1%)
- 17 Yugoslavs (0.1%)
- 19 others (0.1%)

=== 2013 Census ===
Municipality	Nationality						Total
Municipality	Bosniaks	%	Croats	%	Serbs	%	Total
Čitluk	29	0.15	17,900	98.67	18	0.09	18,140

== Sports ==
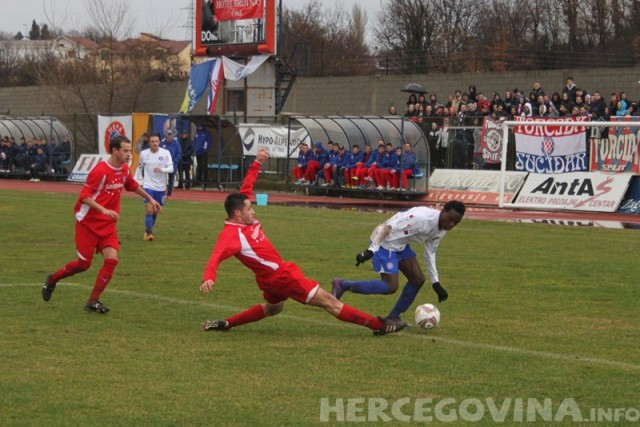
NK Brotnjo - Hajduk Split, 2013.

The town is home to the football club NK Brotnjo, and the basketball club HKK Brotnjo.

== Notable people ==
- Ivan Dodig, tennis player
- Marin Čilić, tennis player
- Zoran Planinić, basketball player
- Mate Bulić, singer
- Ivica Zubac, basketball player
- Fra Didak Buntić, Catholic priest

== Twin towns – sister cities ==
Čitluk is twinned with:

- Fossò, Italy
- Križevci, Croatia
- Poggio San Marcello, Italy
