= Blatina =

Variety of grape

- Grape (Vitis)
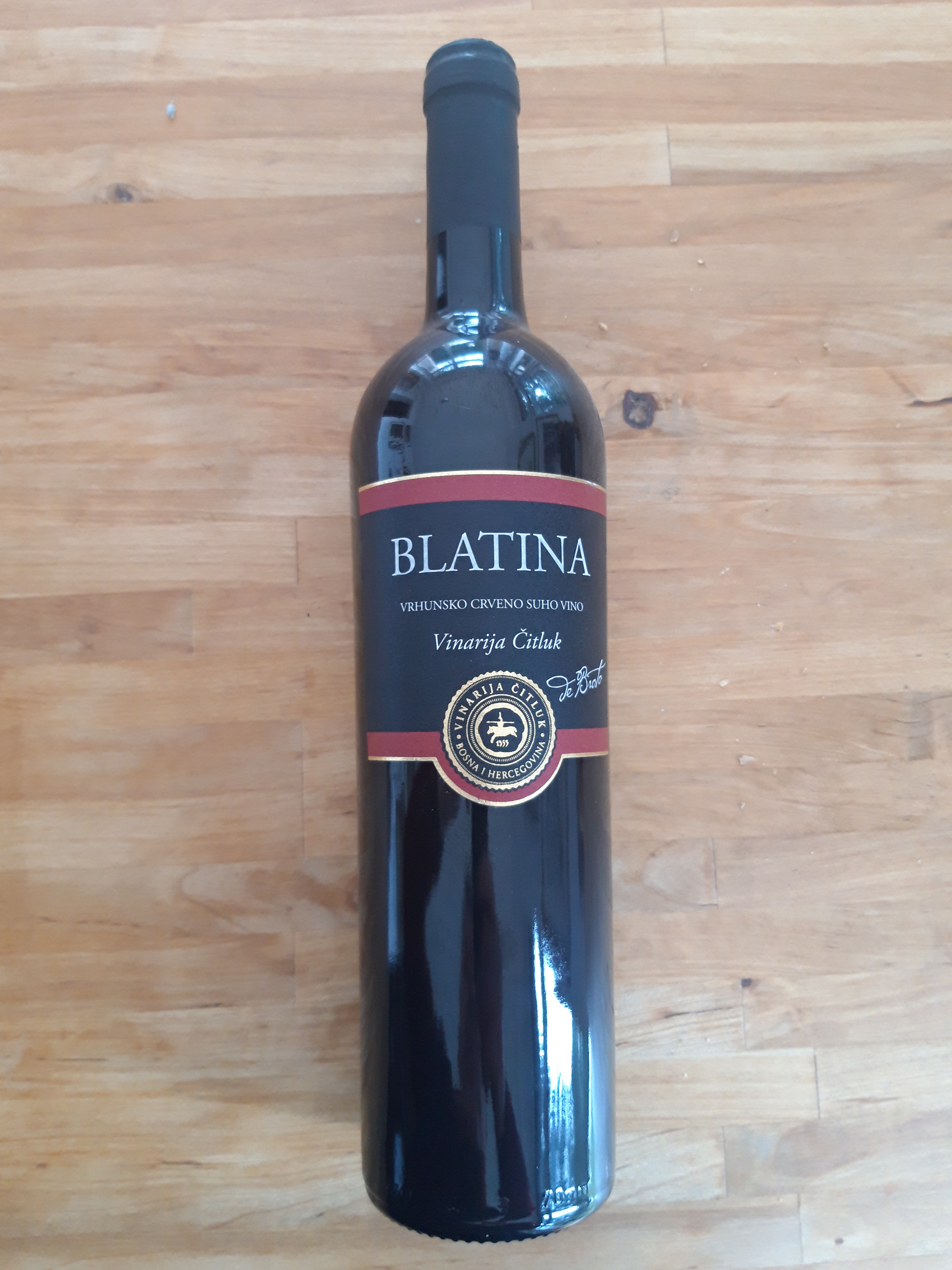
- Color of berry skin: Red
- Origin: Bosnia and Herzegovina
- Notable regions: Herzegovina
- VIVC number: 1454

Wine characteristics
- Medium climate: Spice, coffee
- Hot climate: Chocolate

Blatina (Cyrillic: Блатина) is a red wine grape variety primarily grown in the Herzegovina region of Bosnia and Herzegovina. It has a functional female flower (auto-sterile), and for that reason it is always cultivated in plantations with other varieties such as Alicante bouschet (Kambuša), Merlot, and Trnjak, which at the same time pollinate Blatina. During the period of insemination, because of the rain, it can fail in giving fruits, and it is then called "praznobačva" (empty barrel). Blatina can produce dry red wine with 12 to 13.5% of alcohol, 5 to 7 g/L of total acidity, 25-32 g/L of extract. It has a dark ruby red color.

Aged in both stainless steel and oak barrels, Blatina will often exhibit aromas and flavors that are spice and coffee-driven. Longer aging will often result in dry chocolate flavors as well.

Production is focused in the area south of Mostar around the towns of Čitluk, Međugorje, Ljubuški, and Čapljina.
