= Serbs of Croatia =

Ethnic group

Срби у Хрватској Srbi u Hrvatskoj
- Ethnic flag of Serbs of Croatia

Total population
- 123,892 (2021)

Regions with significant populations
- Eastern Slavonia and Baranya, Northern Dalmatia, Banija, Kordun, Lika

Languages
- Croatian and Serbian

Religion
- Eastern Orthodoxy (Serbian Orthodox Church)

The Serbs of Croatia or Croatian Serbs, (Note: Locally, the terms used include: Serbian: Срби у Хрватској, Srbi u Hrvatskoj (lit. 'Serbs in Croatia') Serbian: Хрватски Срби, Hrvatski Srbi (lit. 'Croatian Serbs')) are a recognized ethnic minority in Croatia. According to data from the 2021 census, the population of ethnic Serbs in Croatia is 123,892, constituting 3.2% of the total population.

In some regions of modern-day Croatia, such as southern Dalmatia, ethnic Serbs have been present from the Early Middle Ages. Serbs from modern-day Serbia and Bosnia and Herzegovina started migrating to Croatia during the Habsburg monarchy's long series of wars against the Ottoman Empire. Several migration waves of Serbs occurred after 1538, when Habsburg Monarchy granted them the right to settle on the territory of the Military Frontier, populating the Dalmatian Hinterland, Lika, Kordun, Banija, and Slavonia. In exchange for land and exemption from taxation, they had to conduct military service and participate in the protection of the border. Following the 1848 revolution and the abolition of the Military Frontier in the 1870s-1880s, rising Croatian national sentiment and the growth of Yugoslav-oriented ideas among some Serb intellectuals led to increasing political tension, culminating in the formation of the Serb Independent Party and growing rivalry with Croatian nationalist movements.

At the beginning of the 20th century, the Croat-Serb Coalition, led by the Croat Frano Supilo and the Serb Svetozar Pribićević, governed the Kingdom of Croatia-Slavonia until the dissolution of Austria-Hungary. After the creation of the Kingdom of Serbs, Croats, and Slovenes in 1918 (later renamed to Yugoslavia) and the subsequent interwar period, Serbs initially enjoyed significant political influence; however, growing Croatian demands for autonomy, culminating in the 1939 Cvetković–Maček Agreement that created the Banovina of Croatia, deepened ethnic tensions and radicalized parts of the Serb community. During World War II, Serbs were targeted for extermination as part of genocide by the Ustaše regime in the Nazi German puppet state of Independent State of Croatia. After World War II, Serbs initially held prominent positions in the communist leadership and the new socialist republic; however, from the late 1960s onward, the Croatian Spring and rising Croatian nationalism, followed by Tito’s crackdown and subsequent decentralization of Yugoslavia, gradually fueled mutual grievances that intensified in the late 1980s.

Following Croatia’s proclamation of independence and the breakup of Yugoslavia, Serbs rebelled against the Croatian government, establishing the Republic of Serbian Krajina on portions of Croatian territory, which triggered the Croatian War of Independence. The Republic of Serbian Krajina collapsed after the Croatian Army’s Operation Storm in 1995, leading to the reintegration of the territory into Croatia and the flight of around 200,000 Serbs. In the post-war period, Serbs were exposed to discriminatory measures and rhetoric, including barriers to employment, property rights, and use of the minority languages. Denial of the genocide of Serbs in the Independent State of Croatia has also been a prominent issue at times.

== History ==
=== Middle Ages ===
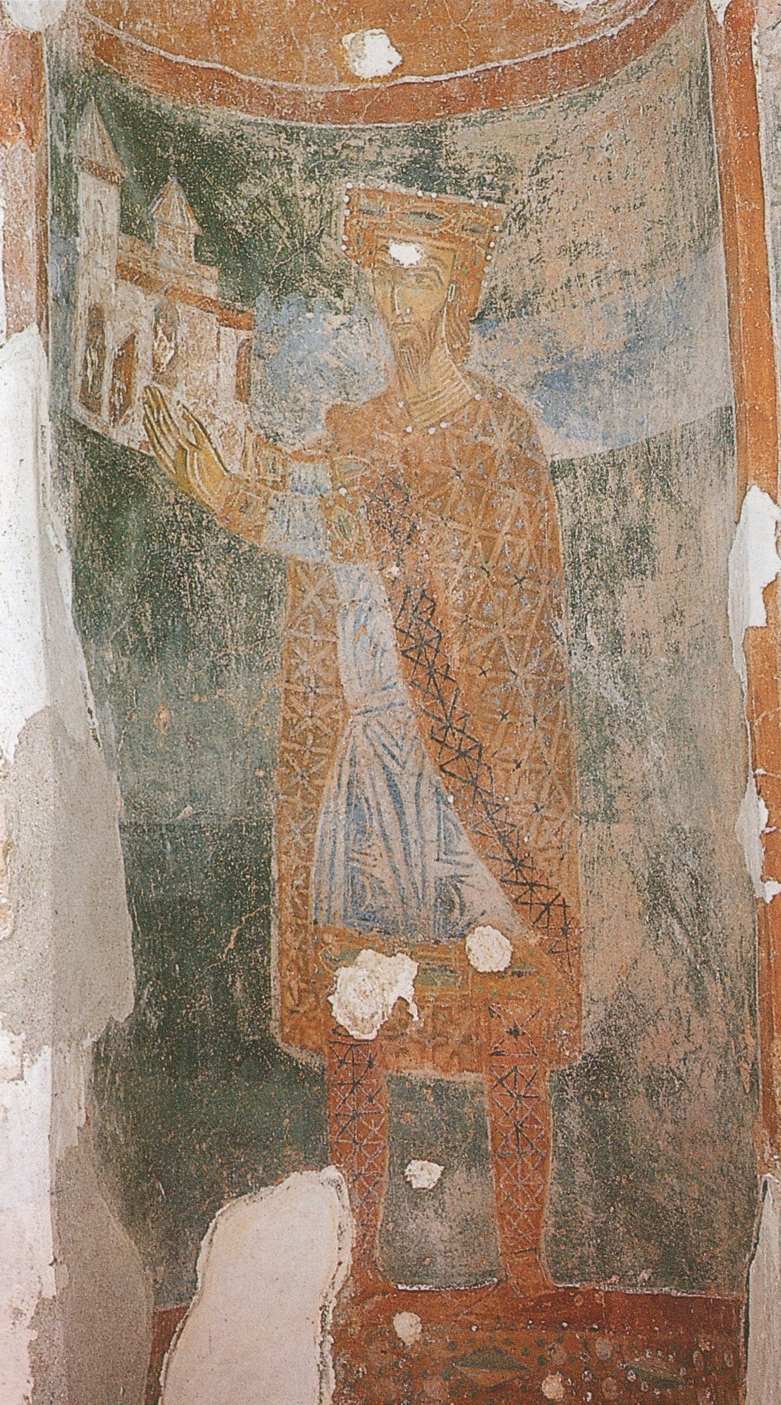
Fresco of Serbian King Mihailo I in the Church of St. Michael in Ston

In some regions that belong to modern Croatia, the presence of Serbs was attested since medieval times. Interpretation of early historical sources has been the subject of debate among scholars. Such are data from the Royal Frankish Annals, a 9th century source composed by Einhard, that mentions Serbs (under year 822) as holding a large part of Dalmatia. The scope and meaning of the term Dalmatia in that source was interpreted differently by various scholars.

Another highly debated source is the 10th-century De Administrando Imperio, composed by the Byzantine emperor and writer Constantine VII Porphyrogenitus (ruled 945-959). Scholars such as John Van Antwerp Fine Jr. and Sima Ćirković state that the lands of Konavle, Zahumlje and Pagania (which included parts of southern Dalmatia now in Croatia) are described in that source as inhabited by Serbs, who immigrated there from an area near Thessaloniki previously arrived there from the White Serbia. However, scholars Francis Dvornik, Tibor Živković, Neven Budak and Florin Curta, doubt such interpretation and state that a closer reading of the De Administrando Imperio shows that the Constantine VII's consideration about the regional population ethnic identity is based on Serbian political rule during the expansion of Časlav in the 10th century and does not indicate ethnic origin. John Fine and Noel Malcolm state that what is today western and proper Bosnia and Herzegovina was part of Croatia, while the rest was divided between Croatia and Serbia. Some members of the Serbian Vlastimirović dynasty took refuge in Croatia amid dynastic rivalry and war with the First Bulgarian Empire in the 9th and 10th centuries.

Stefan Vojislav (r. 1018–1043) ruled a territory that included the coastal region from Ston in the north down to Skadar by 1040 after his rebellion against Byzantine rule. Mihailo Vojislavljević (r. 1050–1081) built the Church of St. Michael in Ston, which has a fresco depicting him. Croatia entered union with Hungary in the beginning of the 12th century. Serbia also entered close relations with Hungary (Béla II married a Serbian princess, Helena). Beloš, a member of the Serbian royal family, became the "Ban of Croatia and Dalmatia" in 1142. By the early 13th century, the territory of Hum was under the jurisdiction of the Western i.e. Roman Church, while the Serbian Orthodox Church established the diocese of Hum in 1219, seated at Ston, linking the Pelješac peninsula with Hum which lasted until 1321 when Serbian Orthodox bishop had to withdraw from Ston. Serbia continued to hold parts of southernmost Dalmatia into the 14th century. In 1333 King of Serbia Stefan Dušan sold the Pelješac peninsula and the coastland between Ston and Dubrovnik to the Republic of Ragusa, while Ragusa had to pay an annual tribute and also had to guarantee freedom of worship for Eastern Orthodox believers in this territory.

According to Yugoslav ethnologist Jovan Erdeljanović, members of the Orlović clan settled in Lika and Senj in 1432, later joining the Uskoks. In 1436 on the Cetina, Croats, Vlachs, and Serbs appeared at the same time living on the estate of Ivan Frankopan. Serbs are reported in Hungarian documents as living in Croatia in 1437 (three documents call the Serbs in Syrmia and Slavonia as Rascianos–Rascians) and on 22 November 1447, the Hungarian King Ladislaus V wrote a letter which mentioned: "Rascians, who live in our cities of Medvedgrad, Rakovac, both Kalinik and in Koprivnica". Matthias Corvinus complained in a letter from 1462 that 200,000 people during the previous three years had been taken from his country by Ottomans, but this information was mistakenly used in Serbian and other historiographies as a reference for Serb migration to Hungary. After the Ottoman conquests of Serbia and capture of Smederevo fortress in 1459 and fall of Bosnia 1463 different populations of Eastern Orthodox Christians moved into Syrmia and by 1483 perhaps 200,000 Eastern Orthodox Christians moved into central Slavonia and Syrmia. The Turkish conquest of Bosnia also pushed refugees and migrants into eastern Croatia.

=== Early modern period ===
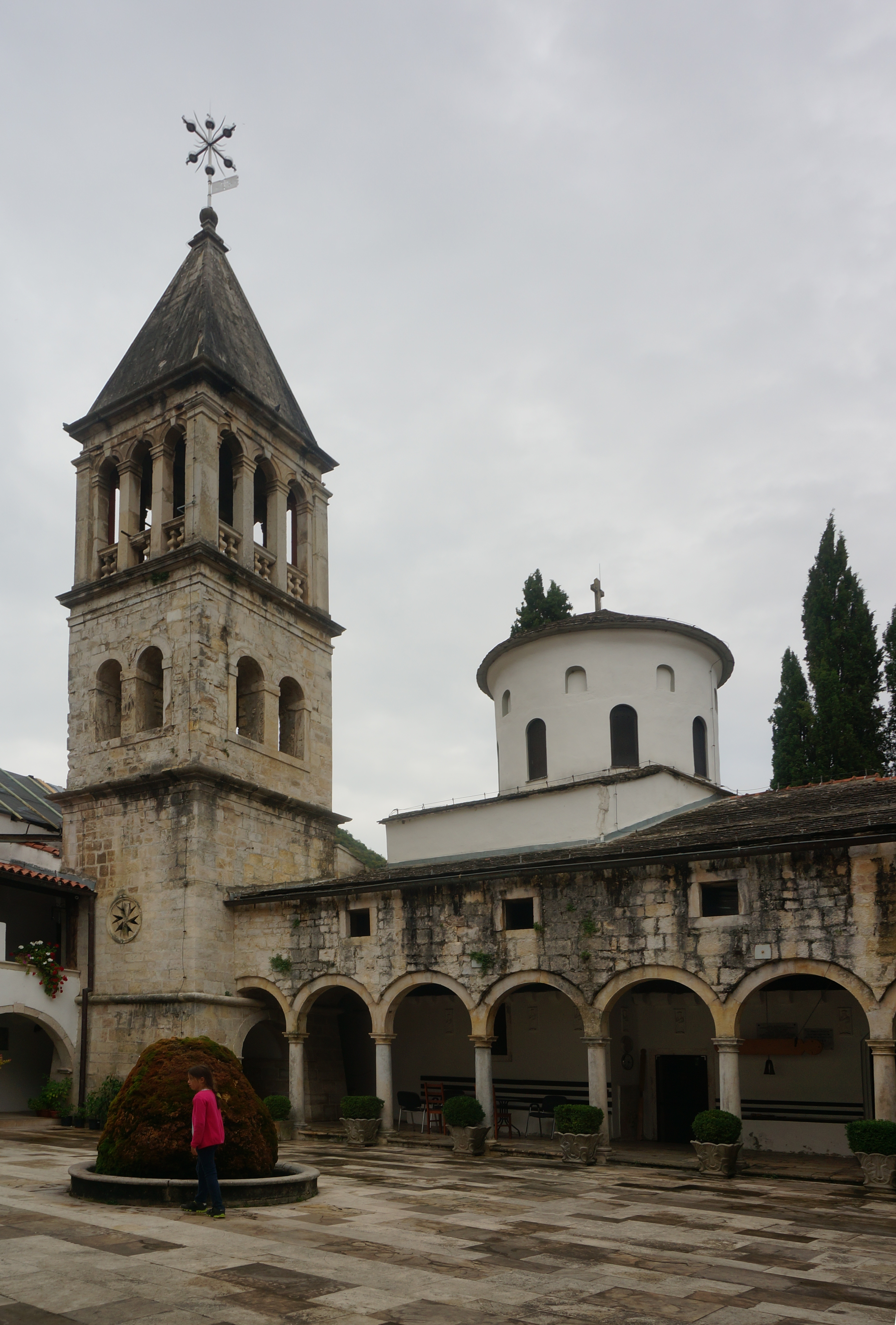
Serbian Orthodox Krka Monastery, mid-16th century

The origins of the Serbs of Croatia in the modern era lie primarily in the historical region of Herzegovina (including Old Herzegovina), from which Eastern Orthodox Christian families who spoke the Eastern Herzegovinian dialect of Shtokavian migrated en masse to the north and west during the 16th and 17th centuries. Scholar Marko Šarić states that the ethnolinguistically Slavic settlers were variously termed by contemporary sources as Rascians, Vlachs, Morlachs, Serbs, or Uskoks. The name Vlach was used not in an ethnic context, but rather to designate "a particular [pastoral] social structure and way of life." The group's ethnogenesis in Herzegovina was the outcome of interactions between Slavs and the original Vlachs, who mixed with the surrounding Slavic-speaking population while other Slavs in the region adopted pastoralism as well. The resulting migrant stream was characterized as "heterogenous" in nature.

As many former inhabitants of the Austrian-Ottoman borderland fled northwards or were captured by the Ottoman invaders, they left behind unpopulated areas that were subsequently occupied by newcomers. In the first half of the sixteenth century, settlements of Eastern Orthodox Christians were established in modern-day western Croatia as well as the Ottoman part of Slavonia; in the second part of the century, they moved to the Austrian part of Slavonia. In 1550 they established the Lepavina Monastery in northern Croatia. Other "Vlach" settlements in the region included Mali i Veliki Poganac (Poganetz), mentioned in 1610, and Marča Monastery (Eparchy of Marča).

The Habsburg Empire encouraged people from the Ottoman Empire to settle as free peasant soldiers, establishing the Military Frontiers (Militärgrenze) in 1522 (hence they were known as Grenzers, Krajišnici). The militarized frontier, which included territory in present-day Croatia, Serbia, Hungary, and Romania, was intended to serve as a buffer against Ottoman incursions. Colonists were granted small tracts of land, were exempted from some obligations, and were to retain a share of all war booty. The Grenzers elected their captains (vojvode) and magistrates (knezovi). All Eastern Orthodox settlers were promised freedom of worship. By 1538, the Croatian and Slavonian Military Frontier were established, and colonization of Habsburg lands continued well into the seventeenth century. The Military frontiers were virtually identical to modern-day Serbian settlements (war-time Republic of Serbian Krajina). Serbian communities were dotted about until the twentieth century, preserving memories of their origin.

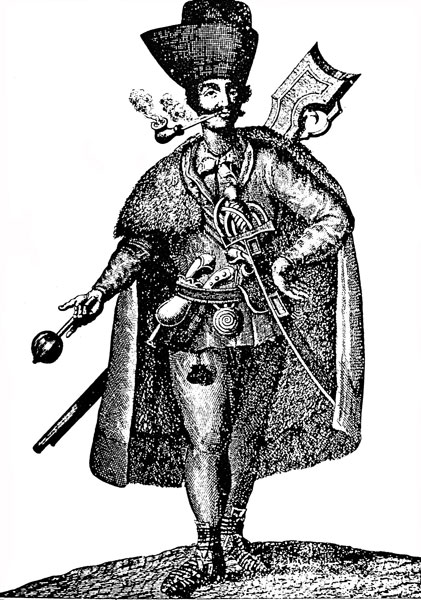
Serbian frontiersman in Syrmia, Military Frontier, 1742

There was an additional population movement from the Ottoman territories into Venetian Dalmatia during the late 17th century. The Venetian government welcomed the immigrants, as they protected possessions against the Ottomans. The so-called Morlachs, former Ottoman subjects, helped Venice triple its size in Dalmatia. In 1684, around 9,000 Serbs settled around the borders of Dalmatia. By the end of the same year, 1500 Serb families had moved from the Dalmatian Hinterland into Venetian territory, and a similar migration happened in 1685, when 600 families moved from Cetina under their chieftain Peraičić. In the summer of 1685, Stephanus Cosimi, the Archbishop of Split, wrote that Morlach leader Stojan Janković had brought 300 families with him to Dalmatia, and also that around Trogir and Split, there were 5,000 refugees from Ottoman lands without food; this was seen as a serious threat to the defense of Dalmatia. Grain sent by the Pope proved insufficient, and expeditions were launched into Ottoman territory.

Throughout the history of the Serbs in Dalmatia, the Catholic clergy, particularly through the efforts of the Archbishop of Split, sought to assert their supreme authority over the "schismatics." Some scholars have argued that the formation of the Serbian identity of the migrants' descendants in Croatia only began in the 18th century under the influence of the Serbian Orthodox Church. Most of the local Eastern Orthodox priests of the Metropolitanate of Karlovci were educated in monasteries outside Croatia under the guidance of the Serbian Orthodox Church clergy who came to the southwestern region of the Habsburg monarchy during the Great Migrations of the Serbs (1690–1739). In 1695, Serbian Patriarch Arsenije III Čarnojević organized the Serbian Orthodox Church's hierarchy in Croatia. The territory of the Military Frontier was 'subjugated' to the Eparchy of Gornji Karlovac, and Varaždin Generalate and the rest of Croatia to the Eparchy of Pakrac (since 1705). Thus, the Serbianisation of the Orthodox settlers of southern Croatia was in part the result of the hierarchical linkage between them and the Serbian Orthodox Church in northern Croatia.

Among the oldest Eastern Orthodox churches in Croatia are the monasteries of Krupa, Krka, and Dragović, and other smaller churches (in settlements Kula Atlagića, Pađene, Golubić, Miranje, Biljane, Ostrovica, Karin, Biovičino Selo, Đevrske, Kistanje, Žagrović, Radučić, Mokro Polje, Benkovac, Dragišić-Grabovci, Bratiškovci, Kosovo-Markovac, Morpolača, Žegar, Plavno, Drniš, Ervenik, Kolarina, Brgud, Vrbnik, Kričke, Islam Grčki, Dobropoljci among others). These churches were converted to Eastern Orthodoxy in the mid-16th century and later, since Ottomans were forbidding building of new Christian churches. The claim that they date back to the 14-15th century is controversial and unlikely, as they display Romanesque and Gothic architectural features that are unusual for Byzantine-Orthodox churches. Additionally, Eastern Orthodoxy did not exist in Croatia before the Ottoman conquest, which further challenges such dating of these churches.

=== Modern period ===
In the 1860s, Serbian thought began spreading among the Eastern Orthodox Christians in the Kingdom of Dalmatia. At first through the religious denomination, and over time as a sign of national affiliation. There was also a brief occurrence when certain Catholic intellectuals, predominantly in Dubrovnik, were won over by the Serbian thought. They were known as "Serb Catholics". The reason for this was that Dalmatia and the Kingdom of Croatia-Slavonia, at the time ruled by Károly Khuen-Héderváry, were extremely disadvantaged so intellectuals did not want to link themselves to them, while at the same time, they found newly created Kingdoms of Serbia and Montenegro with their idea of unification of the South Slavs, appealing. With the creation of Yugoslavia, their political goals were achieved, and after that, these "one-time Serbs" disappeared from the political stage. Such developments in the spread of Serbian thought in the Croatian lands were the result of Serbian politicians' plans dating back to the first half of the 19th century when Serbia wasn't an independent country, but a province of the Ottoman Empire. According to the 1844 Ilija Garašanin's Načertanije, they intended to establish a Serbian Empire on the territory of the collapsed Ottoman Empire. At first, its borders were supposed to be the borders of the Ottoman Empire and the Slavs in them, but they gradually expanded to the territory of present-day Croatia (including the Military Frontier and Dalmatia). To accomplish this, the ground had to be prepared, so that diplomacy and the military would have a stronger base for taking action. The basis for this was the Serbian state law, and where it wasn't possible to appropriate the land with it, the argument of nationality, and when that argument couldn't be applied, then it was necessary to "create" the Serbs among the target population, if not among all, then among the majority. The main target was Eastern Orthodox Christians in the neighbouring, non-Serb countries. In 1848/50, the Serbian government organized a secret network of agents who propagated the Serbian ideas. Those agents were concealed as cultural workers. The famous agents were Georgije Nikolajević and Stjepan Mitrov Ljubiša. The 'creation' of new Serbs was carried out by identification of Eastern Orthodox Christianity in Croatia and Bosnia and Herzegovina only with Serbs. Another argument used in the areas with no Eastern Orthodox Christians was identifying people who spoke Shtokavian with the Serbs. The idea "all Shtokavians are Serbs" was created by German Slavists in the 1850s, and was promoted by the Austrian government who wanted to equalize Croats and Serbs so that it could more easily rule the Croatian lands and in the next stage conquer Serbia and penetrate across Macedonia to Thessaloniki. The idea was that it was easier to "govern Belgrade and Zagreb if the same language was spoken in them". Geostrategic position of Belgrade to Zagreb further contributed to favouring the Serbs whom Austrians did not perceive as a danger, unlike Croats who had their language, politicians, national consciousness, laws, military tradition and prepared army, as well as international treaties which have affirmed their rights, so Austrians needed someone (Serbs) to discipline the Croats. The same was done by Hungary which became a strong political factor after 1848 and wished to expand into the Southeast Europe, which was particularly strong during the reign of Károly Khuen-Héderváry over Croatia.

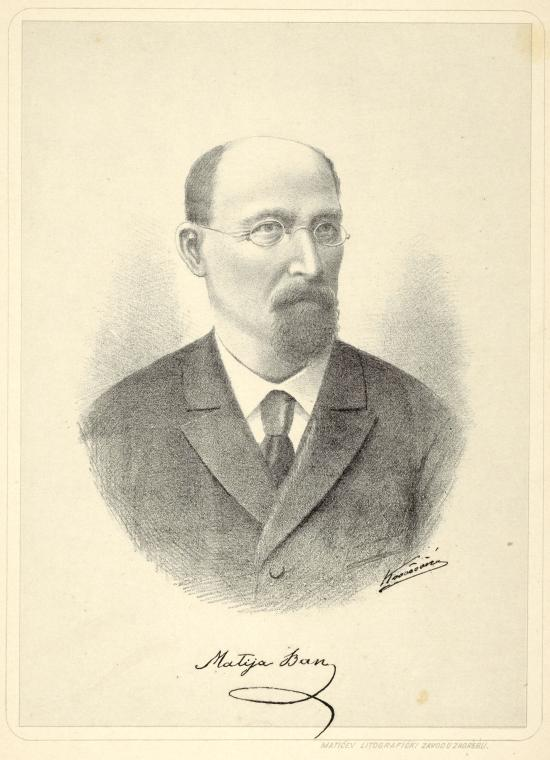
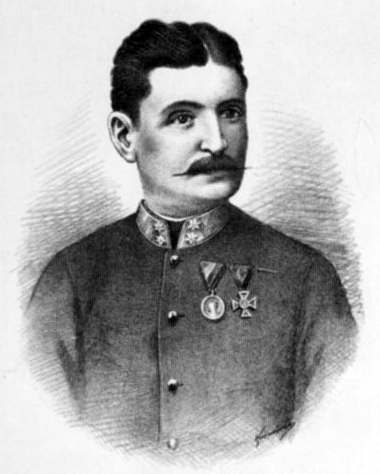
Left: Matija Ban, poet and dramatist, member of Serb-Catholic movement in Dubrovnik
Right: Josip Runjanin, composer of Croatian national anthem

The revolutionary 1848 and the process of building a modern Croatian nation resulted in closer cooperation between Croats and Serbs and recognition of their equality in the sense of Illyrian Movement (also known as the Croatian National Revival) and Yugoslavian ideas. In the 1830s, ideas of the Illyrian Movement spread to Dalmatia. In 1835, Božidar Petranović began publishing the Serbo-Dalmatian Magazine. In the following thirty years, Croats and Serbs worked together in the 'national movement' (by using this neutral name they avoided conflicts) against the Austro-Hungarian unitarian and Italian nationalists. However, since Vuk Karadžić, Ilija Garašanin and Jovan Subotić started writing of Dalmatia as a "Serbian land", and the recognition of Serbia as an independent state in 1878 Congress of Berlin, the differences between Croats and Serbs in Dalmatia increased. Following Croat enthusiasm with the successful 1878 Austro-Hungarian conquest of Bosnia and Herzegovina, during which many Croatian soldiers died, and them seeking unification of Dalmatia and the Kingdom of Croatia-Slavonia, the conflict between Croats and Serbs was inevitable. In 1879, Serbs from Bukovica voted for the Italian candidate instead of Croat Miho Klaić. This event was called by People's Party's supporters Bukovica betrail. Shortly thereafter, separate Croatian and Serbian parties emerged, but Croatian parties managed to keep the majority in the Diet of Dalmatia while Serbs started cooperating with the Italian nationalists. Before this, Serbs in Dalmatia started emphasizing Serbianism more often, and for the Croats emphasize "Slovene, Yugoslavian, Slavic, Illyrian", which Mihovil Pavlinović considered destructive to Croatia so he used only attributes "Croatian" in his political program.

Ban Ivan Mažuranić abolished Serbian education autonomy, which was carried out by the Serbian Orthodox Church, as part of his educational reforms and liberal endeavours. Despite the interpretation of this move as anti-Serbian, some of the most senior governmental positions during Mažuranić's reign were held by the Serbs; Jovan Živković was Deputy Ban, Livije Radivojević president of the Table of Seven (Supreme Court), and Nikola Krestić, president of the Croatian Parliament.

During his 20-year-long reign, marked by violence and aggressive magyarization, Ban Károly Khuen-Héderváry encouraged ethnic conflicts between Croats and Serbs. He introduced Cyrillic in grammar school and equalized it with Latin, and allowed the use of Serbian flags. He has changed the official language in the Kingdom from Croatian to "Croato-Serbian" and appointed Serb Vaso Đurđević to the position of the Speaker of the Croatian Parliament. In 1884, Parliament enacted the so-called "Serbian laws" by which Serbian Orthodox Church gained the right to independently conduct education on the Croatian territory. In addition, Khuen-Héderváry financially assisted the Serbs. During his reign, four out of eight Croatian county prefects, Deputy Ban and Speaker of the Croatian Parliament were Serbs, and Serbs occupied the highest ranks in the judiciary. The main goal of favouring the Serbs was to encourage inter-ethnic (Croat/Serb) conflicts which would lead to the prevention of Croatian resistance against the Austrian Empires' state policies. By the end of the 19th century, on the Vladimir Matijević's initiative, Serbs established several institutions such as the Serbian Bank, the Association of Serbian Agricultural Cooperatives, and the Serbian Business Association Privrednik.

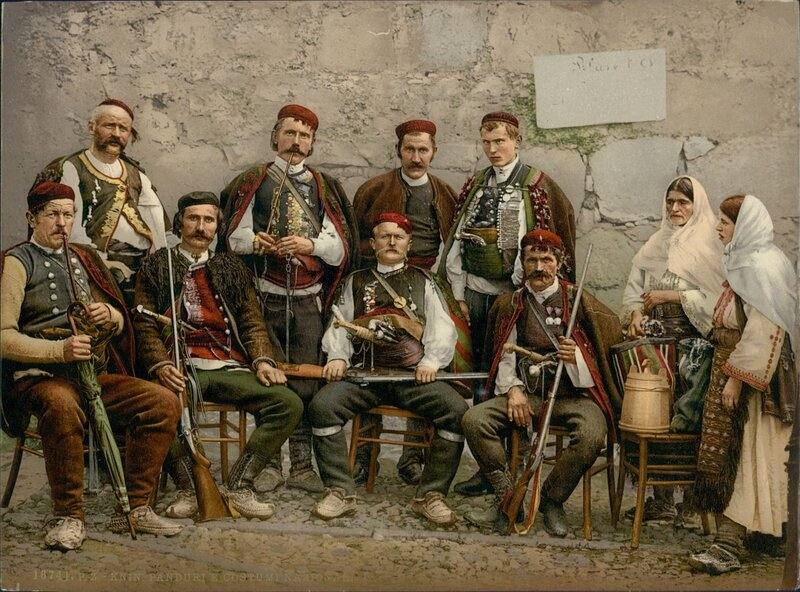
Serb national costume from Knin, 1899

In 1894, Srbobran, a journal of Serbs in Croatia, which was funded by the Serbian government, published an article titled Our First Decennial in which the author described the awakening of Croatian national consciousness and aspirations to Western values among the Eastern Orthodox Christians and the lack of indoctrination with Serbianism among the clergy; "In the Serbian church, we found many priests who didn't know who the Saint Sava was, let alone they wanted to be Sava's apostles, neither safeguard his behests, Eastern Orthodox faith and Serbian nationality nor nourish their flock within them. Among them, we found "Orthodox Croats" who preached from the Serbian enlightener Sava's ambon Croatian thought, and Latin was more dear to them then Cyrillic." The Croatian-Serbian conflict culminated on 10 August 1902, when, after years of controversial writing, Srbobran published a text titled To the Extermination of Yours or Ours in which author Nikola Stojanović, President of the Serbian Academic Society Zora, denied the very existence of the Croatian nation and predicted the result of the conflict between Croats and Serbs, calling for destruction: "That struggle must lead to the investigation ours or yours. One party must fall. Their geographical position, circumstances in which they live everywhere mixed with the Serbs, and the process of general evolution where the idea of Serbianism means progress, guarantees us that those [falling] will be Croats." Enraged crowds reacted by burning Serbian flags and attacking Serb-owned shops, and buildings used by the Serbian institutions.

Formation of the so-called New Course Policies in the first decade of the 20th century was a turning point for the resumption of cooperation between Croats and Serbs to fight for common interests, as confirmed by the 1905 Zadar Resolution when the Croats agreed on broad concessions regarding flags, education, language and equality of Serbs. This led to the creation of the Croat-Serb Coalition whose policy was based on cooperation with Hungary, the Italian parties in Dalmatia and the Serbs in Croatia and Slavonia, guaranteeing broad concessions regarding the Serb minority in Croatia. Serbs played a disproportionately large role in the political life of the Kingdom of Croatia-Slavonia. Electoral units were not created according to the population but were gerrymandered according to the Governments' interests so, for example, in the 1913 parliamentary election, the Croatian Peasant Party received 12,917 votes and only 3 seats, while the Serb Independent Party received 11,704 votes and 17 seats. Serbs Mišćević, Pribićević, Krajnović, and Budisavljević received 1,062 votes, which was enough for all four of them to get elected, while Croat M. Uroić from the Party of Rights won 1,138 votes but hadn't been elected. According to the 1910 census, 644,955 Serbs lived on the territory of the Kingdom of Croatia-Slavonia, accounting for 24.5% of the population. In 1900, 95,000 Serbs, accounting for 16% of the population, lived in the Kingdom of Dalmatia.

=== World War I and Kingdom of Yugoslavia ===
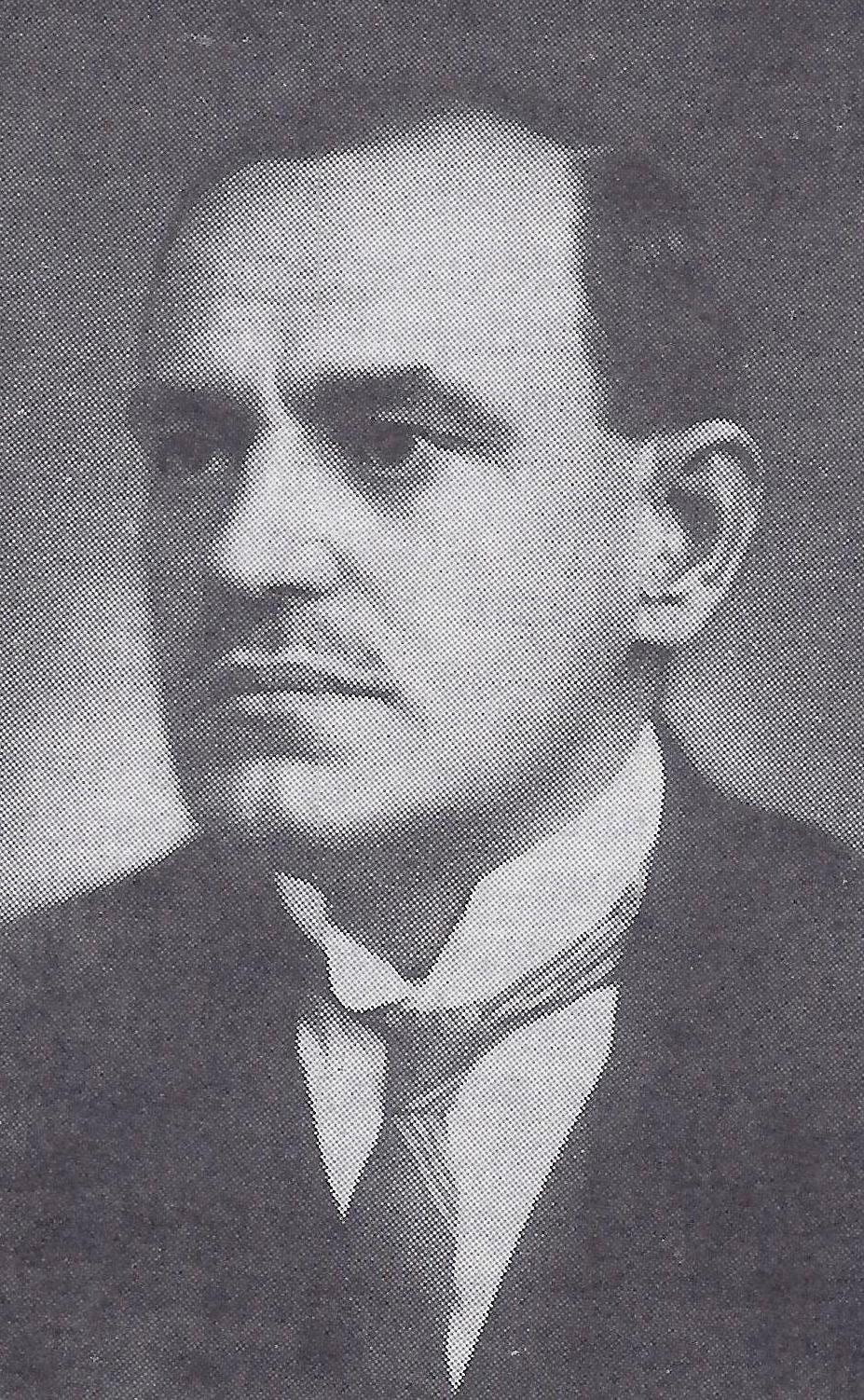
Svetozar Pribićević, one of the founders of the Croat-Serb Coalition and vice-president of the State of Slovenes, Croats and Serbs

Immediately upon the outbreak of the World War I, all organizations that the government considered favoured the unification of South Slavs or Serbia, which was on the side of the Allied Powers, were banned. Josip Frank's associates took advantage of some provocations and the anger of the people after the assassination of Archduke Franz Ferdinand by Serb Gavrilo Princip and organized anti-Serbian demonstrations. After a stone was thrown on a parade in which the image of Franz Ferdinand was carried through Zagreb, many cafés and gathering places of pro-Yugoslav politicians as well as Serb-owned shops were demolished. Croat-Serb Coalition MP's were also attacked. On the other hand, members of the Social Democratic Party of Croatia and Slavonia held a rally in which they spoke against the violence. Simultaneously with the large anti-Serbian protests held in Vienna, Budapest and Bosnia and Herzegovina, in which there were wounded and dead, protests against pro-Yugoslav oriented citizens were held in many Croatian cities, including Dubrovnik, in which protesters attacked Serbian Society "Dušan Magnificant" Riots have been reported in Zadar, Metković, Bjelovar, Virovitica and Konavle where protesters burned the Serbian flag. In Đakovo and Slavonski Brod riots become so violent that the army intervention was requested. In addition, a curfew was imposed in the town of Petrinja. In Vukovar and Zemun police managed to prevent more clashes. Most Serbs in Croatia approved assassination. Cases of provocation, such as showing images of King Peter I of Serbia, joy, insults and celebrations, have been reported. 14 Serbs were arrested in Zadar for celebrating the assassination.

Following the end of World War I, previously independent State of Slovenes, Croats and Serbs and Kingdom of Serbia merged in 1918 into the Kingdom of Yugoslavia. The creation of the Kingdom of Yugoslavia led to the formation of stronger ties between Serbs in Croatia and Bosnia and Herzegovina with Serbia. Immediately after 1918, the influx of Serbs from Serbia into the territory of Croatia, in particular in Syrmia and Lika-Krbava counties, increased. Relative growth in the number of Serbs was recorded in Virovitica (35% increase) as well as in Syrmia and Modruš-Rijeka counties, mainly due to the migration of Serbian war veterans who fought on Macedonian front to Slavonia during agrarian reform which was organized by the authorities. Thus, 25 settlements for volunteers were erected, and 8,000 families settled on the land in the areas of agrarian offices in Osijek and Vukovar. Although most of the Serb parties in Croatia have been co-operating with Croatian Peasant Party in the struggle against Serbian unitarianism for years, following the creation of Banovina of Croatia in 1939, part of Serbs showed a lack of willingness to live in a country with Croat majority. There were also requests for joining the Lika and Kordun districts with the Vrbas Banovina which had a Serb ethnic majority.

=== World War II ===
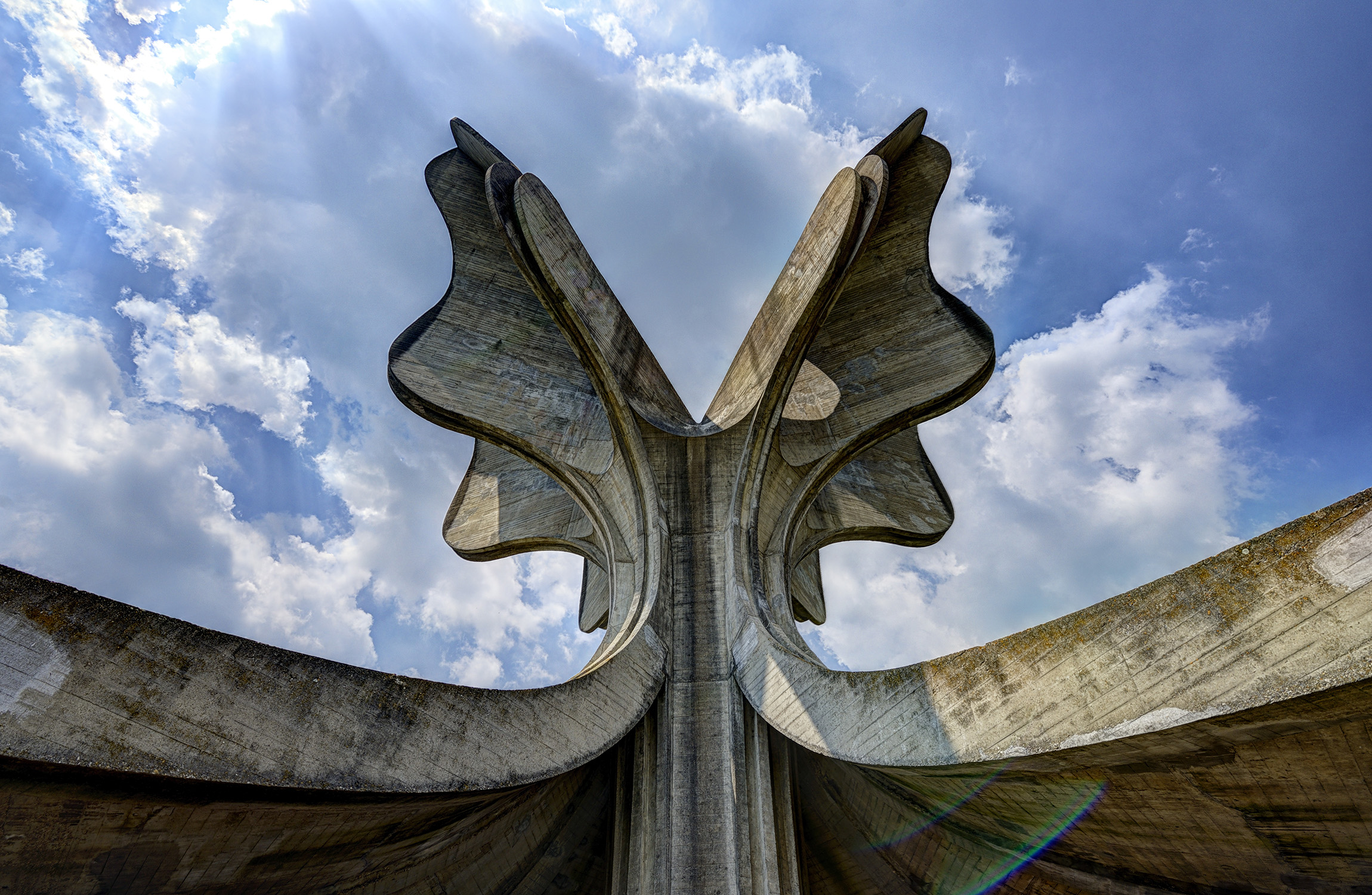
Stone Flower, a monument to the victims of Jasenovac death camp, which was part of the Genocide of Serbs

Following the Invasion of Yugoslavia in April 1941, the Axis powers occupied the entire territory of the Kingdom of Yugoslavia and established a puppet state, the so-called Independent State of Croatia on the territory of present-day Bosnia and Herzegovina and Croatia. The Ustaše government saw Serbs, Jews, Romanis and antifascist Croats as a disruptive element and enemies of the Croatian people, and immediately started with their prosecution. One-third of Serbs were to be killed, one-third expelled and one-third forcibly converted to Catholicism, according to a formula devised by Ustaše ministers. Upon the establishment of the Independent State of Croatia, Ustaše officials immediately began making harsh statements against the Serbs. Although some of the prominent Serbs first offered cooperation to the new Ustaše government, Serbs were outlawed. During the first months of Independent State of Croatia's existence, numerous legal decisions were made against the Serbs: they had to leave the public service, had to move to the northern parts of Zagreb, could walk through Zagreb only during the day, had to wear a badge with the letter "P" (stood for "Pravoslavni", meaning Eastern Orthodox Christians), The name of their faith was changed from Serbian Orthodox to Greek-Eastern, and usage of the Cyrillic script was prohibited. Ustaše were making lists of Serbs which they used for deportations to German-occupied Serbia. About 175,000 Serbs were deported from Independent State of Croatia to Serbia during the first two years of Independent State of Croatia's existence. The regime systematically and brutally massacred Serbs in villages in the countryside, using a variety of tools. In addition, Nazi-style concentration camps were set up for enemies of the state, the most notorious being Jasenovac where some 50,000 Serbs were killed. Sisak and Jastrebarsko concentration camp were specially formed for children. During the war, around 300,000 Serbs are estimated to have been murdered under the Ustashe regime as a result of their genocide campaign. Diana Budisavljević, a humanitarian of Austrian descent, carried out rescue operations and saved more than 15,000 children from Ustashe camps. Budisavljević and her team was assisted by the Croatian Red Cross and the Zagreb Archdiocese branch of Caritas. Thousands of rescued Serb children were placed with ethnic Croat families from Zagreb and rural communities.

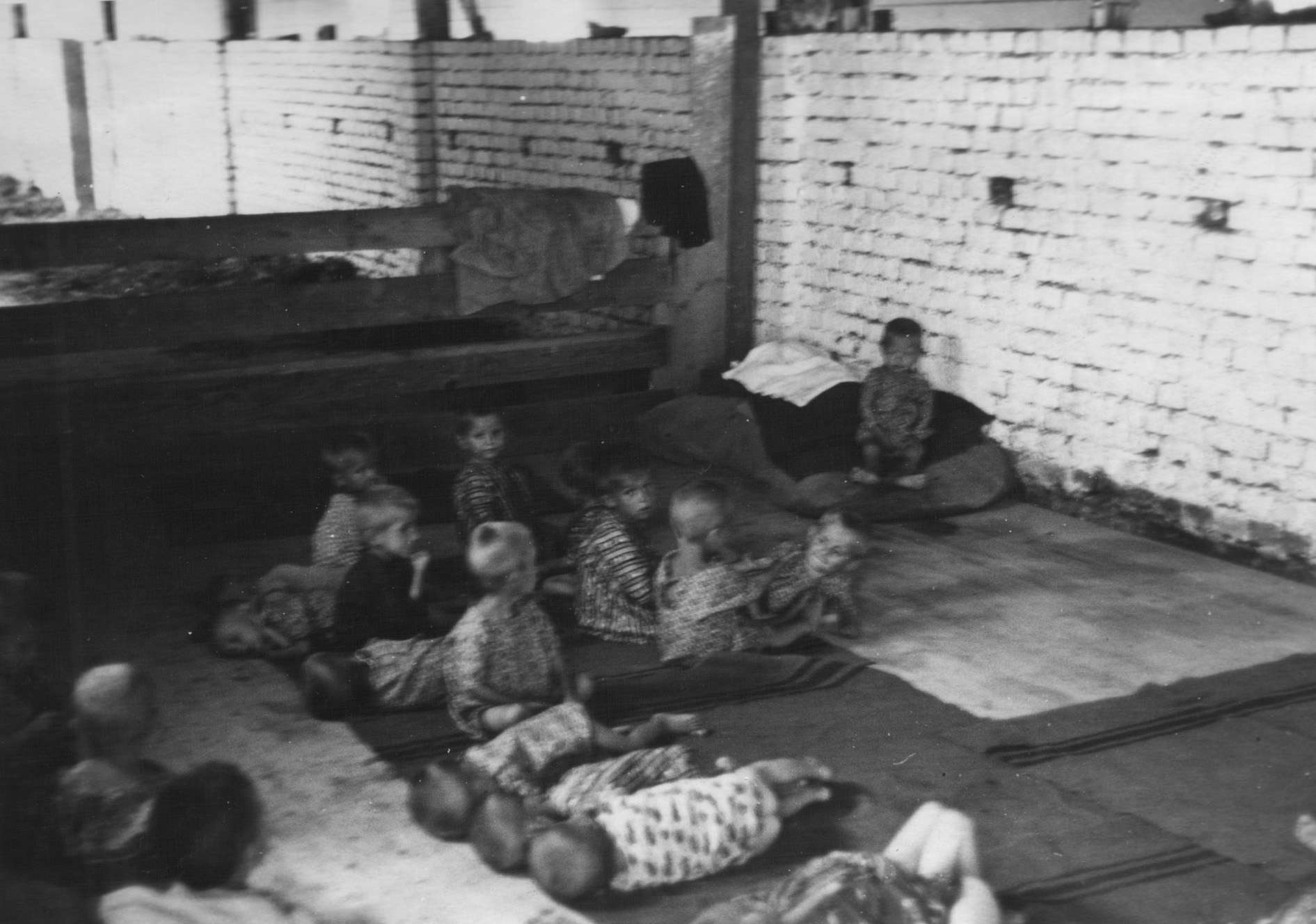
Prisoners at the Sisak concentration camp, a detention site established for children

The Ustasha policy towards Serbs further drove a number of them to join either Chetniks or the Yugoslav Partisans who were particularly strong in the regions of Lika, Kordun, and Banija. In 1941–42 most Partisans fighting in Croatia were Serbs, but by October 1943 the majority were Croats. This change was partly due to the decision of a key Croatian Peasant Party member, Božidar Magovac, to join the Partisans in June 1943, and partly due to the surrender of Italy in September 1943. Furthermore, Ustashe authorities ceding Northern Dalmatia to fascist Italy, Italian terror of the population and misrule of the Ustashe and Axis invaders would further push Croats towards the partisans. At the moment of the capitulation of Italy to the Allies, the Serbs and Croats were participating equally according to their respective population sizes as it was in Yugoslavia as a whole. By the end of the war, the Serb share of Partisans in Croatia had fallen sharply in favor of Croats, dropping to 28.6% in 1944. The Serb contribution to Croatian Partisans represented more than their proportion of the local population.

After the invasion of Yugoslavia by Axis forces, Serbian uprisings broke out under the Chetnik leadership in Gračac, Srb, Donji Lapac, Drvar, and Bosansko Grahovo. The uprisings in the Independent State of Croatia were a reaction to the genocide policies of the Ustaše towards the Serbs. The policy of the Chetniks under the leadership of Draža Mihailović varied from the struggle with the Nazis to tactical or selective collaboration with them in different periods throughout the war. The Chetnik movement operated as "legalised" auxiliary forces under Axis control. They had collaboration agreements with the Italians in occupied Dalmatia and, after the Italian capitulation in September 1943, with the Germans directly. They also collaborated with some of the Ustashe forces in northern Bosnia and they fought together against the Yugoslav Partisans during the Case White. Contracting parties obliged to a joint struggle against the Partisans, in return, Serb villages would be protected by the Independent State of Croatia authorities together with the Chetniks from "attacks by communists, so-called Partisans". The goal of the Chetniks, based on a 1941 directive, was the creation of an ethnically homogeneous Greater Serbia. The largest Chetnik massacres took place in eastern Bosnia within the NDH where they preceded any significant Ustashe operations. In the territories they controlled, Chetniks committed genocide against the Croat and Muslim civilian populations. Estimates of the number of deaths caused by the Chetniks in Croatia and Bosnia and Herzegovina range from 50,000 to 68,000. In April 1943, Đujić's Chetniks set up a prison and execution site in the village of Kosovo (today's Biskupija), near Knin. Thousands of local civilians, (both Croats and even Serb Anti-Fascists) including women and children, as well as captured Partisans, were held and mistreated at this prison, while hundreds of prisoners (as many as over 1,000) were tortured and killed at an execution site near a ravine close to the camp. Chetnik propaganda claimed that the Partisan resistance consisted of Jews. Some Jews who hid in the countryside were killed and robbed by Chetniks. As the Chetniks increased their cooperation with the Germans, their attitude toward the Jews in the areas under their control deteriorated, and they identified the Jews with the hated Communists. There were many instances of Chetniks murdering Jews or handing them over to the Germans.

A certain change in relations towards Serbs in the Independent State of Croatia took place in the spring of 1942 on German demand, as the Germans realized that the Ustaše policy towards Serbs strengthened their rebellion, which was putting pressure on the German army that had to send more of its troops to the Independent State of Croatia territory. Afterwards, Ustaše founded the Croatian Orthodox Church and Serbs were recruited to the Croatian Home Guard units. Ustaše stopped with deportations of Serbs and their forced conversions to Catholicism. However, these measures did not significantly affect the Serb rebellion. The establishment of the Church was done to try and pacify the state as well as to Croatisize the remaining Serb population once the Ustaše realized that the complete eradication of Serbs in the NDH was unattainable. Persecution of Serbs continued, however, but was less intense. At the beginning of 1942, Independent State of Croatia authorities started making agreements with the Chetniks to avoid conflicts and coordinate actions against the Yugoslav Partisans. In 1944 the Chetniks recognized the sovereignty of the Independent State of Croatia and became a legalized movement in it. The necessary ammunition and provisions were supplied to the Chetniks by the Ustaše military. Chetniks who were wounded in such operations would be cared for in Independent State of Croatia hospitals, while the orphans and widows of Chetniks killed in action would be supported by the Ustaše state. The agreements did not stop crimes against Serbs by the Ustaše or against Muslims and Croats by the Chetniks. In early May 1945 Chetnik forces withdrew through Ustaše-held Zagreb; many of these were later killed, along with captured Ustaše, by the Partisans as part of the Bleiburg repatriations. On 8 May 1945, Yugoslav Partisans entered Zagreb, which marked the collapse of the Ustaše regime and the liberation of Croatia from the Nazi occupation. Following the end of the war, Croatia entered union with Bosnia and Herzegovina, Macedonia, Montenegro, Serbia, and Slovenia and formed the Socialist Federal Republic of Yugoslavia.

=== Socialist Yugoslavia ===
During the Second World War, at the Second and Third sessions of the National Anti-Fascist Council of the Peoples Liberation of Croatia (ZAVNOH) held in October 1943 and May 1944 respectively, the equality of the Serbian and Croatian nations, as constituent nations of the federal unit of Croatia, was recognized in every aspect. Later, in 1963, the Croatian Constitution did not mention the Serbs in Croatia as a constituent nation of Socialist Republic of Croatia. Constitution of 1974 defined Croatia as a "national state of Croatian people, state of Serbian people in Croatia and state of other nationalities that live in it". Throughout the existence of the Socialist Republic of Croatia, ethnic Serbs occupied a much larger share of posts in the political and security apparatus of the state. Though comprising slightly more than 14% of the republic's population, Serbs made up nearly 25% of total party membership in the League of Communists of Croatia in 1974. Serbs accounted for nearly half of the republic's internal affairs apparatus, nearly a third of the Croatian state security apparatus, and a substantially larger proportion of personnel in all government organs in the republic relative to their population.

=== Croatian War of Independence ===
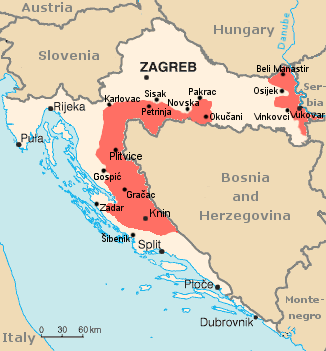
Territorial extent of Republic of Serbian Krajina

Amid rising Serbian nationalism and tensions between Yugoslav republics during the breakup of Yugoslavia, on 8 July 1989 Serbs held a rally in Knin during which numerous Chetnik symbols were exhibited and a Yugoslav People's Army intervention against Croatia was invoked. With the introduction of the multiparty system, the first ethnic Serb parties were founded in Croatia, the largest being Serb Democratic Party. Soon afterwards, extremist leaders of the Serb movements in Lika, Northern Dalmatia, Kordun, and Podunavlje called for armed rebellion against the Croatian government, and violence against Croats and refused to recognize legally elected Croatian authorities. By this point, several opposition parties in Serbia, such as Vojislav Šešelj's Serbian Radical Party, were openly calling for a Greater Serbia that would incorporate Serbs living in different regions of Yugoslavia into one state, rejecting the then existing boundaries of the republics as the artificial creation of Tito's Partisans. The crisis in Yugoslavia was further fueled by Serbian President Slobodan Milošević, who supported these groups. Milošević "endorsed a Serbian nationalist agenda" and "exploited a growing wave of Serbian nationalism to strengthen centralised rule in the Socialist Federal Republic of Yugoslavia". The republics of Croatia and Slovenia eventually sought to secede from Yugoslavia following disagreements between the republics regarding the structure of the federal government.

Tension grew following the Croatian Democratic Union's victory in the 1990 general election, led by Franjo Tudjman, since one of its political goals was Croatia's independence from Yugoslavia. Jovan Rašković, leader of the Serb Democratic Party, refused to participate in the work of the Croatian Parliament in May 1990. Some prominent Serbian politicians and scientists, such as Simo Rajić and Jovan Bamburać, called for coexistence, de-escalation and peace, while others organized Serb parties in the Croatian government-controlled areas, like Milan Đukić, while others, like Veljko Džakula, unsuccessfully tried to organize the parties in the rebelled areas, but their work was prevented by Serb nationalists. On 17 August 1990, part of the Croatian Serbs, supported by Serbia, rebelled against Croatian government in the so-called Log Revolution.

On 22 December 1990, the Croatian Parliament ratified a new constitution in which Serbs were classified as a national minority. Previously Serbs were considered autochthonous constituent of Croatia. In the first paragraph of Article 12, Croatian was specified as the official language and alphabet, and dual-language road signs were torn down even in Serb-majority areas. Furthermore, a number of Serbs were removed from the bureaucracies and the police and replaced by ethnic Croats. Many Serbs in government lost their jobs, and Croatian Democratic Union made them target of Serbian propaganda by having party members attempting to rehabilitate the World War II Croatian fascist movement Ustaše, or by saying that the numbers of people killed in Jasenovac, one of the largest extermination camp in Europe, were inflated. The proclamation of the new constitution was considered by Serbian leaders as evidence of Croat hostility towards Serbs. Thus, Serb Democratic Party, which rejected the new constitution, began building its national governmental entity to preserve rights that Serbs saw as being stripped away and to enhance the sovereignty of the Croatian Serbs. Some historians argue that the significant contributions of Serbs to Croatian cultural, scientific, and political history were effectively annulled or marginalized by policies and actions under president Franjo Tuđman in the 1990s. Some scholars have argued that Tuđman's regime "promoted a traditionalist and exclusive vision of Croatia" as a Croat state in which Serbs were "unwelcome", while certain journalists claimed to have transcript documents of a meeting that supposedly showed Tuđman had "planned ethnic cleansing and other war crimes", including "Croatia’s final solution" of its Serbian problem. Under the influence of propaganda and with the support from Serbia as well as in response to actions by President Tudjman's administration, rebelled Serbs established an unrecognized state called Republic of Serbian Krajina in hopes of achieving independence and complete self-governance from Croatia. As the popularity of the unification of Republic of Serbian Krajina with Serbia into a Greater Serbia increased, the rebellion against Croatia became more intense. The Republic of Serbian Krajina had de facto control one-fourth of Croatian territory during its existence between 1991 and 1995 but failed to gain any international recognition. According to the International Criminal Tribunal for the former Yugoslavia, the Republic of Serbian Krajina implemented policies "which advanced the objective to forcibly and permanently remove the majority of Croat and other non-Serb populations from approximately the one-third of Croatia".

In the spring of 1991, an open war broke out. Serb forces, in cooperation with the local Serb authorities, commenced persecutions to drive the Croat and other non-Serb populations from areas such as Krajina, controlled by rebelled Serbs. Nearly all non-Serbs were expelled; between 170,000 (according to the ICTY), 250,000 (according to Human Rights Watch) and 500,000 (according to the UNHCR), and hundreds of Croat and other non-Serb civilians were killed. There were numerous instances of war crimes against Croat civilians and prisoners of war perpetrated by Serb and Yugoslav forces in Croatia. Among them, the Dalj massacre, the Lovas killings, the Baćin massacre, the Voćin massacre, the Vukovar massacre, the Škabrnja massacre, the Tovarnik massacre, the Široka Kula massacre, Petrinja killings, and the Zagreb rocket attacks. According to the Croatian Association of Prisoners in Serbian Concentration Camps, a total of 8,000 Croatian civilians and prisoners of war (a large number after the fall of Vukovar) went through Serb prison camps such as Velepromet camp, Sremska Mitrovica camp, Stajićevo camp, Begejci camp and others where they were subjected to abuse and torture. A total of 300 people died in them.

Meanwhile, Serbs living in Croatian towns, especially those near the front lines, were subjected to various forms of discrimination and harassment. Croatian Serbs in Eastern and Western Slavonia and parts of the Krajina, were also forced to flee or were expelled by Croatian forces, though on a restricted scale and in lesser numbers. The Croatian Government sought to stop such occurrences and were not a part of the Government's policy. War crimes were also committed by Croatian forces against Serb civilians. Serb prisoners were detained and tortured in camps such as Lora, Pakračka Poljana, and Marino Selo. The war ended with a Croatian military success in Operation Storm in 1995 and subsequent peaceful reintegration of the remaining renegade territory in eastern Slavonia in 1998 as a result of the signed Erdut Agreement from 1995. Local Serbs, on the ground that the Agreement established the Serb National Council and gained the right to establish the Joint Council of Municipalities. During and in the aftermath of Operation Storm about 200,000 Serbs fled from the terriotories of the Republic of Serbian Krajina and hundreds of mainly elderly Serb civilians were killed in the aftermath. Throughout the war, nearly 7,950 Serbs were killed including 2,344 civilians while almost 16,000 Croats were killed, of which 6,605 were civilians. The conflict led to the displacement of 250,000 Croats and between 250,000 and 300,000 Serbs.

In 2015, during the Croatia–Serbia genocide case, the International Court of Justice unanimously dismissed the Serbian lawsuit claim that Operation Storm constituted genocide, ruling that Croatia did not have the specific intent to exterminate the country's Serb minority, though it reaffirmed that serious crimes against Serb civilians had taken place. The judgment stated that it is not disputed that a substantial part of the Serb population fled that region as a direct consequence of the military actions. Although it has also been noted that there was an evacuation order given by the RSK's "Supreme Defence Council", based on the testimony by commander Mile Mrkšić at the ICTY. The Croatian authorities were aware that the operation would provoke a mass exodus; they even to some extent predicated their military planning on such an exodus, which they considered not only probable but desirable. Fleeing civilians and people remaining in United Nations protected areas were subject to various forms of harassment, including military assaults and acts by Croatian civilians. On 8 August, a refugee column was shelled. Although it was very difficult to determine the number of properties destroyed during and after Operation Storm since a large number of houses sustained some degree of damage since the beginning of the war, Human Rights Watch estimated that more than 5,000 houses were destroyed in the area during and after the battle. Out of the 122 Serbian Orthodox churches in the area, one was destroyed and 17 were damaged. The Human Rights Watch also reported that the vast majority of the abuses were committed by Croatian forces. These abuses, which continued on a large scale even months after Operation Storm, included summary executions of elderly and infirm Serbs who remained behind and the wholesale burning and destruction of Serbian villages and property. In the months following the August offensive, at least 150 Serb civilians were summarily executed and another 110 persons forcibly disappeared. Three Croatian generals, involved in the Operation Storm, were later acquitted by the International Criminal Tribunal for the Former Yugoslavia of charges of committing war crimes and partaking in a joint criminal enterprise to force the Serb population out of Croatia. The tribunal stated that the Croatian Army and Special Police committed a large number of crimes against the Serb population after the artillery assault, but that the state and military leadership was not responsible for their creation and organizing. Examples of crimes are massacres, most often elderly Serb villagers killed by the Croatian Army, such as the Varivode massacre, the Kijani massacre, and the Golubić massacre.

At the International Criminal Tribunal for the Former Yugoslavia, Milan Babić was indicted, pleaded guilty and was convicted for "persecutions on political, racial and religious grounds, a crime against humanity". Babić stated during his trial that "during the events, and in particular at the beginning of his political career, he was strongly influenced and misled by Serbian propaganda". The president of the Republic of Serbian Krajina, Milan Martić, was also trialed by the International Criminal Tribunal for the Former Yugoslavia for various crimes against humanity and war crimes, including murder, persecution, inhumane treatment, forced displacement, plunder of public or private property, and wanton destruction of cities, towns or villages, as well as ordering an indiscriminate rocket attack on Zagreb, in 1995. In 2007, Martić was sentenced to 35 years in prison. His sentence of 35 years in prison was confirmed by tribunal's appellate council in 2008. He was found to have been part of a "joint criminal enterprise" which included Blagoje Adžić, Milan Babić, Radmilo Bogdanović, Veljko Kadijević, Radovan Karadžić, Slobodan Milošević, Ratko Mladić, Vojislav Šešelj, Franko Simatović, Jovica Stanišić, and Dragan Vasiljković.

A small minority of the pre-war Serb population have returned to Croatia. Today, the majority of the pre-war Serb population from Croatia settled in Serbia and Republika Srpska. After Croatian and other Yugoslav Wars, Serbia became home to the highest number of refugees (Serbs who fled from Bosnia and Herzegovina and Croatia) in Europe. The percentage of those declaring themselves as Serbs, according to data from the 1991 census, stood at 12.2% (78.1% of the population declared itself to be Croat). Although Serbs are formally able to return to Croatia, a majority choose to remain citizens of other countries in which they gained citizenship. Croatia also adopted discriminatory measures to prevent the return of Serbs after the war, while the Croatian forces continued with abuses on a large scale for months afterwards, which included the destruction of Serb property. Also, Serbs still face significant barriers to employment and to regain their property. Consequently, today Serbs constitute 3.2% of Croatian population, down from the prewar population of 12%. The majority of the remaining population is elderly, which indicates that the negative demographic trend will persist.

Currently, the official status of "autochthonous ethnic minority" for the Serbs of Croatia is recognized by the Croatian Constitutional Act on the Rights of National Minorities from 2002 which supplemented the Constitutional Act on the Human Rights and Freedoms and on the Rights of Ethnic and National Communities or Minorities in the Republic of Croatia from 1992.

=== Contemporary period ===
Tension and violence between Serbs and Croats has reduced since 2000 and has remained low to this day, however, significant problems remain. The main issue is thought to be due to high-level official and social discrimination against the Serbs. In 2005, Croatia ratified a bilateral agreement with Serbia and Montenegro on the protection of the Serb and Montenegrin minority in Croatia and the Croatian ethnic minority in Serbia and Montenegro. Some Croats, including politicians, continue to deny and minimise the magnitude of the genocide perpetrated against Serbs in the Independent State of Croatia. At the highest levels of the Croatian government, new laws are continuously introduced to combat this discrimination, demonstrating an effort on the part of the government. For example, lengthy and in some cases unfair proceedings, particularly in lower-level courts, remain a major problem for Serbian returnees pursuing their rights in court. In addition, Serbs continue to be discriminated against in access to employment and in realizing other economic and social rights. Also some cases of violence and harassment against Croatian Serbs continue to be reported.

The property laws allegedly favour Bosnian Croats refugees who took residence in houses that were left unoccupied and unguarded by Serbs after Operation Storm. The Amnesty International's 2005 report considers one of the greatest obstacles to the return of thousands of Croatian Serbs has been the failure of the Croatian authorities to provide adequate housing solutions to Croatian Serbs who were stripped of their occupancy rights, including where possible by reinstating occupancy rights to those who had been affected by their discriminatory termination.

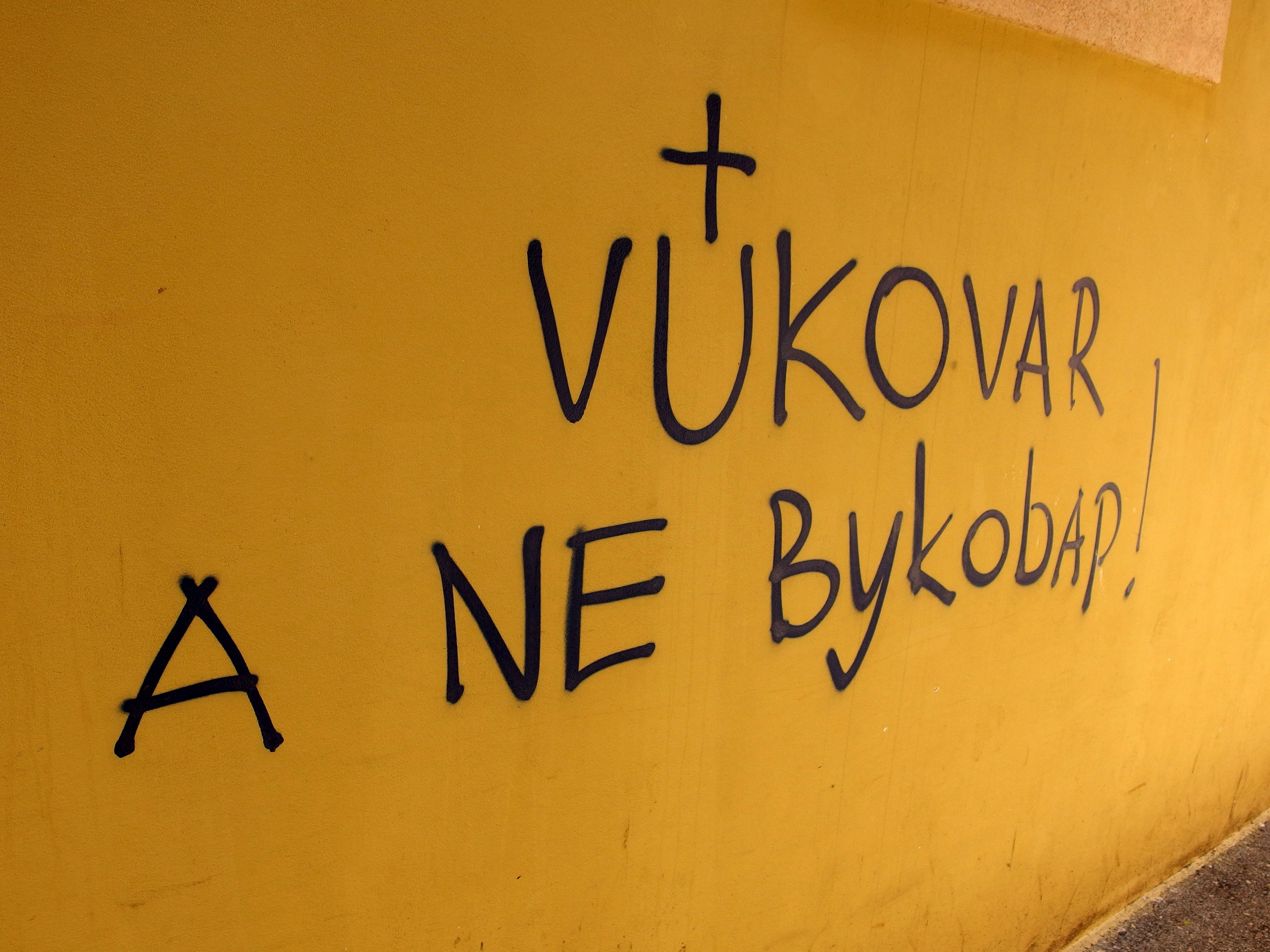
Graffiti during 2013 Anti-Cyrillic protests

The European Court of Human Rights decided against Croatian Serb Kristina Blečić and stripped her of occupancy rights after leaving her house in 1991 in Zadar. In 2009, the UN Human Rights Committee found a wartime termination of occupancy rights of a Serbian family to violate International Covenant on Civil and Political Rights. In 2010, the European Committee on Social Rights found the treatment of Serbs in Croatia in respect of housing to be discriminatory and too slow, thus in violation of Croatia's obligations under the European Social Charter. In 2013, the Anti-Cyrillic protests were a series of protests in late 2013 against the application of bilingualism in Vukovar, whereby Serbian and the Serbian Cyrillic alphabet were assigned co-official status due to the local minority population.

In 2015, the Amnesty International reported that Croatian Serbs continued to face discrimination in public sector employment and the restitution of tenancy rights to social housing vacated during the war. In 2017 they again pointed out that Serbs faced significant barriers to employment and obstacles to regain their property. Amnesty International also said that the right to use minority languages and scripts continued to be politicized and unimplemented in some towns and that heightened nationalist rhetoric and hate speech contributed to growing ethnic intolerance and insecurity.

Since 2016, anti-fascist groups, leaders of Croatia's Serb, Roma, and Jewish communities and former top Croat officials have boycotted the official state commemoration for the victims of the Jasenovac concentration camp because, as they said, Croatian authorities refused to denounce the Ustaše legacy explicitly and they downplayed and revitalized crimes committed by Ustashe.

Following the 2020 Croatian parliamentary election, Boris Milošević, member of the Independent Democratic Serb Party and President of the Serb National Council, was elected one of the four Deputy Prime Ministers of Croatia in charge of social affairs and human and minority rights in the cabinet of Andrej Plenković. On the 25th anniversary of the Operation Storm, the celebrations were attended for the first time ever by an ethnic Serb political representative, Boris Milošević. In 2020, Zoran Milanović (President of Croatia), Tomo Medved (Minister of Croatian Veterans), along with members of the Independent Democratic Serb Party, Milorad Pupovac and Deputy Prime Minister Milošević, attended a commemoration of the Grubori massacre, the mass murder of elderly Serbs civilians.

== Demographics ==
According to data from the 2021 census, the population of ethnic Serbs in Croatia is 123,892, constituting 3.2% of the total population; they are the second-largest ethnic group in the country (after Croats) and the largest ethnic minority group.

Year	Population	Share
1900	548,302	17.3%
1910	564,214	16.6%
1921	584,058	16.9%
1931	636,518	16.8%
1948	543,795	14.4%
1953	588,411	15%
1961	624,956	15%
1971	626,789	14.1%
1981	531,502	11.5%
1991	581,663	12.1%
2001	201,631	4.5%
2011	186,633	4.3%
2021	123,892	3.2%

Following the Croatian War of Independence, the Serb population fell by more than three-quarters: the 1991 pre-war census had recorded 581,663 Serbs, representing 12.2% of the country’s total population. The drastic decline resulted from two main factors: wartime displacement and the subsequent process of assimilation, commonly referred to as Croatisation.

Around 250,000 Serbs became refugees during the war, fleeing Croatia. The vast majority of them settled in Serbia, while portion emigrated abroad, primarily overseas (United States, Canada, and Australia).

In post-war Croatia, the Serb minority has undergone a process of Croatisation, driven primarily by subtle yet pervasive socio-cultural pressures. A key factor is the widespread social stigmatization of Serbs, rooted in the prevailing narrative of the Croatian War of Independence that casts them collectively as aggressors or enemies. This perspective is consistently reinforced through education, media, and public discourse. School curricula typically present the conflict as a defensive Croatian victory against Serbian expansionism, often downplaying or omitting the suffering of Serb civilians, which deepens alienation among younger generations. In daily life, these attitudes translate into significant peer pressure on Serb children, many of whom are encouraged, or feel compelled, to conceal their ethnicity. Parents frequently register their children as Croats on official school documents to shield them from bullying, and incidents of harassment linked to Serbian names. Low rates of intermarriage, when it does occur, tend to result in children identifying as Croat.

Serbs of Croatia predominately (81.7%) belong to the Eastern Orthodoxy and are adherents of the Serbian Orthodox Church. Seven dioceses of the Serbian Orthodox Church have jurisdiction over the territory of Croatia: one metropolitanate (Metropolitanate of Zagreb and Ljubljana) and six eparchies (Eparchy of Gornji Karlovac, Eparchy of Slavonia, Eparchy of Osijek Plain and Baranya, Eparchy of Srem, Eparchy of Dalmatia, and Eparchy of Zachlumia, Herzegovina, and the Littoral). A smaller portion of ethnic Serbs reported other religious affiliations: 1.6% identified as Catholic, 1.6% as members of other Christian denominations, 9% as atheists or non-religious, and 1.9% as agnostics.

Despite Serbs numbering 123,892 people only 45,004 (1.1% of total population) declared Serbian as their mother tongue. The Serbian language is in official use in 26 cities and municipalities across the country.

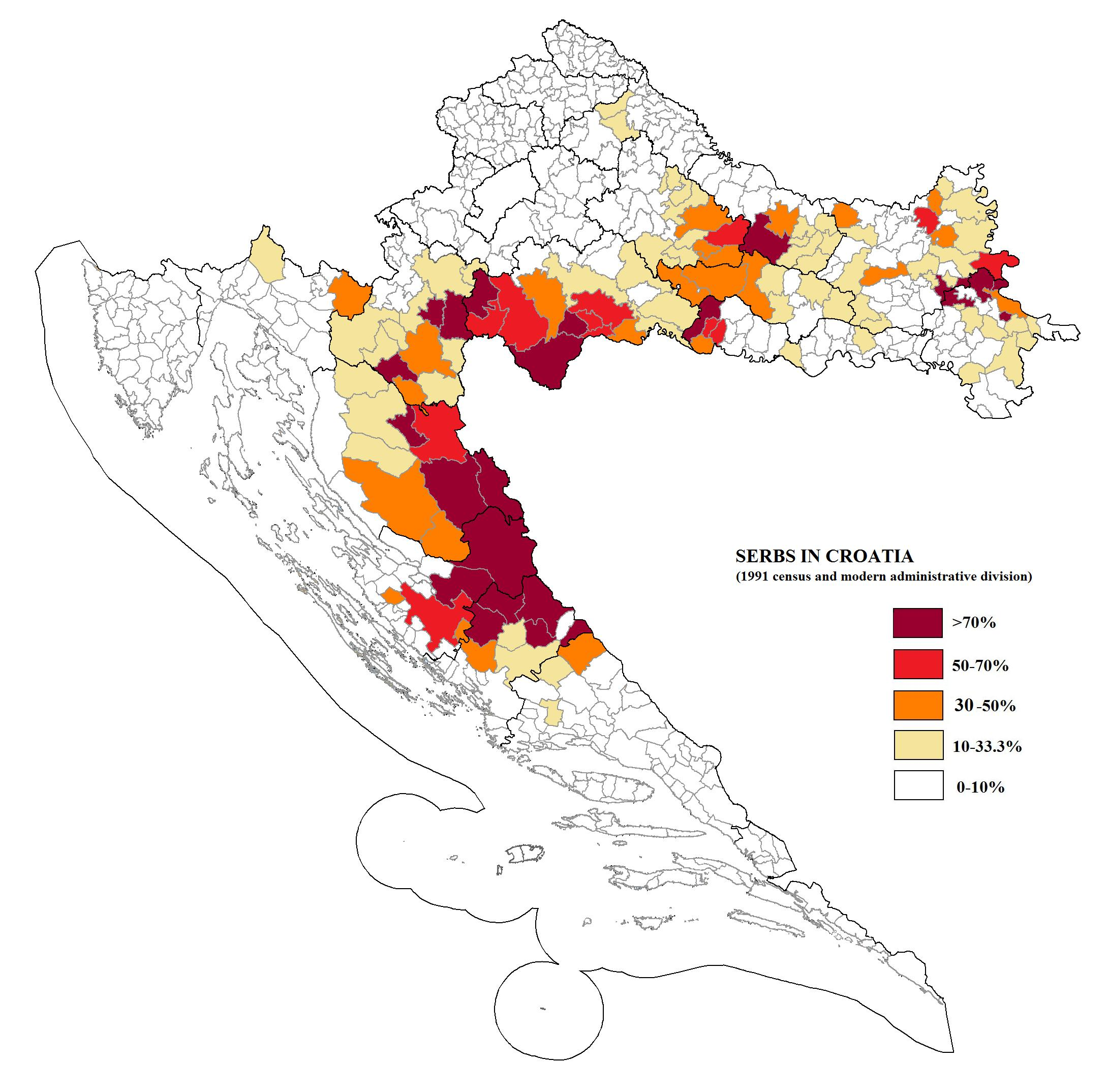
Share by cities and municipalities, 1991

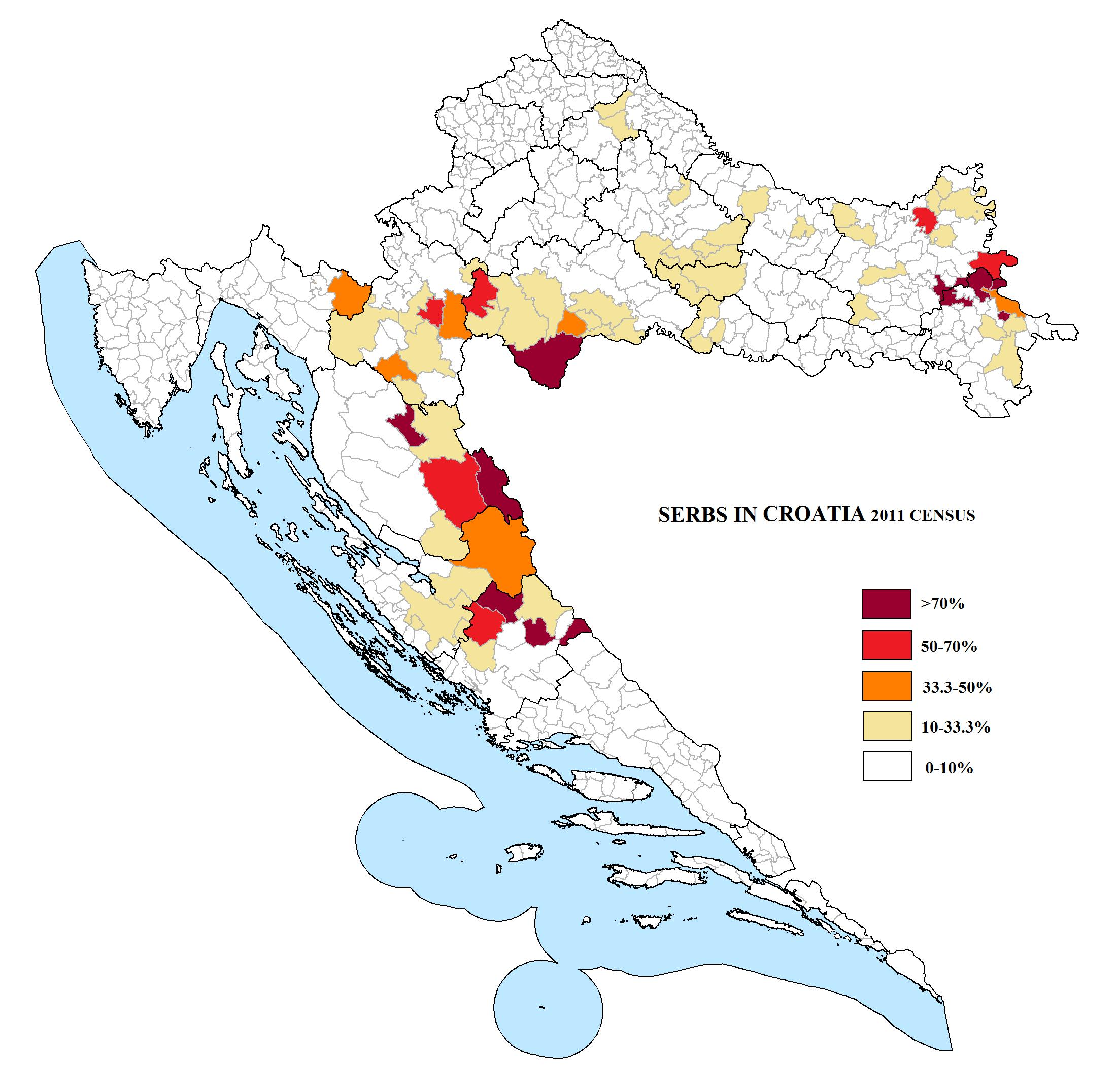
Share by cities and municipalities, 2011

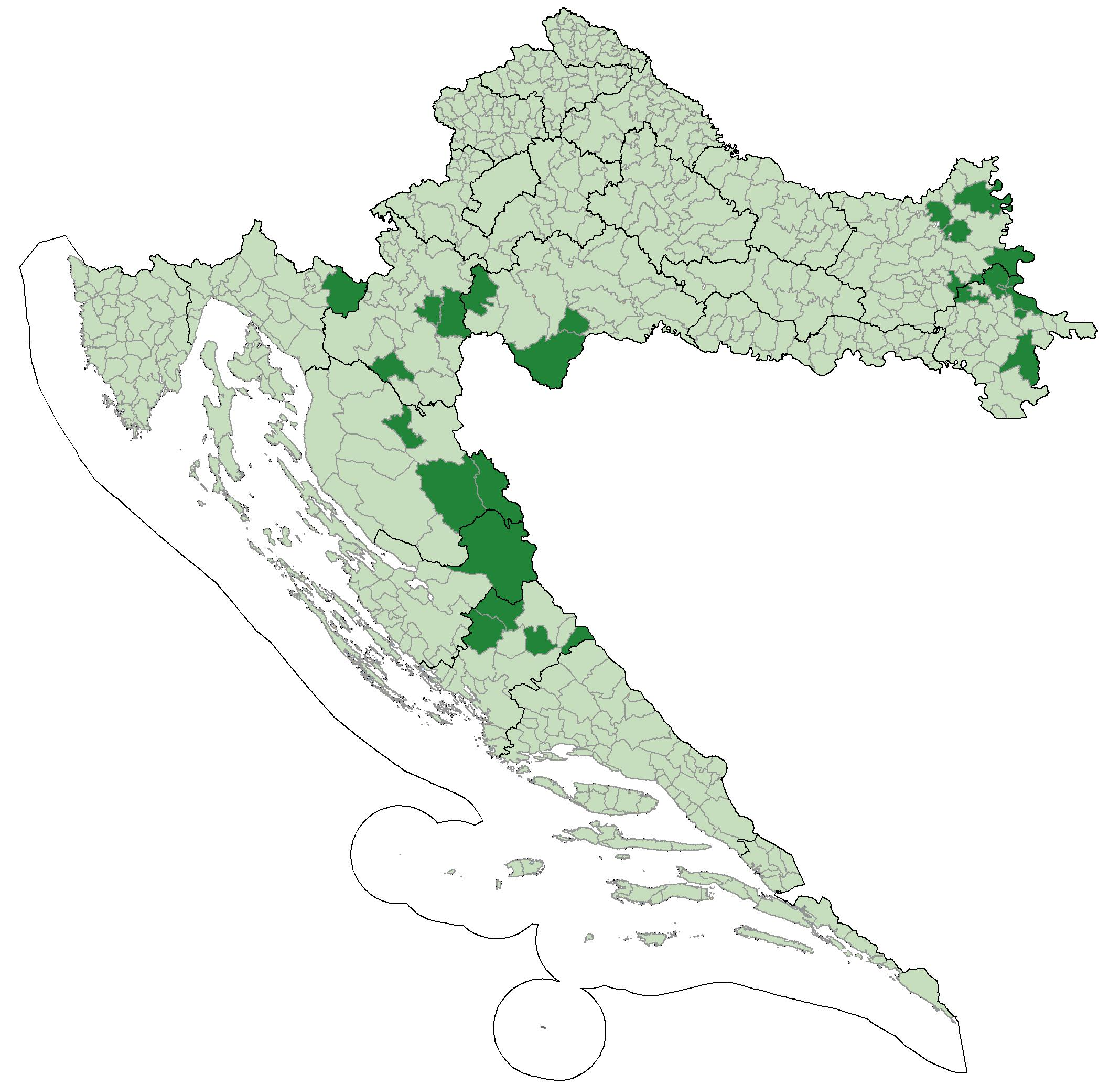
Cities and municipalities where Serbian language is in official use

=== Counties ===
Counties with share of ethnic Serbs above national average:

- Vukovar-Srijem (19,309 or 13.5%)
- Lika-Senj (4,062 or 9.5%)
- Sisak-Moslavina (12,153 or 8.7%)
- Šibenik-Knin (8,064 or 8.3%)
- Karlovac (8,683 or 7.7%)
- Osijek-Baranja (15,486 or 6%)

=== Cities ===
Cities with significant share of ethnic Serbs (10% or more):

- Vrbovsko (1,255 or 32.4%)
- Obrovac (1,082 or 31.3%)
- Vukovar (6,890 or 29.7%)
- Hrvatska Kostajnica (428 or 22.8%)
- Knin (2,492 or 21.4%)
- Glina (1,462 or 20.5%)
- Beli Manastir (1,605 or 20.1%)
- Skradin (605 or 18%)
- Ogulin (1,841 or 15%)
- Benkovac (1,315 or 13.6%)
- Pakrac (801 or 11.3%)
- Lipik (540 or 10.5%)

Large cities with share of ethnic Serbs above national average:

- Karlovac (2,840 or 5.7%)
- Rijeka (5,537 or 5.1%)
- Pula (2,661 or 5.1%)
- Sisak (1,867 or 4.6%)
- Osijek (4,188 or 4.3%)

=== Municipalities ===
Municipalities with a significant share of ethnic Serbs (10% or more):

- Ervenik (765 or 96.9%)
- Negoslavci (952 or 96.8%)
- Borovo (3,224 or 90.7%)
- Markušica (1,600 or 90.2%)
- Trpinja (3,659 or 87.8%)
- Biskupija (964 or 81.9%)
- Donji Lapac (1,082 or 79.2%)
- Šodolovci (950 or 78%)
- Civljane (126 or 73.7%)
- Dvor 2,015 or 67.2%)
- Jagodnjak (943 or 62.8%)
- Gvozd (1,282 or 62.6%)
- Krnjak (773 or 58%)
- Erdut (2,908 or 53.7%)
- Kistanje (1,375 or 51.9%)
- Vrhovine (311 or 47.6%)
- Gračac (1,360 or 43.3%)
- Udbina (569 or 42.6%)
- Plaški (656 or 39.7%)
- Vojnić (1,385 or 38.4%)
- Donji Kukuruzari (337 or 31.2%)
- Topusko (556 or 25%)
- Plitvička Jezera (838 or 23%)
- Darda (1,090 or 20.1%)
- Majur (150 or 19.7%)
- Saborsko (88 or 18.9%)
- Stari Jankovci (612 or 18.7%)
- Sunja (700 or 17%)
- Kneževi Vinogradi (554 or 16.5%)
- Hrvatska Dubica (240 or 16.4%)
- Popovac (235 or 16.2%)
- Okučani (371 or 16%)
- Lovinac (142 or 15%)
- Rasinja (392 or 14.9%)
- Viljevo (227 or 13.9%)
- Levanjska Varoš (95 or 12.4%)
- Podgorač (296 or 12%)
- Stara Gradiška (104 or 11.4%)
- Sokolovac (312 or 11.2%)
- Dežanovac (217 or 11%)
- Sirač (188 or 10.4%)
- Lišane Ostrovičke (60 or 10.1%)

== Politics ==
The Serb National Council is a state level elected representation body of Serbs, established for the protection of the rights and the minority self-government of Serbs in Croatia. The Joint Council of Municipalities is an elected sui generis organisation of cultural self-government for seven municipalities with an ethnic Serb majority in eastern Croatia (eastern Slavonia, western Syrmia and Baranya regions).

Numerous counties, cities and municipalities in Croatia elect national minorities councils or representatives tasked to advise local authorities on various minority specific issues and needs. The most recent national minorities councils elections took place in 2023. In addition, during the local elections Serbs in Croatia are guaranteed proportional representation and deputy-mayor or deputy-prefects positions in numerous countries, cities and municipalities. Where such a representation is not ensured via direct elections additional elections for national minorities representatives are held with the most recent one taking place in 2025.

At the parliamentary elections, Croatian citizens who belong to one of the recognized ethnic minorities in Croatia are free to choose whether to vote in one of the ten geographical electoral districts based on their place of residence or in Electoral district XII for ethnic minorities, covering all of Croatia. As a recognized ethnic minority, Serbs elect no less than three members of Croatian Parliament within the Electoral district XII. Ethnic Serb members of parliament are also often elected on non-ethnic parties lists in geographical electoral districts.

A significant majority of Serbs in Croatia vote in one of the ten geographical electoral districts where a disproportionately high share of them vote for the Social Democratic Party of Croatia.

The centre-left to big tent ethnic Independent Democratic Serb Party is the dominant party focused primarily on representing interests of Serbs in Croatia, which has historically won all Serb-reserved seats elected in the Electoral District XII. Since 2003, the party has been a member of every ruling coalition, with its representatives serving as Deputy Prime Minister, among other high offices. Other post-Croatian War of Independence smaller Serb ethnic parties in Croatia include active Democratic Alliance of Serbs and historical Serb People's Party and Party of Danube Serbs.

Notable ethnic Serb politicians from Croatia include Milorad Pupovac, Boris Milošević, Vojislav Stanimirović and other SDSS politicians. In non-ethnic parties notable individuals include Biljana Borzan, Branko Grčić, Željko Jovanović and Milanka Opačić.

Election	Representative	Party	Term	Representative	Party	Term	Representative	Party	Term
1995	Milan Đukić	SNS	1995–2003	Veselin Pejnović	SNS	1995–2000	Milorad Pupovac	ASH	1995–2000
2000	Milan Đukić	SNS	1995–2003	not elected under the law					
2003	Vojislav Stanimirović	SDSS	2003–2015	Ratko Gajica	SDSS	2003–2011	Milorad Pupovac	SDSS	2003–
2007	Vojislav Stanimirović	SDSS	2003–2015	Ratko Gajica	SDSS	2003–2011	Milorad Pupovac	SDSS	2003–
2011	Vojislav Stanimirović	SDSS	2003–2015	Jovo Vuković	SDSS	2011–2015	Milorad Pupovac	SDSS	2003–
2015	Mile Horvat	SDSS	2015–2020	Mirko Rašković	SDSS	2015–2016	Milorad Pupovac	SDSS	2003–
2016	Mile Horvat	SDSS	2015–2020	Boris Milošević	SDSS	2016–2024	Milorad Pupovac	SDSS	2003–
2020	Dragana Jeckov	SDSS	2020–	Boris Milošević	SDSS	2016–2024	Milorad Pupovac	SDSS	2003–
2024	Dragana Jeckov	SDSS	2020–	Anja Šimpraga	SDSS	2024–	Milorad Pupovac	SDSS	2003–

== Culture ==
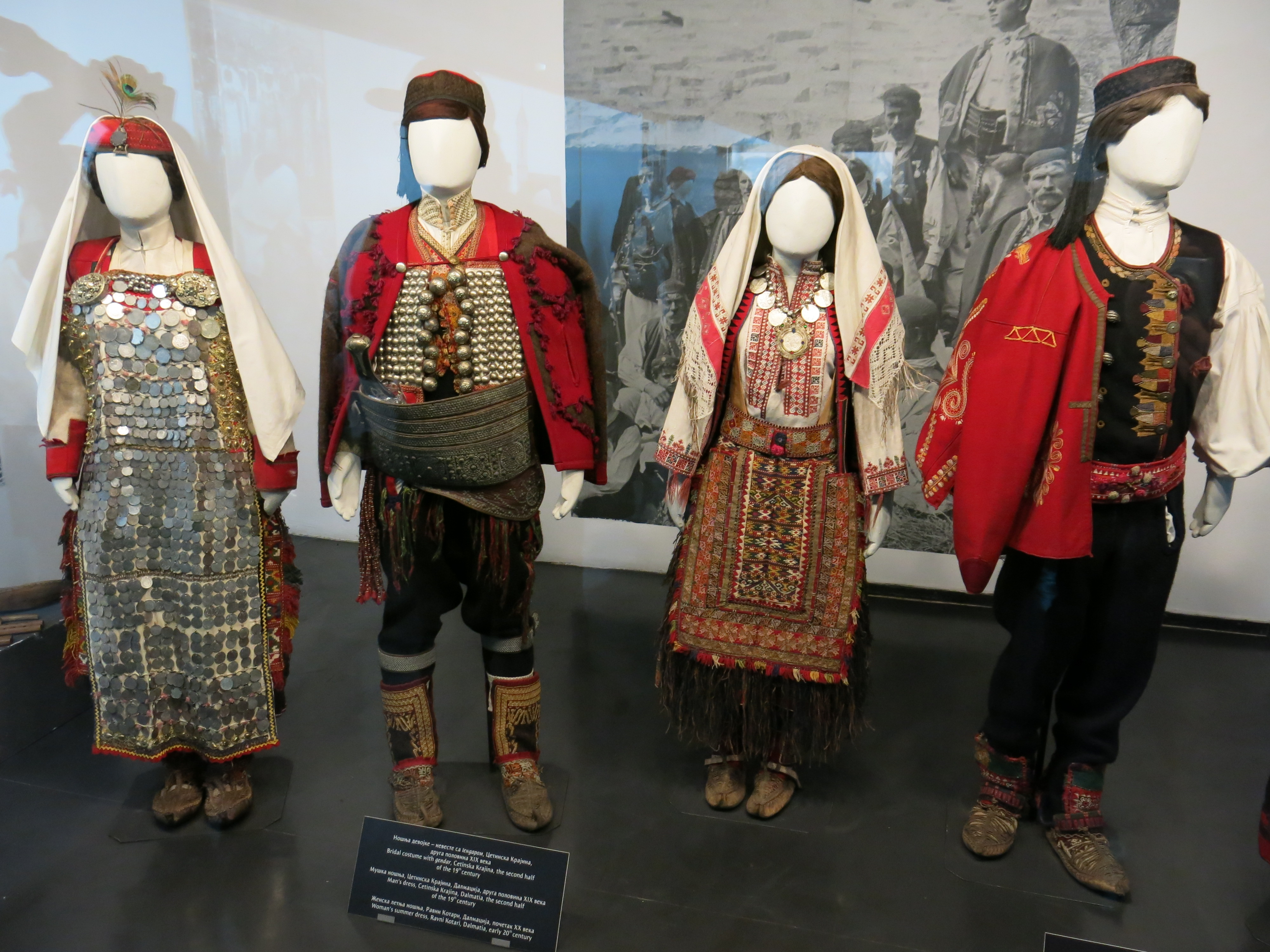
Serb traditional folk costumes from Dalmatia

Serbs of Croatia maintain a distinct identity rooted in Eastern Orthodox Christianity, with key cultural markers the celebration of Orthodox Christmas on January 7 and slava (the family patron saint feast). Notable traditions include gusle, diple, Ojkanje singing, and the Good Friday ritual of Čuvari Hristovog groba ("Guards of Christ’s Grave"), actively maintained by numerous folklore ensembles and choirs. The annual Days of Serbian Culture, organized since 2006, serve as the central nationwide manifestation showcasing performances, exhibitions, and lectures.

The main cultural organization of Serbs of Croatia remains the Serbian Cultural Society Prosvjeta, founded 1944 in Zagreb, with dozens of local subcommittees.

Many prominent Serbs from Croatia have gained international acclaim in their fields. Historically, Serbs have also left a lasting mark on broader Croatian culture: merchant Hristofor Stanković funded Zagreb’s first permanent theatre building in 1834, writers such as Vladan Desnica and the beloved children’s poet Grigor Vitez enriched literature; sculptor Vojin Bakić created iconic Yugoslav-era monuments; singer-songwriter Arsen Dedić and actor Rade Šerbedžija became symbols of Croatian performing arts, illustrating centuries of intertwined and mutually enriching Serbian and Croatian cultural space.

== Notable people ==
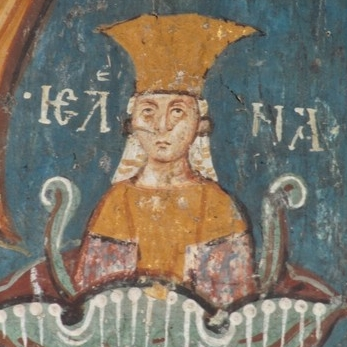
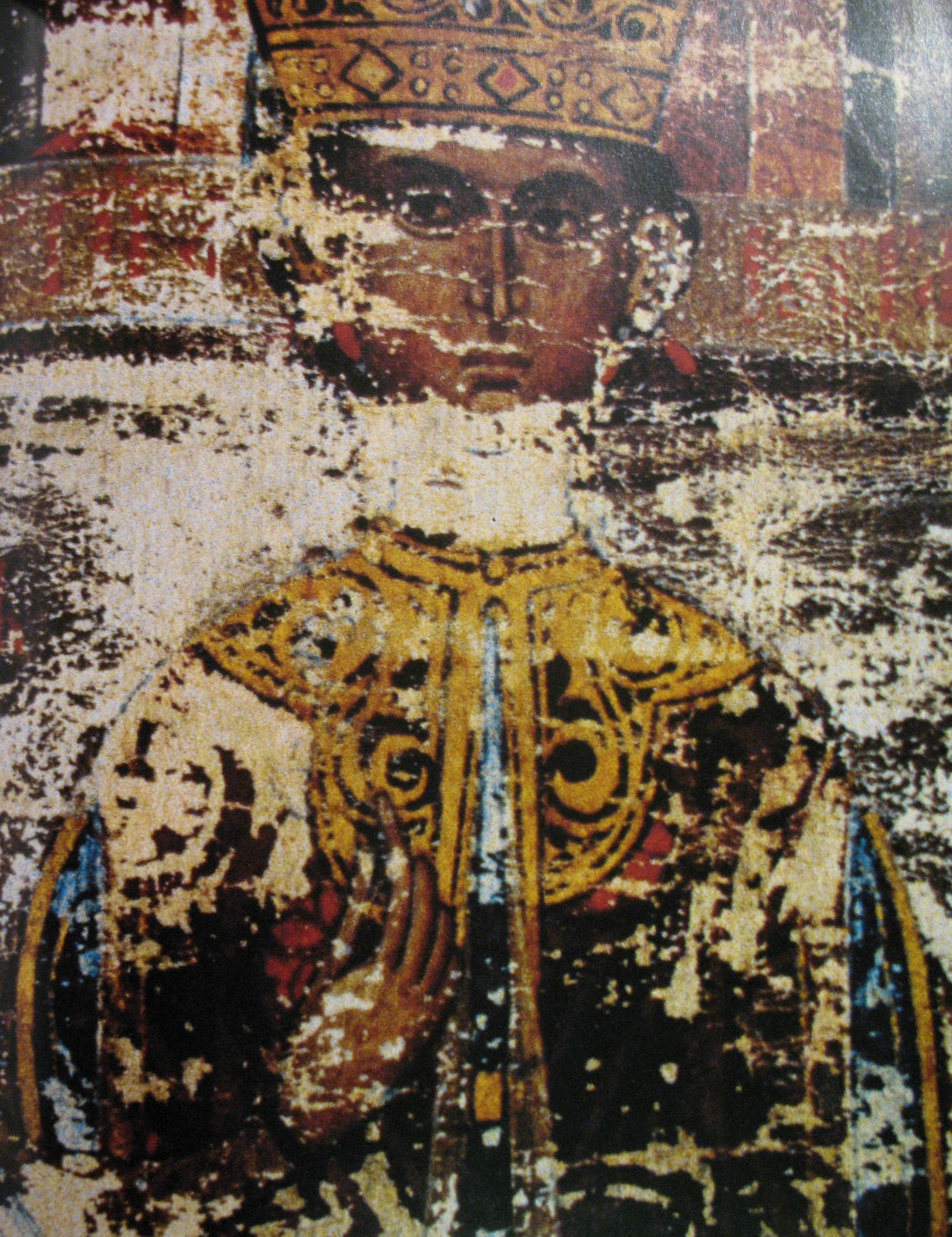
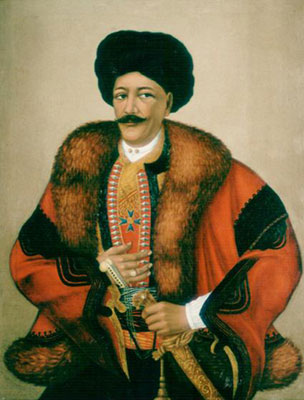
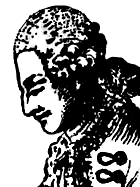
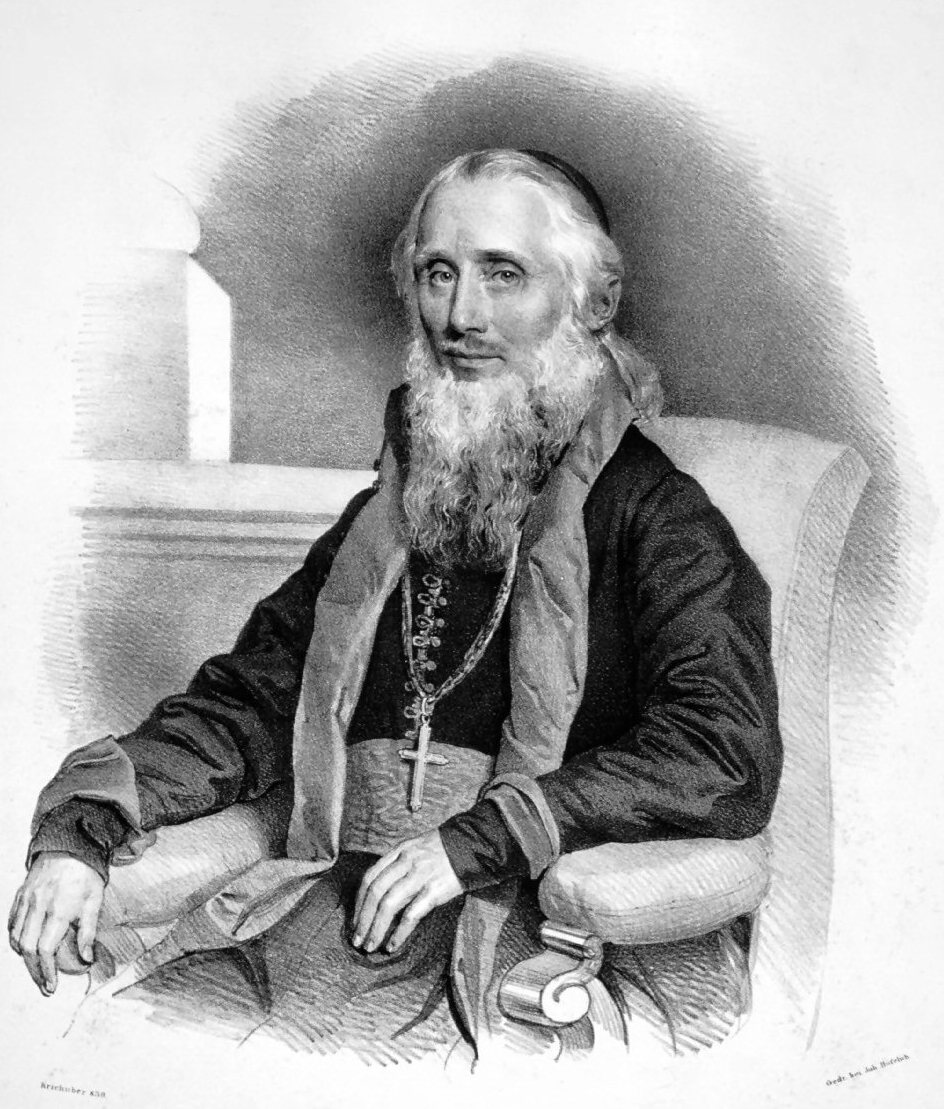
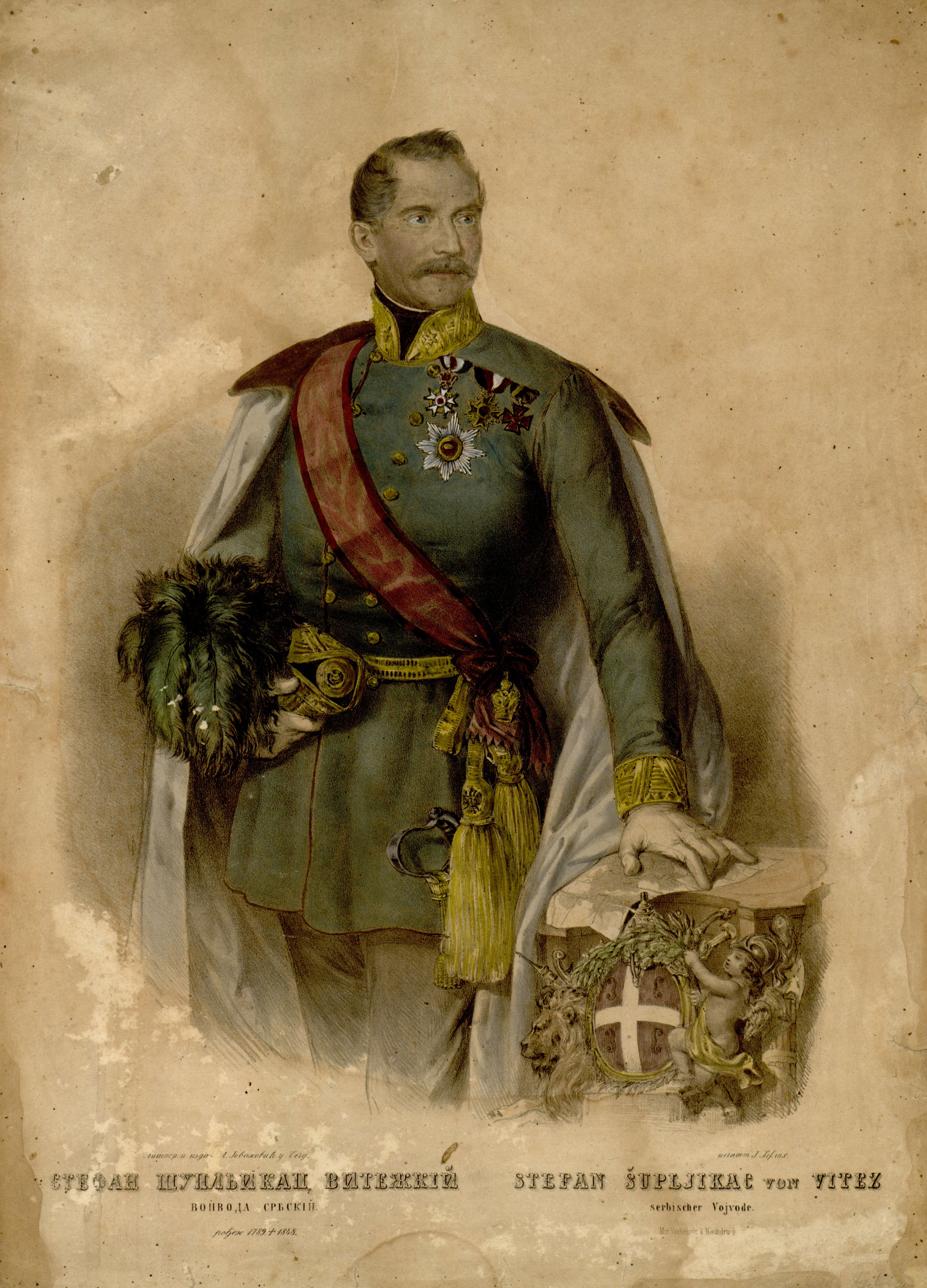
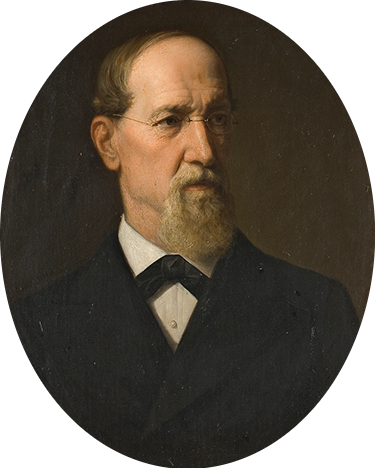
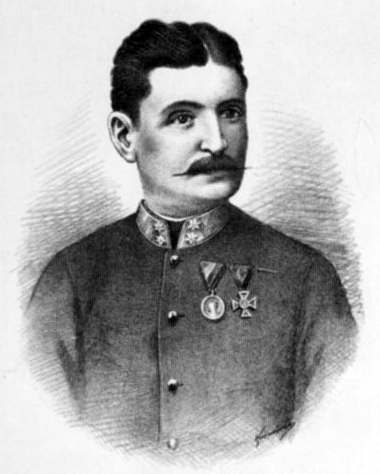
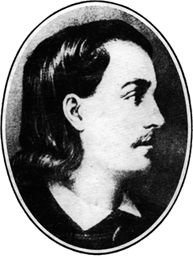
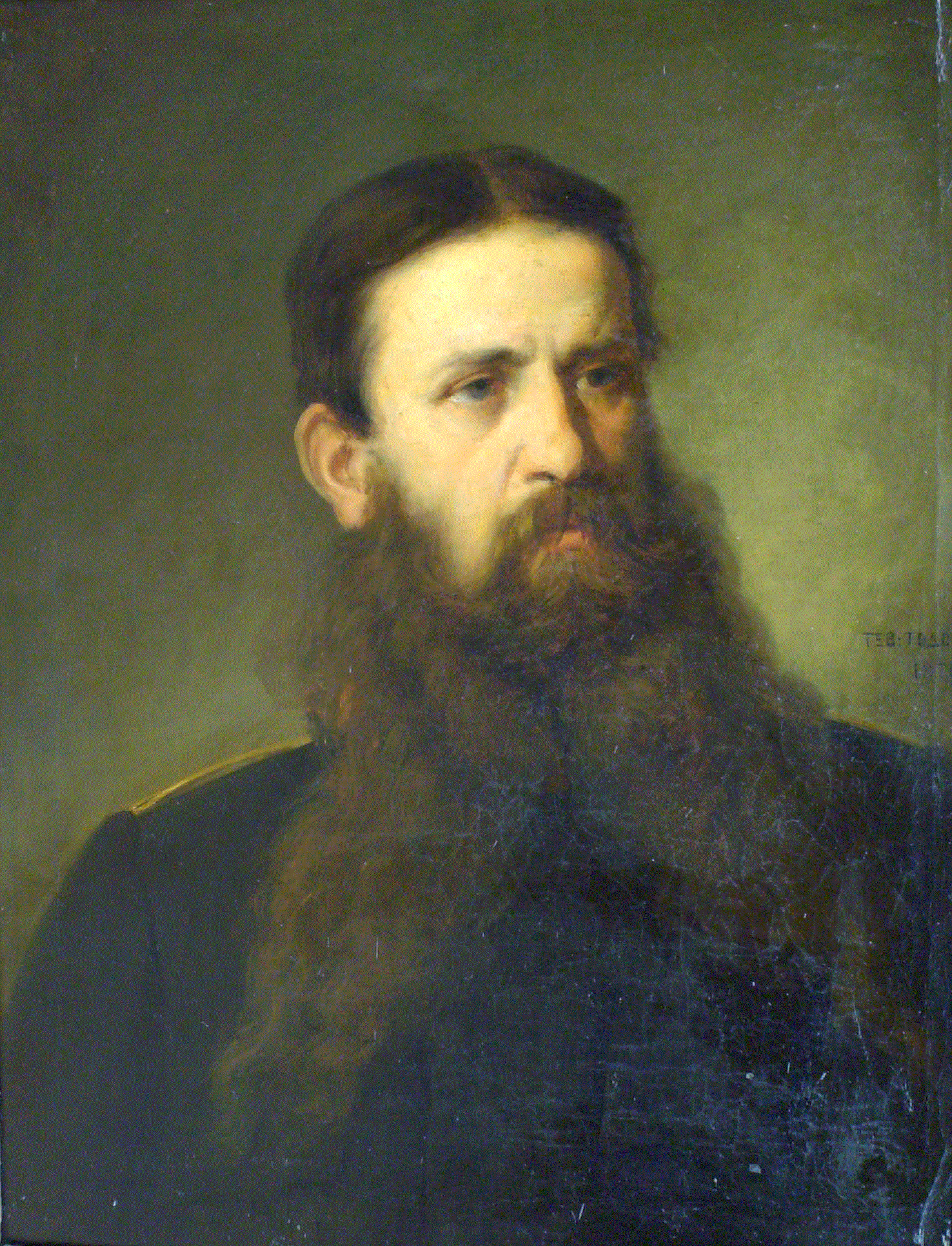
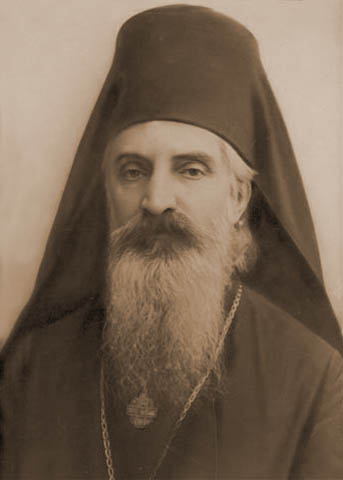
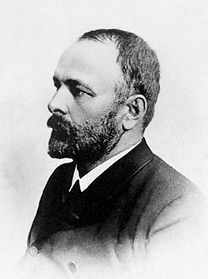
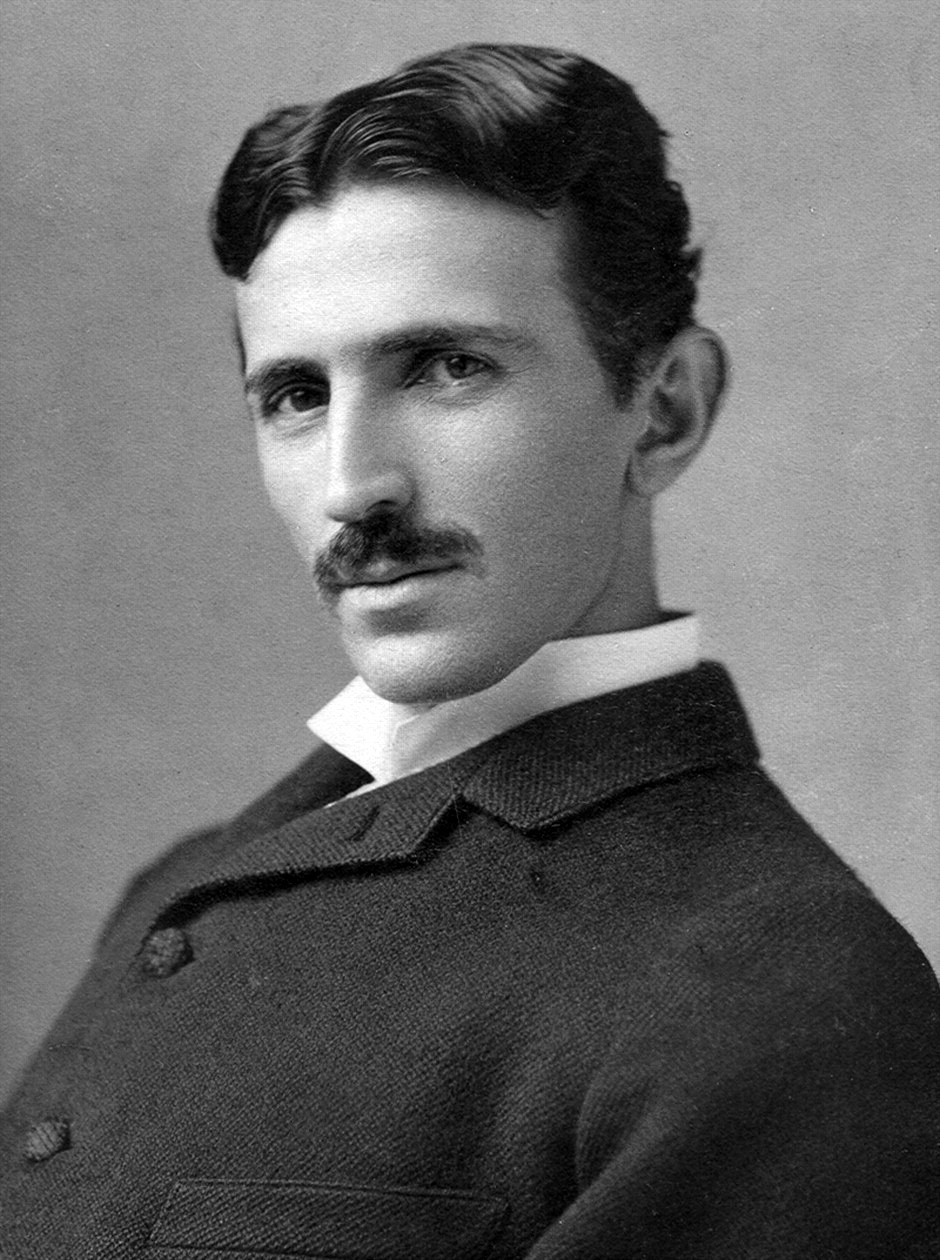
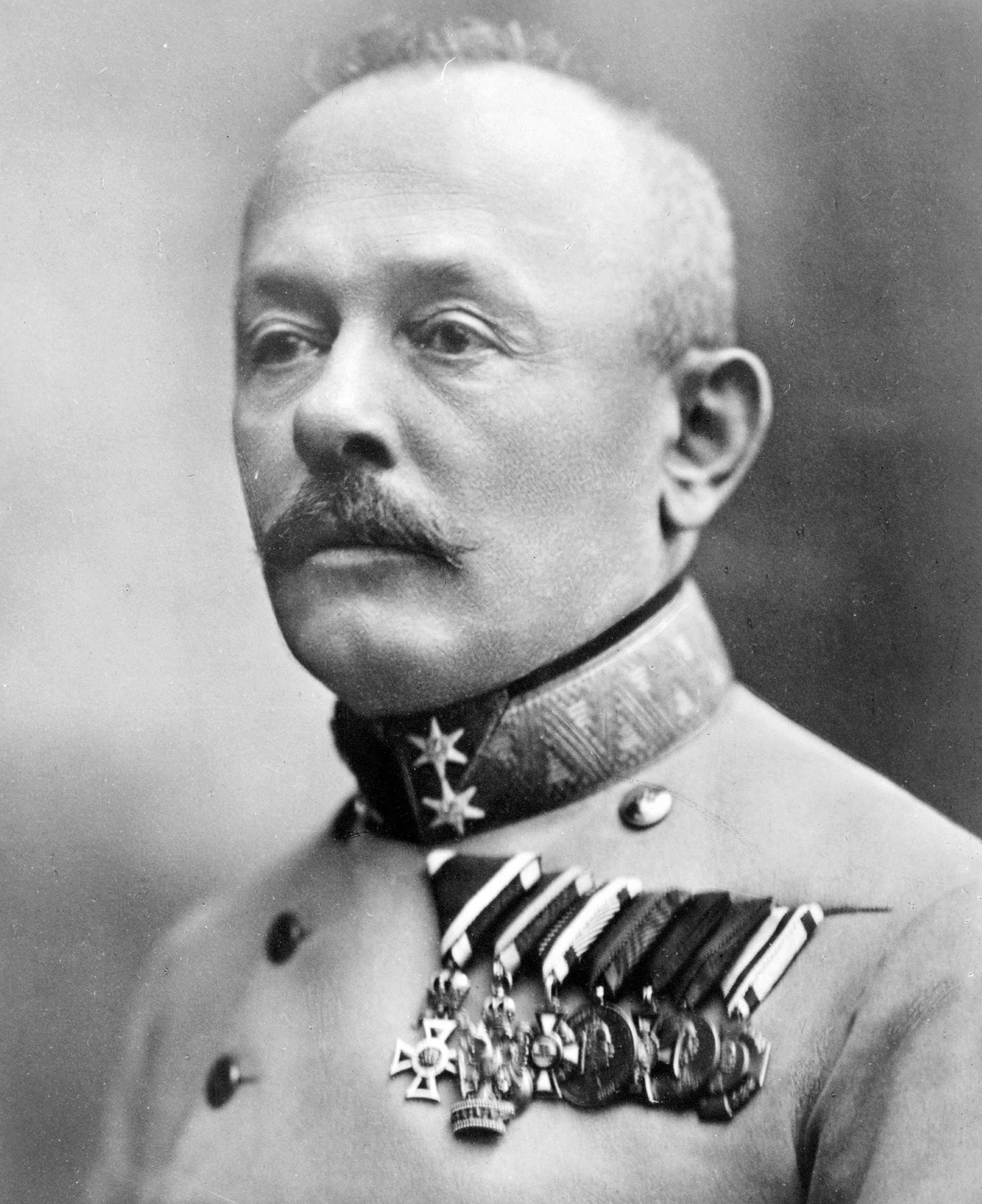
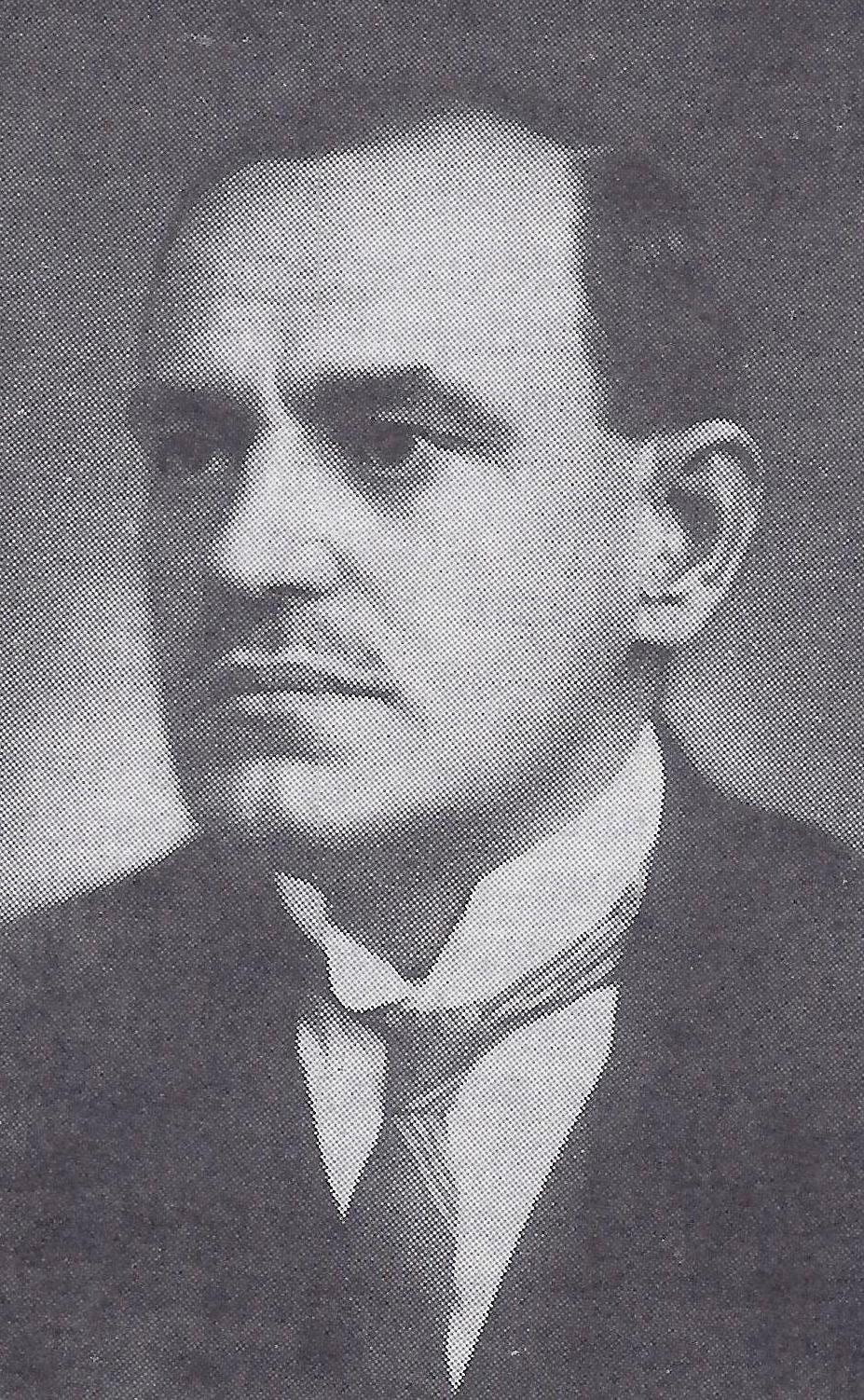
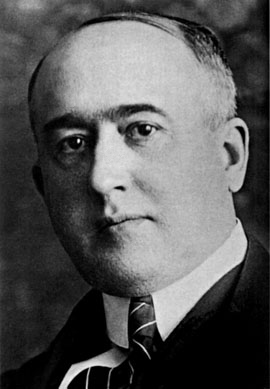
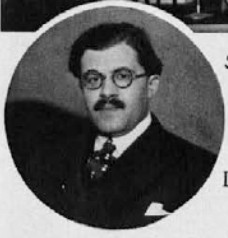
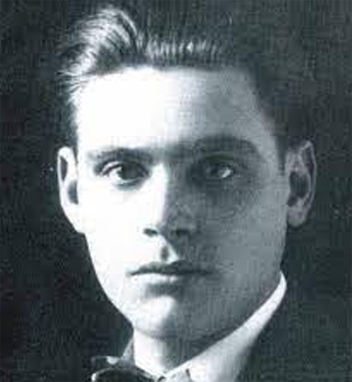
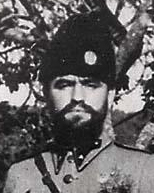
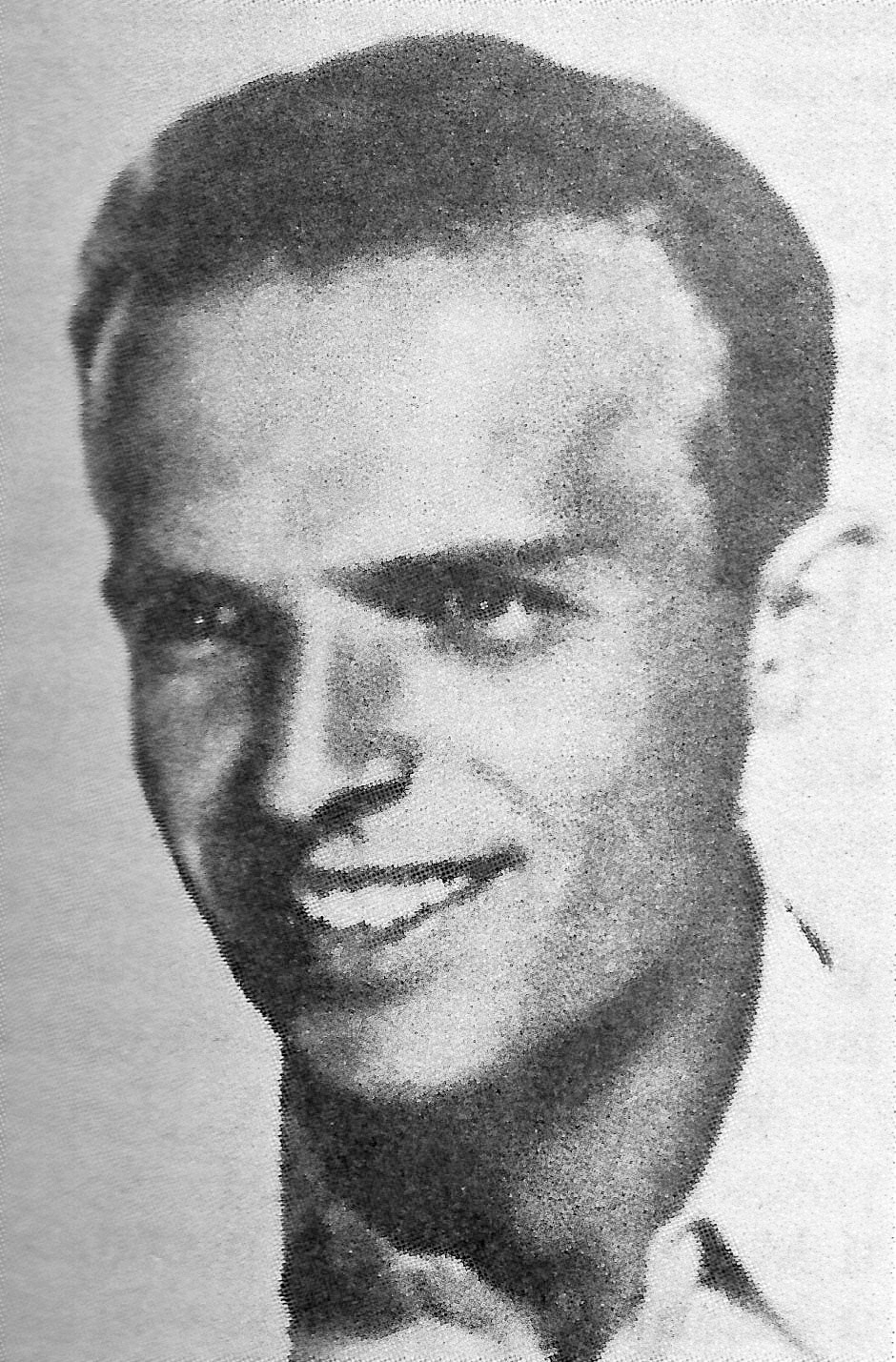
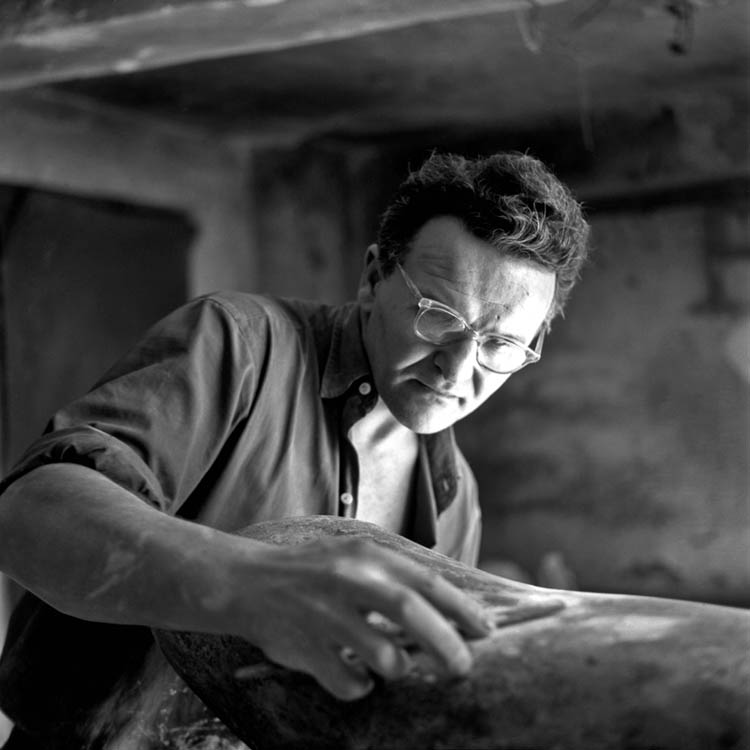
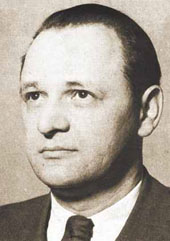
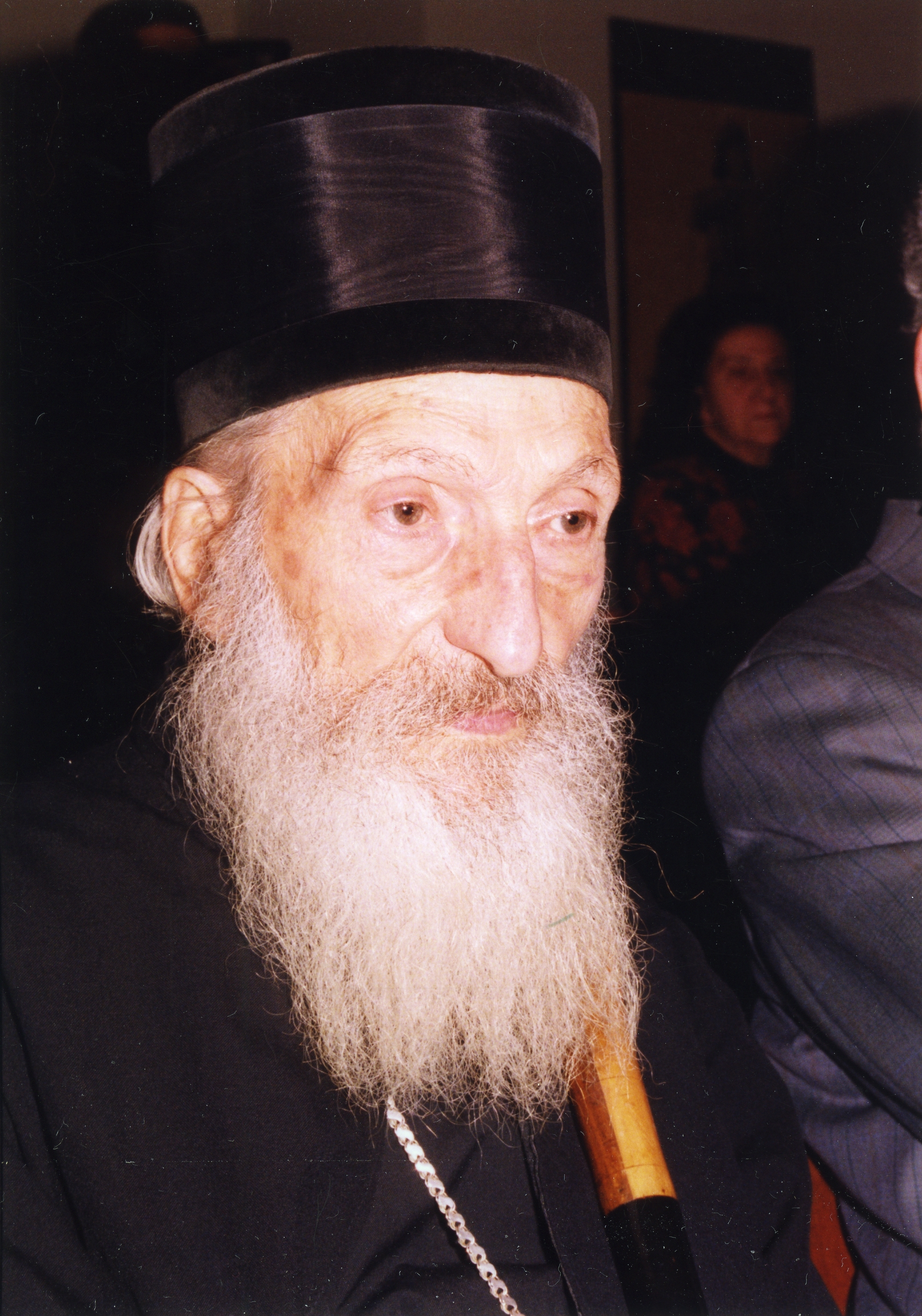
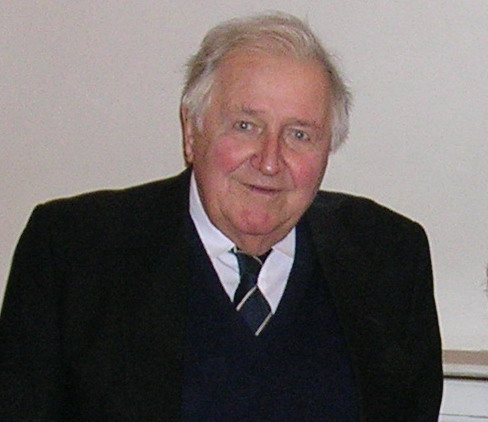
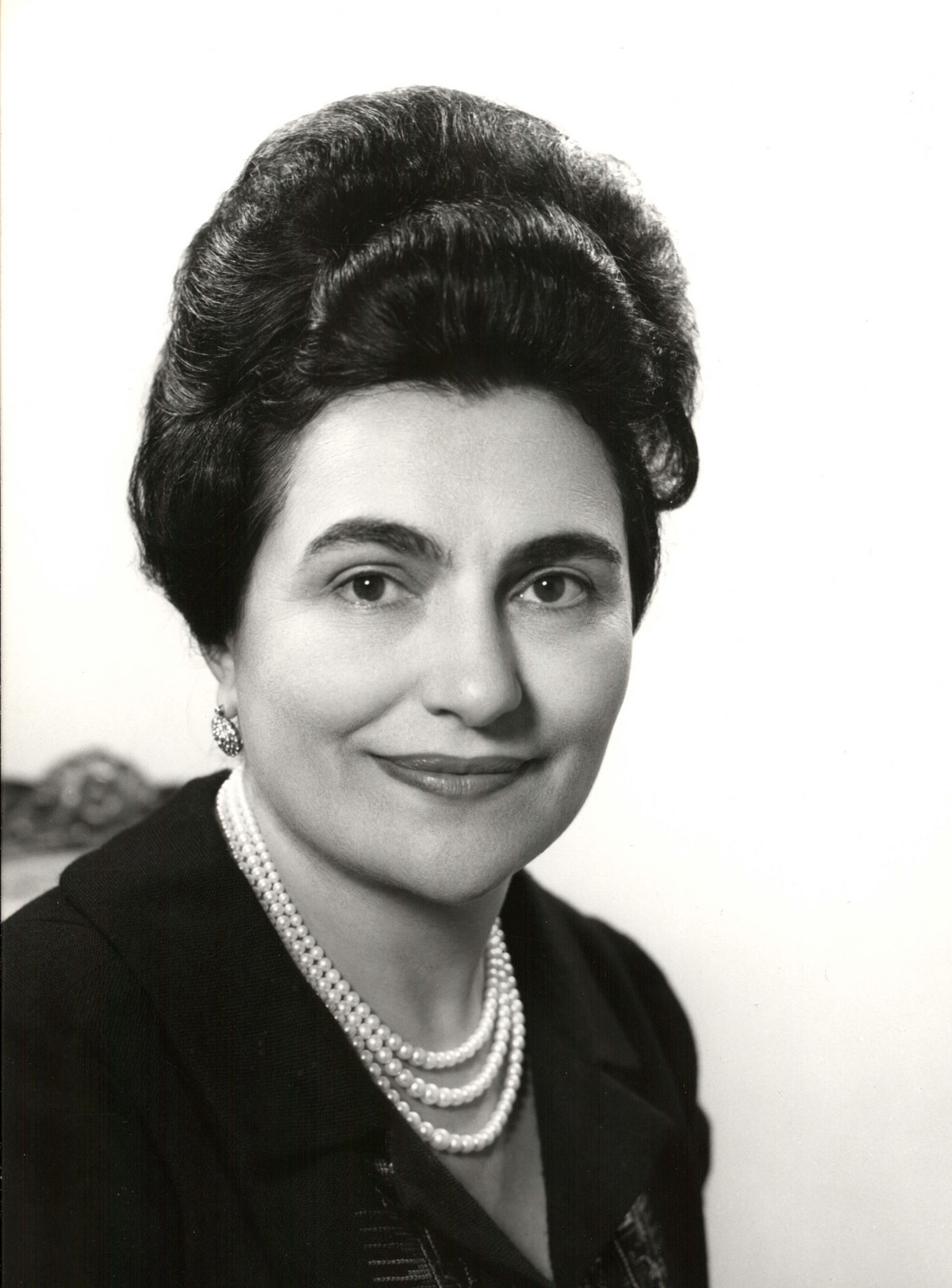
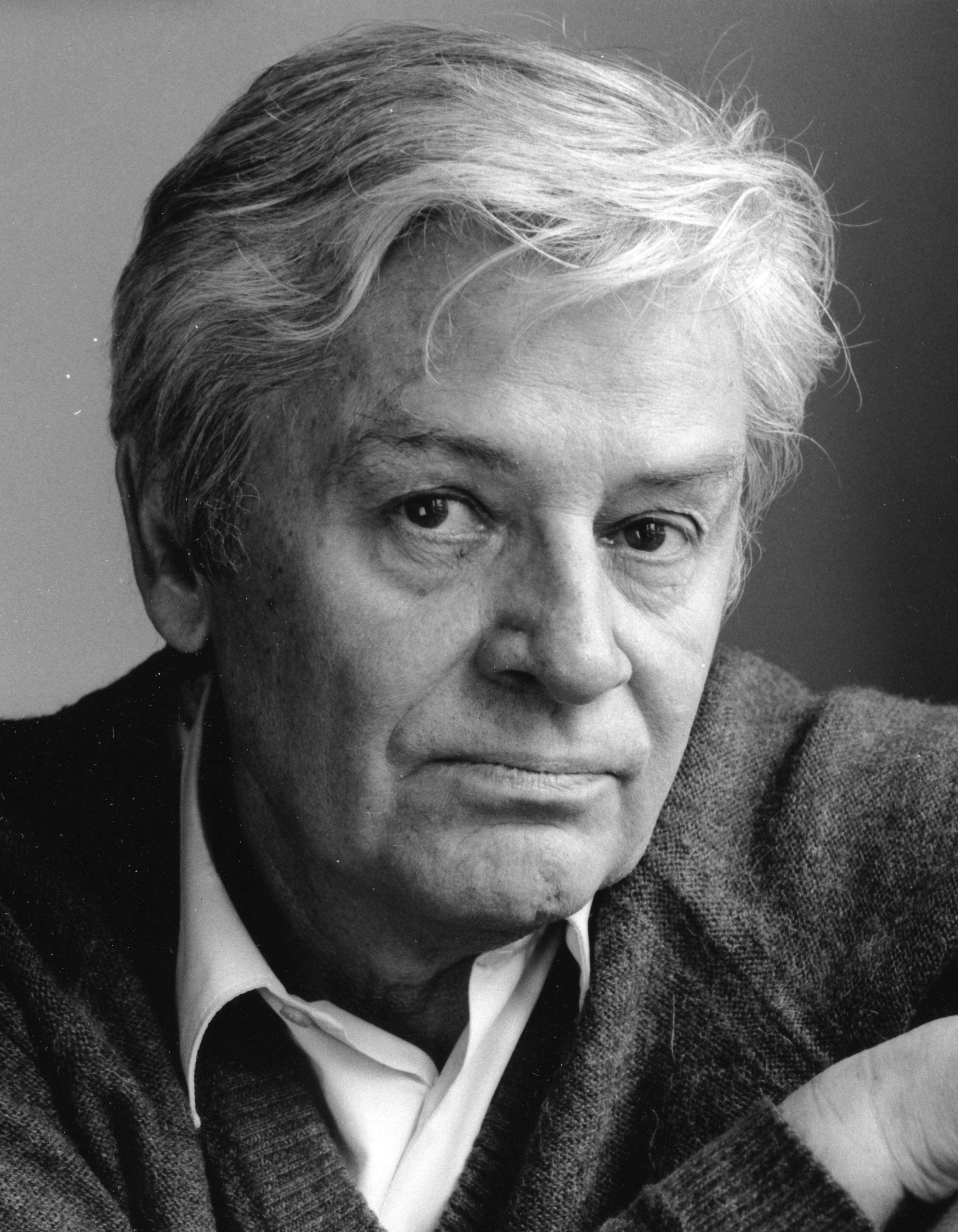
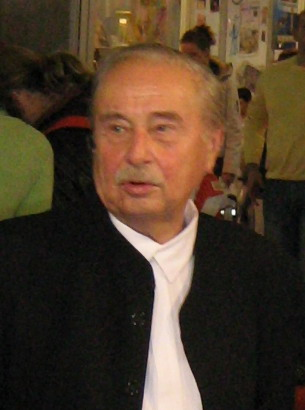
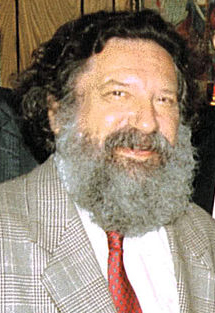
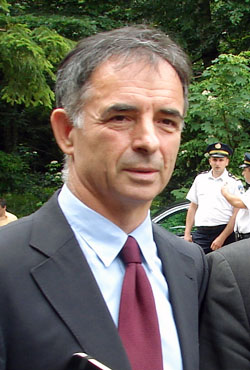
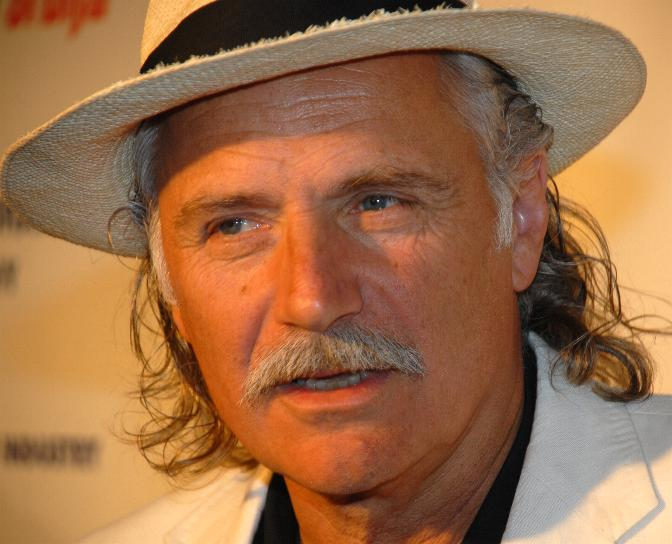
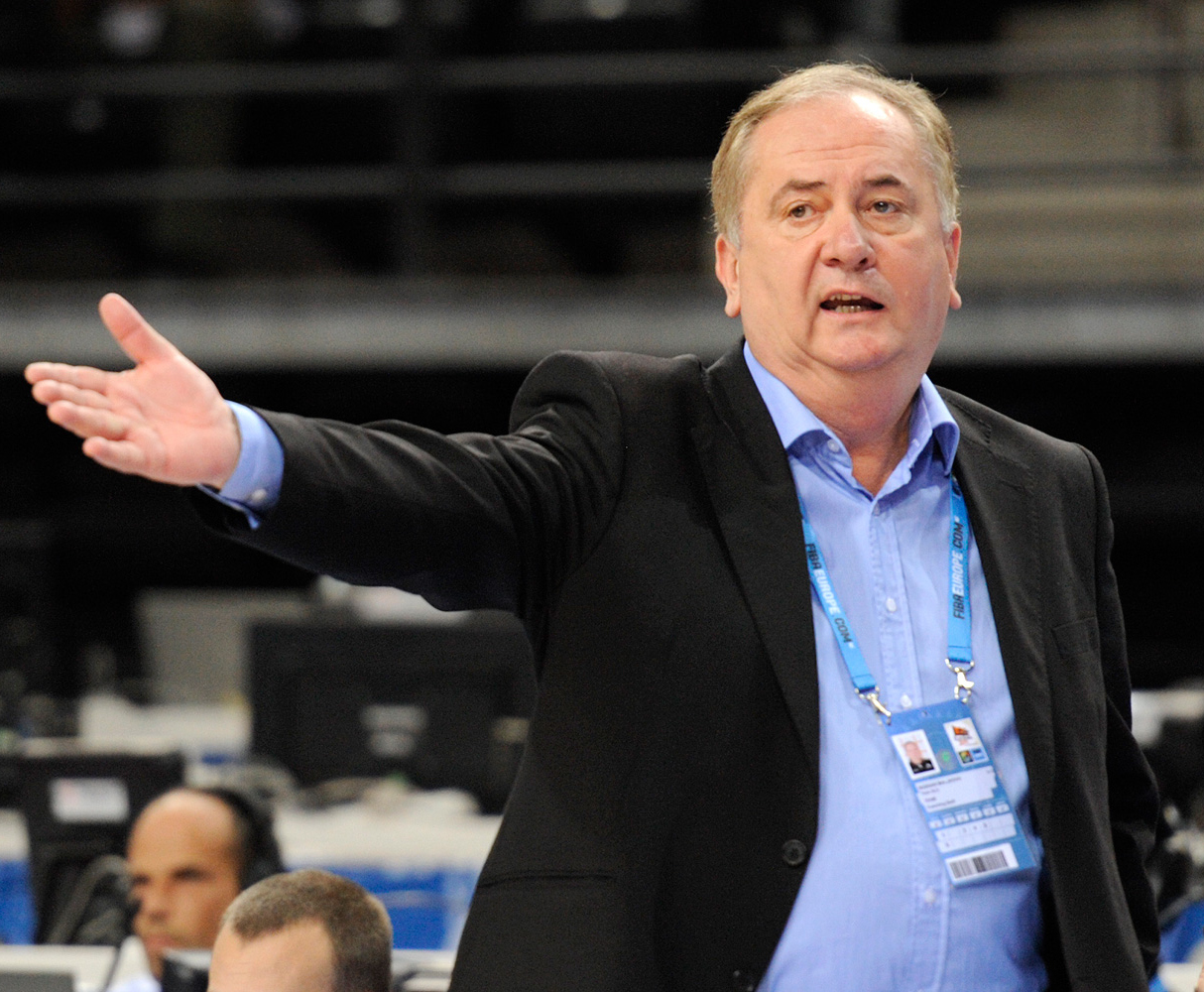
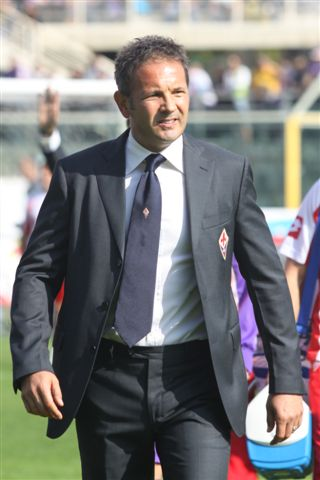
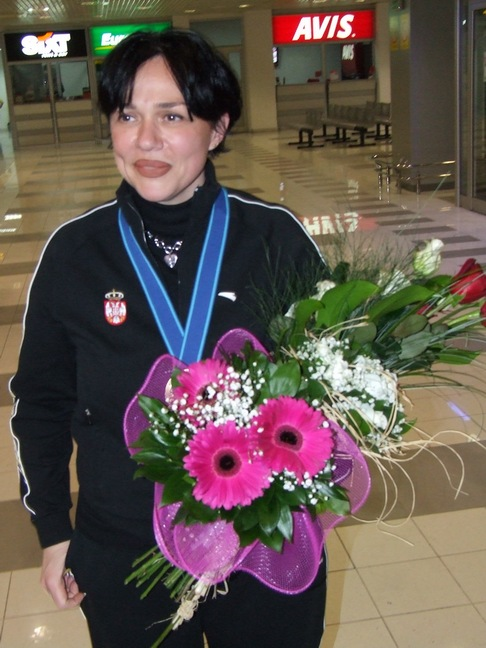
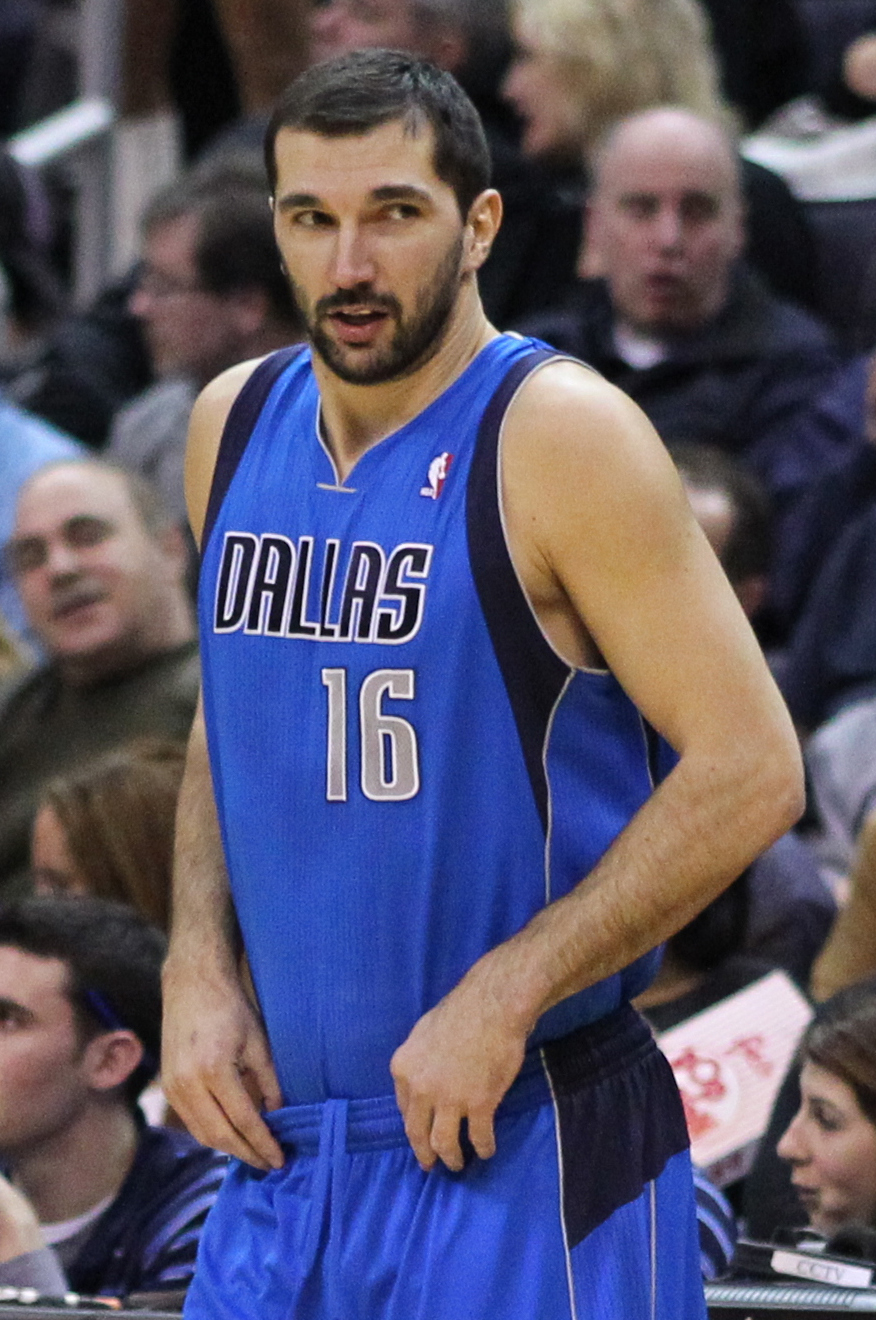
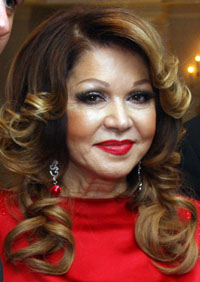
Jelena Nemanjić Šubić	Katarina Branković	Stojan Janković	Zaharije Orfelin	Josif Rajačić	Stevan Šupljikac	Matija Ban	Josif Runjanin	Branko Radičević
Đura Horvatović	Nikodim Milaš	Simo Matavulj	Nikola Tesla	Svetozar Boroević	Svetozar Pribićević	Milutin Milanković	Vladimir Velmar-Janković	Vladan Desnica
Momčilo Đujić	Rade Končar	Vojin Bakić	Grigor Vitez	Pavle	Dejan Medaković	Jovanka Broz	Slobodan Selenić	Milorad Pavić
Jovan Rašković	Milorad Pupovac	Arsen Dedić	Rade Šerbedžija	Božidar Maljković	Siniša Mihajlović	Jasna Šekarić	Peja Stojaković	Neda Ukraden

- Stojan Aralica – painter
- Milan Babić – president of the Republic of Serbian Krajina
- Lazar Bačić – merchant and philanthropist
- Vojin Bakić – sculptor
- Matija Ban – poet and playwright
- Milan Borjan – football player
- Svetozar Borojević – Austro-Hungarian field marshal
- Katarina Branković – medieval princess
- Jovanka Broz – First Lady of Yugoslavia
- Goran Bunjevčević – football player
- Borislav Cvetković – football player
- Zvjezdan Cvetković – football player
- Slavko Ćuruvija – journalist
- Arsen Dedić – singer
- Vladan Desnica – writer
- Bogdan Diklić – actor
- Jelena Dokić – tennis player
- Ratomir Dujković – football player and manager
- Momčilo Đujić – Chetnik commander
- Božidarka Frajt – actress
- Goran Hadžić – president of the Republic of Serbian Krajina
- Đura Horvatović – Serbian general and Minister of Army
- Stojan Janković – uskok
- Veljko Kadijević – Yugoslav general
- Jovan Karamata – mathematician
- Milan Kašanin – art historian
- Filip Kljajić – Yugoslav Partisan
- Rade Končar – Yugoslav Partisan
- Miroslav Lazanski – journalist
- Milan Mačvan – basketball player
- Božidar Maljković – basketball coach
- Mirko Marjanović – Prime Minister of Serbia
- Milan Martić – president of the Republic of Serbian Krajina
- Simo Matavulj – novelist
- Dejan Medaković – art historian
- Siniša Mihajlović – football player and manager
- Milutin Milanković – geophysicist
- Nikodim Milaš – bishop of Dalmatia
- Sava Mrkalj – linguist
- Petar Omčikus – painter
- Zaharije Orfelin – polymath
- Omar Pasha – Ottoman field marshal
- Milorad Pavić – writer
- Pavle – Serbian Patriarch
- Ilija Petković – football player and manager
- Nikola Plećaš – basketball player
- Zdravko Ponoš – Serbian general and the Chief of the General Staff of the Serbian Armed Forces
- Svetozar Pribićević – politician
- Aleksandra Prijović – singer
- Dado Pršo – football player
- Milorad Pupovac – politician
- Branko Radičević – poet
- Josif Rajačić – Metropolitan of Sremski Karlovci
- Jovan Rašković – politician
- Gavrilo Rodić – Austrian and Austro-Hungarian general
- Simeon Roksandić – sculptor
- Josif Runjanin – composer
- Slobodan Selenić – writer
- Peja Stojaković – basketball player
- Jasna Šekarić – shooter
- Rade Šerbedžija – actor
- Jelena Nemanjić Šubić – medieval princess
- Stevan Šupljikac – Duke of Serbian Vojvodina
- Neda Ukraden – singer
- Ognjeslav Utješenović – politician
- Nikola Tesla – mechanical and electrical engineer, inventor
- Dragan Travica – volleyball player
- Vladimir Velebit – diplomat
- Vladimir Velmar-Janković – writer
- Grigor Vitez – poet and novelist
- Vladimir Vujasinović – water polo player and coach

== See also ==
- Serbs of Zagreb
- Serbs of Vukovar
- Croatia–Serbia relations

== Sources ==
=== Books ===
- Allen, Beverly (1996). Rape Warfare: The Hidden Genocide in Bosnia-Herzegovina and Croatia. University of Minnesota Press. ISBN 978-0816628186.
- Artuković, Mato (2001). Srbi u Hrvatskoj: Khuenovo doba (in Croatian).
- Bataković, Dušan T., ed. (2005). Histoire du peuple serbe [History of the Serbian People] (in French). Lausanne: L’Age d’Homme. ISBN 9782825119587. Archived from the original on 29 September 2024.
- Begović, Nikola (1887). Život i običaji Srba-Graničara (in Serbian). Tiskarski zavod "Narodnih novinah". ( Public domain)
- Bideleux, Robert; Jeffries, Ian (2006). The Balkans: A Post-Communist History. The Lord Byron Foundation for Balkan Studies. ISBN 9780415229623.
- Ćirković, Sima (2004). The Serbs. Malden: Blackwell Publishing. ISBN 9781405142915.
- Ćorović, Vladimir (2001) [1997]. Istorija srpskog naroda (Internet ed.). Belgrade: Ars Libri. Archived from the original on 26 April 2009. (in Serbo-Croatian)
- Curta, Florin (2006). Southeastern Europe in the Middle Ages, 500–1250. Cambridge University Press. ISBN 978-0-521-89452-4.
- Karl Freiherr von Czoernig: "Ethnographie der österreichischen Monarchie", Vol. II, III, Wien, 1857.
- Dabić, Vojin S., ed. (1998). Persecution of Serbs and Ethnic Cleansing in Croatia 1991—1998: Documents and Testimonies. Belgrade: Serbian Council Information Center.
- Dakina, Gojo Riste (1994). Genocide Over the Serbs in the Independent State of Croatia: Be Catholic Or Die. Institute of Contemporary History. ISBN 9788674030585.
- Derić, Vasilije (1914). O Srpskom imenu po zapadnijem krajevima našega naroda.
- Đurić, Veljko Đ. (1991). Prekrštavanje Srba u Nezavisnoj Državi Hrvatskoj: prilozi za istoriju verskog genocida. Alfa.
- Dvornik, F.; Jenkins, R. J. H.; Lewis, B.; Moravcsik, Gy.; Obolensky, D.; Runciman, S. (1962). P. J. H. Jenkins (ed.). De Administrando Imperio: Volume II. Commentary. Athlone Press.
- Erdeljanović, Jovan (1930). O poreklu Bunjevaca. Srpska kraljevska akademija.
- Fine, John Van Antwerp Jr. (1991) [1983]. The Early Medieval Balkans: A Critical Survey from the Sixth to the Late Twelfth Century. Ann Arbor, Michigan: University of Michigan Press. ISBN 0472081497.
- Fine, John Van Antwerp Jr. (1994) [1987]. The Late Medieval Balkans: A Critical Survey from the Late Twelfth Century to the Ottoman Conquest. Ann Arbor, Michigan: University of Michigan Press. ISBN 0472082604. Archived from the original on 28 September 2024.
- Fine, John Van Antwerp Jr. (2005). When Ethnicity Did Not Matter in the Balkans: A Study of Identity in Pre-Nationalist Croatia, Dalmatia, and Slavonia in the Medieval and Early-Modern Periods. Ann Arbor, Michigan: University of Michigan Press. ISBN 0472025600.
- Frucht, Richard C. (2005). Eastern Europe: An Introduction to the People, Lands, and Culture. ABC-CLIO. ISBN 978-1-57607-800-6.
- Gavrilović, Slavko (1993). Iz istorije Srba u Hrvatskoj, Slavoniji i Ugarskoj: XV-XIX vek. Filip Višnjić. ISBN 9788673631264.
- Grujić, Radoslav M. (1912). "Најстарија српска насеља по северној Хрватској (до 1597. год)". Гласник Српског Географског Друштва. 1 (2).
- Hoare, Marko (2006). Genocide and Resistance in Hitler's Bosnia: The Partisans and Chetniks, 1941–1943. Oxford: Oxford University Press. ISBN 9780191734458.
- Ilić, Jovan (1995). "The Serbs in the Former SR of Croatia". The Serbian Questions in the Balkans. Archived from the original on 11 May 2020.
- Ivić, Aleksa (1909). Seoba Srba u Hrvatsku i Slavoniju (in Serbian). ( Public domain)
- Ivić, Aleksa (1914). Историја Срба у Угарској: од пада Смедерева до сеобе под Чарнојевићем (1459–1690) (in Serbian). Zagreb: Привредникова. ( Public domain)
- Jačov, Marko (1984). Венеција и Срби у Далмацији у XVIII веку. Просвета.
- Jačov, Marko (1990). Srbi u mletačko-turskim ratovima u XVII veku. Sveti arhijerejski sinod Srpske pravoslavne crkve.
- Krestić, Vasilije; Milosavljević, Margot (1997). History of the Serbs in Croatia and Slavonia 1848–1914. Beogradski izdavačko-grafički zavod. ISBN 9788613008880.
- Krestić, Vasilije (2010). Историја Срба у Хрватској и Славонији 1848–1914. Zavod za Udžbenike. ISBN 978-86-17-17047-7.
- Leutloff-Grandits, Carolin (2006). Claiming Ownership in Postwar Croatia: The Dynamics of Property Relations and Ethnic Conflict in the Knin Region. LIT Verlag Münster. ISBN 978-3-8258-8049-1.
- MacDonald, David Bruce (2002). Balkan Holocausts?: Serbian and Croatian Victim Centered Propaganda and the War in Yugoslavia. Manchester: Manchester University Press. ISBN 978-0-7190-6467-8.
- Malcolm, Noel (2002). Bosnia: A Short History. Pan Books. ISBN 978-0-330-41244-5. Archived from the original on 6 January 2017.
- Milaš, Nikodim (1901). Pravoslavna Dalmacija: istorijski pregled (in Serbian). Novi Sad: A. Pajevića. ( Public domain)
- Mileusnić, Slobodan (1997). Spiritual Genocide: A survey of destroyed, damaged and desecrated churches, monasteries and other church buildings during the war 1991–1995 (1997). Belgrade: Museum of the Serbian Orthodox Church.
- Milinković, B. (2001). O srbima u Hrvatskoj: selektivna bibliografija 1984.-1999. godine. Srpsko kulturno društvo Prosvjeta.
- Miller, Nicholas J. (1997). Between Nation and State: Serbian Politics in Croatia Before the First World War. Pittsburgh: University of Pittsburgh Press. ISBN 9780822939894.
- Novak, Viktor (2011). Magnum Crimen: Half a Century of Clericalism in Croatia. Vol. 1. Jagodina: Gambit. ISBN 9788676240494.
- Novak, Viktor (2011). Magnum Crimen: Half a Century of Clericalism in Croatia. Vol. 2. Jagodina: Gambit. ISBN 9788676240494.
- Pavlowitch, Stevan K. (2008). Hitler's New Disorder: The Second World War in Yugoslavia. New York: Columbia University Press. ISBN 9780231700504.
- Pertz, Georg Heinrich, ed. (1845). Einhardi Annales. Hanover.
- Pupovac, M. (1999). Čuvari imena: Srbi u Hrvatskoj i raspad Jugoslavije. Prosvjeta.
- Pupovac, M. (1997). "Raspad Jugoslavije i Srbi u Hrvatskoj". Ljetopis Srpskog kulturnog društva Prosvjeta. 2: 256–264.
- Ramet, Sabrina P. (2006). The Three Yugoslavias: State-Building and Legitimation, 1918–2005. Bloomington: Indiana University Press. ISBN 978-0-253-34656-8.
- Scholz, Bernhard Walter, ed. (1970). Carolingian Chronicles: Royal Frankish Annals and Nithard's Histories. University of Michigan Press.
- Štrbac, Savo (2015). Gone with the Storm: A Chronicle of Ethnic Cleansing of Serbs from Croatia. Knin, Banja Luka, Beograd: Grafid, DIC Veritas. ISBN 9789995589806.
- Tomasevich, Jozo (1975). War and Revolution in Yugoslavia, 1941–1945: The Chetniks. Vol. 1. Stanford: Stanford University Press. ISBN 9780804708579.
- Tomasevich, Jozo (2001). War and Revolution in Yugoslavia, 1941–1945: Occupation and Collaboration. Vol. 2. Stanford: Stanford University Press. ISBN 9780804779241.
- Trbovich, Ana S. (2008). A Legal Geography of Yugoslavia's Disintegration. Oxford University Press. ISBN 978-0-19-533343-5.
- Živković, Tibor (2006). Портрети српских владара: IX-XII век [Portraits of Serbian Rulers: IX-XII Century] (in Serbian). Београд: Завод за уџбенике и наставна средства. ISBN 9788617137548.

=== Journals ===
- Berber, M.; Grbić, B.; Pavkov, S. (2008). "Changes in the share of ethnic Croats and Serbs in Croatia by town and municipality based on the results of censuses from 1991 and 2001". Stanovništvo. 46 (2): 23–62. doi:10.2298/stnv0802023b.
- Božić, Sofija (2010). "Serbs in Croatia (1918–1929): Between the myth of "Greater-Serbian Hegemony" and social reality". Balcanica (41): 185–208. doi:10.2298/BALC1041185B.
- Dabić, Vojin S. (1992). "Wanderungen der Serben nach Kroatien und Slawonien vom Anfang des XVI bis Ende des XVII Jahrhunderts". Историјски часопис. 38 (1991): 43–76.
- Dabić, Vojin S. (2011). "The Habsburg-Ottoman War of 1716–1718 and Demographic Changes in the War-Afflicted Territories". The Peace of Passarowitz, 1718. West Lafayette: Purdue University Press. pp. 191–208. ISBN 978-1-61249-195-0.
- Đurđev, Branislav S.; Livada, Svetozar; Arsenović, Daniela (2014). "The disappearance of Serbs in Croatia". Zbornik Matice Srpske za Društvene Nauke. 148: 583–591.
- Gavrilović, Slavko (1993). "Serbs in Hungary, Slavonia and Croatia in struggles against the Turks (15th-18th centuries)". Serbs in European Civilization. Belgrade: Nova, Serbian Academy of Sciences and Arts, Institute for Balkan Studies. pp. 41–54. ISBN 9788675830153.
- Grujić, Radoslav M. (1912). "Najstarija srpska naselja po severnoj Hrvatskoj". Glasnik srpskog geografskog društva.
- Ilić, J. (2006). "The Serbs in Croatia before and after the break-up of Yugoslavia" (PDF). Zbornik Matice Srpske za Društvene Nauke. 120 (120). Matica srpska: 253–270. doi:10.2298/ZMSDN0620253I.
- Ivanović-Barišić, M. M. (2004). "Serbs in Croatia: Ethnological reflections" (PDF). Teme. 28 (2): 779–788.
- Lajić, I.; Bara, M. (2010). "Effects of the war in Croatia 1991–1995 on changes in the share of ethnic Serbs in the ethnic composition of Slavonia" (PDF). Stanovništvo. 48: 49–73. doi:10.2298/stnv1001049l.
- Ljušić, Radoš (2012). "The Dalmatian Serbs: One nation and two religions: The examples of Marko Murat and Nikodim Milaš". Anali Pravnog Fakulteta u Beogradu. 60 (2): 26–55.
- Mirkovic, D. (2000). "The historical link between the Ustasha genocide and the Croato-Serb civil war: 1991-1995". Journal of Genocide Research. 2 (3): 363–373. doi:10.1080/713677614. S2CID 72467680.
- Roksandić, Drago (1984). "O Srbima u hrvatskim zemljama u Mrkaljevo doba". Književnost. 4–5: 520–534.
- Škiljan, Filip (2009). "Znameniti Srbi u Hrvatskoj" (PDF). Zagreb. Archived from the original (PDF) on 27 September 2018.
- Škiljan, Filip (2014). "Identitet Srba u Hrvatskoj". Croatian Political Science Review. 51 (2). Zagreb. Archived from the original on 29 October 2020.
- Stojanović, M. (2004). "Serbs in Eastern Croatia" (PDF). Glasnik Etnografskog muzeja u Beogradu. 67–68: 387–390.
- Stokes, Gale (2005). "From nation to minority: Serbs in Croatia and Bosnia at the outbreak of the Yugoslav wars". Problems of Post-Communism. 52 (6): 3–20. doi:10.1080/10758216.2005.11052224. S2CID 158041383.
- Seim, Øyvind Hvenekilde (2008). "Including the Serbs of Croatia into Croatia's History Writing". Glasnik Etnografskog muzeja u Beogradu. 21: 55–67. doi:10.1353/ser.0.0041. S2CID 143695144.
- Sadkovich, James (2010). "Forging Consensus: How Franjo Tuđman Became an Authoritarian Nationalist". Review of Croatian History. 6 (1): 7–35. Archived from the original on 23 March 2022.
- Živković, Tibor (2011). "The Origin of the Royal Frankish Annalist's Information about the Serbs in Dalmatia". Homage to Academician Sima Ćirković. Belgrade: The Institute for History. pp. 381–398. ISBN 978-86-7743-091-7.

=== Documents ===
- "OSCE Report on Croatian treatment of Serbs" (PDF). OSCE. 2004. Archived (PDF) from the original on 10 September 2008.
- "The Status of the Croatian Serb Population in Bosnia and Herzegovina" (PDF). United Nations High Commission for Refugees.
- Davidov, Dinko, ed. (1992). War damage sustained by orthodox churches in Serbian areas of Croatia in 1991. Belgrade: Ministry of Information.
- "Application of the Convention on the Prevention and Punishment of the Crime of Genocide (Croatia v. Serbia) – Summary of the Judgment of 3 February 2015" (PDF). International Court of Justice (ICJ). 3 February 2015.
- "Appeals Judgement Summary for Ante Gotovina and Mladen Markač" (PDF). International Criminal Tribunal for the former Yugoslavia. 16 November 2012. Archived (PDF) from the original on 18 December 2020.
- "Croatia: Impunity for abuses committed during "Operation Storm" and the denial of the right of refugees to return to the Krajina" (PDF). Human Rights Watch. August 1996. Archived (PDF) from the original on 24 November 2020.
- "Amnesty International report 2016/2017" (PDF). Amnesty International. 1 January 2017.

=== News ===
- "Court rejects Balkan genocide claims". BBC News. 3 February 2015. Archived from the original on 3 February 2015.
