= M604 railway (Croatia) =

Railway line in Croatia

Lika railway
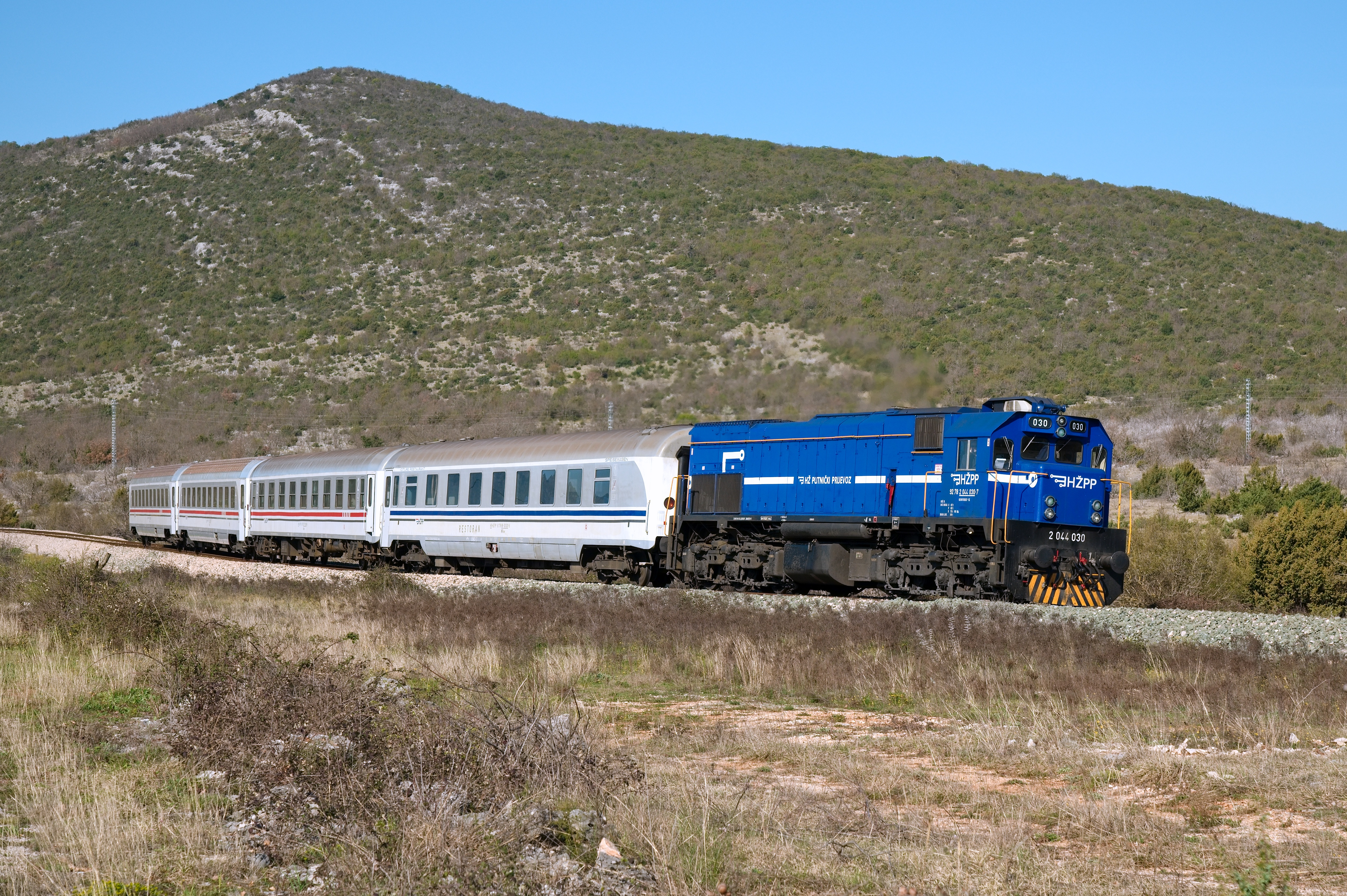
- Train IC 520 "Marjan" of HŽ Putnički prijevoz from Split to Zagreb Glavni kolodvor

Overview
- Native name: Lička pruga
- Owner: HŽ Infrastruktura
- Termini: Oštarije; Knin Split-Harbour

Service
- Type: Regional railway
- Operator: HŽ Passenger Transport

History
- Opened: 1925

Technical
- Track length: 218.6 km (Oštarije-Knin)
- Number of tracks: 1 (2)
- Track gauge: 1,435 mm (4 ft 8 1/2 in)
- Electrification: To be electrified in the future

Lika railway (Croatian: Lička pruga), officially a part of M604 railway, is a 220 km-long single-track, un-electrified railroad connecting Zagreb-Rijeka line with Knin railway hub. It mostly runs through Lika region. M604 railway is the only operating railway link between continental Croatia and Dalmatia, especially its harbors of Split, Zadar (through M606), and Šibenik (M607). Lika railway, finished in 1925, is a key part of this link. The M604 line itself runs from Oštarije/Ogulin on Zagreb-Rijeka railway past Knin, to Split terminus. Its total length is 320 km. Historically, much older Knin-Split section of M604 line (built in 1888) used to be known as Dalmatian railway.

== Operations ==
External videos
- Cabin video, RegioSwinger ride from Ostarije to Knin, August 2021, YouTube and 24sata.hr

=== Rail services ===
HŽ Putnički prijevoz operate a pair of RegioSwinger tilting trains between Zagreb and Split named "Marjan" (doubled to two during the summer, named "Dalmacija" and "Dioklecijan"). These have been often criticized due to the frequent malfunctions, during which CR is forced to replace them with buses on this line. Two night trains with sleeping cars and the car shuttle services run daily throughout the year between Zagreb and Split. They usually change the electric locomotive in Ogulin to a diesel one as the track is electrified from Zagreb to there.

Two pairs of local trains run daily between Ogulin and Plaski and Ogulin and Josipdol each.

==== International Connections ====
During the June–September summer tourist season, RegioJet trains run daily/ 3 times weekly between Split (as M604 terminus) and Prague, Bratislava, Budapest, and starting from 2022, Krakow. Hungarian railways Adria train between Budapest and Split runs daily from June to September. EuroNight train runs between Split and Vienna-Bratislava from June to September.

== History ==
=== Construction 1913–1925 ===
After mapping the line was conducted during 1912, the ground breaking started in the spring of 1913. The line was built from Ogulin southwards by Grünwald und Schiffer company. The quarters for workers, water supply, connecting roads, quarries and sawmills had to be constructed as well to support the building operations. During the mapping of the future railway near Gracac in October 1913, Croatian railway engineer Nikola Turkalj accidentally discovered Cerovac caves. Planners also envisaged a branch from Vrhovine to Otočac, as well as a branch line from Plaški via Rakovica and Slunj to Bihać in near future. In June 1914, 14.000 workers were employed on the construction site. Even the breakout of the First World War did not slow down the building significantly. First 27 km from Ogulin to Plaski were opened on October 14, 1914. At the beginning of 1915, the mobilisation for the war effort and the difficulties facing the home front in Austria-Hungary affected the supply of material and labor force for the construction. On October 18, 1917, Hungarian State Railways revised the contract with the joint stock company founded to build the Lika railway, prolonging the expected opening date to 1920. Plaski-Vrhovine section was opened for limited operation (mostly military transport) on June 12, 1918. War prisoners, mostly Russians and Italians, were also employed on the track. In June 1918, 10.700 workers were still working on Lika line.

The chaos surrounding the dissolution of Austria-Hungary and the end of the war paused the construction, while pillaging, theft, and harassment of Hungarian and Austrian staff by Lika natives even reversed some progress. After 1918, the double track railway between Dalj and Vinkovci was removed and used as materiel for Lika railway. New Yugoslav authorities proceeded with the construction at a slower pace; Vrhovine-Gospić segment was opened on March 23, 1920; Gospić-Gračac on June 15, 1922; and the final segment between Gračac and Knin, finishing the Zagreb-Split/Šibenik line, amidst great celebrations, on July 25, 1925.

=== Between the World Wars ===
The severe winter of 1929 left the Lika line closed for 79 days, starting from January 24. 1200 workers cleared the snow in March 1929 to open the line for traffic. Workers and soldiers tried to clear 6m high snow between Zrmanja and Vrhovine, which was the furthest point that was reachable by train.

=== World War II ===
During the German and Italian occupation of Yugoslavia, occupying forces and the pro-Axis fascist authorities of the puppet Independent State of Croatia could not rely on the Lika railway for cargo, passenger nor military transport from Croatia's north to the south as the sparsely populated and forested terrain was especially prone to attacks, ambushes and sabotages by partisans. Partisans laid mines on tracks and sabotaged signals, blowing up and derailing trains and sections of the track. This rendered the railway useless and very insecure already from early 1942. The very first sabotage on tracks happened on December 1, 1941, near Javornik station. Italian army operated an armored train on Lika line to protect it. After the first unsuccessful raid on Čupkovići viaduct near Oton-Bender on Knin-Gračac section of the railway in the night of May 14/15 1942, when the partisan forces under the command of Ivan Rukavina were pushed back by Italian army Armoured train and the Chetniks, on March 15, 1943, partisan forces of the First Croatian Corps captured the viaduct and blew it up. This definitely and permanently severed the Lika railway till the end of the war. Wehrmacht and ustaša authorities were forced to rely on a road convoy between Bihać and Knin instead.

External images
- Čupkovići viaduct
- Viaduct with four missing pillars after First Croatian Corps blew it up to prevent Axis forces from using it in March 1943.
- Modern view of the viaduct above Bender hamlet belonging to village Oton.
- Cargo train blown off from the viaduct, 1962.

After the liberation of the country and the war's end, Yugoslav Railways managed to begin regular services on Lika line in 1946. Amidst great celebrations, the first train passed the newly rebuilt Čupkovići viaduct near Plavno on Workers' Day 1946, carrying the prime minister of Croatia Vladimir Bakarić and other functioneers.

=== Socialist Yugoslavia ===
In the mid and late 1940s, Lika line served to transport many peasants from Lika to Vojvodina in the federal government-run resettlement operation, aimed at reducing agrarian overpopulation of infertile Lika and Dalmatian hinterland.

In December 1948, 50 km shorter Una railway (Bihać-Knin) was opened as an alternative rail link between Croatia's north and south. Lika line lost some of the passenger and especially cargo transport to Una line. In addition to being shorter and having a lower profile, Una line was later also electrified up to Knin, in contrast to Lika railway. This resulted in longer travelling time on Lika railway. For instance, Split-Zagreb-Budapest Maestral train reached Zagreb in 7h43' in 1987, more than an hour longer than a competing train (Marjan Express) running on Una line. InterCity passenger Mediteran express traversed the line from Split to Zagreb in just under 8 hours. As Zadar was connected to the railway network after Zadar-Knin railway was finished in 1967, another Inter-city train, Kornat express, provided a direct connection between Šibenik railway station/Zadar and Zagreb during summer. It took Kornat express 6h30' between Zadar and Zagreb.

In the early morning of August 15, 1949, Zagreb-Split passenger train 1012 collided with a cargo train transporting iron ore in Plavno station after the drunken station master failed to realize the trains were to meet (cross) there. Collision left 21 dead and 19 injured; station master Luka Javorina (1922–1949) was tried, convicted, and executed by a firing squad, while three other railway workers received prison sentences.

In December 1962, extremely strong bora wind blew an empty cargo train off Cupkovica viaduct near Oton, killing 4 crew members. 13 cars in total were blown off the viaduct. On September 29, 1983, in Bilaj, Ogulin-Gracac passenger train collided with a bus, killing 25 and injuring 24 in a deadliest bus accident in Croatia up to day.

=== Croatian War of Independence ===
On the eve of the breakup of Yugoslavia, ethnic tensions and the opposition of Serbs in northern Dalmatia and Lika to the Croatian government led to a series of incidents and interruptions of rail transport on the Lika line. On October 4, 1990, the line was (allegedly) bombed near Zrmanja Vrelo; on October 17 a mine was laid on the tracks between Malovan and Gračac. Passengers and railway personnel were harassed on the track segments around Knin hub and the traffic was frequently interrupted. Goods from cargo trains were also stopped in Knin and taken over by rebel Serb authorities. The traffic on the line was finally severed on July 24, 1991 as separatist Serbs blocked the railway line leading into the Lika (from north) and Northern Dalmatia (from south) across the territories where they comprised the ethnic majority and proclaimed their secession. As the Croatian Railways were not in position to guarantee safety, they formally and officially closed the line north from Drniš and south from Gračac on August 7. As the breakaway Republic of Serb Krajina controlled most of the line between the fall of 1991 and August 1995, Croatian Railways organized passenger services only north of Josipdol connecting it to Ogulin & Zagreb/Rijeka and south of Perković (Split-Perković, branching off to Šibenik).

Some minor local passenger traffic was organised by separatist authorities between Drniš, Knin and Gračac between 1991 and 1994, plagued by severe fuel shortages and rationing. Serb Krajina Army even operated an improvised armoured train (Krajina Express) on Lika railway to support its combat operations against Croatian Army. After the Croatian forces overran and liberated the occupied territories during the Operation Storm in early August 1995 and Croatian Railways had taken over, CR found significant damage along the Lika line stemming from combat operations, theft and destruction. The line was severed in some places, Simac tunnel had caved in, signals, phone cables, automatic switchboards were damaged, and stations in Josipdol, Plaški, Vrhovine, Lički Osik, Gospić and Medak were damaged or destroyed. CR CEO estimated the repair cost at HRK 50 million in 1995.

External videos
- Test train ride Plavno-Split-Plavno after the war in August 1995, YouTube

The first passenger train from Zagreb to Split after the end of the war (dubbed the Freedom train) passed on Lika line on August 26, 1995, carrying president Tuđman. On August 27, Zagreb-Knin-Split Marjan Express passenger train continued its regular operations.

=== Since 1995 ===
Many rail stations buildings between Knin and Ostarije were left destroyed or decrepit. Due to the mass exodus of Serb population from the area, the demand for local and regional passenger transportation dwindled. In 1999, local/regional service between Vrhovine and Knin was canceled, leaving the section of the Lika line north from Knin and south from Plaški without any rail connections other than the long-distance Zagreb-Split trains.

By 2004/5, reconstruction of the railway tracks (reduction of too sharp bends and curves and too steep sections, new signaling devices) resulted in substantial reduction of the travel time on Lika railway.

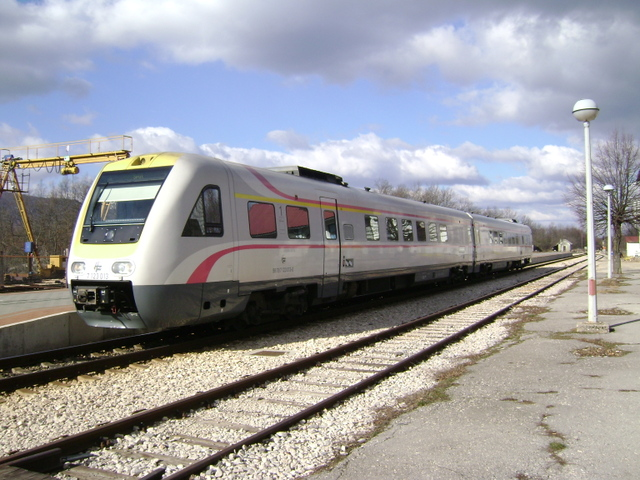
RegioSwinger in Gračac rail station

In 2006, a RegioSwinger collided with a truck near Knin. On August 21, 2008, a RegioSwinger derailed in a curve near Cerovac, while in October 2008, a train of the same type hit a cow herd on the tracks near Zrmanja. In February 2012, Split-Zagreb train derailed between Zrmanja and Malovan, with no-one injured. In May 2012, a cargo train transporting bricks derailed in Malovan.

In 2014, HŽ Putnički prijevoz, the successor of Croatian Railways' passenger transport division, discontinued the night train between Zagreb and Split save for the summer operations, citing economic reasons. However, its regular operations (three times a week per direction from October to June and daily from June to October) were reintroduced in 2016. The night train assumed its daily operations the following year.

A cargo train derailed in Plaski in October 2018.

== Map ==
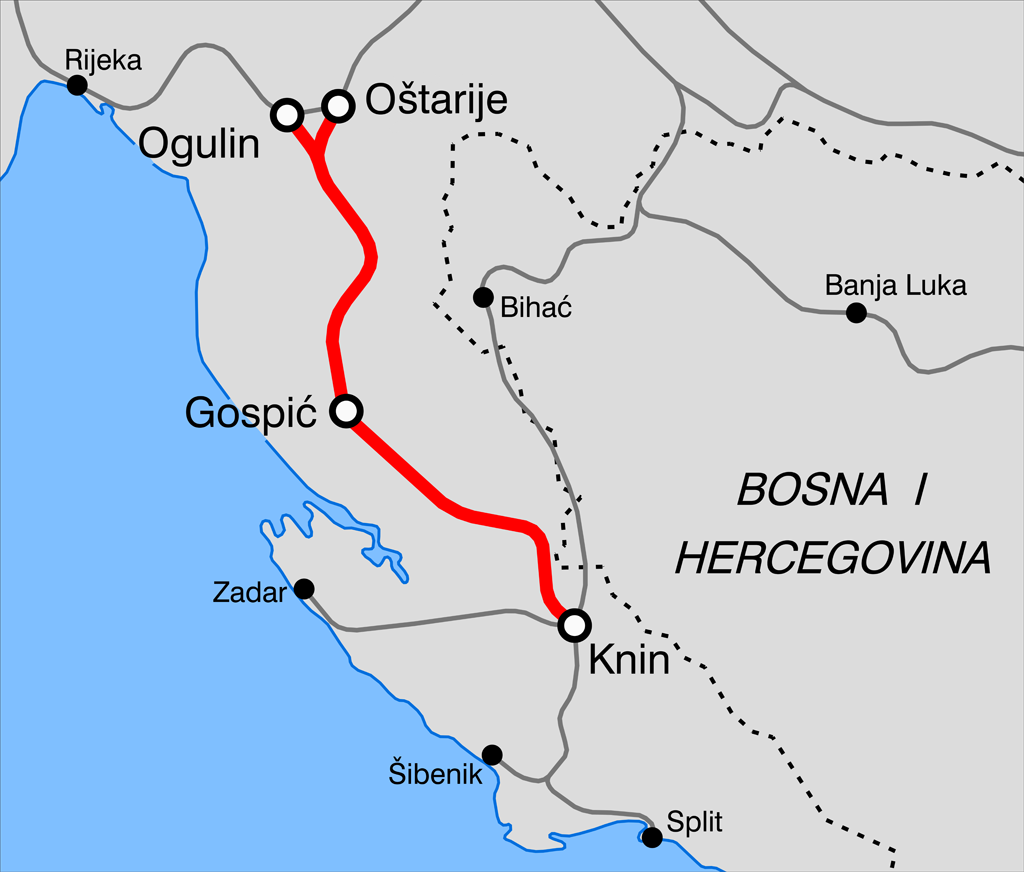

== Literature ==
- Barić, Nikica (1998). "Željeznički promet i njegova zaštita u NDH (1941-1945)". Radovi: Radovi Zavoda za hrvatsku povijest Filozofskoga fakulteta Sveučilišta u Zagrebu (in Croatian). 30 (1). ISSN 0353-295X.
- Bunijevac, Helena (2003) Najskuplja zeljeznica na svijetu. EuroCity 3, p. 80 ff.
- Bunijevac, Helena (2011). "Željeznica kao preduvjet gospodarskog razvoja Like" (PDF). In Holjevac, Željko (ed.). Identitet Like i Krbave: Korijeni i razvitak, knjiga 1. Gospic-Zagreb: Institut društvenih znanosti Ivo Pilar – Područni centar Gospić. pp. 542–569. ISBN 978-953-6666-65-2.
- Gorničić-Brdovački, Josip (1952). Razvitak željeznica u Hrvatskoj do 1918. godine (in Croatian). Jugoslavenska akademija znanosti i umjetnosti.
- Horvat, Rudolf (1941). "15. Lička željeznica". Lika i Krbava: Povijesne crtice, slike i bilješke, sv. 1. Zagreb: Matica hrvatska.
- Herceg, Bruno (2015-03-31). "Vozni red: vrijeme putovanja vlakom je kroz godine podložno promjenama". savez za zeljeznicu.
- Jelaska Marijan, Zdravka (2009). "Prugom, cestom, zrakom, a i morem ako treba". Hrvatska revija. No. 4.
- Jelinović, Zvonimir (1957). Borba za jadranske pruge i njeni ekonomski ciljevi. Zagreb: Jugoslavenska akademija znanosti i umjetnosti. OCLC 245664803.
- Lajnert, Siniša (2007). "Pregled ustroja i rada Hrvatskih željeznica u Domovinskom ratu". Arhivski vjesnik (in Croatian). 50 (1). ISSN 0570-9008.
- Oberregger, Elmar (2007): Die wichtigsten Hauptbahnen. Sattledt (Zur Eisenbahngeschichte des Alpen-Donau-Adria-Raumes 3).
- Pejnović, Dane (September 1, 1993). "Utjecaj prometnog sustava na socijalnogospodarski razvoj i organizaciju prostora ličke regije". Hrvatski geografski glasnik. 55 (1): 157–180.
- Valentić, Mirko (1990). "Osnovni problemi prometne integracije i jadranske orijentacije hrvatskoga poduzetničkog građanstva u XIX stoljeću". Povijesni prilozi (in Croatian). 9 (9): 37–84. ISSN 0351-9767.
- "Gradnja ličke željeznice". Jutarnji list. No. 107. 1912-07-07. pp. 1–3.
