= Deaths in March 1984 =

The following is a list of notable deaths in March 1984.

Entries for each day are listed alphabetically by surname. A typical entry lists information in the following sequence:

- Name, age, country of citizenship at birth, subsequent country of citizenship (if applicable), reason for notability, cause of death (if known), and reference.

== March 1984 ==
=== 1 ===
- Jackie Coogan, 69, American actor, heart failure

=== 2 ===
- Mebrure Aksoley, 81, Turkish politician, educator, philanthropist, and women's rights activist

=== 3 ===
- Sir John Adams, 63, English accelerator physicist and administrator

=== 4 ===
- Julio Ahumada, 67, Argentine bandoneonist, composer, and orchestra conductor

=== 5 ===
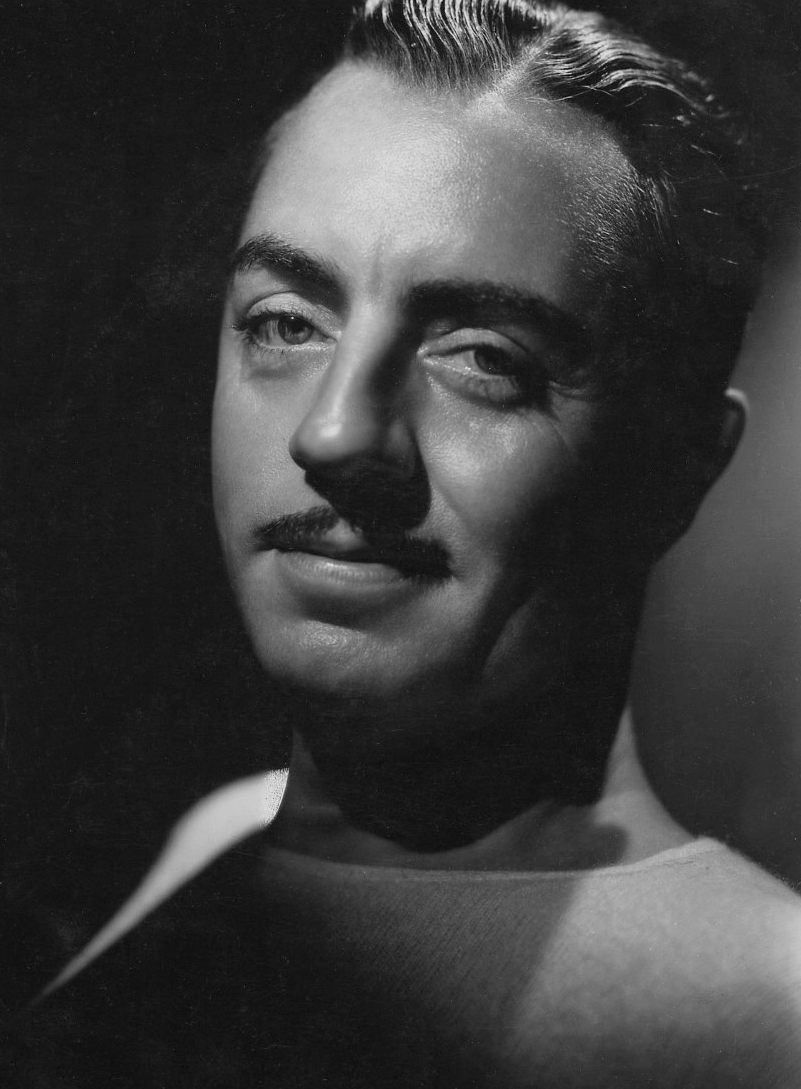
William Powell

- Faraj Abbo, 62, Assyrian Iraqi artist, theatre director, designer, author and educator
- Tito Gobbi, 70, Italian operatic baritone
- William Powell, 91, American actor, pneumonia

=== 6 ===
- Martin Niemöller, 92, German theologian and Lutheran pastor
- Henry Wilcoxon, 78, British actor, heart failure

=== 7 ===
- Robert Bloch, 95, French racing driver
- Paul Rotha, 76, English documentary film-maker, film historian and critic

=== 8 ===
- John Adamson, 73, Australian politician
- John F. Shelton, 81, Australian rules footballer

=== 9 ===
- Skënder Jareci, 52, Albanian former football manager and player
- Kim Il, 73, North Korean politician who served as Premier of North Korea

=== 10 ===
- June Marlowe, 80, American actress, Parkinson's Disease

=== 11 ===
- Charles Hodson, Baron Hodson, 88, British judge

=== 12 ===
- Antònia Abelló, 80, Spanish political activist, republican journalist, pianist, writer, and feminist
- Hakon Ahlberg, 92, Swedish architect, author, and editor
- Arnold Ridley, 88, English playwright and actor

=== 13 ===
- Marija Ilić Agapova, 88, Serbian jurist, translator, librarian, civil rights activist and the first director of the Belgrade City Library

=== 14 ===
- Aurelio Peccei, 75, Italian industrialist and philanthropist, co-founder of the Club of Rome, heart attack

=== 15 ===
- Ken Carpenter, 70, American Olympic athlete
- Konstantin Badygin, 73, Soviet Naval officer and explorer

=== 16 ===
- Ervin Abel, 54, Estonian actor
- Friedrich Wilhelm Albrecht, 89, Polish Lutheran missionary and pastor

=== 17 ===
- Paul Woolley, 82, American pastor and professor
- Jeffrey Doucet, 25, Karate instructor and child molester

=== 18 ===
- Paul Francis Webster, 76, American lyricist

=== 19 ===
- Komatsu Imai, 84, Japanese aviator and essayist
- Bo Ljungberg, 72, Swedish athlete
- Charlie Ware Snr, 80, Irish hurler

=== 20 ===
- John Fairbairn, 72, South African Naval officer
- Robin Tait, 43, New Zealander discus thrower and Olympian

=== 21 ===
- August Frank, 85, German SS functionary who was a Nazi concentration camp administrator
- Carlo Lombardi, 84, Italian actor

=== 22 ===
- Kenneth Wilson, 69, Scotland international rugby union player

=== 23 ===
- Peter Kolosimo, 61, Italian journalist and writer

=== 24 ===
- Sam Jaffe, 93, American actor

=== 25 ===
- Martin Stokken, 61, Norwegian cross-country skier

=== 26 ===
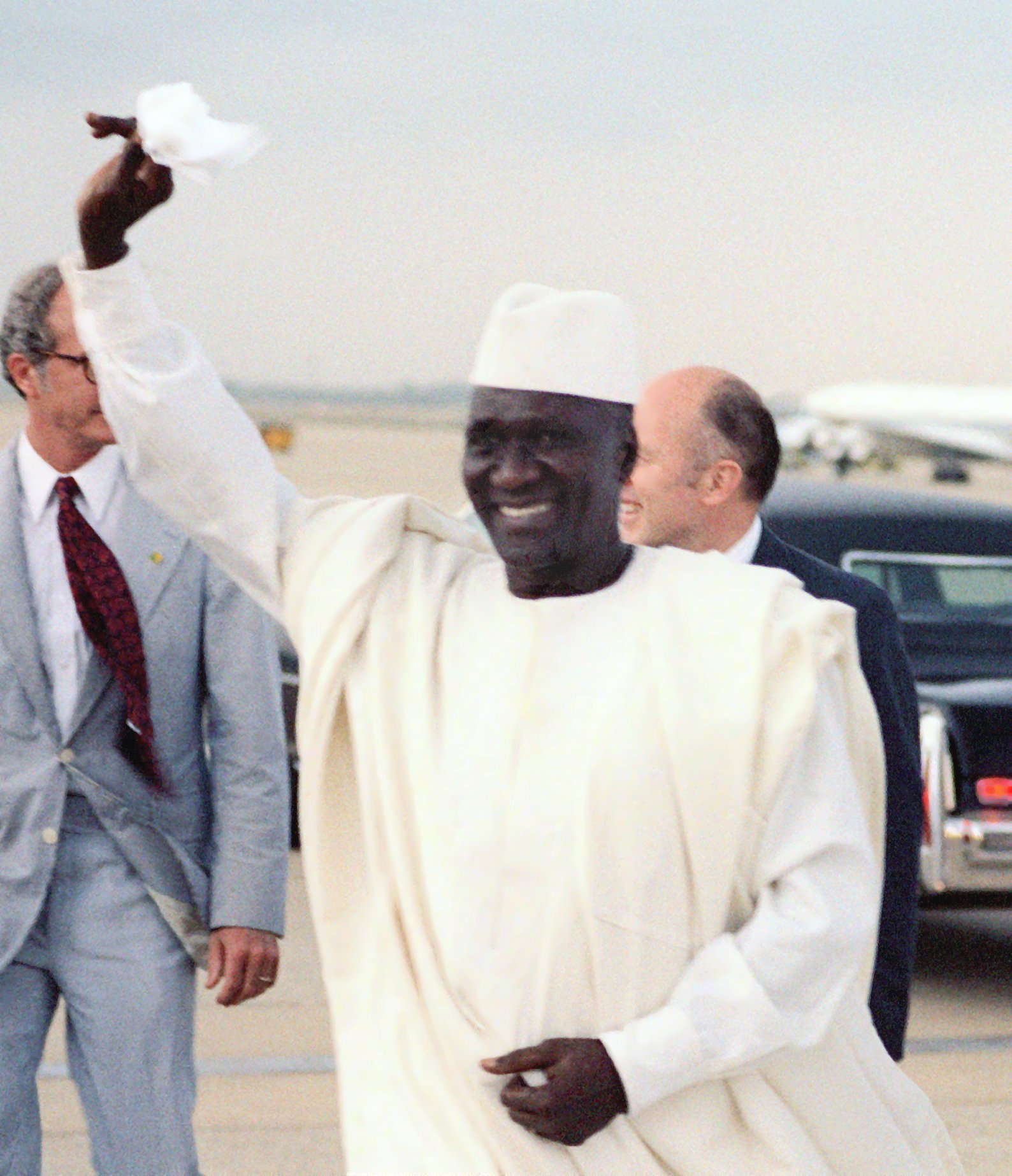
Ahmed Sékou Touré

- Branko Ćopić, 69, Yugoslav writer
- Ahmed Sékou Touré, 62, Guinean politician, 1st President of Guinea, heart attack

=== 27 ===
- Jack Donohue, 75, American film screenwriter and director

=== 28 ===
- Benjamin Mays, 89, American Baptist minister and civil rights leader

=== 29 ===
- Henry Brooke, Baron Brooke of Cumnor, 80, British Conservative Party politician

=== 30 ===
- Karl Rahner, 80, German Jesuit priest and theologian

=== 31 ===
- Jean Drysdale, 44, South African tennis player
