= Mokro Polje =

Mokro Polje Мокро Поље (Serbian)
- Village
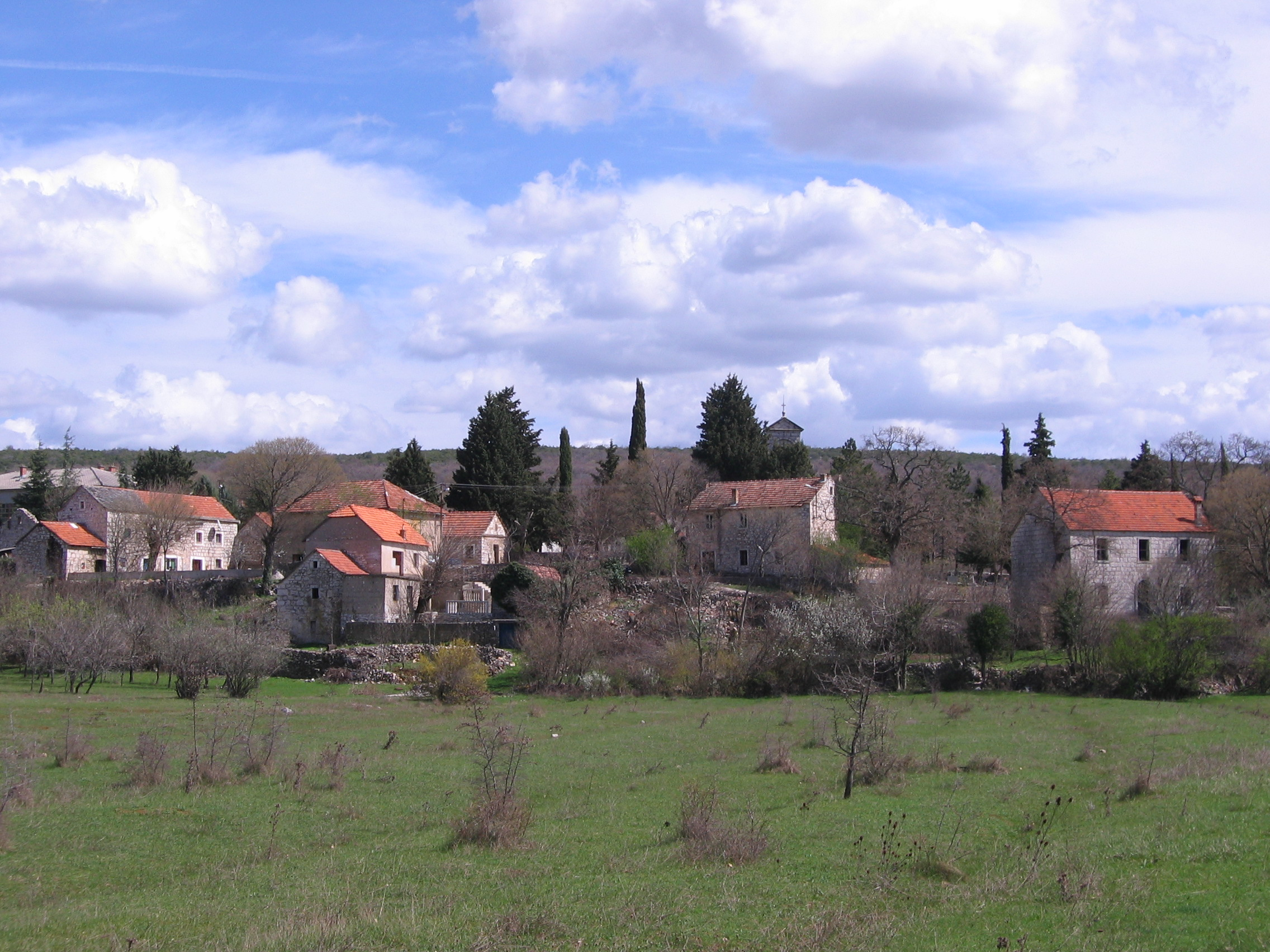
- Interactive map of Mokro Polje
- Location within Croatia
- Coordinates: 44°05′09″N 16°01′50″E
- Country: Croatia
- County: Šibenik-Knin County
- Municipality: Ervenik

Area
  - Total: 55.2 km^{2} (21.3 sq mi)
- Elevation: 181 m (594 ft)

Population (2021)
  - Total: 163
  - Density: 2.95/km^{2} (7.65/sq mi)
- Time zone: UTC+1 (CET)
  - Summer (DST): UTC+2 (CEST)
- Postal code: 22307 Mokro Polje

Mokro Polje (Serbian Cyrillic: Мокро Поље) is a village in Šibenik-Knin County, Croatia. It is one of the largest villages in the municipality of Ervenik. The river Zrmanja flows through Mokro Polje. The 2021 census listed 163 inhabitants.

== History ==
The village features the Serbian Orthodox Church of St. Luke. Nikodim Milaš claimed that the Orthodox Church was built between 1524-1537. Although it was mentioned as an Orthodox Church in the mid-16th century Ottoman defters, it would have been likely founded as a renovation of a medieval Gothic Roman Catholic church. The fact that the village was settled by Roman Catholics in 1636 further brings into question the dating of the Orthodox Church.

A monument to the fallen Yugoslav Partisans and victims of fascism was built in 1952 and destroyed in November 1996.

During the Croatian War, Mokro Polje was included in the Republic of Serbian Krajina (1991–95). During the Croatian Army (HV) Operation Storm offensive in August 1995, the majority of the village's residents fled along with the columns of Serb refugees but some stayed behind. According to various sources, between 5 and 20 Serbs were killed by the Croatian army after they entered the village. A plaque commemorating the victims was raised by locals.

== Culture ==
Mokropoljski susreti - A sporting and cultural event known as Mokropoljski susreti takes place at the end of each July.

== Demographics ==
According to the 2011 census, the village of Mokro Polje has 227 inhabitants. This represents 28.27% of its pre-war population according to the 1991 census.

The 1991 census recorded that 99.75% of the village population were ethnic Serbs (801/803) while 0.25% were of other ethnic origin (2/803).

Historical population 1857-2011
v

population	1051	1192	1247	1351	1663	1727	1668	1791	1863	1910	1718	1355	1119	803	211	227
	1857	1869	1880	1890	1900	1910	1921	1931	1948	1953	1961	1971	1981	1991	2001	2011

Sources: Croatian Bureau of Statistics publications

== Notable natives and residents ==
- Mira Bjedov (born 1955) - a former basketball player who competed for Yugoslavia in the 1980 Summer Olympics.

== Gallery ==
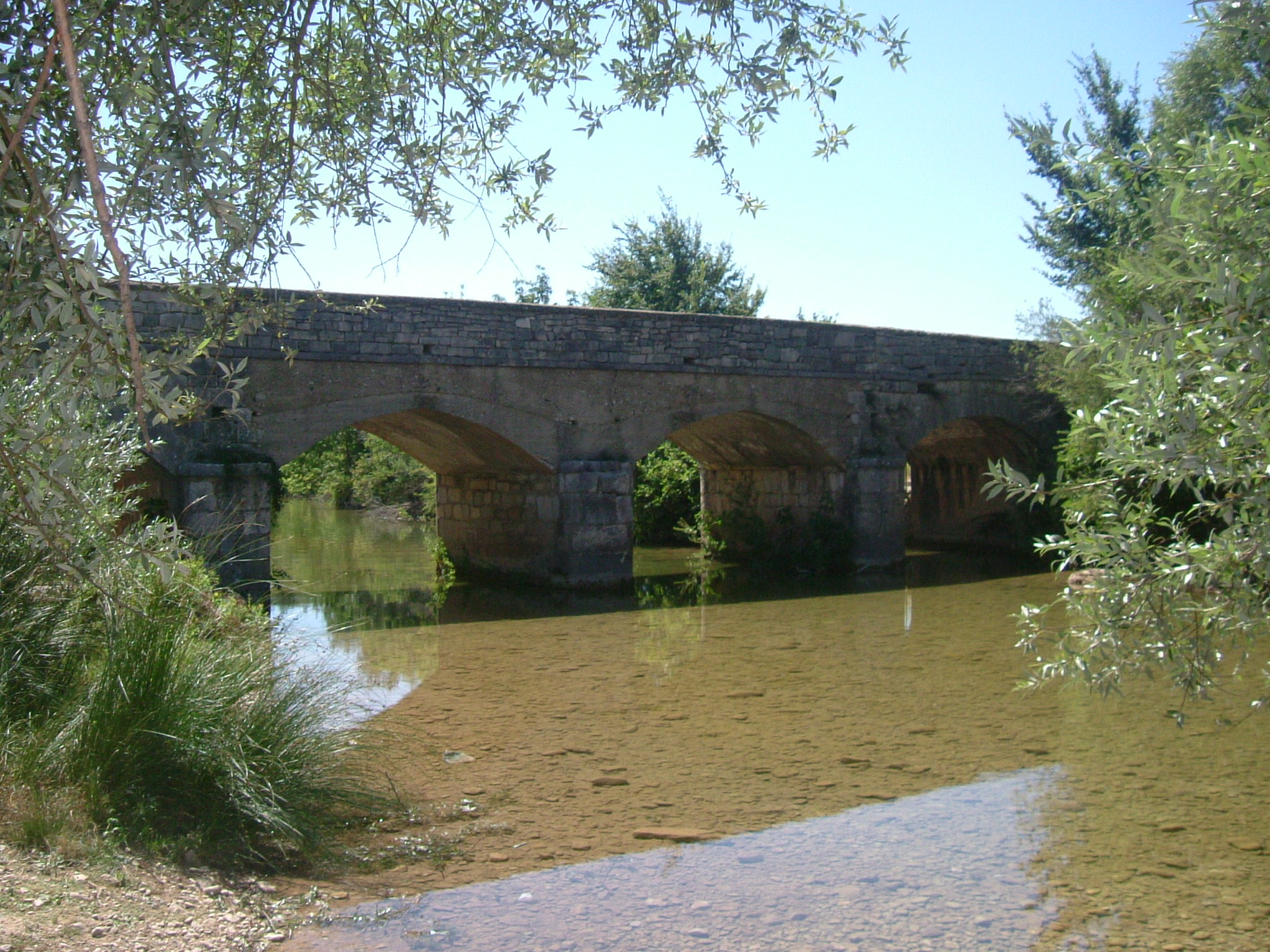
Bridge over the Zrmanja river

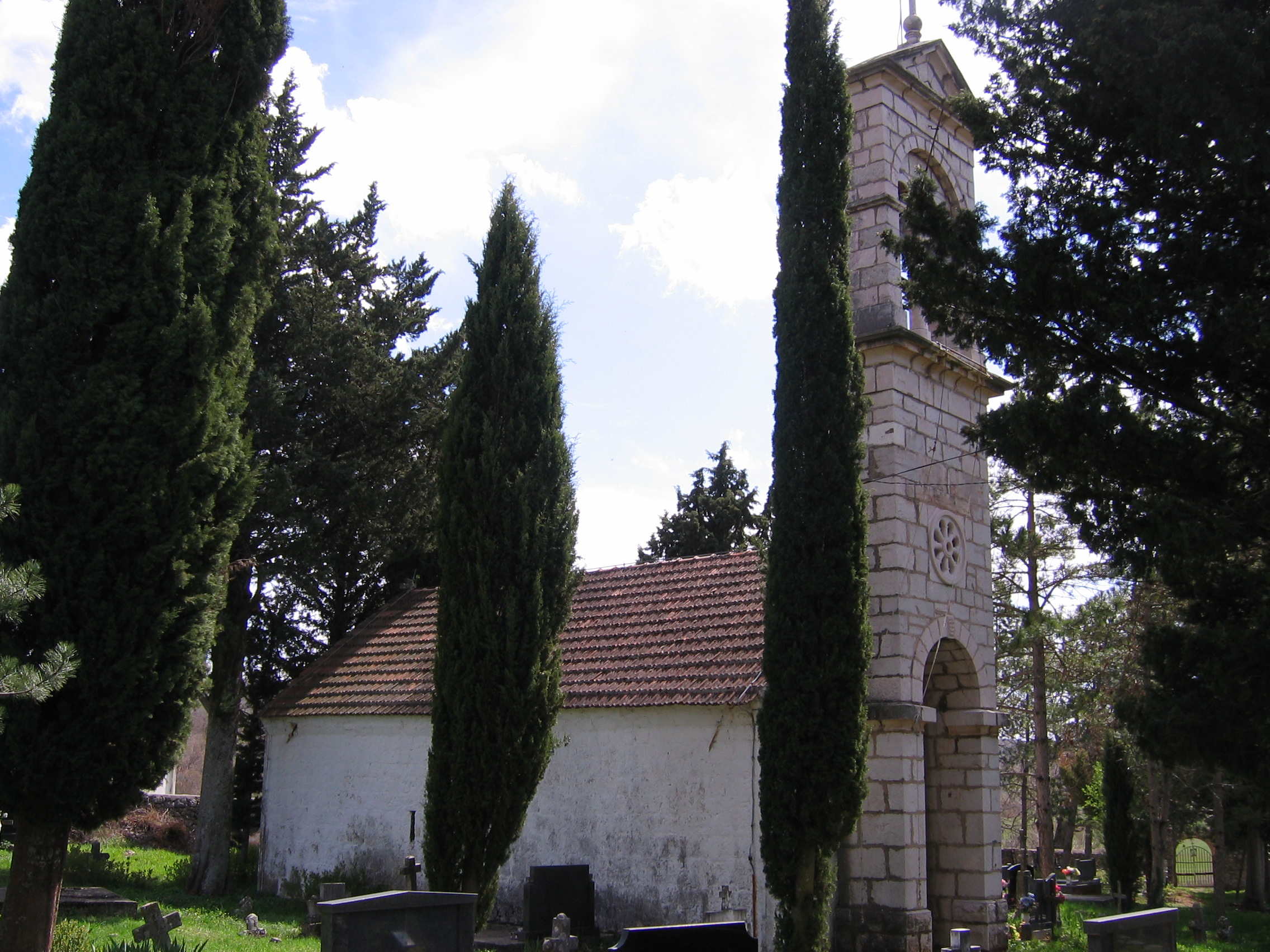
Serb Orthodox Church of St. Luka

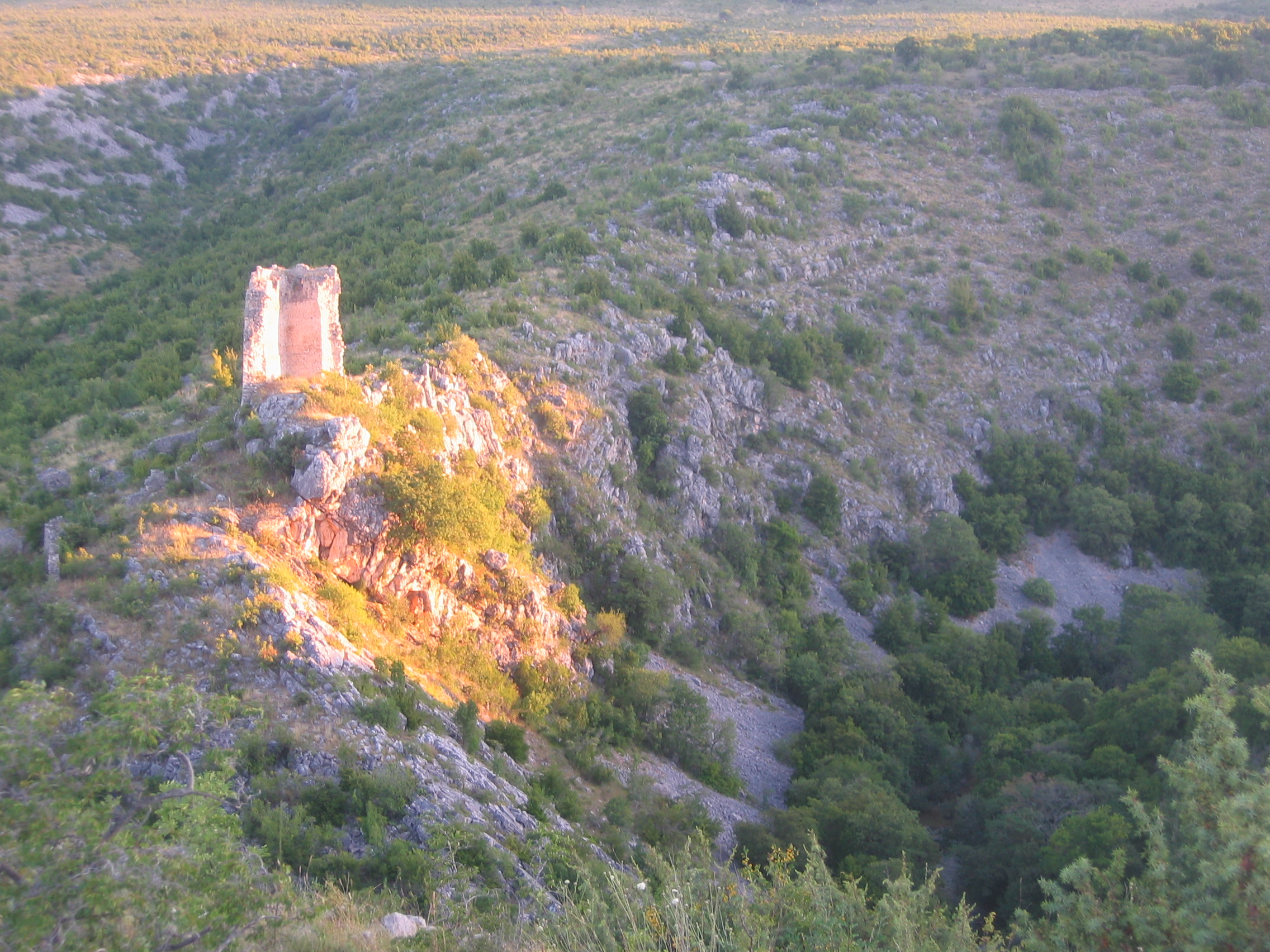
The Keglević fort tower

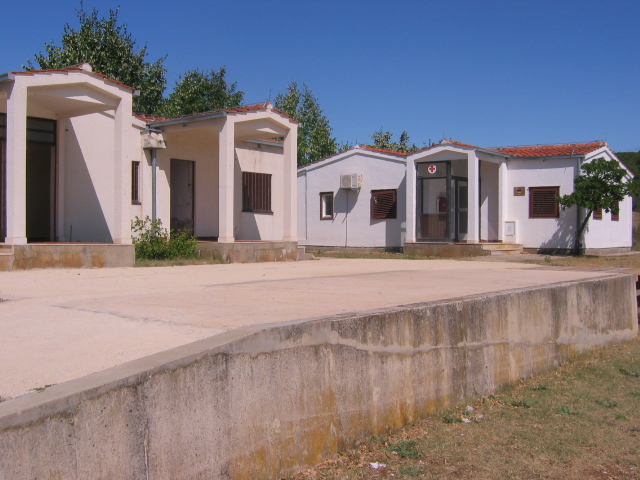
Health centre and post office

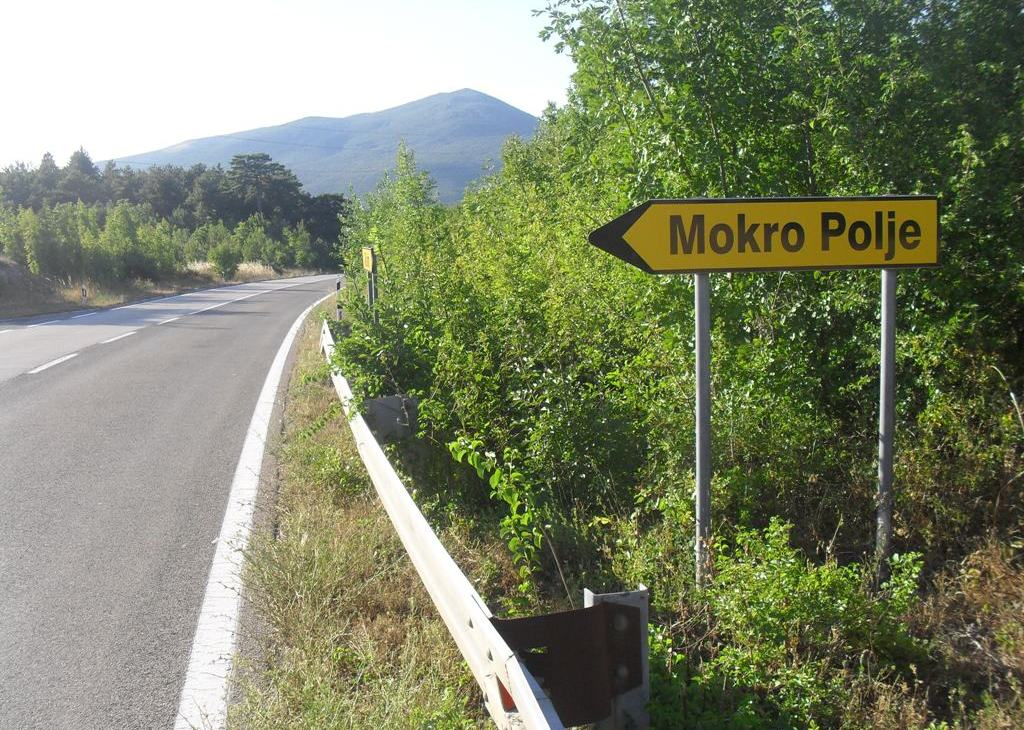
Turn towards Mokro Polje (from Pađene)

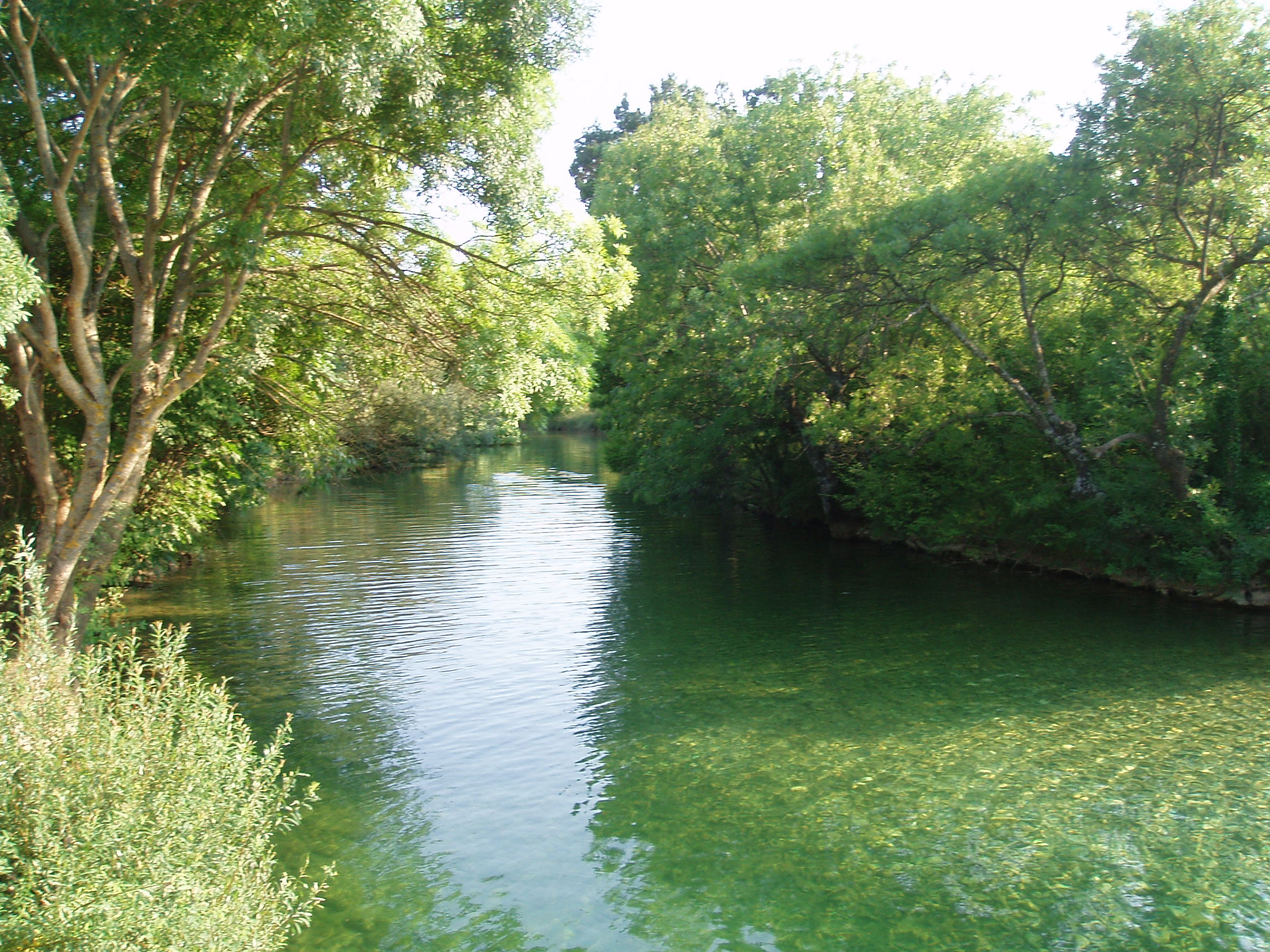
Zrmanja river next to Bjedov

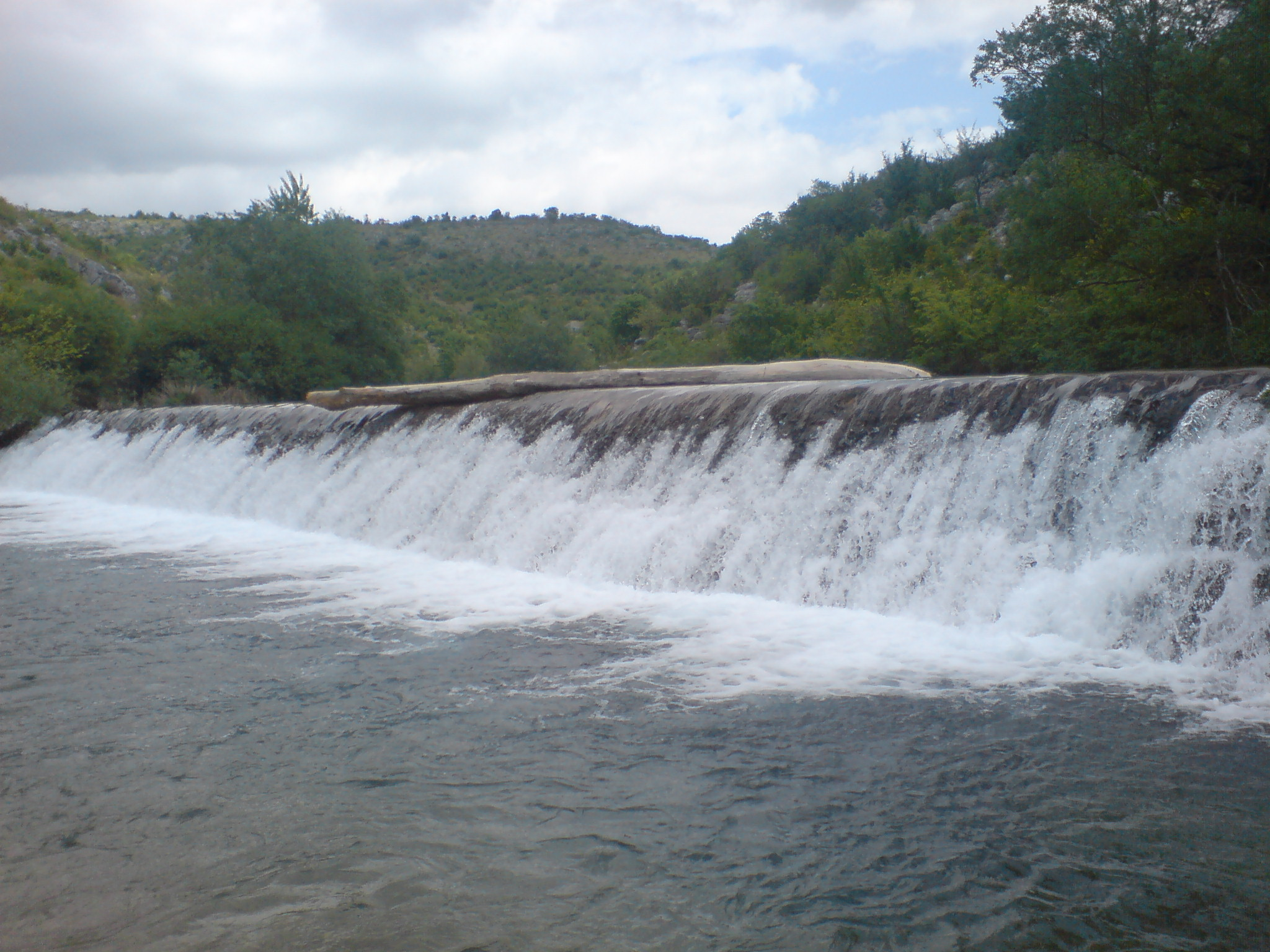
Zrmanja waterfalls
