= Adam Sofronijević =

Serbian library information specialist and university professor

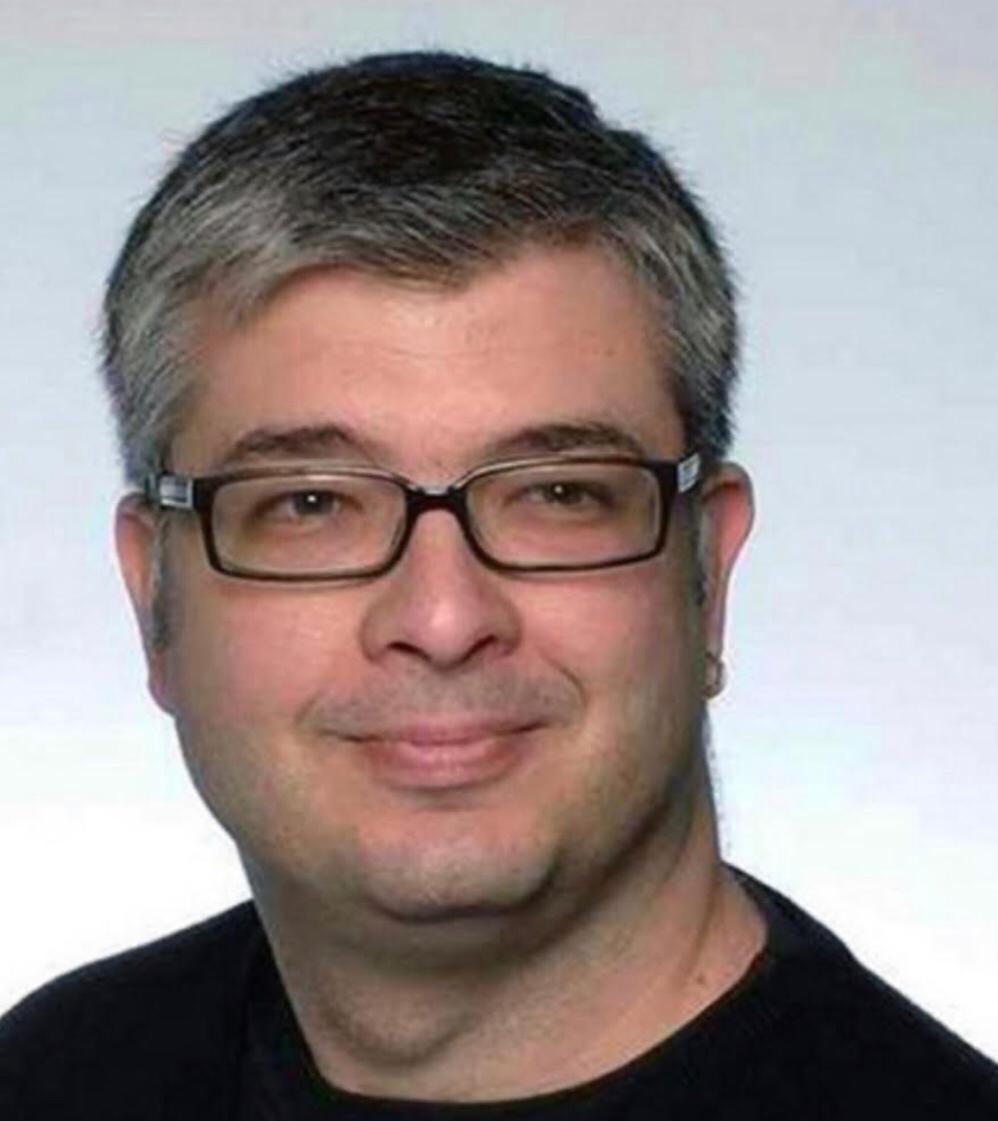
- A photo of Sofronijević in 2015
- Born: 15 July 1973 (age 52); Belgrade, Yugoslavia
- Occupations: library information specialist Librarian
- Years active: 2003-present

Adam Sofronijević (Serbian Cyrillic: Адам Софронијевић; Belgrade, July 15, 1973) is a Serbian library information specialist and university professor. He received several national awards for his work, worked as an organizer of a number of scientific and professional lectures and projects of national importance in the field of digitization in culture.

Sofronijević is a member of the Executive Board of the Association of European Research Libraries (LIBER) and he was a member of the Governing Board of the Belgrade University Library, where he has served as deputy director.

== Biography ==
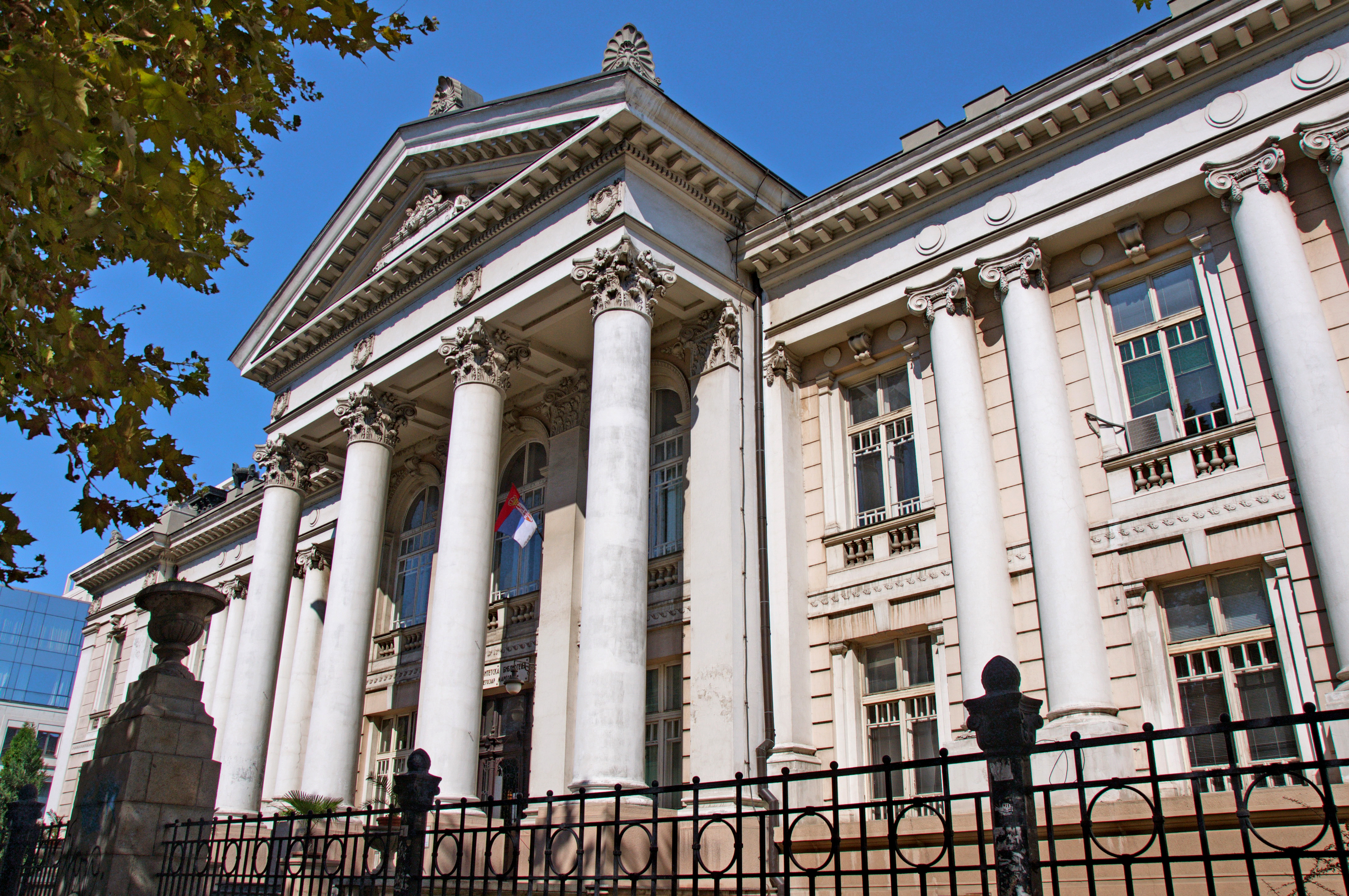
Belgrade University Library, where Sofronijević leads the Digitalization Academy and serves as deputy director

Sofronijević was born in Belgrade on July 15, 1973. He is maternally linked to Nikola Spasić, a noted Serbian businessman and patron.

He finished primary and secondary school in his hometown. After that, he enrolled in the School of Electrical and Computer Engineering of Applied Studies where he graduated in 2003. He studied at the University of Belgrade Faculty of Organizational Sciences where he graduated, while he earned his MA and MSc degrees at the University of Belgrade Faculty of Philology and the Faculty of Organizational Sciences of the University of Belgrade, respectively. He earned his doctoral degree in library and information science at the Faculty of Philology in July 2015 by defending a thesis entitled “A New Paradigm of Library Collaboration”.

As of 2008 Sofronijević has been the Head of Development and System Administration, Digitization and Cultural Activities Department at the University Library “Svetozar Marković”, the first of a kind in Serbia and the region. He has organized and participated in many developments and improvement projects of library and information activities, especially in the field of digitization and virtualization of library services.

As of 2013 Sofronijević has been a member of the Board of Directors of DART (Europe E-thesis Portal). He is one of the initiators of the Republic of Serbia joining the European digital infrastructure DARIAH and its permanent associate. As of 2020, he has been a member of the Executive Board of the Association of European Research Libraries (LIBER, Ligue des Bibliothèques Européennes de Recherche), the largest association of a kind in Europe.

Serbing as a deputy director of the Belgrade University Library, he has initiated a number of programs of professional volunteering at the University Library, the most important being the program of mentoring work with participants within the Digitization Academy.

In addition to his work in the field of digitization, Sofronijević published a number of scientific works and has organized a number of scientific and professional lectures and conferences, such as the one in Le Mans Université in France in 2015. He has been a guest lecturer in 10 countries around Europe.

Sofronijević is a professor at the Faculty of Applied Management, Economics and Finance in Belgrade.

He is a member of the Association for Culture, Art and International Cooperation Adligat where he serves as Vice president. He has organized some of the most important activities such as, for example, the acquisition of the letter by Milan I of Serbia. As a representative of the University Library and a member of Adligat, he coordinated the project entitled “King Milan in Serbian Press” which was on the digitization of articles and books about King Milan. The cooperation between these two institutions resulted in the digitization of extremely rare materials owned by the Association such as war newspapers, old law books, calendars and materials about Belgrade, forming a digital portal about epidemics through history in Serbia with the largest digital base of historical resources, books and texts from periodicals on epidemics in Serbia.

== Awards ==
In 2020 he received the national Marija Ilić Agapova Award for the best Belgrade-based librarian and for noted contributions to the field. As of 2012 and a special acknowledgement from the Ministry of Culture and Information of the Republic of Serbia for contributing to digitization through scientific papers in 2018.

== Selected works ==
- Business aspects of creative industries from a global perspective, 2013
- Smart city as framework for creating competitive advantages in international business management, 2014
- Proposed framework for gamifying information retrieval: case of DART-European research theses portal, 2014
- Smart and sustainable library: Information literacy hub of a new city, 2015
- Building a Gamified system for capturing MOOC related data: Smart city learning community as its most precious source of intangible cultural heritage, 2015
