= Agapova =

Agapova is a surname. Notable people with the surname include:

- Marija Ilić Agapova (1895–1984), Serbian jurist, translator, librarian and civil rights activist
- Mariya Agapova (born 1997), Kazakhstani mixed martial artist
- Nina Agapova (1926–2021), Soviet and Russian actress
