= Capital punishment in Croatia =

Europe holds the greatest concentration of abolitionist states (blue). Map current as of 2024 Abolished for all offences Abolished in practice Retains capital punishment

Capital punishment in Croatia existed until 1991 when it was constitutionally abolished. The last execution had taken place there in 1987 when Croatia was still part of Yugoslavia.

== Notable executions ==
In the time of Yugoslavia, several court cases resulted in capital punishment:

- Luka Javorina, chief of a railway station in Plavno (on today's M604 railway), was drunk at work and caused the death of 20 people in a rail disaster of 15 August 1949. He was executed by firing squad on 24 October 1949.
- Kazimir Antić and his brother Ivan conspired to rob the Kremenić family on Cres. During the robbery, Kazimir Antić murdered Josip Kremenić with a bat, and injured his sister Marija. Antić was sentenced to death on 6 November 1967 and was executed on 6 November 1968.
- Ferdo Darić murdered an elderly couple, Petar and Bara Biličić, in Draganić, by killing them with an axe in their sleep. The Court in Karlovac had him executed in 1970.
- Jovan Bugarski went to rob the house of Adela Bašić in Samobor, and slit the throat of both Adela (46) and her daughter Dragica (23) on 26 April 1964. The Court in Zagreb had him executed by firing squad in the fall of 1966, the last such decision for that Court.
- Nikola Kević was found guilty of a double murder and an attempted murder at the Court in Osijek, with a failed appeal to the Supreme Court of Yugoslavia. On death row, he was kept in solitary confinement and in chains, before he was executed by firing squad on 22 April 1978.

The last civilian execution in Croatia was done in 1987, when a former truck driver Dušan Kosić was executed for the 1 March 1983 murder of his coworker Čedomir Matijević, his wife Slavica and their daughters Dragana (aged 2) and Snježana (8 months old). In the course of the investigation, Kosić provided the investigative judge and police officers a detailed admission to the murders, but retracted it during his later trial. The District Court in Karlovac found him guilty and sentenced him to death on 4 October 1983. Kosić was executed by firing squad on January 29, 1987.

Capital punishment was outlawed by article 21 of the 1990 Constitution of Croatia.

Croatia is a signatory of Protocol 13 of the European Convention on Human Rights that abolishes the death penalty in all circumstances. The convention was signed on 3 July 2002, ratified on 3 February 2003, and came into force on 1 July 2003.

== Executions since 1959 ==
Source: SPSK Database

Executed person	Gender	Date of sentence	Date of execution	Place of execution	Crime	Method
Pavao Čekada	Male	1960	29 March 1960	Varaždin	war crimes	firing squad
Stevo Ovčar	Male	6 October 1959	December 1960	Osijek	murder of a police officer	firing squad
Jovan Bugarski	Male	6 June 1965	24 February 1965	Zagreb	double murder	firing squad
Kazimir Antić	Male	6 November 1967	5 November 1968	Rijeka	murder during robbery	firing squad
Ferdo Dorić	Male	1970	1970	Karlovac	double murder	firing squad
Kosta Dujić	Male	27 November 1974	1976	Split	double murder	firing squad
Nikola Kević	Male	1977	22 April 1978	Osijek	double murder	firing squad
Dušan Kosić	Male	4 October 1983	29 January 1987	Karlovac	multiple murder	firing squad
