= Šibenik railway station =

Railway station in Šibenik, Croatia

Šibenik
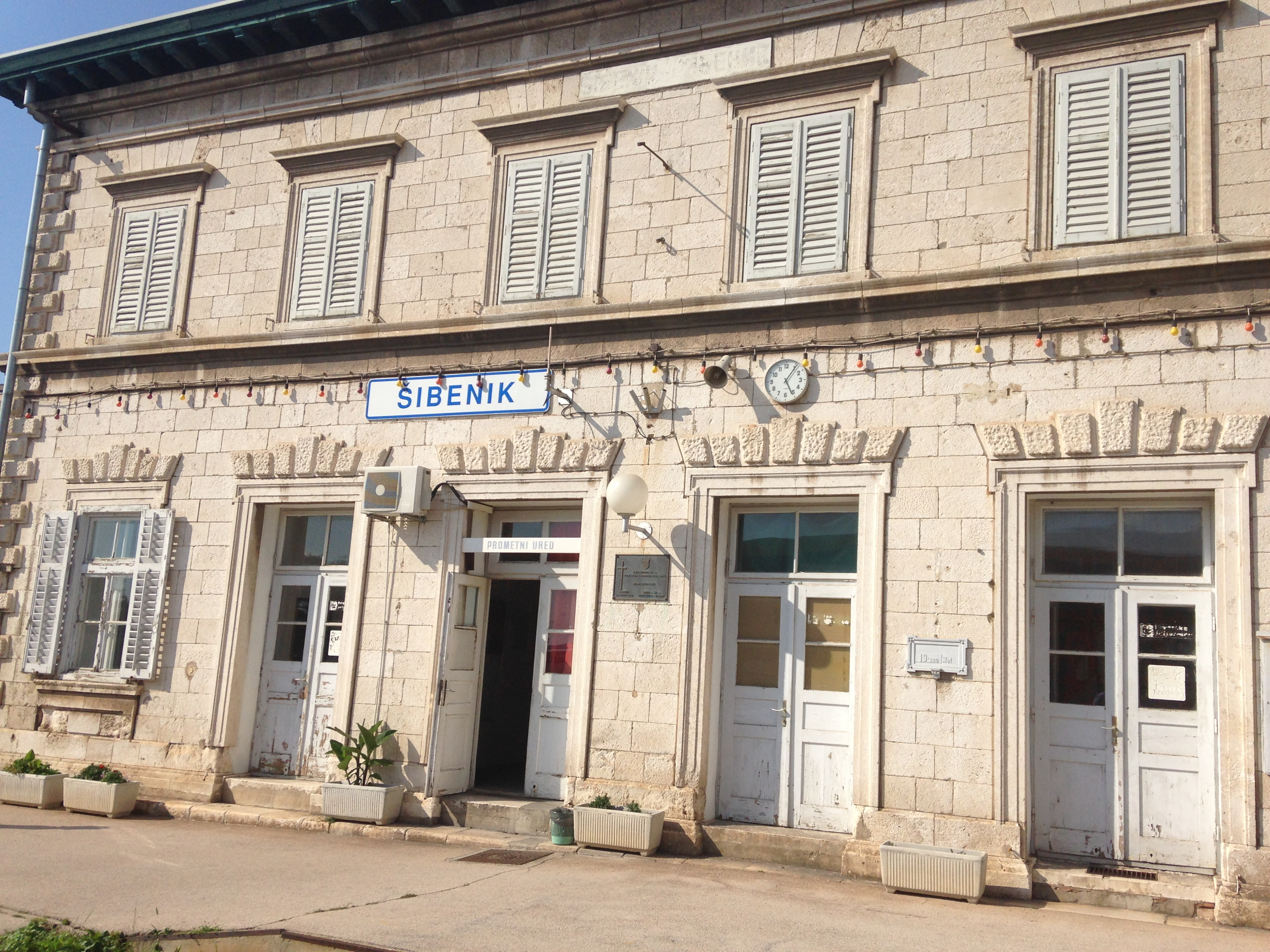

General information
- Location: Fra Jeronima Milete 24, 22000 Šibenik; Croatia
- Coordinates: 43°43′49″N 15°53′59″E
- Line: M607 Perković-Šibenik railway
- Platforms: 4

History
- Opened: 4 October 1887
Location

Šibenik is a railway station located in Šibenik, Croatia. The station was opened on 4 October 1887 and is the terminus of the Perković-Šibenik railway, a branch of M604 railway connecting Zagreb and Split via Knin. The train services are operated by HŽ Passenger Transport.

== Building ==
Siverić-Split line, the first railway line in Dalmatia, was built between 1874-6 to enable the exploitation of coal pits near Siverić and facilitate its export via Split harbor. A branch from Perković to Šibenik was built to connect the coal mines with Šibenik harbor as well. Šibenik station was built from stone in May 1877 in historicist style with elements of neorenaissance. The complex also includes a train depot and a water stop, previously serving steam locomotives.

== Train service ==
The following services currently call at Šibenik:

- 4x per day Šibenik-Knin
- 4x per day Šibenik-Perković (1x daily to Unesić)
- 4x per day Perković-Šibenik (1x daily from Unešić)
- 4x per day Knin-Šibenik

== Connections ==
The train station is in the immediate vicinity of the central bus station, local bus stop (Trznica), and the port passenger terminal.
