= Radučić =

Radučić Радучић (Serbian)
- Village
- Location of Radučić in Croatia.
- Coordinates: 44°05′53″N 16°06′15″E
- Country: Croatia
- County: Šibenik-Knin County
- Municipality: Ervenik

Area
  - Total: 28.9 km^{2} (11.2 sq mi)
- Elevation: 297 m (974 ft)

Population (2021)
  - Total: 196
  - Density: 6.78/km^{2} (17.6/sq mi)
- Time zone: UTC+1 (CET)
  - Summer (DST): UTC+2 (CEST)
- Postal code: 22304 Radučić
- Area code: (+385) 059
- Vehicle registration: ŠI

Radučić (Serbian Cyrillic: Радучић) is a village in Šibenik-Knin County, Croatia. It is part of the municipality of Ervenik.
