= Mira Bjedov =

Yugoslav basketball player (born 1955)

Personal information
- Born: 7 September 1955 (age 71) Mokro Polje, PR Croatia, FPR Yugoslavia
- Listed height: 1.92 m (6 ft 4 in)
- Listed weight: 77 kg (170 lb)
- Position: Center

Career history
- Monting Zagreb
Medals
Women's basketball
Representing Yugoslavia
Olympic Games
| Bronze medal – third place | 1980 Moskva | Team competition |

Mira Bjedov (married name Nikolić; born 7 September 1955 in Mokro Polje) is a Yugoslav former basketball player who competed for Yugoslavia in the 1980 Summer Olympics.
