= Ervenik =

Ervenik Ервеник (Serbian)
- Municipality
- Općina Ervenik; Општина Ервеник; Municipality of Ervenik
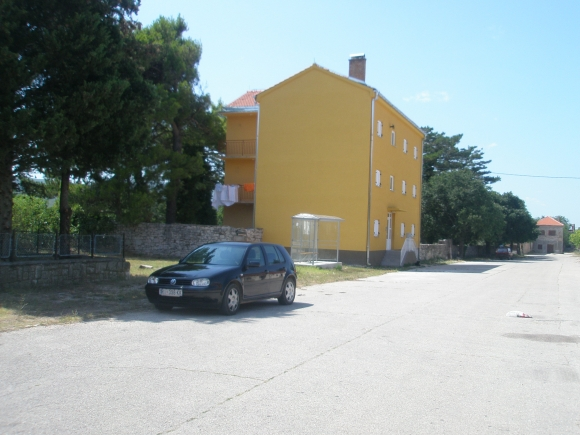
- Interactive map of Ervenik
- Location of Ervenik within Croatia
- Coordinates: 44.107684°N 15.939871°E
- Country: Croatia
- Region: Dalmatia (Dalmatian Hinterland)
- County: Šibenik-Knin County

Government
  - Mayor: Predrag Burza (SDSS)

Area
  - Municipality: 212.8 km^{2} (82.2 sq mi)
  - Urban: 91.3 km^{2} (35.3 sq mi)

Population (2021)
  - Municipality: 789
  - Density: 3.71/km^{2} (9.60/sq mi)
  - Urban: 227
  - Urban density: 2.49/km^{2} (6.44/sq mi)
- Time zone: UTC+1 (CET)
- Postal code: 22300 Knin
- Website: ervenik.hr

Ervenik (Serbian Cyrillic: Ервеник) is a village and municipality in Šibenik-Knin County, Croatia. There were 826 inhabitants (municipality) in 2021, and 97.19% of the population were Serbs, making Ervenik the municipality with the highest percentage of Serbs in Croatia. Population of the village was 243.

== History ==
In 1636 the village was settled by Roman Catholics (Croats), who after the Cretan War (1645–1669) would be reduced to 7 families by 1697, steadily replaced by Serb Orthodox population. In 1928 and 1947 lived 79 and 47 Roman Catholic families respectively, but by 1987 were again reduced to only 7 families.

== Culture and monuments ==
There are two churches in the village:

- Catholic Church of St. Michael the Archangel outside the village (first mentioned in 1402).
- Orthodox Church of St. Nicholas in the center of the village, according to Nikodim Milaš was built between 1669 and 1682, but by architectural characteristics is evidently that the Orthodox church was founded by renovation of a medieval Gothic Roman Catholic church.

Also, in the vicinity of Mokro Polje (and Ervenik), there are remains of the aristocratic Keglević fort (Kegaljgrad), which was first mentioned in documents in 1433.

== Demographics ==
In 2021, the municipality had 789 residents in the following 5 settlements:

- Ervenik, population 227
- Mokro Polje, population 163
- Oton, population 102
- Pađene, population 101
- Radučić, population 196

=== Ervenik Municipality ===
Population by census
1857	1869	1880	1890	1900	1910	1921	1931	1948	1953	1961	1971	1981	1991	2001	2011	2021
4,874	5,222	5,224	5,835	6,511	7,059	6,518	7,331	6,848	6,945	6,694	5,710	4,836	4,115	988	1,105	826

Ervenik: Population trends 1857–2021
v

population	4874	5222	5224	5835	6511	7059	6518	7331	6848	6945	6694	5710	4836	4115	988	1105	789
	1857	1869	1880	1890	1900	1910	1921	1931	1948	1953	1961	1971	1981	1991	2001	2011	2021

Note:Formed from part of the pre-war municipality of Knin Sources: Croatian Bureau of Statistics publications

=== Ervenik (village) ===
Population by census
1857	1869	1880	1890	1900	1910	1921	1931	1948	1953	1961	1971	1981	1991	2001	2011	2021
2,080	2,129	2,123	2,337	2,466	2,788	2,467	2,829	2,318	2,331	2,397	2,056	1,827	1,570	227	287	243

Note: From 1857 until 1961 the village of Ervenik was listed as two separate inhabited places, Donji Ervenik and Gornji Ervenik. The population from those years is the sum of the two villages.

== Language ==
Serbian and Croatian are co-official at the municipal level in Ervenik. As of 2023, most of the legal requirements for the fulfillment of bilingual standards have not been carried out. Official buildings do have Cyrillic signage, but not street signs, traffic signs or seals. Cyrillic is not used on any official documents, nor are there public legal and administrative employees proficient in the script. Preserving traditional Serbian place names and assigning street names to Serbian historical figures is legally mandated and carried out.

== Notable people ==
- Ljubomir Travica
