= Malovan =

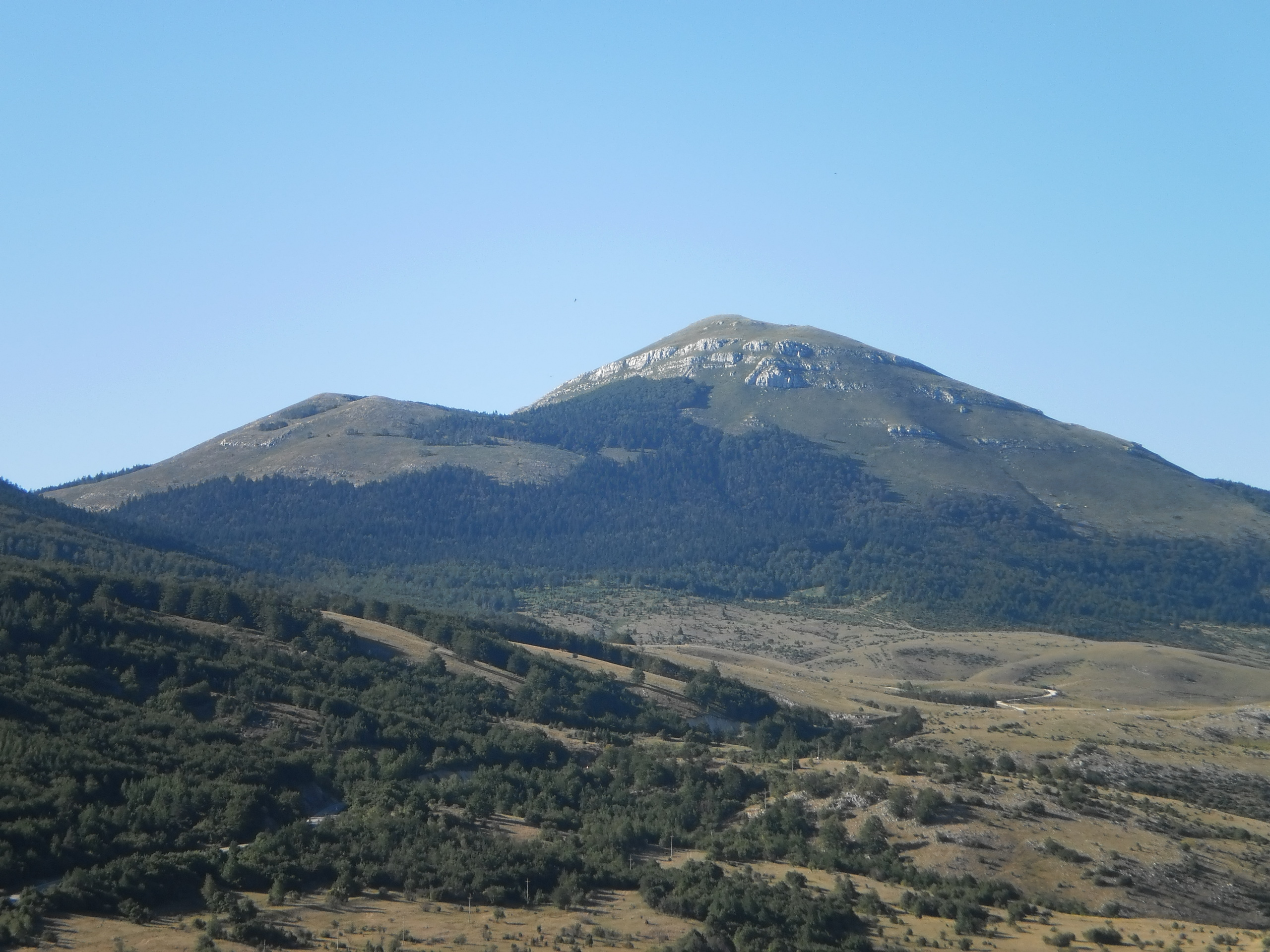
- View of Malovan mountain.

Highest point
- Elevation: 1,826 m (5,991 ft)
- Coordinates: 43°54′56.98″N 17°10′35″E

Geography
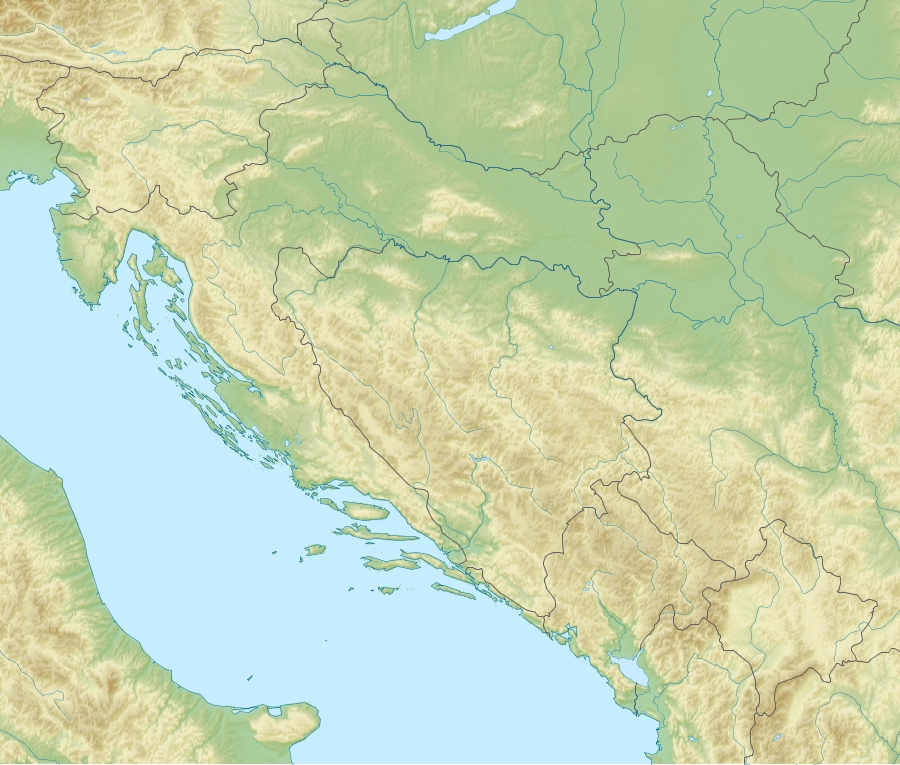
- Location within Dinaric Alps Location within Bosnia and Herzegovina
- Location: Bosnia and Herzegovina
- Parent range: Dinaric Alps

Malovan (Serbian Cyrillic: Малован) is a mountain in the municipality of Kupres, Bosnia and Herzegovina. It has an altitude of 1,826 metres (5,991 ft).

== See also ==
- List of mountains in Bosnia and Herzegovina
