= Cerovac, Zadar County =

Cerovac Церовац (Serbian)
- Village
- Location within Croatia
- Coordinates: 44°13′27″N 16°00′56″E
- Country: Croatia
- County: Zadar County
- Municipality: Gračac

Area
  - Total: 20.8 km^{2} (8.0 sq mi)
- Elevation: 684 m (2,244 ft)

Population (2021)
  - Total: 2
  - Density: 0.096/km^{2} (0.25/sq mi)
- Time zone: UTC+1 (CET)
  - Summer (DST): UTC+2 (CEST)
- Postal code: 23440 Gračac
- Area code: +385 (23)

Cerovac (Serbian Cyrillic: Церовац) is a village in Croatia.

== Population ==
According to the 2011 census, Cerovac had 3 inhabitants.

Population
1857	1869	1880	1890	1900	1910	1921	1931	1948	1953	1961	1971	1981	1991	2001	2011
0	0	87	211	297	343	392	342	296	302	268	158	63	36	5	3

Napomena: Formed as independent settlement in 1880. From 1953 its name is Cerovac. The census period 1880–1948 includes data for the former settlement of Gornji Cerovci. In the census period 1857–1880 part of the data is included in the settlement of Zrmanja Vrelo.

=== 1991 census ===
According to the 1991 census, settlement of Cerovac had 36 inhabitants, which were ethnically declared as:

Cerovac
1991
total: 36
1. Serbs 31 (86.1%)
2. Yugoslavs 3 (8.33%)
3. Croats 2 (5.55%)

=== Austro-hungarian 1910 census ===
According to the 1910 census, settlement of Cerovac had 343 inhabitants in 5 hamlets, which were linguistically and religiously declared as:

Population by language	Croatian or Serbian
Donji Cerovci	63
Gornji Cerovci	163
Paripova Draga	14
Smrdljivac	87
Krstače Zrmanjske	16
Total	343 (100%)

Population by religion	Eastern Orthodox
Donji Cerovci	63
Gornji Cerovci	163
Paripova Draga	14
Smrdljivac	87
Krstače Zrmanjske	16
Total	343 (100%)

== Literature ==
- Savezni zavod za statistiku i evidenciju FNRJ i SFRJ, popis stanovništva 1948, 1953, 1961, 1971, 1981. i 1991. godine.
- Knjiga: "Narodnosni i vjerski sastav stanovništva Hrvatske, 1880–1991: po naseljima, author: Jakov Gelo, izdavač: Državni zavod za statistiku Republike Hrvatske, 1998., ISBN 953-6667-07-X, ISBN 978-953-6667-07-9;
