= Komatsu Imai =

Japanese aviation pioneer and essayist (1899–1984)

Komatsu Imai (今井 小松, Imai Komatsu; 13 August 1899 – 19 March 1984) was the second woman aviator in Japan and an essayist with the alias 雲井龍子 (Ryūko Kumoi). She is said to be one of the models for the heroine in the asadora Kumono jūtan (ja), broadcast by the Japan Broadcasting Corporation.

== Aviator ==
Komatsu Imai was born in Kyoto and trained at Fukunaga Airplane Institute in Shizuoka Prefecture. She was licensed a second class aviator in 1927. She had an episode to maneuver acrobatics above 216 m high Kunōzan.

She was an essayist and a novelist who wrote on aviation with the alias Tatsuko Kumoi, literary meaning "Dragon Daughter of Clouds".

== A politician's wife ==
Her husband was Kamezō Nishihara, whom she married in 1937. He was the mastermind in politics, especially regarded as the right hand of Prime Minister Masatake Terauchi (9 October 1916 – 29 September 1918). Kamezō accomplished Nishihara Loans, a series of loans that the Japanese government arranged between January 1917 and September 1918 and persuaded warlord Duan Qirui to favor Japanese interests in Anhui Province, China. In 1938, Komatsu Nishihara moved with her husband to his hometown of Fukuchiyama in Kyoto Prefecture, where he was the head of Kumobara village for 13 years.

Komatsu Nishihara became Chairman of the Japan Ladies' Aviators Association (now Japan Women's Aviators Association) in 1955 after her husband died in 1954 at the age of 81. She died at Miyazu, Kyoto in 1984. When invited to a flight to commemorate her, heirs on board said they might have felt sorry if it was fine, thinking about Komatsu's alias.

== See also ==
- Hyōdō Tadashi
- Kiku Nishizaki
- Park Kyung-won
- Shigeno Kibe
- Yae Nozoki

== Bibliography ==
- Kumoi, Tatsuko (1922). "純日本製飛行機羽衣號の構造" [The structure of Hagoromo, the all domestic airplane]. 飛行 Hikō. Vol. 3, no. 3. Magazine Printing Office, Imperial Aviation Society. pp. 24–28.
- Kumoi, Tatsuko (1922). "尾島よいとこ (飛行場生活)" [Ojima is a nice place (life at the airport)]. 飛行 Hikō. Vol. 3, no. 5. Magazine Printing Office, Imperial Aviation Society. pp. 71–75.
- Kumoi, Tatsuko (1922). "その前夜 (小說)" [novel―the night before]. 飛行 Hikō. Vol. 3, no. 9. Magazine Printing Office, Imperial Aviation Society. pp. 68–73.
- Eshima, Himpa (1922). "ある日の石橋勝浪 雲井龍子の君に 阿部蒼天先生に" [One day for Shōrō Ishibashi, dedicated to Tatsuko Kumoi and Mr. Soten Abe]. 自動車及交通運輸 (Automobile and Transportation). 帝国自動車保護協会 Teikoku jidōsha hogo kyōkai. p. 39.
- "女流飛行家・雲井龍子" [Tatsuko Kumoi, a woman aviator]. 静岡県の昭和史 : 近代百年の記録 (Shizuokaken no shōwashi: kindai hyakunen no kiroku). Mainichi Shinbun. 1983. p. 214.
