= Belgrade City Library =

Public library in Belgrade, Serbia

- Библиотека града Београда
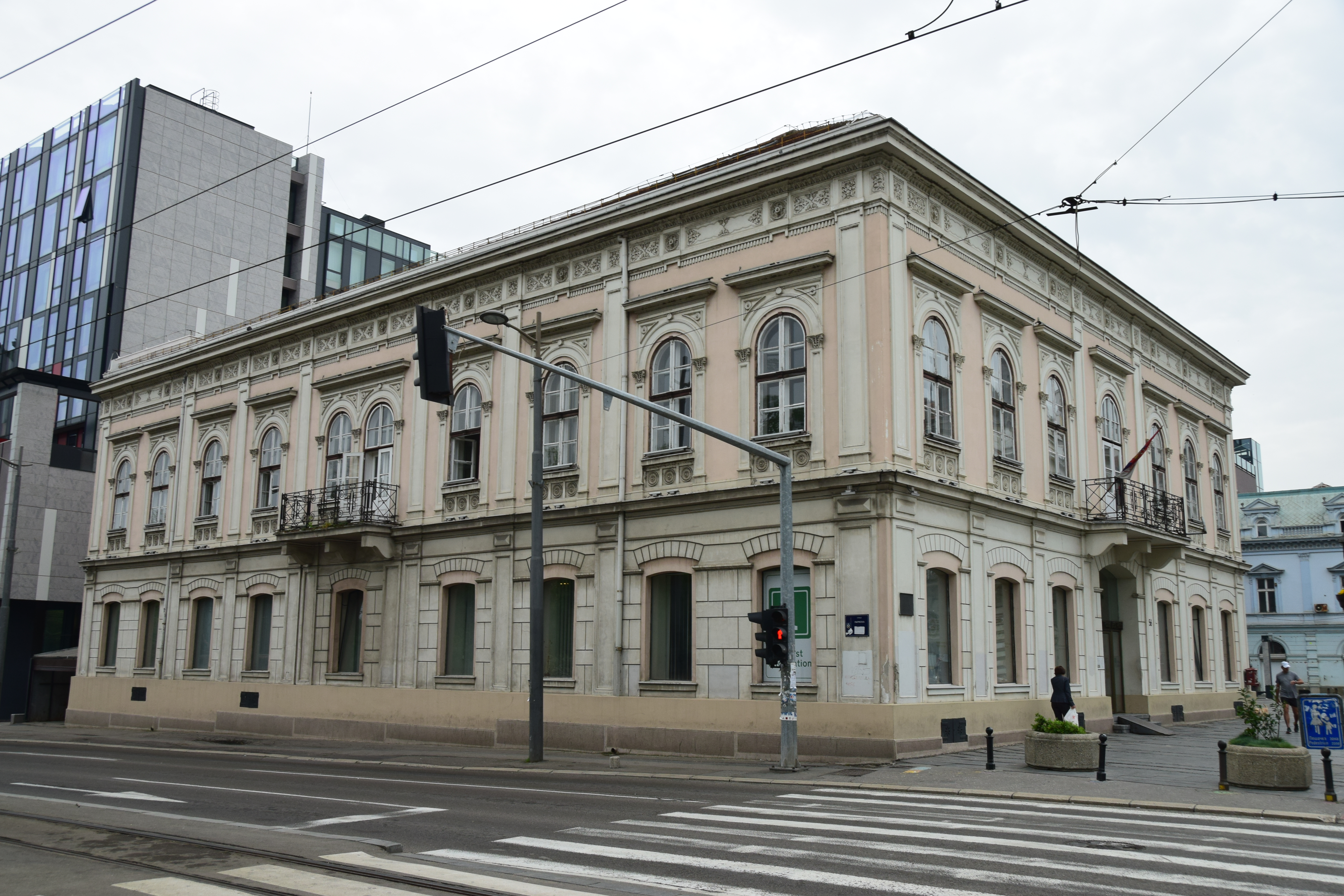
- Belgrade City Library, view from Kalemegdan
- Location within Belgrade
- 44°49′12.54″N 20°27′12.312″E
- Location: Belgrade, Serbia
- Type: Public Library
- Established: 1931; 95 years ago

Collection
- Items collected: books, newspapers, magazines, sound and music recordings, databases, maps, prints, drawings and manuscripts
- Size: 1,5 M items (approx.)

Other information
- Director: Jasmina Ninkov
- Website: www.bgb.rs

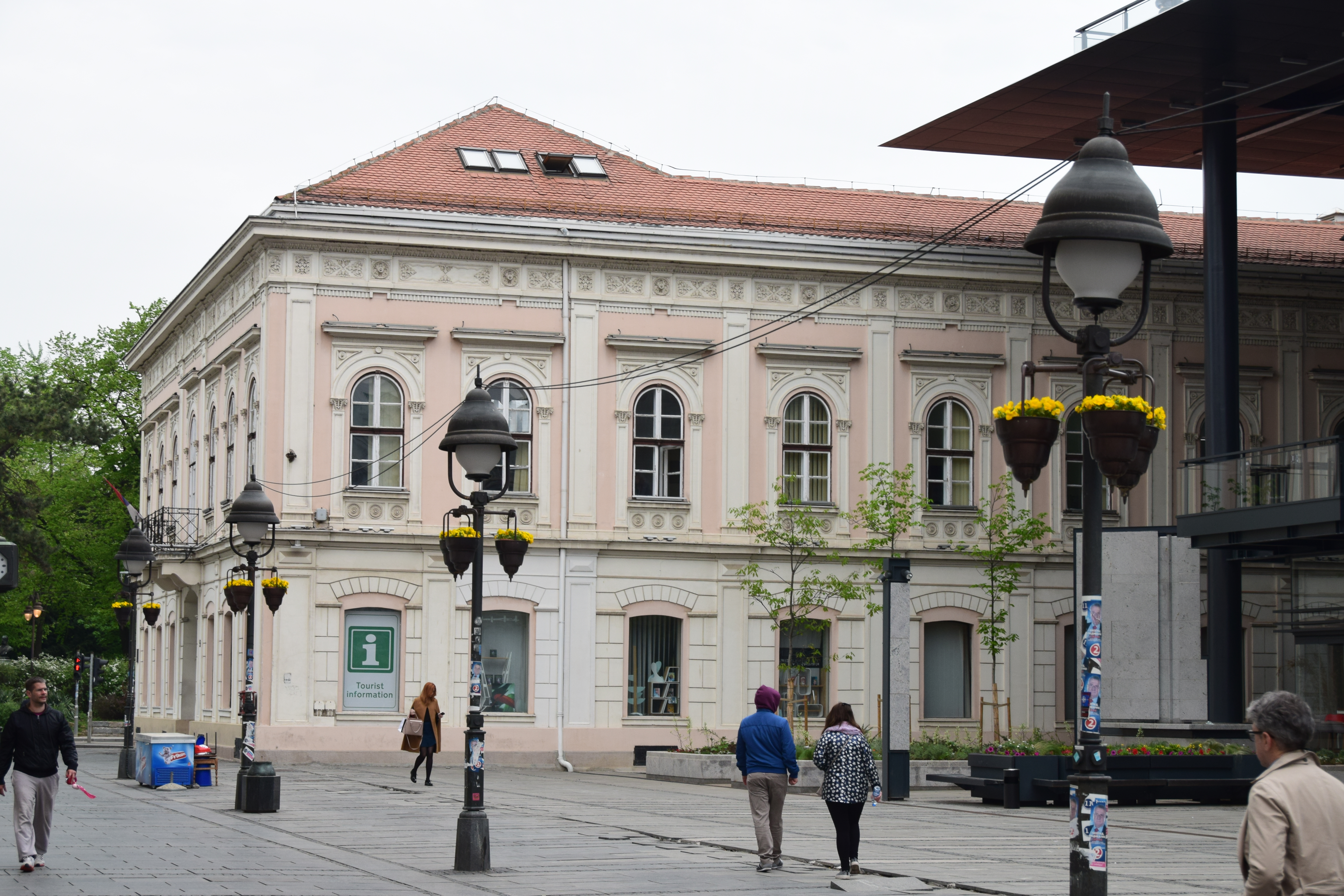
Belgrade City Library, view from Knez Mihailova Street

Belgrade City Library (Serbian: Библиотека града Београда, romanized: Biblioteka grada Beograda (BGB)) is a public library in Belgrade, the capital of Serbia. It is a parent library for more than a dozen municipal libraries and their branches. It is also the largest lending library in Serbia. It is located in the center of the city, in the pedestrian zone of Knez Mihailova Street, next to the shopping mall.

Belgrade City Library was founded in 1931. In 1989, the majority of municipal libraries in the territory of the City of Belgrade decided to unite and form a single network of libraries. Presently, Belgrade City Library comprises 13 municipal libraries operating in the territory of the City of Belgrade. Headquarters are located at 56 Knez Mihailova Street, in an edifice known as Serbian Crown, a cultural monument that was given the status of immovable cultural property in 1981.

The overall size of Belgrade City Library holdings exceeds 1,500,000 items. Library operates approximately 70 facilities, covering an area of 13,000 square meters, and has more than 140,000 users. It is a partner in the most important European cultural projects.

== Organisational structure ==
Belgrade City Library is divided into these organisational units:

- Belgrade City Library;
- Thirteen libraries in urban municipalities and their branch libraries.

=== Special Collections Department ===
Special collections department comprises the Periodicals Collection, the Old and Rare Books and Books about Belgrade Collection and the Children's Collection. Presently, the Department for Old and Rare Books and Books on Belgrade holds more than 20.000 titles.

=== Children's Department ===
Children's Department has been in existence since the foundation of Belgrade City Library in 1931. Today, there is one operational children's department, namely "Čika Jova Zmaj" ("Uncle Jova Zmaj", named after a children's poet Jovan Jovanović Zmaj), with holdings comprising around 30,000 items. The department enrolled approximately 3,000 users last year. Neven Children's Department is expected to reopen in the near future, although that is not known for certain.

The Department has been implementing a variety of programmes and actively working with children. "Secret" was the title of a project run by "Čika Jova Zmaj" Children's Department that was awarded first prize at the 2009 Biblionet as the best library project in Serbia 2006–2009. Another project, "Book is a Picture Gallery", was presented at the 75th IFLA Congress in Milan as a poster session.

In addition, two municipal libraries ("Đorđe Jovanović" in Stari Grad and "Ilija Garašanin" in Grocka) have their own special children's departments and implement a variety of programmes.

=== Municipal libraries in the Belgrade City Library network ===
1. "Jovan Dučić" Library, Barajevo (named after a poet-diplomat Jovan Dučić)
2. "Dositej Obradović" Library, Voždovac (named after a writer, philosopher, and the first minister of education of Serbia Dositej Obradović)
3. "Petar Kočić" Library, Vračar (named after a writer Petar Kočić)
4. "Ilija Garašanin" Library, Grocka (named after a statesman Ilija Garašanin)
5. "Vuk Karadžić" Library, Zvezdara (named after a major reformer of the Serbian language Vuk Karadžić)
6. "Sveti Sava" Library, Zemun (named a Serbian prince and Orthodox monk, the first Archbishop of the autocephalous Serbian Church Saint Sava)
7. "Despot Stefan Lazarevic" Library, Mladenovac (named after Serbian Prince Stefan Lazarević)
8. "Vuk Karadžić" Library, New Belgrade
9. "Miodrag Bulatović" Library, Rakovica (named after a writer Miodrag Bulatović)
10. "Isidora Sekulić" Library, Savski Venac (named after a writer Isidora Sekulić)
11. "Milovan Vidaković" Library, Sopot (named after a novelist Milovan Vidaković)
12. "Đorđe Jovanović" Library, Stari Grad (named after a writer Đorđe Jovanović)
13. "Laza Kostić" Library, Čukarica (named after a poet Laza Kostić)

== History ==
Marija Ilić Agapova

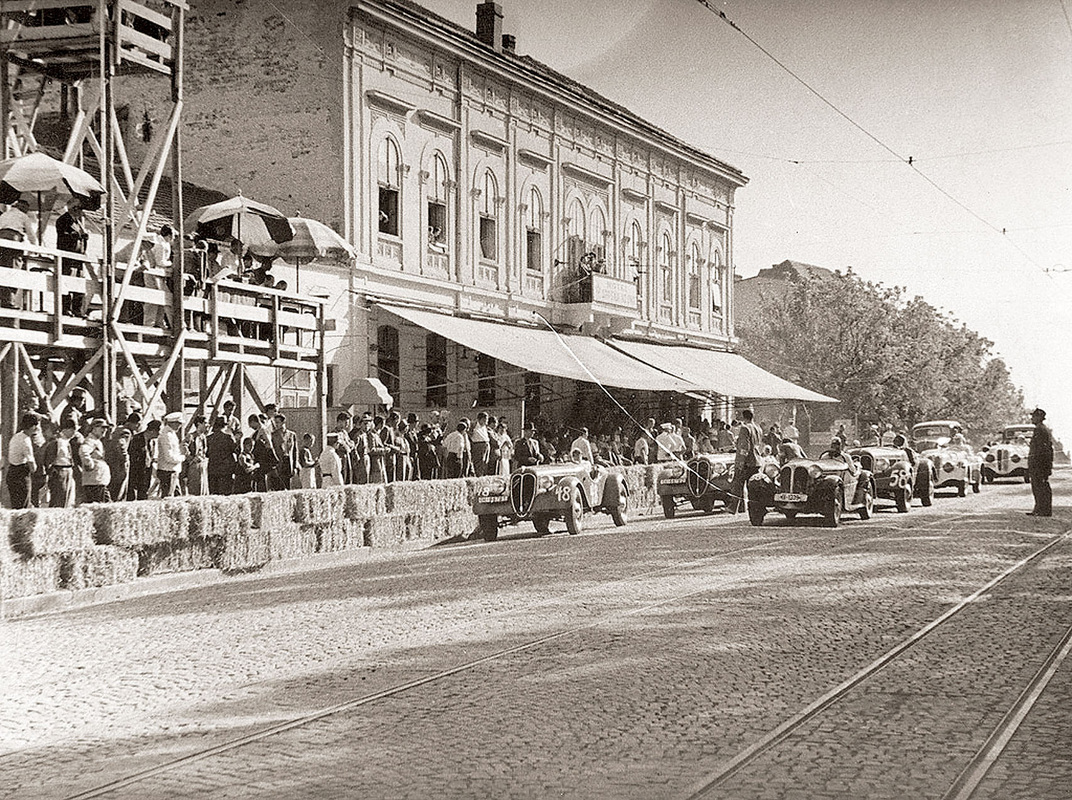
Start of a Belgrade Grand Prix in front of the building of hotel "Serbian crown" (1939)

Ever since Belgrade had become the capital of the Principality of Serbia, its municipal authorities had been facing growing demands for building a People's House to accommodate a library and reading room. Before World War I, Belgrade Town Hall Building had a professional library on its premises. The library comprised a single room and was used for official purposes of the municipality. On October 24, 1930, a decision was passed to establish a municipal library and a museum. Marija Ilić Agapova, PhD was appointed librarian and two years later, she was promoted to librarian-administrator.

On January 11, 1931, when the library opened its doors, Belgrade got a modern urban library. Following the example of other European libraries of the day, books were classified and arranged according to the principles of the Universal Decimal Classification and training courses for librarians were run for the first time. In the same year, the Kingdom of Yugoslavia saw the opening of its first Children's Reading Room. The library was open to the general public and anybody could use its resources. Books could be borrowed with an ID card (a library card) and were lent out free of charge. Library cards for children were embellished with an illustration by Beta Vukanović and were inscribed with an excerpt from the 1924 Geneva Declaration of the Rights of the Child.

The 1941 German Bombing of Belgrade caused untold damage to the library, reducing the building to rubble and destroying invaluable cultural heritage. As a result of Nazi firebomb raids, the roof of the building that used to house the library at the time was destroyed by the flames, along with its last floor. The Children's Library was in operation throughout the war and library services became available to other users as well in early 1943. After World War II, the library started regular operation on January 18, 1945. Library holdings increased from 20,000 units at the end of the war to 39,813 in 1948.

Until 1953, the Belgrade City Library did not have a complex internal structure. Then, divisions were set up in 1954 and the Library Centre was established in 1955. The goal was to create a single network of public libraries across municipalities. Under the provisions of the Libraries Act, the Belgrade City Library has been designated parent library for libraries operating in the territory of the City of Belgrade since 1961. In October 1986, Library moved into new premises, the building of the former Serbian Crown Hotel located at 56 Knez Mihailova Street, where it is still situated. Serbian poet Desanka Maksimović opened the new building of Belgrade City Library at an official ceremony. The Belgrade City Library was the first public lending library in which cataloguing was computerized in the Socialist Federal Republic of Yugoslavia.

Following a referendum held on 9 January 1989, employees of 12 out of 16 municipal libraries (joined by an additional two afterwards) voted in favor of integration, turning Belgrade City Library into a single network of libraries.

== Headquarters ==
Belgrade City Library headquarters are located in a building that used to be a hotel called Serbian Crown, a cultural monument granted the status of immovable cultural property in 1981. On the premises of headquarters, there are, in addition to the circulation desk, two reading rooms, the book storage and administrative premises, the Roman Hall, Atrium Gallery, Vuk's Hall and the Art Department's Reading Room.

== Serbian Crown building ==
The building in which Belgrade City Library is presently situated was once Serbian Crown Hotel built around 1867 as the most modern, emblematic and best-furnished hotel in Belgrade at the time. In the history of Belgrade's architecture, the building of Serbian Crown Hotel marked the beginning of a vigorous process of Europeanisation of the city in the latter half of the 19th century. The architecture of the building is typical of the eclecticism of the late 1800s, incorporating a mixture of the Renaissance and other previous historical styles. It is not known who was the architect who designed the building. In 1986, the edifice was remodelled to accommodate Belgrade City Library. The building has preserved its original appearance to this day. In the same year building was reconstructed for the purposes of Belgrade City Library and has maintained its original appearance.

== Roman Hall ==
The Roman Hall is a unique venue with an in situ archaeological site and a lapidarium displaying exhibits such as statues, altars, stelae and other 2nd to 4th-century AD stone sculptures and ceramics originating from the Singidunum area and the Danube Basin in the Roman province of Upper Moesia.

During the 1983-1986 renovation of the building, remains of an even older structure were discovered due to the lowering of the level of the basement floor. Archaeologists found that the remains were actually parts of ramparts foundation and a main gate tower of a Roman fort located in the Upper Town of Belgrade Fortress. As a result of that important discovery, modifications had been made to the design and the Library got the Roman Hall intended for staging public events instead of a book depository.

== Atrium Gallery ==
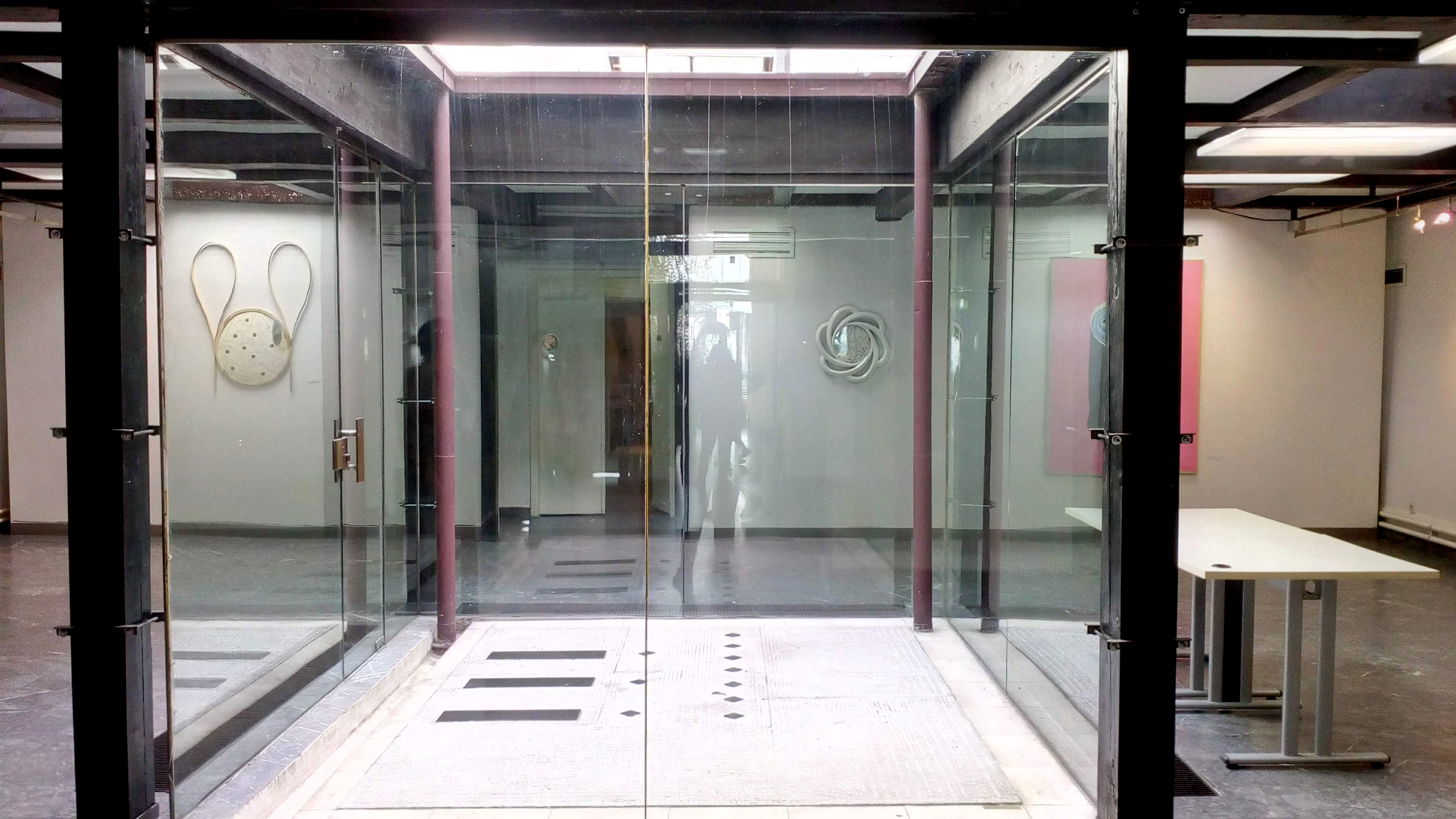
Atrium Gallery

The library building has a rectangular base and is structured around an inner courtyard that was mostly covered with a roof and turned into an exhibition venue during the renovation of 1986. The central part of the gallery venue features a mosaic floor known as the Prizren Mosaic, a unique work of art created by the artist Aleksandar Tomašević.

The Atrium Gallery opened in 1987. It hosts both collective and solo exhibitions of works of fine art by renowned international and national artists. In addition to fine arts exhibitions, the Gallery organizes literary and anniversary exhibitions.

Many famous artists have exhibited their works in the Gallery, such as Milan Konjović, Olja Ivanjicki, Vasa Pomorišac, Jugoslav Vlahović, Milan Stašević, Slobodan Sotirov, Cvetko Lainović, Petar Omčikus, Ljuba Popović, Milorad Bata Mihailović, Radomir Reljić, Milan Cile Marinković, and Vladimir Veličković.

== Vuk's Hall ==
Vuk's Hall is located on the first floor of the Library. It is an actual gallery that exhibits paintings depicting Belgrade. It has been named after its central painting, a portrait of Vuk Karadzic done by Beta Vukanović. The Hall is presently used to host press conferences, seminars, lectures and similar events.

== See also ==
- National Library of Serbia
- Belgrade University Library
- List of libraries in Serbia
