= Oton, Croatia =

Oton Отон (Serbian)
- Settlement
- Location of Oton in Croatia.
- Coordinates: 44°06′05″N 16°06′40″E
- Country: Croatia
- County: Šibenik-Knin
- Municipality: Ervenik

Area
  - Total: 19.3 km^{2} (7.5 sq mi)
- Elevation: 422 m (1,385 ft)

Population (2021)
  - Total: 102
  - Density: 5.28/km^{2} (13.7/sq mi)
- Time zone: UTC+1 (CET)
  - Summer (DST): UTC+2 (CEST)
- Postal code: 22318 Pađene
- Area code: 022
- Vehicle registration: ŠI

Oton (Serbian Cyrillic: Отон) is a village in Šibenik-Knin County, Croatia. It is part of the municipality of Ervenik.

== Geography ==
Oton is located 9 kilometers northwest of the city of Knin. It is scattered across a wide area between the canyon of Zrmanja river on the west and Radljevac river on the east. To the south, the border of the village is Debelo Brdo. The settlement is divided into Oton Polje and Oton Brdo according to its geographical characteristics and the altitude of its hamlets. The villages of Bender and Kobilice also belong to the Oton region.

Oton Polje consists of the following hamlets: Dobrijevići, Karanovići, Kneževići, Mišljeni, and Vujnovići; meanwhile Oton Brdo consists of the following hamlets: Atlije, Karne, Kneževići, Kovačevići, Opačići, Sudari, Rastovići, Višekrune and Žunići. Bender consists of hamlets: Dobrijevići, Čupkovići, Pašići, and Runjajići.

== History ==
=== Pre-1600 ===
The beginnings of settlement in the area of what is now Oton, dates back to prehistoric times, with the earliest cultural remains dating to the Neolithic period. The oldest person connected to the village was Publius Aedius Andes, son of Barcin, who erected an altar in the 2nd century.

=== Ottoman period ===
During Ottoman rule, the Oton region was part of the Plavno nahiyah (district), which was recorded in Ottoman census registers from 1530. Following the Morean War, the area became part of the border region between the Venetian Republic, Habsburg Monarchy, and the Ottoman Empire. After the Treaty of Karlowitz in 1699, a stone cairn was erected on Međijak peak at Debelo Brdo to mark the tripoint border between the three empires.

=== Modern period ===
From the breakup of Yugoslavia until August 1995, Oton was in the Republic of Serbian Krajina. Until the territorial reorganization in Croatia, the settlement was part of the former large municipality of Knin.

== Culture ==
In the region, there is a temple of the Serbian Orthodox Church of St. Elijah, built in 1702, which features both Romanesque and Gothic architecture. The temple still stands today as the current main church of Oton.

== Surnames ==
The following surnames originated from Oton. Each family line celebrates a hereditary Slava or family's patron saint's feast day:

- Atlija – Orthodox-based, celebrates St. Nicholas;
- Bjelotomić – Orthodox-based, celebrates St. Nicholas;
- Čupković – Orthodox-based, celebrates St. George;
- Devrnja – Orthodox-based, celebrates St. George;
- Dobrijević – Orthodox-based, celebrates St. Stephen and St. George:
- Karna – Orthodox-based, celebrates St. Michael;
- Knežević – Orthodox-based, celebrates St. Nicholas;
- Kovačević – Orthodox-based, celebrates St. Stephen;
- Opačić – Orthodox-based, celebrates St. Peter;
- Pašić – Orthodox-based, celebrates St. Stephen;
- Popović – Orthodox-based, celebrates St. George;
- Radan – Orthodox-based, celebrates St. Stephen;
- Rastović – Orthodox-based, celebrates St. Jovan;
- Sudar – Orthodox-based, celebrates St. Cosmas and Damian;
- Višekruna – Orthodox-based, celebrates St. Jovan;
- Vujnović – Orthodox-based, celebrates St. Arandjela;
- Vujinović – Orthodox-based, celebrates St. Nicholas; and
- Žunić – Orthodox-based, celebrates St. George.
