= Pađene =

Pađene Пађене (Serbian)
- Village
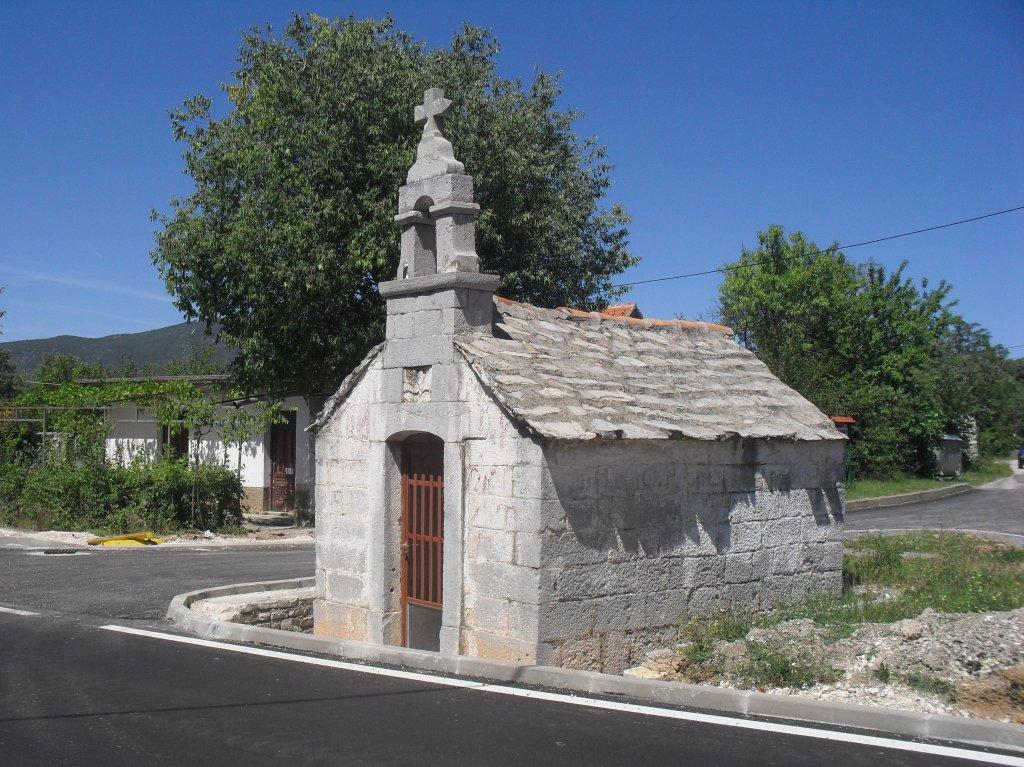
- Eastern Orthodox chapel

- Location within Croatia
- Coordinates: 44°05′16″N 16°05′53″E
- Country: Croatia
- County: Šibenik-Knin County
- Municipality: Ervenik

Area
  - Total: 18.1 km^{2} (7.0 sq mi)
- Elevation: 342 m (1,122 ft)

Population (2021)
  - Total: 101
  - Density: 5.58/km^{2} (14.5/sq mi)
- Time zone: UTC+1 (CET)
  - Summer (DST): UTC+2 (CEST)
- Postal code: 22318
- Area code: 022

Pađene (Serbian Cyrillic: Пађене) is a village in the Šibenik-Knin County, Croatia. The settlement is administered as a part of Ervenik municipality.

== Location ==
It is located in Zagora, 12 kilometers from Knin, on the state road D1.

== Population ==
According to national census of 2011, population of the settlement is 175. The majority of the population are Serbs. In 1991, 99% of the population was Serb.

== Gallery ==
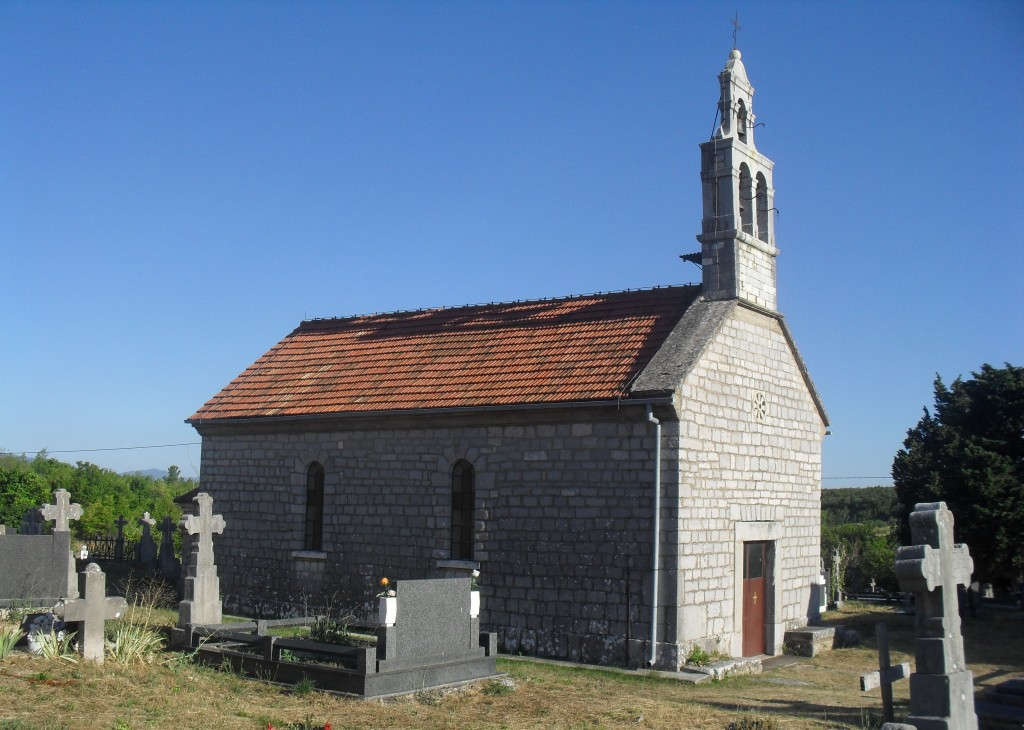
Orthodox church

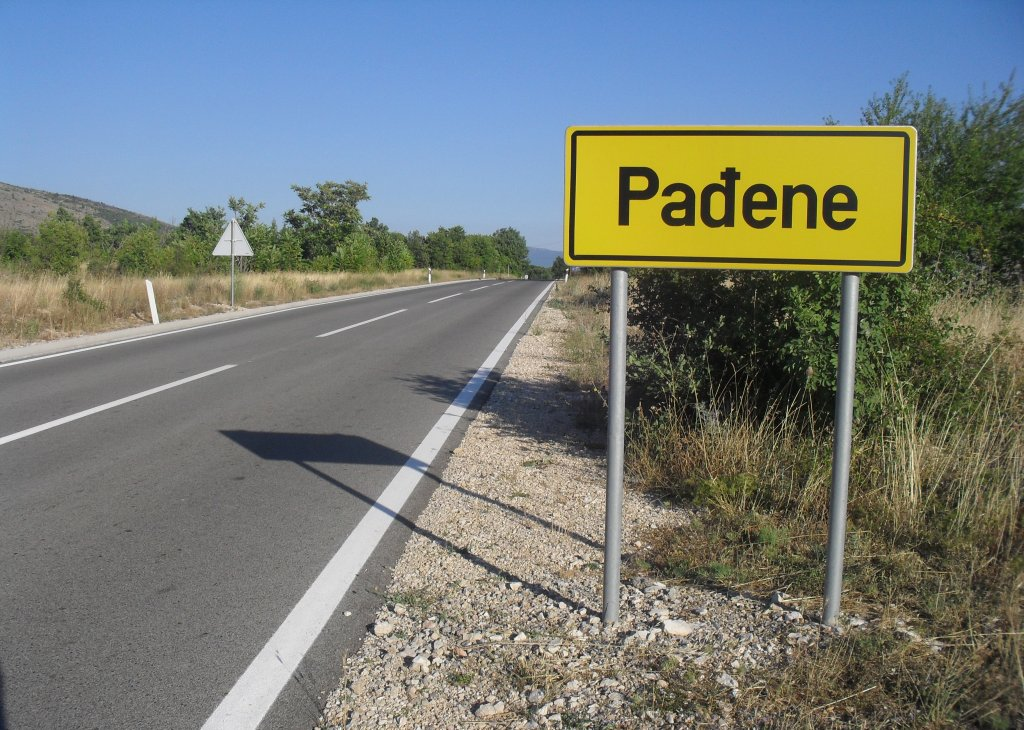
Traffic sign at the village entrance

== Notable individuals ==
- Marija Ilić Agapova
