= Marija Ilić Agapova =

Serbian Jurist

- Born: 14 August 1895; Pađene, Kingdom of Dalmatia, Austria-Hungary
- Died: 13 March 1984 (aged 88); Belgrade, SR Serbia, SFR Yugoslavia
- Occupations: Translator, jurist, librarian

Marija Ilić Agapova (14 August 1895 – 13 March 1984) was a Serbian jurist, translator, librarian, civil rights activist and the first director of the Belgrade City Library.

== Biography ==
Marija Ilić was born in the village Pađene near Knin in 1895. She was one of the first educated Serbian women in the region. She attended the Institute of empress Maria at Montenegrin court in Cetinje in Russian (1908-1913). She graduated from a real gymnasium and started attending Law school in Zagreb in 1918.

She received her Ph.D. from the Law school at the University of Zagreb in 1923. She received a Middle-European Ph.D. just like Ivo Andrić and other intellectuals of that time who studied in Austro-Hungary, Germany and Italy. She began practicing law in 1926.

She was also engaged in librarianship and museology in 1929 as a correspondent of the County Library in Belgrade and participated in the founding of the Belgrade City Museum and organized try-outs for the new Coat of arms of Belgrade.

To commemorate the 125th anniversary of Belgrade's liberation from the Turks, she wrote a collection of stories for children about the town's history, and from her efforts, the "Illustrated History of Belgrade" came to exist.

She governed the Library from 1932, and also the City Museum from 1941. She organized collecting of the materials that served as a basis for the founding of the Belgrade Historical Archive. Immediately after the Belgrade liberation she was fired because she kept working and governing the cultural institutions of the city during the German occupation (1941-1944), and was retired in 1947. After the retirement, she translated and taught Russian and Italian. She continued translating Russian and Italian and worked part-time as a foreign languages professor in the College of Diplomatic and Journalistic Vocational Studies, and also taught courses of archivists. She was a member of the Association of Serbian Literary Translators and a Women's movement activist. She wrote many works regarding women's rights.

She was honoured with a plaque from the City Museum in Belgrade in 1965.

She died in 1984 in Belgrade.

== Legacy ==
The family archive of Marija Ilić-Agapova and Maksim Agapov (1922–1973) is preserved by the State Archives of Serbia.

== Marija Ilić Agapova Award ==
Marija Ilić Agapova Award was established in 2001. and named after the first director of the Belgrade City Library. Belgrade City Library grants this award to the best librarian of Belgrade each year on January 11, The Belgrade City Library Day.

== Sources ==
- Dereta : Marija Ilić Agapova
- Tromeđa : Marija Ilić Agapova
- Marija Ilić Agapova - knjiga joj je bila i štit i oružje („Večernje novosti“, March, 24th 2015)
