= Croatian diaspora =

Croats, their descendants, and Croatian citizens outside Croatia

Croatian diaspora Hrvatsko iseljeništvo

Total population
- c. 4 million worldwide

Regions with significant populations
- United States: c. 1.2 million
- Bosnia and Herzegovina: c. 544,780
- Germany: c. 500,000
- Chile: c. 400,000
- Argentina: c. 250,000
- Peru: c. 190,000-250,000
- Australia: c. 164,360
- Austria: c. 150,719

Religion
- Historically Roman Catholic

Related ethnic groups
- European diaspora

The Croatian diaspora (Croatian: Hrvatsko iseljeništvo or Hrvatsko rasuće) consists of ethnic Croat people, their descendants, and Croatian citizens living outside of Croatia. An excess of four million people are part of the Croatian diaspora. The nationality laws of Croatia affords citizenship by birth, ancestry, and naturalisation, growing the Croatian citizen population living abroad.

Estimates on its size are only approximate because of incomplete statistical records and naturalisation, but upper-level estimates suggest that the Croatian diaspora numbers between a third and a half of the total number of Croats. Within neighboring Southeast Europe, the largest community are with the Croats of Bosnia and Herzegovina, one of the constituent nations of that country, amounting to about 545,000. Outside of these two regions, broader Europe is home to around one million Croatians, with 1.7 million living overseas.

The largest diaspora community is in the United States at 1.2 million Croatian Americans, which significantly influence Croatia–United States relations. In Western Europe, the largest group is found in Germany with a reported 228,000 Croatian Germans as of 2006, with some estimates including naturalized citizens as high as 500,000. There are significant numbers of the diaspora in the Indo-Pacific, mainly in Australia (165,000) and New Zealand (up to 100,000).

== Statistics ==
The global distribution of the Croatian diaspora as measured by population strength. Croatia + 100,000 + 10,000 + 1,000

=== Europe ===
Eastern and Southeastern Europe

- Bosnia and Herzegovina 544,780 (2013)
- Serbia 39,107 (2021)
- Montenegro 6,021 (2011)
- Romania 4,842 (2021)

Western and Central Europe

- Germany 500,000
- Austria 150,719
- Belgium 7,000
- Slovenia 35,642 (2002)
- Ireland 24,000 (2018)
- Switzerland 80,000
- France 40,000
- Hungary 25,730
- Italy 60,000
- United Kingdom 10,000 (2001 UK Census)
- Poland 1,656
- Portugal 464 (Croatian citizens only, excluding people with double citizenship)

Northern Europe

- Sweden 40,000
- Denmark 5,400
- Norway 3,909
- Finland 470 (Croatian citizens)

=== Overseas ===
Africa

- South Africa 8,000

North America

- United States 1,200,000 (2021)
- Canada 133,965

South America

- Argentina 250,000
- Bolivia 5,000
- Brazil 70,000
- Chile 400,000
- Ecuador 4,000
- Paraguay 41,502
- Peru 195,000
- Uruguay 5,000
- Venezuela 5,000

Oceania

- Australia 164,360 (2021)
- New Zealand 2,550 - 100,000 (est.)

== Distribution ==
=== United States ===
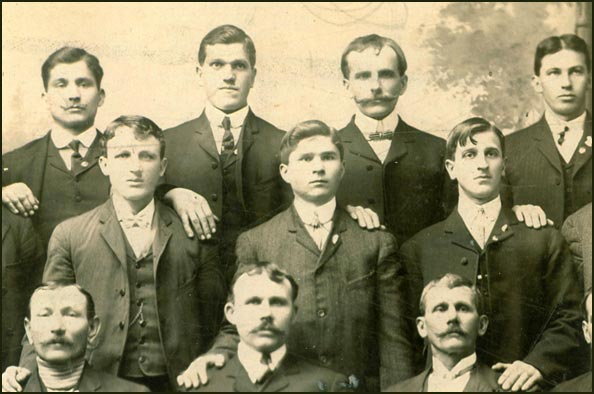
Group of Croatian men in a social club, Joliet, Illinois, 1910

The United States has the largest Croatian diaspora outside of Croatia. Croatians in Detroit first appeared around 1890, settling usually in the region of Russel. Across Lake Erie, Croats formed one of the largest Croatian-American communities in Cleveland, which to this day remains the second largest concentration of Croats in America after Pittsburgh. At one point, the Croatian population in Cleveland rivaled Zagreb, as did the Slovenian and Hungarian populations in Cleveland rivaled Ljubliana and Budapest.

In Illinois the Croatians started concentrating mostly around Chicago. Although it was created a bit later, the Croatian settlement in Chicago became one of the most important ones in the United States. The settlement especially started developing after World War I and Chicago became the center of all Croatian cultural and political activities. It is calculated that there were roughly 50,000 Croats in Chicago in the 1990s, while there were altogether 100,000 Croats living in 54 additional Croatian settlements in Illinois. There is a significant Croat population also in Indianapolis that settled during the Yugoslav Wars of the 1990s. According to the 2005 U.S. Community Survey, there were 401,208 Americans of full or partial Croatian descent.

Pittsburgh has a sizeable Croatian population. The headquarters of the Croatian Fraternal Union (CFU) - the oldest and largest Croatian organization in the United States - is located in the eastern suburb of Monroeville, PA, established in the 1880s. The CFU publishes a weekly newspaper, The Zajednicar Weekly, in both English and Croatian. Most of the Croatians in Pittsburgh originally settled in the early 1900s on the city's North Side. A neighborhood centered on East Ohio Street along the Allegheny River between Millvale and the North Shore was named Mala Jaska after an area in Croatia (northwest of Zagreb).

The broader Croatian American community participate in a variety of bilateral organizations seeking to strengthen the relationship between the U.S. and Croatia. The National Federation of Croatian Americans (NFCACF) was established in 1993 to advance the diaspora within the U.S. while the Association of Croatian American Professionals (ACAP) seeks to enhance joint economic synergy and public policy. Many regional societies and clubs exist in Washington, D.C., New York, California, and the Midwest.

=== Bosnia and Herzegovina ===
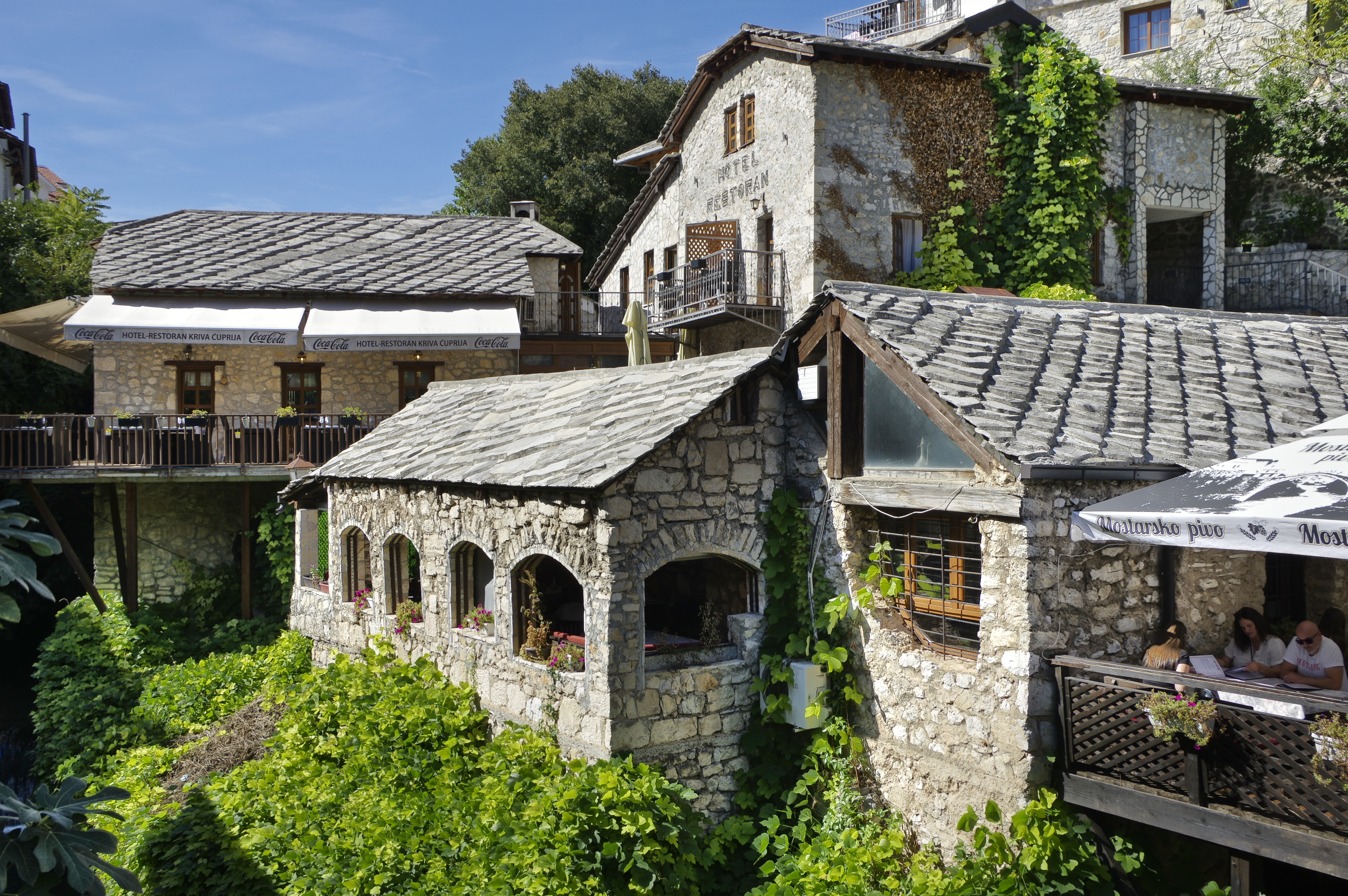
The city of Mostar, home to the majority of the Croats in Bosnia and Herzegovina, in 2024.

The relationship between Croatia's diasporic population and the native Croat of Bosnia and Herzegovina is complex. The Croat community in this region are native to Bosnia and Herzegovina, mostly speaking Croatian and identifying as Catholic. The geographical limits of land occupied by the Croat people and citizens of various Croatian states has changed significantly throughout history. The status of the Croat community within Bosnia and Herzegovina as a "diaspora" as opposed to a simple ethnic dispersion of Croats is debated in modern ethnographic research. Croatian nationality law affords citizenship to anyone living in Bosnia and Herzegovina of Croat descent, allowing for duel citizenship as well. This consequently has grown Croatian citizenry living abroad and led to large scale immigration to Croatia and the broader European Union.

The border between the two countries have changed drastically leading to ambiguity around the diasporic nature of Croats in Bosnia and Herzegovina. Croatia is considered a nation state while the community in Bosnia and Herzegovina is considered a constituent nation of that country. They are frequently referred to as Bosnian Croats, but since the War in Bosnia and Herzegovina the number of Herzegovinian Croats exceeds the number in Bosnia. The Croats maintain an unofficial capital in Mostar, with the city being home to the largest Croatian population.

There is no precise data regarding Bosnia and Herzegovina's population since the last war. The UNHCR conducted an unofficial census in 1996, but the data has not been recognized. Ethnic cleansing in the 1990s saw the vast majority of Croats resettle to Federation of Bosnia and Herzegovina. This region directly borders the Croatian region of Dalmatia. It is estimated that there are approximately 600,000 Croats in Bosnia and Herzegovina. According to 2000 data from the CIA World Factbook, Bosnia and Herzegovina is ethnically 14.3% Croat.

=== Canada ===
Croatians reportedly immigrated to Canada as early as 1541 when two Croatians from Dalmatia served on the crew of Jacques Cartier's third voyage to Canada. There are approximately 114,880 Canadians of Croatian ethnic origin as reported in the 2011 National Household Survey. The Croatian community is present in most major Canadian cities (including Toronto, Hamilton, Ottawa, Winnipeg, Vancouver, Calgary, Windsor, and Montreal, as well as Mississauga and Oakville) in the form of designated Croatian churches, parks, and other organizations.

Notable Croatian Canadian organizations include the Croatian Fraternal Union, the Croatian Canadian Folklore Federation (Vancouver), and the Croatian Canadian Cultural Centre (Calgary). Some of the more popular Croatian Canadian events are the Croatian-North American Soccer Tournament and the Canadian-Croatian Folklore Festival. Croatian Canadians have had a notable presence in the form of soccer teams all around Canada, one of the most famous clubs was the now defunct Toronto Metros-Croatia, who are succeeded by Toronto Croatia.

=== Chile ===
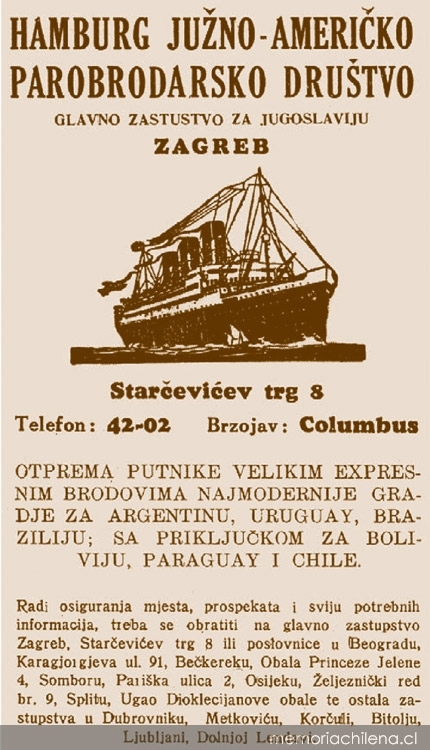
19th Century ad-poster of Croatian ship ready to travel to South America.

Croats are an important ethnic group in Chile; they are citizens of Chile who were either born in Europe or are Chileans of Croatian descent deriving their Croatian ethnicity from one or both parents. Chile has one of the largest communities of ethnic Croats outside the Balkans Peninsula and it is one of the most significant communities in the Croatian diaspora – second only to that which is found in the United States. They are one of the main examples of successful assimilation of a non Spanish-speaking European ethnic group into Chilean society. Many successful entrepreneurs, scientists, artists and prominent politicians holding the highest offices in the country have been of Croatian descent.

The Croatian community first established itself in two provinces situated in the extreme ends of Chile: Antofagasta, in the Atacama desert of the north and Punta Arenas in the Patagonian region in the south. The massive arrival of Croats in Chile began in 1864 and the migration grew steadily until 1956 – reaching a number of more than 60,000.

It is officially accepted that there are up to 380,000 Chileans of Croatian descent (who clearly identify themselves as Chilean-Croats).

=== Argentina ===
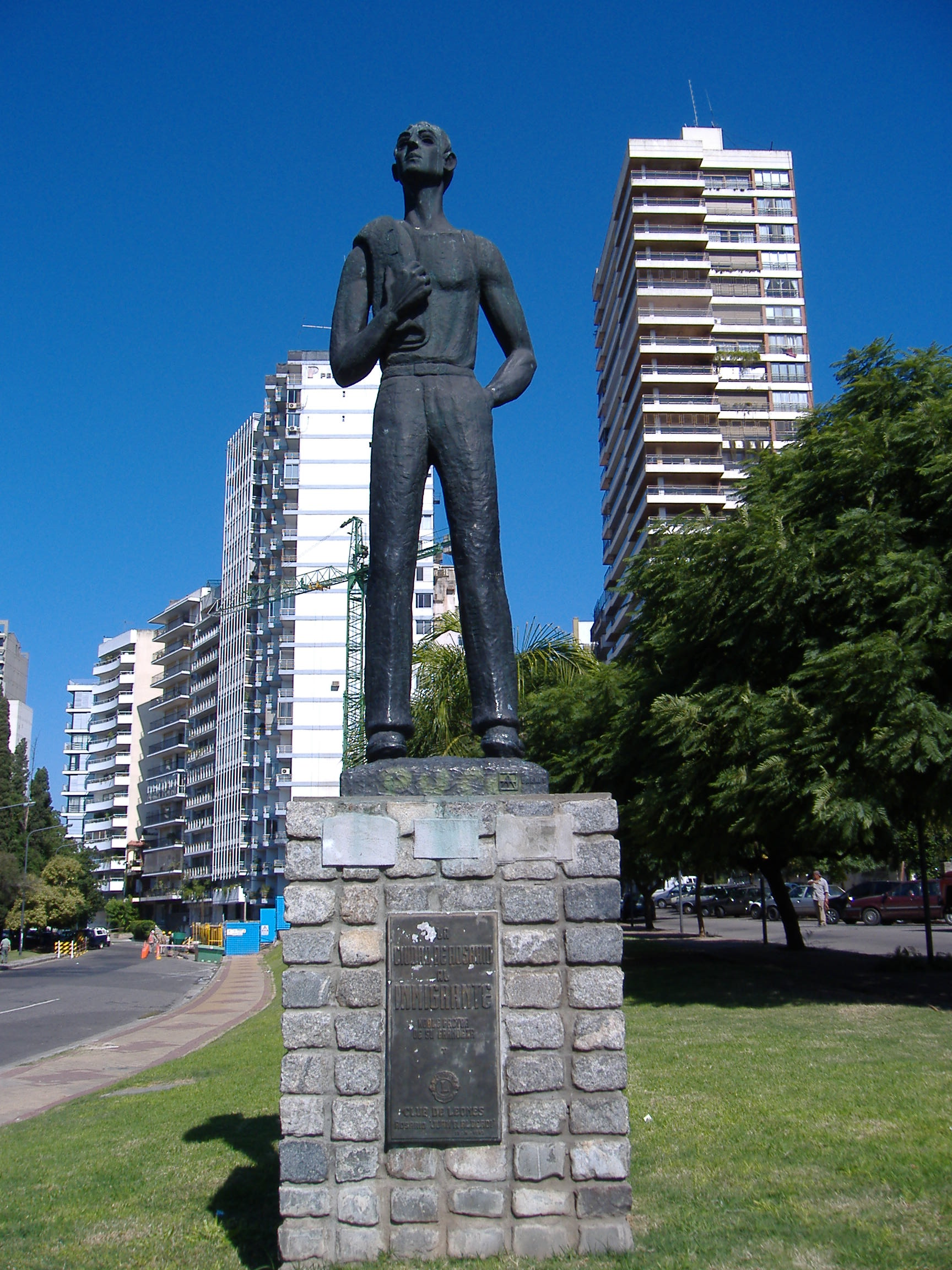
A statue honoring the immigrants, in Rosario, 2006

Argentines of Croatian descent number over 250,000. The most successful of all the Croats in Argentina was also one of the first to arrive. Nikola Mihanović came to Montevideo, Uruguay in 1867. Having settled in Buenos Aires, by 1909 Mihanović owned 350 vessels of one kind or another, including 82 steamers, owning, in that time, the biggest boat company in Argentina. By 1918, he employed 5,000 people, mostly from his native Dalmatia which was then under Austro-Hungarian and Italian rule. Mihanović by himself was thus a major factor in building up a Croatian community which remains primarily Dalmatian to this day, although it contains people from other Croatian regions.

The second wave of Croat immigration was far more numerous, totalling 15,000 by 1939. Mostly peasants, these immigrants fanned out to work the land in Buenos Aires province, Santa Fe, Chaco and Patagonia. This wave was accompanied by a numerous clergy to attend their spiritual needs, especially Franciscans.

If the first two waves had been primarily economic, the third wave after the Second World War was eminently political. Some 20,000 Croatian political refugees came to Argentina, and most became construction workers on Peron's public works projects until they started to pick up some Spanish. Today, many descendants of the Croatian immigrants still know Croatian, although different than the modern-day Croatian language.

=== Paraguay ===
The largest number of Croats arrived in Paraguay between 1860 and 1920. In those years, Croats emigrated mainly from the Dalmatian coast, predominantly from southern Dalmatia (islands and Boka Kotorska). Their main motivation for emigration was economic. The first Croat in Paraguay was Ivan the Baptist Marchesetti, a missionary of the Society of Jesus, a native of Rijeka, who served in the Jesuit missions in Paraguay from 1757 until his death in Paraguay (1767). Most of the Croats living in Paraguay are descended from these early immigrants. In the beginning, they were engaged in trade, pharmacy, small trades, mechanical works, gunsmiths, river navigation, rural jobs such as selling wood, construction, animal husbandry, professional jobs, etc.

According to the statistical study conducted in 2022, approximately 41,502 Croatian descendants live in the Republic of Paraguay. The majority of Croats settled in urban and semi-urban areas, some were landowners, lumberjacks, wholesalers. Croats and their descendants were scattered in all areas of the country, and according to our demographic study by place of birth, the largest number of Croatian descendants live in the eastern part of the country. The largest number of Croats live in the cities of Asunción, Concepción, Encarnación, San Lorenzo, Luque, Presidente Franco and the surrounding areas of each of them.

=== Uruguay ===
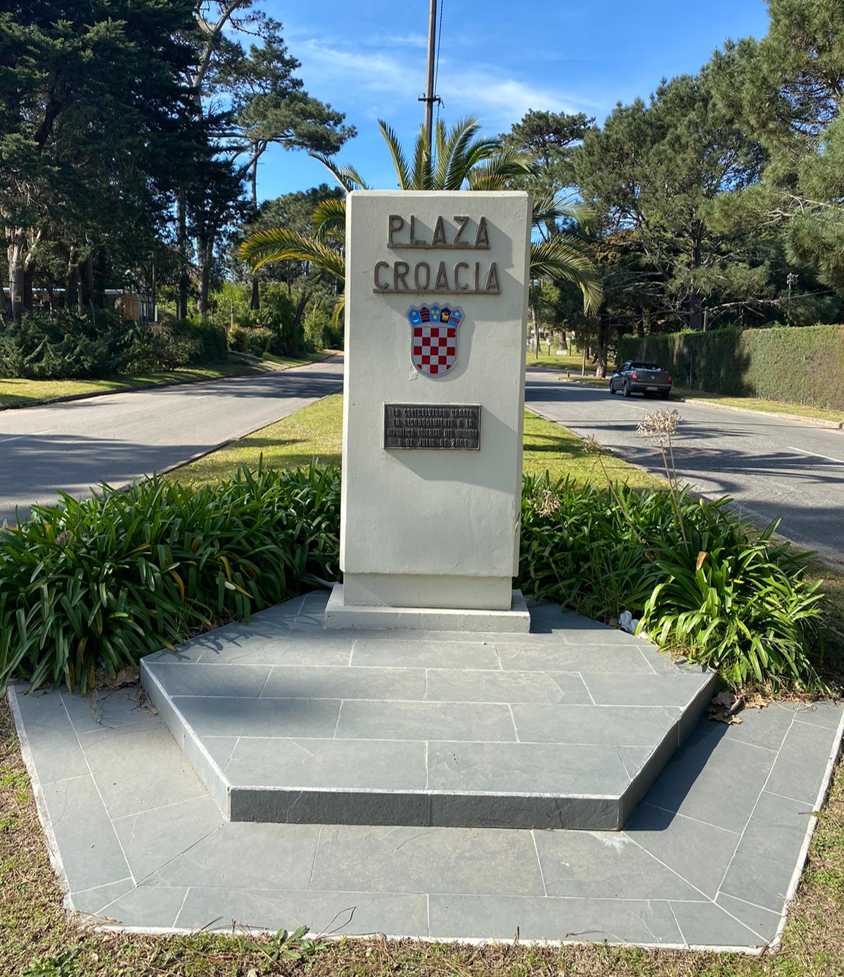
Croatia Square in Punta del Este, 2024

The first records of Croatian settlers in Uruguay date back to the 18th century. The oldest in this regard is the will of Šimun Matulić, from 1790, which states that he was born on the island of Brač, during the Republic of Venice and that after his death he left several individuals with Croatian surnames to look after his properties in colonial Montevideo.

In the late 19th century, there was considerable immigration of Croatians to Uruguay, mainly from the region of Dalmatia. Most of them settled in Montevideo, however, small communities were established in towns such as Conchillas and Carmelo. In 1928 the Hogar Croata de Montevideo (Spanish for 'Croatian Home of Montevideo') was founded with the aim of spreading the culture and the language, as well as bringing together immigrants and their descendants. For much of the 20th century, the Sociedad Yugoslava Bratstvo del Uruguay (Spanish for 'Yugoslav Bratstvo Society of Uruguay') was composed of ethnic Croats, as well as Montenegrins, Serbs, Bosnians and Slovenes, but ceased to exist in the 1990s due to the Yugoslav Wars.

=== Colombia ===
The Croatian community is present in most major Colombian cities, including Bogotá, Cali and Barranquilla. There are approximately 5,800 Colombians of Croatian ethnic origin as reported.

=== Venezuela ===
Croatian immigration to Venezuela dates back to the late nineteenth century, and was characterized by the individual arrival of merchant seamen. Until World War I, only a few Croats settled in Venezuela, nevertheless it was in the period of World War II when the Croatian families that escaped from the government of Tito began to settle in the country. Most of these immigrants came from present-day Croatian territory, particularly from the coastal and inland areas of Dalmatia. Others came from Bosnia and Herzegovina.

The majority of the members of the Croatian community settled in Caracas and Valencia and, to a lesser extent, in other cities of the interior: Maracay, Maracaibo, Mérida and in localities of the Yaracuy state, where some joined the work in the sugar industry. Also, several forest technicians arrived that later contributed to the establishment of the School of Forestry Engineering at the University of the Andes. A large percentage of the Croatians were artisans, who later became small entrepreneurs, and many were professionals, especially engineers and technicians, who had outstanding performance in Venezuela.

=== Australia ===
Croatia has been a significant source of migrants to Australia, particularly in the 1960s and 1970s. In 2016, 133,264 persons resident in Australia (0.6%) identified themselves as having a Croatian ancestor. In 2006, there were over 50,000 Croatian-born Australians, with 70% arriving before 1980. This community is quickly ageing and almost half of Croatian-born Australians were over the age of sixty in 2006. However, Croatian language and culture continues to be embraced amongst younger generations and descendants of post-war immigrants. In 2001, the Croatian language was spoken by 69,900 people in Australia.

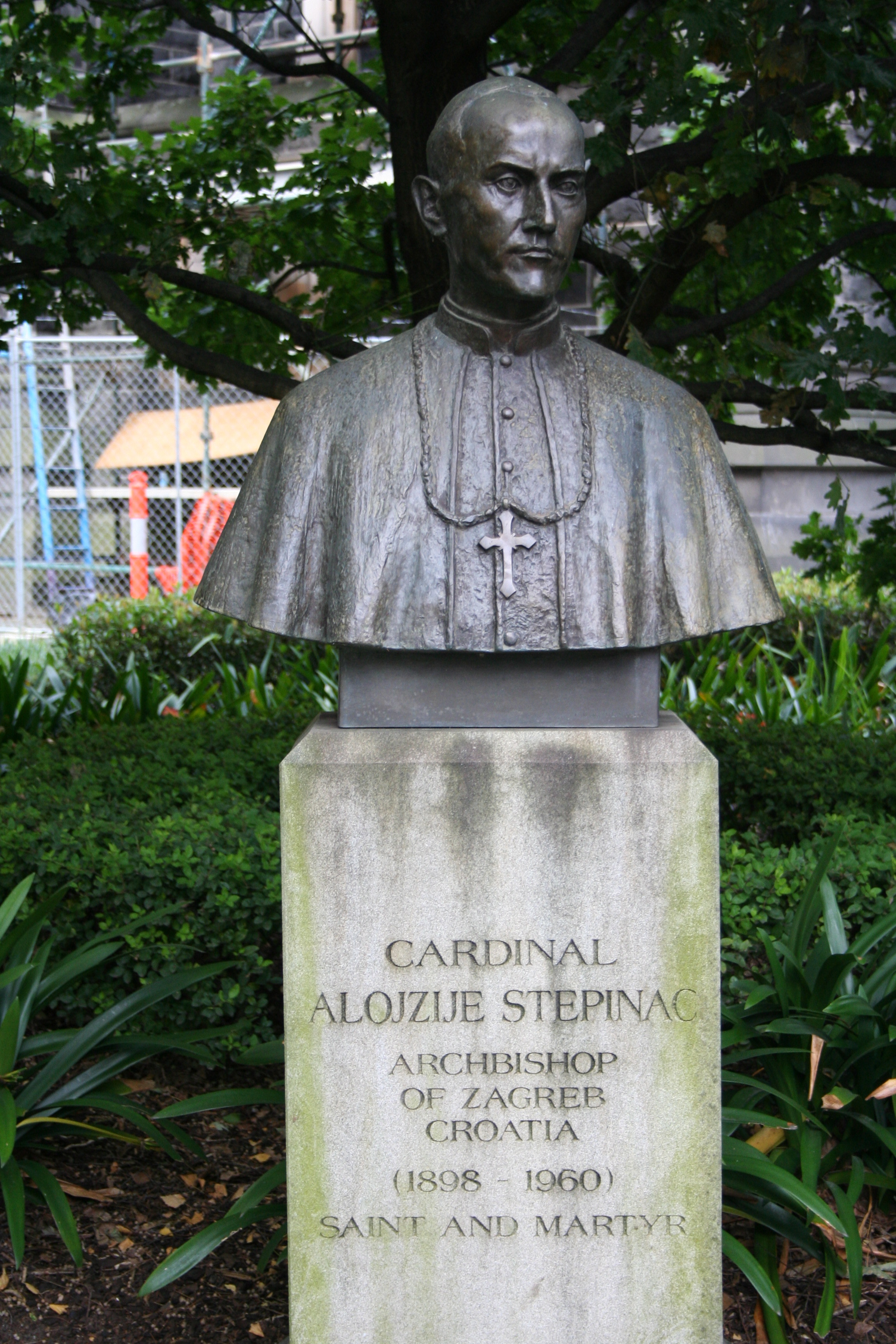
Croatian cardinal Aloysius Stepinac in Clifton Hill, 2011

The vast majority of Croatians in Australia are Christians, mostly Catholics while there are Protestant, Greek Catholic and Seventh-Day Adventists, as well as a small minority adhering to Islam. There are Croatian-speaking Catholic congregations in most major cities. In Melbourne, there are congregations in St Albans, Taylors Lakes, Hillside and Avondale Heights. In Sydney there are congregations in Blacktown, St John's Park, Summer Hill, Mona Vale, Botany, Chatswood West and South Hurstville. In Adelaide, there are Croatian-speaking congregations in North Adelaide and Adelaide CBD and in Canberra and rural New South Wales there are regular services at Farrer, Evatt and Batemans Bay. Balcatta and North Fremantle host Croatian services in Perth. St Nikola Tavelic Church in Clifton Hill is an important religious and cultural centre for Melbourne's Croatian community. There is a Croatian Seventh-Day Adventist congregation located in St Albans, in Melbourne's western suburbs as well as one in Springvale, while there is also Croatian Adventist congregation in Dundas - in Sydney's north-west. In addition, Melbourne's local Croatian Muslim community has established the Croatian Islamic Centre in Maidstone also in Melbourne's west. These Muslims are descendants of those who converted to Islam after the Ottoman conquest of the Balkans. Melbourne's 35,000 Croatians were initially concentrated in the inner suburbs though now most live in the Western suburbs particularly in the City of Brimbank where a Croatian mayor (Brooke Gujinovic) was elected in 1999. There are around 90 Croatian sporting, religious or cultural clubs or organisations operating in Melbourne. In Sydney, there are over 30,000 Croatians, with a large concentration residing in St John's Park and surrounding suburbs. Furthermore, there is a high concentration of Croatians in Geelong, where the community has a significant influence, particularly in Bell Park where over 15% of the population speaks Croatian at home.

It is likely that the first Croat in Sydney was Stefano Posich, who was born in Sicily to Croatian parents and migrated to Australia in 1813. Croats first immigrated to Australia during the Victorian gold rush of the 1850s. During this time, Croats were counted as Austrians because much of Croatia was a part of the Habsburg Empire. Croatians were not recorded separately (from other Yugoslavs) until the 1996 Census. In 1947, at least 5,000 Croatians were residing in Australia - mainly from the coastal region of Dalmatia. Between 1890 and World War II, at least 250 Croatians settled in Melbourne. Since then, thousands of Croatians have arrived after World War II as displaced persons or economic migrants. Many Croatians found work in manufacturing and construction. a substantial amount of Croats came to Australia during the 1960s and 1970s due to high unemployment, limited economic opportunities and anti-Croatian sentiment in Yugoslavia - many of these immigrants came to Australia under family reunion programs. Many Croatian Australians were born in former Yugoslav states such as Bosnia and Herzegovina.

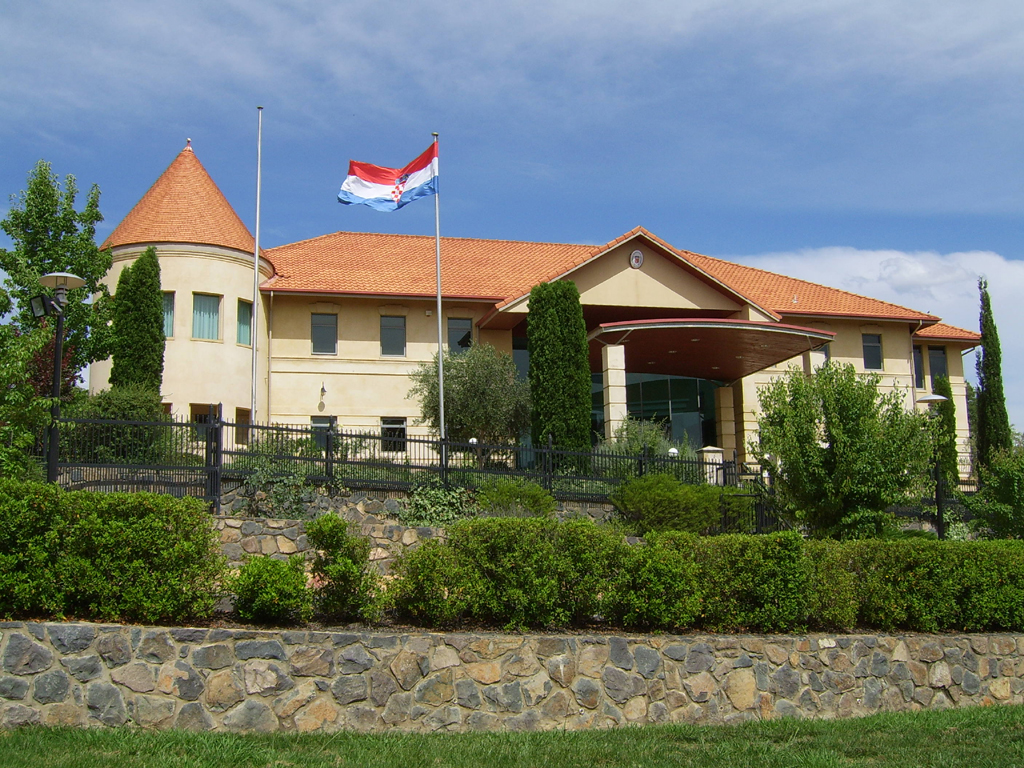
Croatian embassy in Canberra, 2007

Croatian people are visible in all parts of Australian society, but they have made a big impact in the sporting arena with many football clubs being formed by immigrants, two of the more famous and most successful being Melbourne Knights FC and Sydney United. Both clubs have played in Australia's top league the NSL and Melbourne Knights winning the championship back to back in the season 1994/5 and 1995/6. Sydney United has produced the largest number of full Australian internationals. The Croatian community holds the Australian-Croatian Soccer Tournament which has been held annually since 1974. It is the largest 'ethnic' based soccer competition in Australia as well as the oldest national soccer competition in the nation. Some famous Croatian-Australian football players to represent Australia are Mark Viduka, Jason Čulina, Mark Bresciano, Zeljko Kalac, Josip Skoko, Tony Popovic all who ironically lined up against Croatia in the 2006 World Cup in Germany, playing against Australian-born Croatian international Josip Šimunić. A total of 47 Croatian Australians have gone on to play for the Australian national team, including 7 who captained the national team. Other notable Croatian Australians include actor Eric Bana, former Archbishop of Adelaide Matthew Beovich, politician John Tripovich, rugby league coach and former player Ivan Cleary, tennis player Jelena Dokic and television presenter Sarah Harris amongst others.

Since Croatian independence in the 1990s, an official embassy has been opened in Canberra while consulates have been established in Melbourne, Sydney and Perth.

=== New Zealand ===
The first Croat to settle in New Zealand is believed to be Pauvo (Paul) Lupis who deserted his Austrian ship in the late 1800s. Although Croats had contact with New Zealand and a few had settled, the proper migration waves began when the Austro-Hungarian Empire allowed Italian wine and oil into the Empire's territories for a substantially less duty, thus rendering peasants and farmers bankrupt. This treaty was the beginning of many events which causes migration mainly from Dalmatia. There were 5,000 migrants of Croatian descent between 1890 and 1914, prior to World War I. A further 1,600 migrated during the 1920s before the onset of the Great Depression. Another 600 in the 1930s, prior to World War II. Between 1945 and 1970, 3,200 migrated to New Zealand. Arrivals during the 1990s fled the conflict in former Yugoslavia.

The main destination for settlers was the Northland gum fields where the young boys were sent to dig kauri tree gum from swamps. Until the 1950s, the gum was used to varnish wooden furniture and the likes. Here on these fields, Croats were treated as outcasts by the British Empire and called "Austrians" because of the passport they carried. They were looked at with suspicion, mainly because they would share profits and send money back to their villages in Dalmatia. Many British settlers who worked the same fields resented the Dalmatian gum-diggers, whom they nicknamed "Dallies", a term which is still occasionally used. On these fields as outcasts, the Croatian immigrants were thrown together with the other outcasts, the native Māori people who having many of the same view points and coming from villages themselves.

Many Croatian men married Māori women as they came to New Zealand as bachelors before a bride could be sent from their home village. The local Maori called them Tarara because they spoke in Croatian very fast. Many Māori nowadays refer to themselves as Tarara and carry Croatian family names. Miss New Zealand 2010 Cody Yerkovich (spelled in Croatian as Jerković) is an example of the Māori Croatian mix Tarara. A Tarara Day is celebrated by the Croatian-Māori community every March.

In modern times, Croatian immigrants have continued to arrive, with many starting their own business with the abundance of good soil and land. Many turned to work similar to what they did back in Dalmatia, such as vineyards, orchards and fishing. Some notable companies in the wine industry are Delegat, Nobilo, Selak, Villa Maria, Montana, and Kumeu River Wines, all owned by Croatian families.

In fishing, there are two big companies, the first being Talley's Seafood founded in 1936, by Ivan Peter Talijancich (spelled Talijančić in Croatian) established Talley's in Motueka, New Zealand, and the second being Simunovich (spelled Šimunović in Croatian) Fisheries Limited which has thrived and become a large company from deep sea scampi.

In sport, many small clubs and associations have come and gone. Central United (formerly Central Croatia SC) formed in 1962; the club is still going to this day. The football club, formed by a group of young Croatian immigrants from Dalmatia, played initially in the lower division of the Northern League before rising to become one of New Zealand's top football clubs by the late 1990s.

Central United FC were the New Zealand champions in 1999, 2001 and were runner-up in 1998. Central United FC also won the Chatham Cup in 1997, 1998, 2005 and 2007 and were runners-up in 2000 and 2001. Their home ground is at Kiwitea Street Stadium, in Sandringham (Auckland).

Some notable former players are:

- Chris Zoricich
- Ivan Vicelich – New Zealand's most capped international.
- Luka Bonačić – Ex-Hajduk Split player and coach.

Other notable New Zealanders of Croatian descent include singer Lorde, historian James Belich, golfer Frank Nobilo, rugby player Frano Botica, motor racing drivers Robbie Francevic and Paul Radisich, tennis player Marina Erakovic, architect Ivan Mercep, artist Milan Mrkusich, and musicians Peter and Margaret Urlich.

=== India ===
There is a limited Croatian diaspora in India. From 1999 to 2025, approximately 250 residents of Gandaulim village in Goa, India were able to claim Croatian citizenship through jus sanguinis nationality law regarding colonial descent. The Croatian Republic of Ragusa (1358–1808) had a colonial settlement – Sao Braz – in the Indian village for over a century alongside the Portuguese. Since the 2000s, heritage tourism between Dubrovnik, Croatia and Gandaulim has increased, maintaining legacy ties. The Church of Saint Blaise, honoring the patron saint of Dubrovnik, in the village is a common tourist attraction buoyed by Croatia–India relations.

== Communities ==
- Croatian Argentines
- Croatian Australians
- Burgenland Croats (Austria)
- Croats of Belgium
- Croatian Bolivians
- Croats of Bosnia and Herzegovina
- Croatian Canadians
- Croatian Chileans
- Croats in the Czech Republic
- Croats in Germany
- Croats of Hungary
- Croats of Italy
- Molise Croats (Italy)
- Croats in North Macedonia
- Croatian Mexicans
- Croats of Montenegro
- Croatian New Zealanders
- Croatian Peruvians
- Krashovani (Romania)
- Croats of Serbia
- Croats in Slovakia
- Croats of Slovenia
- Croats in Sweden
- Croats of Switzerland
- Ukraine White Croats
- Croatian Americans
- Croatian Venezuelans

== See also ==
- Croatian Heritage Foundation (Hrvatska matica iseljenika)
- Tourism in Croatia
- Greater Croatia
