= Croatia–Mexico relations =

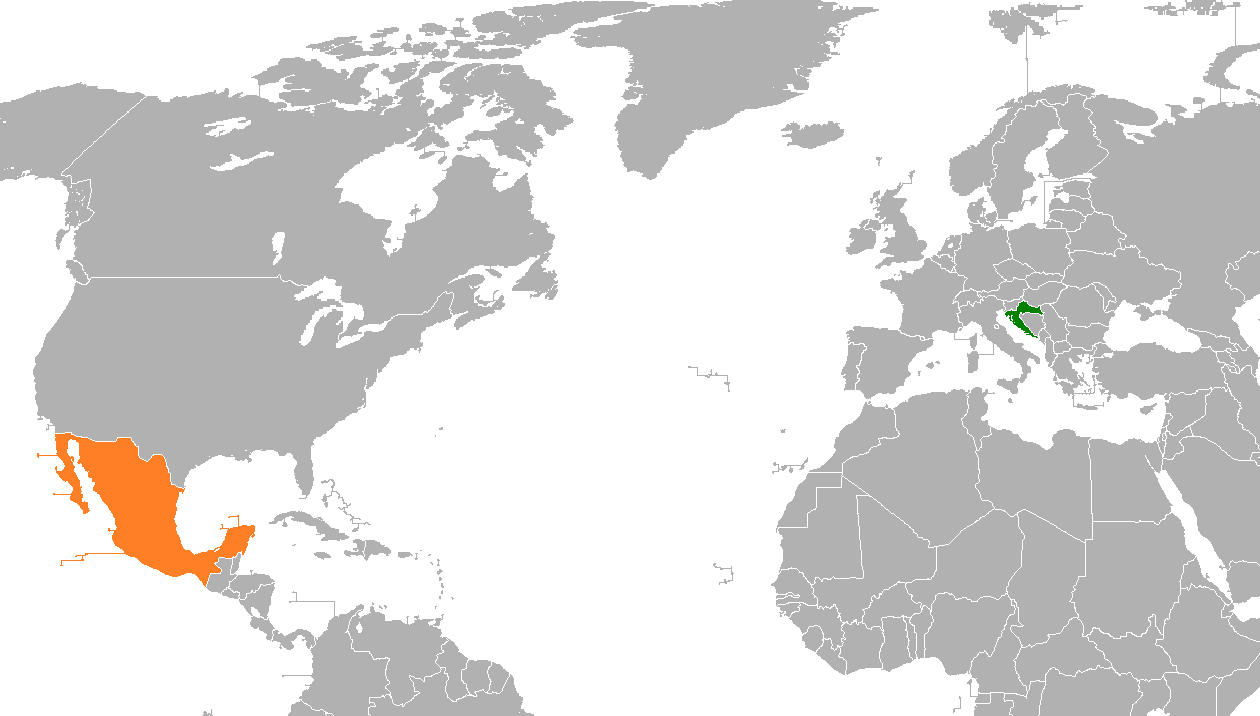

- Croatia: Mexico

The nations of Croatia and Mexico established diplomatic missions in 1992. Both countries are mutual members of the United Nations.

== History ==
Before Croatia's independence from Yugoslavia in 1991, Mexico and Yugoslavia maintained diplomatic relations. Mexico recognized Croatia on 22 May 1992. Diplomatic relations between Croatia and Mexico were officially established on 6 December 1992. In April 1997, Croatian Vice Foreign Minister Frane Krinc paid a visit to Mexico while on trip to various Latin American nations.

In March 2002, Croatian President Stjepan Mesić paid a visit to Mexico to attend the International Conference on Financing for Development in Monterrey and met with President Vicente Fox. This was the first and highest level visit paid to Mexico by a Croatian head-of-state. In May 2002, a Mexican Senatorial delegation, led by Senator César Jáuregui Robles, participated at the Conference of Presidents of the Parliaments of the members and observers of the Council of Europe, held in Zagreb.

In October 2008, Mexican Foreign Secretary Patricia Espinosa paid an official visit to Croatia, which was the first visit at a ministerial level by a Mexican official to Croatia since the establishment of diplomatic relations. While in Croatia, Foreign Secretary Espinosa met with President Stpejan Mesić and Prime Minister Ivo Sanader.

In October 2010, both nations held the First Meeting of Political Consultations between the Foreign Ministries of Mexico and Croatia held in Mexico City and attended by Croatian Deputy Foreign Minister Davor Božinović. In 2022, both nations celebrated 30 years of diplomatic relations.

In 2024, Croatian Foreign State Secretary Frano Matušić paid a visit to Mexico to attend the IV Meeting of Political Consultations.

== High-level visits ==
High-level visits from Croatia to Mexico

- Foreign Vice Minister Frane Krinc (1997)
- President Stjepan Mesić (2002)
- Deputy Foreign Minister Davor Božinović (2010)
- State Secretary Frano Matušić (2024)

High-level visit from Mexico to Croatia

- Senator César Jáuregui Robles (2002)
- Foreign Secretary Patricia Espinosa (2008)

== Bilateral agreements ==
Both nations have signed a few bilateral agreements such as a Memorandum of Understanding for the Establishment of a Mechanism of Consultation in Matters of Mutual Interest (2008); Agreement on the Elimination of Visa Requirements for Diplomatic and Official Passport Holders (2008); Agreement on the Elimination on Visa Requirements for Ordinary Passport holders (2010); Agreement on Educational, Cultural and Sports Cooperation (2011); and a Memorandum of Understanding between both nations Ministry's of Foreign Affairs on Cooperation in Diplomatic Training, with the goal of exchanging best practices and experiences in this field (2024).

== Croats in Mexico ==
There is a small immigrant community of Croats in Mexico, mostly in the capital and its surroundings. Mexican cuisine, music (mariachi) and soap operas are popular in Croatia. Los Caballeros is the first Croatian band that performs traditional Mexican music. In 2000, it successfully participated in the 7th International Mariachi and Charreria meeting in Guadalajara.

Croatian sailor and soldier Vinko Paletin joined the expedition that was led by Francisco de Montejo on the Yucatán Peninsula. As a member of the Mexican Dominican Province of St. James, Paletin had been preparing to become a priest in a Mexican Monetary of St. Dominic. At the end of summer of 1546, he returned to Europe.

18th century Croatian Jesuit missionary Ferdinand Konščak had become one of the most famous researchers of Mexican peninsula Baja California, proving that it was a peninsula. Konščak was a distinguished mathematician, astronomer, naturalist, geologist, builder of roads and embankments and supervisor of all the Jesuit reductions in Mexico. A small Mexican island, Roca Consag, was named after him.

Croatian Jesuit priest Ivan Ratkaj came to present-day Mexican province of Chihuahua in 1680. He has written three very detailed reports about his trip, landscape, as well as about life, nature and customs of indigenous people. These are the oldest descriptions of this region. With his third travelogue, Ratkaj enclosed a map of the province marked with latitude and longitude, parts of the world, missionary stations and Spanish forts, habitats of provincial Indian tribes and rivers and mountains. It is also one of the first mapping works by Croatian authors, and the oldest map of that Mexican province. Map was made in 1683 as a drawing on paper. The original is kept in the Central Jesuit Archives in Rome. Small copy was published by EJ Burrus in La obra de la Provincia cartografico Mexicana de la Compañía de Jesús, 1567-1967, Madrid 1967, P. II. carta Nr. 16.

== Trade ==
In 1997, Mexico signed a Free Trade Agreement with the European Union (which includes Croatia). In 2023, trade between Croatia and Mexico totaled US$104.6 million. Croatia's main exports to Mexico include: machinery for working rubber or plastics, ignition or starting equipment, electrical equipment, articles of leather, hydraulic cement, wood, medicines, parts and accessories for motor vehicles, tools, and glassware for laboratories. Mexico's main exports to Croatia include: preparations hides after tanning or crusting, alcohol, chemical based products, machinery, telephones and mobile phones, and tubes and pipes of iron or steel.

Croatian gaming franchise Friendly Fire operates in Mexico. Mexican multinational companies such as Cemex and América Móvil operate in Croatia. América Móvil is the principal owner of A1 Telekom Austria Group (which operates in Croatia under A1 Hrvatska).

== Diplomatic missions ==
- Croatia is accredited to Mexico from its embassy in Washington, D.C., United States and maintains an honorary consulate in Mexico City.
- Mexico is accredited to Croatia from its embassy in Budapest, Hungary and maintains an honorary consulate in Zagreb.

== See also ==
- Foreign relations of Croatia
- Foreign relations of Mexico
- Croatian Mexicans
- Mexico–Yugoslavia relations
