= Croatian Mexicans =

Mexican citizens of Croatian descent

Croatian Mexicans croata-mexicanos
Total population
- 52

Regions with significant populations
- Mexico City, Quintana Roo, Jalisco, Sonora, Queretaro, Baja California, Puebla, Nuevo León

Languages
- Mexican Spanish, Croatian

Religion
- Roman Catholicism

Related ethnic groups
- Croats

Croatian Mexicans (Croato-mexicanos, Croata mexicanos) are Mexican citizens of Croatian descent. There is a small immigrant community of Croats in Mexico mainly in and around the capital. Mexican cuisine, music and soap operas are popular in Croatia. Los Caballeros is the first Croatian band to perform traditional Mexican music. In 2000, they successfully participated in the 7th International Meeting of Mariachi and Charrería in Guadalajara, Mexico.

== History ==
The Croatian sailor and soldier, Vinko Paletin, joined the expedition that was led by Francisco de Montejo in the Yucatán Peninsula. As a member of the Mexican Dominican Province of Santiago Paletin, he was in Mexico preparing a Monetary from Santo Domingo to be a priest. Eventually, in the late summer of 1546 he returned to Europe.

In the 18th century the Croatian Jesuit missionary Fernando Consag (Mexico: Fernando Consag) has become one of the most famous researchers on the Mexican peninsula of Baja California. He proved that California was a peninsula. Konščak was a distinguished mathematician, astronomer, naturalist, geologist, builder of roads and embankments, and the supervisor of all the Jesuit reductions in Mexico. Small Mexican island Roca Consag was named after him.

The Croatian Jesuit missionary Ivan Ratkaj arrived in the present Mexican state of Chihuahua in 1680. He has written three reports on his journey, landscape, as well as on the life, nature and customs of the indigenous people. These are the oldest descriptions of this region. It is also made up of many details. With his third travel book, Ratkaj attached a map of the province marked with latitude and longitude, parts of the world, mission stations and Spanish forts, habitats of Indian tribes, and provincial rivers and mountains. It is also one of the first mapping works by Croatian authors, and the oldest map of the Mexican province. Map was made in 1683 as a drawing on paper. The original is preserved in the central archives of the Jesuits in Rome. Small copy was published by EJ Burrus in La Obra de la Provincia Cartografico Mexicana de la Compañía de Jesús, 1567–1967, Madrid, 1967, p II. Letter No. 16.

In 1926, on November 1, the Hotel Kuraica was inaugurated, owned by a Croatian immigrant Pablo Kuraica (Pavo Kurajica) and his wife Elia Casillas Millán.

Originally from Dubrovnik, Dalmatia (today Croatia), Pablo Kuraica (Pavo Kurajica) emigrated to Cajeme in the early twenties after trying his luck In San Francisco, California, he started his activity in Cajeme with agriculture, some time later he opened a hardware store and simultaneously started with the Hotel Industry in the backyard of his house, installing a tent where hosted travelers. With the growth of demand, the Kuraica couple decided to build the building that still survives on Calle 5 de Febrero 211 Sur. Celebrities such as General Lázaro Cárdenas, the cetemista leader Fidel Velázquez and the comedian Paco Miller have stayed at the Hotel Kuraica.

In 1991 after the outbreak of the War in Yugoslavia some Croatian families emigrated to Mexico as refugees.

== Notable people ==
- Gabriela Spanic, Mexican-Venezuelan actress of Croatian origin
- Geraldine Bazan, actress of Croatian descent
- Luis Roberto Alves, commentator and former soccer player
- Antonio Castellanos, sculptor
- Moisés Jinich, football forward
- Fran Meric, actress, host and model
- Enrique Novi, actor
- Víctor Manuel Vucetich, former professional footballer and manager

== See also ==
- Croatia–Mexico relations
- Croats
- List of Croats
