= Gandaulim (Ilhas) =

Gandaulim São Brás
- Village
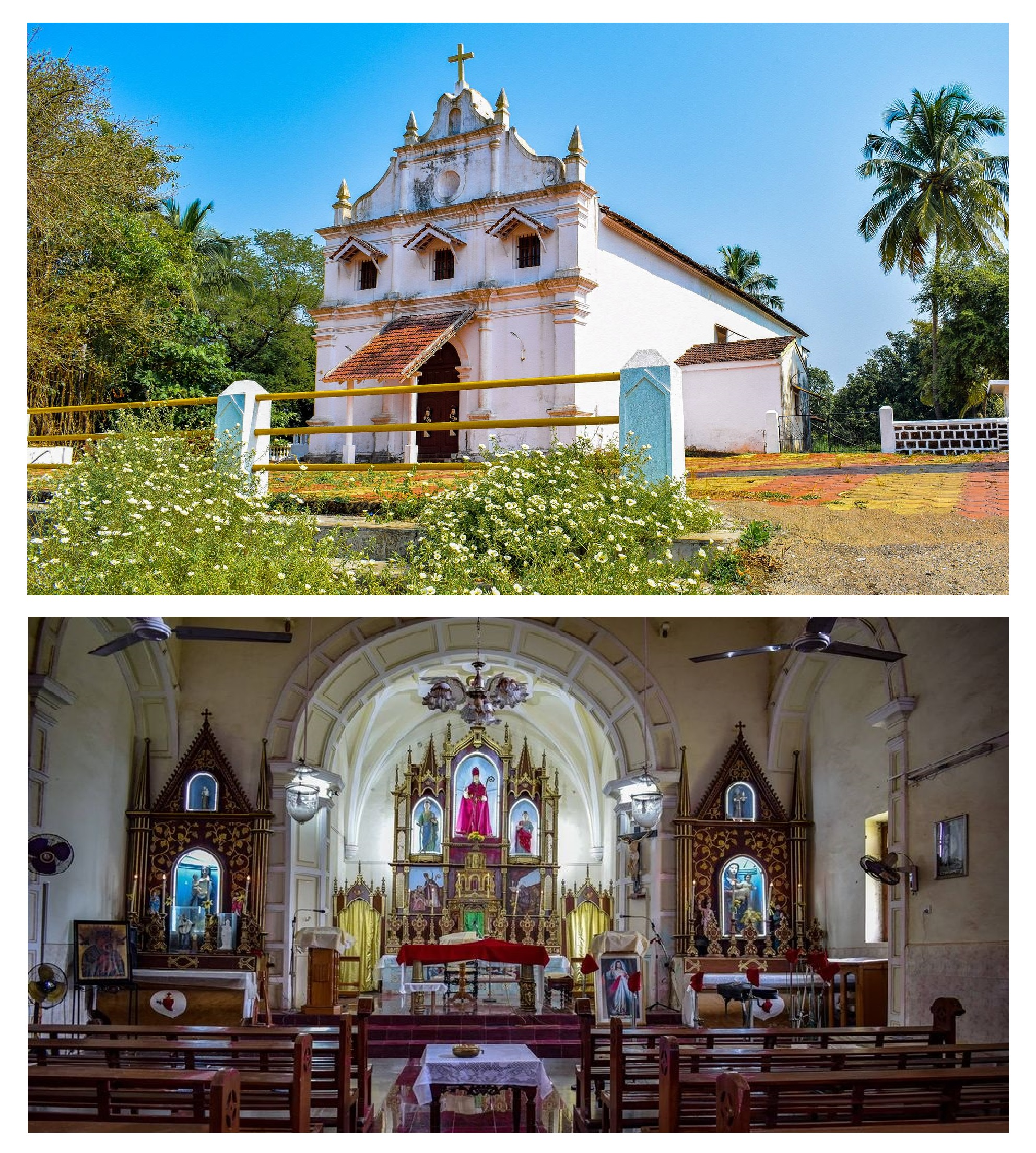
- Igreja de São Brás, Gandaulim

- Location within Goa
- Coordinates: 15°30′44.5″N 73°56′28.9″E
- Country: India
- State: Goa
- District: North Goa
- Sub District: Ilhas
- Established: 1540s
- Named for: Saint Blaise

Government
  - Type: Panchayat
  - Sarpanch: unknown
- Elevation: 8 m (26 ft)

Population (2021)
  - Total: approx. 300
- Demonym: Gandaulicar

Languages
  - Official: Konkani
  - Also spoken (understood): English, Marathi, Hindi
  - Historical: Portuguese

Religions
  - Dominant: Christianity
  - Minor: Hinduism
  - Historical: Roman Catholicism
- Time zone: UTC+5:30 (IST)
- Postcode: 403505
- Telephone code: 08343

Gandaulim (historically known as São Brás) is a village located on the western bank of the Cumbarjua Canal, within Ilhas in the state of Goa, India. It marked the eastern end of the metropolitan City of Goa as a populous suburb in the 16th to 18th centuries.

== History ==
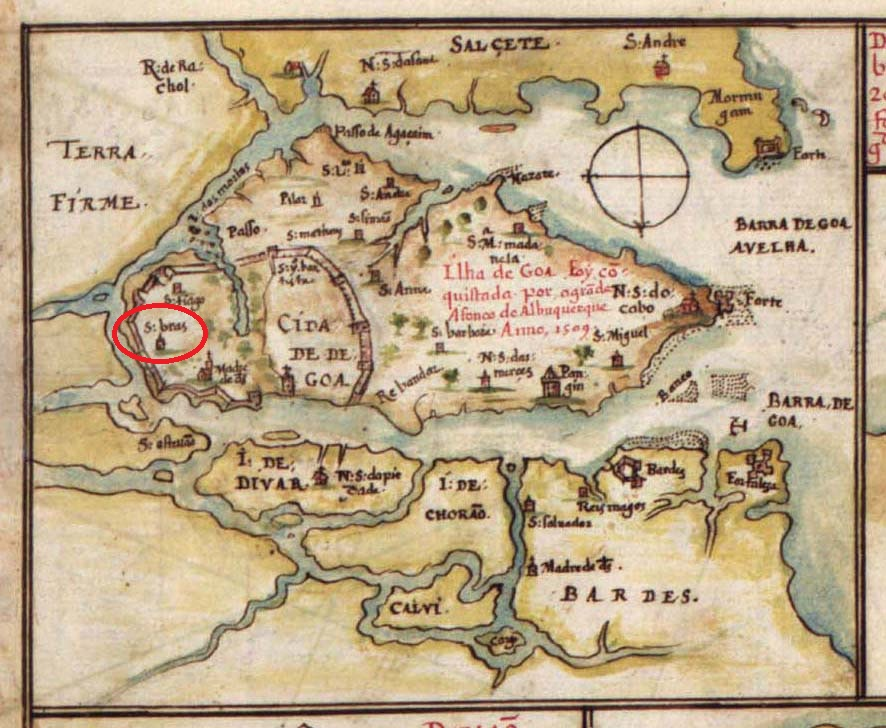
Map of "Sao Braz" in Goa, 1630

Croatian sailors and merchants from the Republic of Ragusa in Dalmatia established contact with Goa, India, in the 16th century, then amidst Portuguese colonization. Between 1530 and 1535, adventurers from Dubrovnik joined the Portuguese to establish Sao Braz, a small Ragusan colonial settlement in the modern-day village of Gandaulim. The colony was named after Saint Blaise, the patron saint of Dubrovnik. In the annals of 1605, Jakov Lukarević noted that Ragusan merchants invested in decorating a local church. Goese historian Gomes Catão documented the town to have a population of 12,000 settlers. The 1667 Dubrovnik earthquake destroyed the city of Dubrovnik which left the Ragusan Republic financially strained. Trading disputes with Portuguese settlers and declining trade with Indians forced the Republic of Ragusa to surrender their colony.

Public interest in the former colony was revived in 1999, when Croatian Indologist Zdravka Matišić discovered a reference to ties between Ragusa and Goa while studying Sanskrit texts in India. After an official Croatian delegation visited the village that year, benefactors have since donated to and refurbished local buildings. The Church of Saint Blaise in the village is a common tourist attraction buoyed by Croatia–India relations. Since the 2000s, heritage tourism between Dubrovnik, Croatia and Gandaulim has increased.

== Infrastructure ==
In 2016, a bridge was constructed on the outskirts of the village, over the canal. This bridge now links the islands of Tiswadi taluka to Cumbarjua.

== Gandaulim Fort ==
Gandaulim was a site of the historical Gandaulim Fort, which was demolished in early 21st century for a road expansion project.

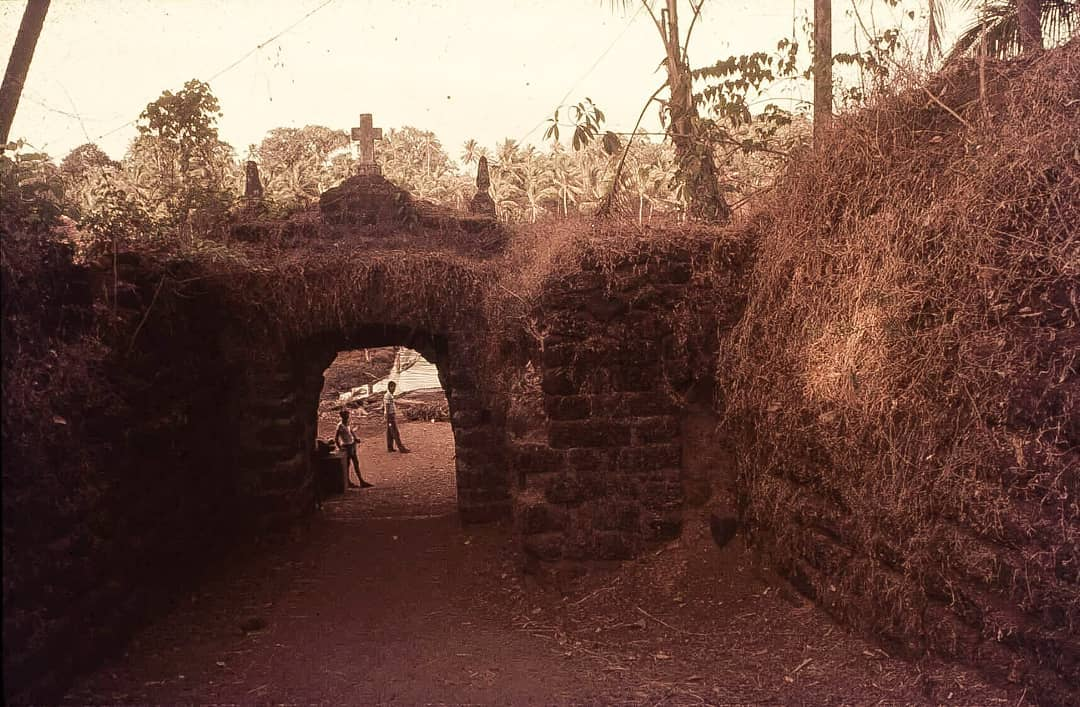
Gandaulim Fort Entrance Gate

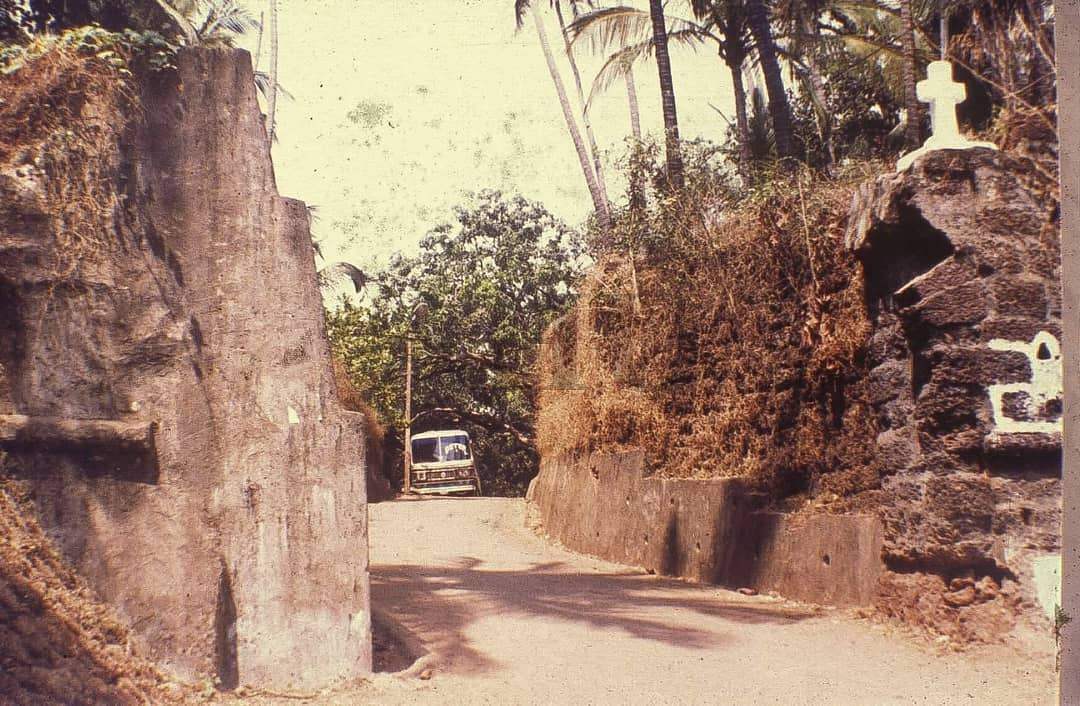
Gandaulim Fort Entrance Gate after Demolition

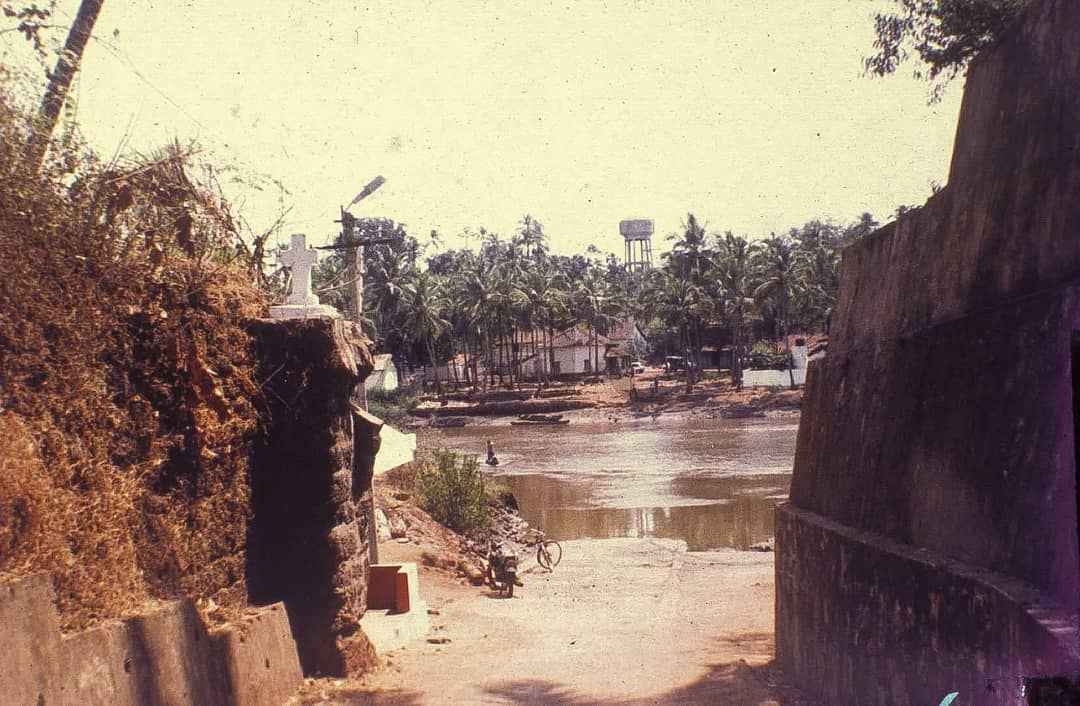
Gandaulim Fort Entrance Gate post Demolition

== See also ==
- Colonial India
- History of Goa
- History of Dubrovnik
- Catholic Church in India
- Foreign policy of Croatia
