= Croats in Germany =

Hrvati u Njemačkoj (Croatian) Kroaten in Deutschland (German)

Total population
- 435.000-550.000 (2023)

Regions with significant populations
- Munich, Berlin, Stuttgart, Frankfurt, Hamburg, Düsseldorf, Mannheim, Augsburg, Nuremberg

Languages
- Croatian, German

Religion
- Majority Roman Catholics

Related ethnic groups
- Croats, Croatian diaspora

Croats in Germany (Croatian: Hrvati u Njemačkoj; German: Kroaten in Deutschland) refers to persons living in Germany who have total or partial Croatian ancestry. They form the sixth largest ethnic minority in Germany. In 2021, there were 434,610 Croats holding Croatian citizenship and living in Germany. Croatia's State Office for the Croats Abroad, Croatian embassy in Berlin and Croatian Catholic Missions estimated that there are more than 500,000 Croats and their descendants living in Germany.

== Demographics ==
According to the German Federal Statistical Office of Wiesbaden in 2021, there were 434,610 Croatian citizens living in Germany. According to data from church institutions there are about 310,000 to 350,000 Croatians living in Germany.

== Numbers of Croats ==
=== In Germany per year ===
- 2021: 434,610
- 2020: 426,485
- 2019: -
- 2018: 395,665
- 2017: 367,900
- 2016: 332,605
- 2015: -
- 2014: 270,558
- 2013: -
- 2012: -
- 2011: -
- 2010: 220,199
- 2009: -
- 2008: -
- 2007: 225,309
- 2006: 227,510
- 2005: 228,926
- 2004: 229,172
- 2003: 236,570
- 2002: 230,987
- 2001: 223,819
- 1994: 176,251
- 1993: 153,146

=== Per federal state ===
In year 2019

Number of Croats per German federal state
#	Federal state	People
1.	Baden-Württemberg	122,835
2.	Bavaria	126,090
3.	Berlin	14,430
4.	Brandenburg	671
5.	Bremen	2,167
6.	Hamburg	6,630
7.	Hesse	53,785
8.	Mecklenburg-Vorpommern	260
9.	Lower Saxony	9,429
10.	North Rhine-Westphalia	48,043
11.	Rhineland-Palatinate	8,668
12.	Saarland	1,205
13.	Saxony	714
14.	Saxony-Anhalt	435
15.	Schleswig-Holstein	3,229
16.	Thuringia	189

=== Cities ===
In year 2019

Number of Croats in larger cities
#	City	People
1.	Munich	39,637
2.	Frankfurt	16,751
3.	Stuttgart	15,268
4.	Berlin	14,430
5.	Hamburg	6,630
6.	Nuremberg	5,893
7.	Mannheim	4,565
8.	Augsburg	4,223
9.	Düsseldorf	3,720
10.	Cologne	3,569
11.	Karlsruhe	3,383
12.	Essen	2,880
13.	Offenbach	2,420
14.	Hanover	2,300
15.	Pforzheim	2,193
16.	Dortmund	2,153
17.	Duisburg	2,044
18.	Wiesbaden	1,967
19.	Ulm	1,557
20.	Lübeck	1,413

Among the German cities Stuttgart and Pforzheim had the highest share of Croats in 2011 according to German Census data.

== Culture ==
Croatian Cultural Community Stuttgart (Hrvatska kulturna zajednica Stuttgart, HKZ Stuttgart) was established by Croatian immigrants in the autumn of 1983. They successfully ran at the elections for the City of Stuttgart's International Council. First then soon-to-become president of Croatia Franjo Tuđman visited Stuttgart and the Community in the October of 1988. HKZ organizes extracurricular classes of Croatian for the Croatian children ever since Croatia gained independence in the 1990s. HKZ regularly organizes "Ljetni festival kulture" (Summer festival of culture), with concerts of Croatian folklore ensembles and klapas, as well as presentations of the Croatian cuisine and wines.

=== Language ===
In July 2023, The Croaticum – Centre for Croatian Language and Literature was opened at the Regensburg University.

=== Events ===
The Croatian Cultural Association of Bremen organizes summer music and dance festival “Sommerfest in Hastedt”.

The annual concert of Croatian musicians known as ”Hrvatska noć” (Croatian Night) is one of the biggest gatherings of Croats. In December 2023 it took place at the Fraport Arena in Frankfurt am Main.

== Academia ==
Croatian Academic Union Germany (Hrvatski akademski savez) is a network of students and academics in Germany who are Croatians or of Croatian descent.

== Notable Croatians and people of Croatian descent in Germany ==
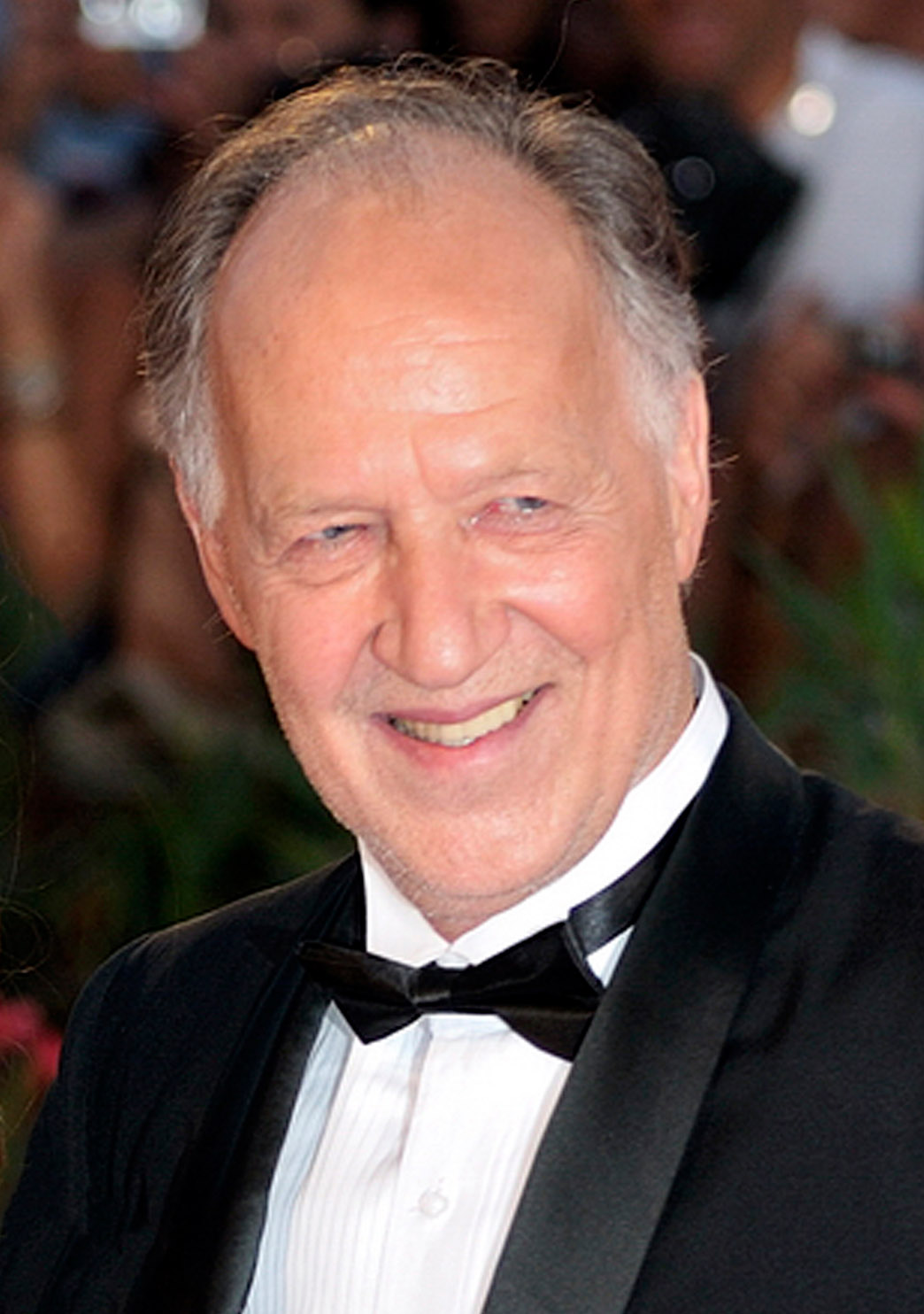
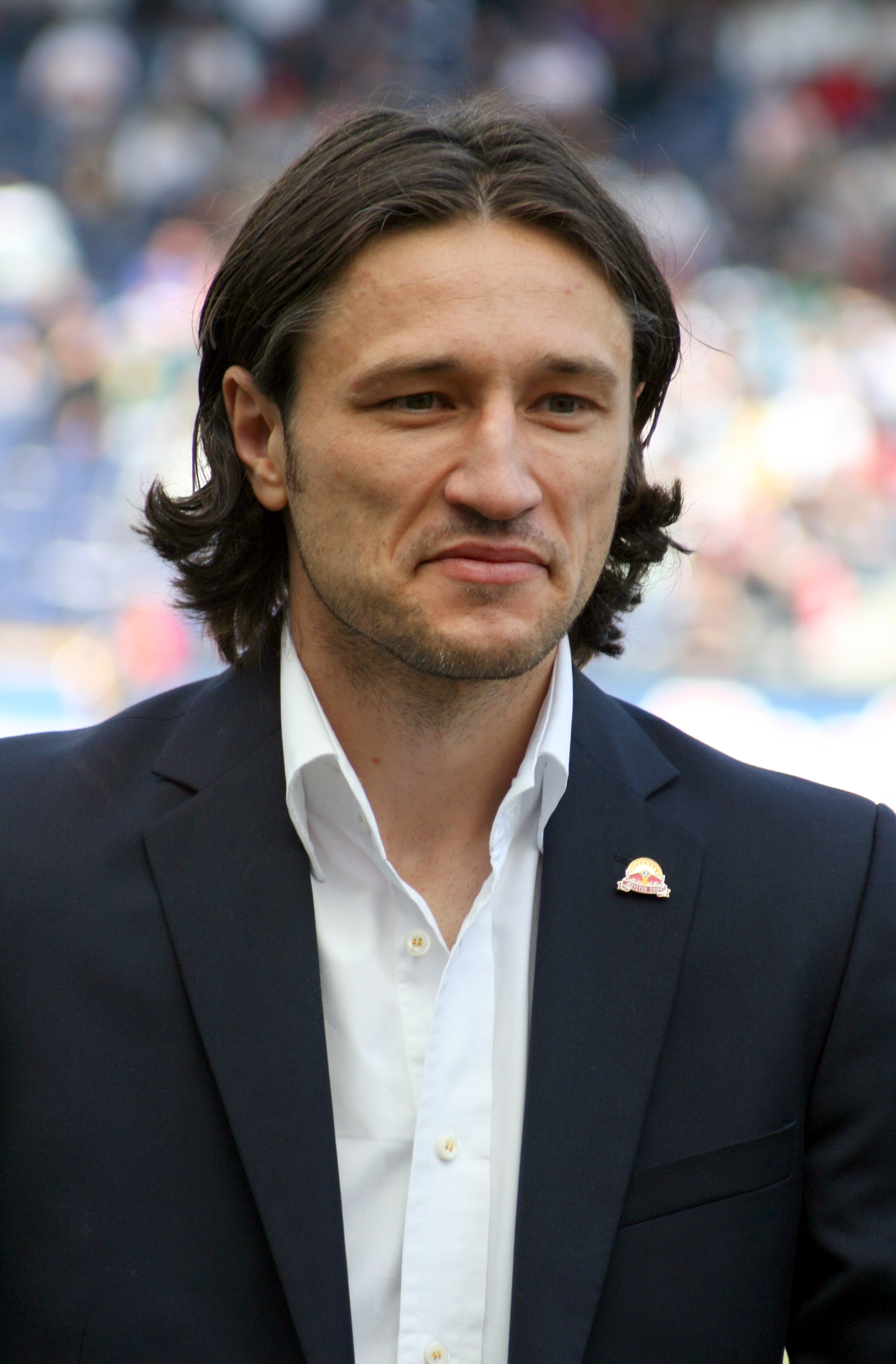
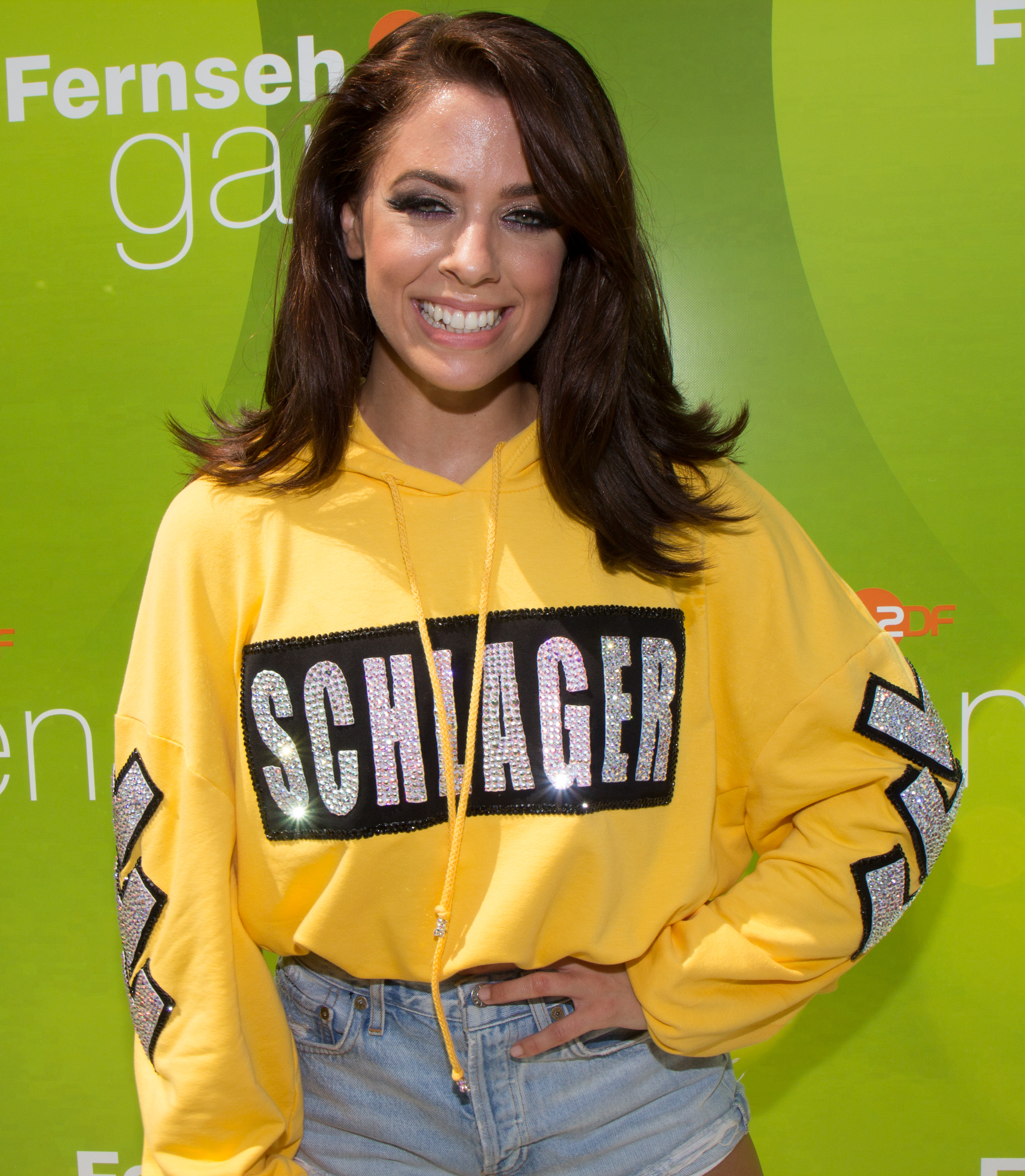
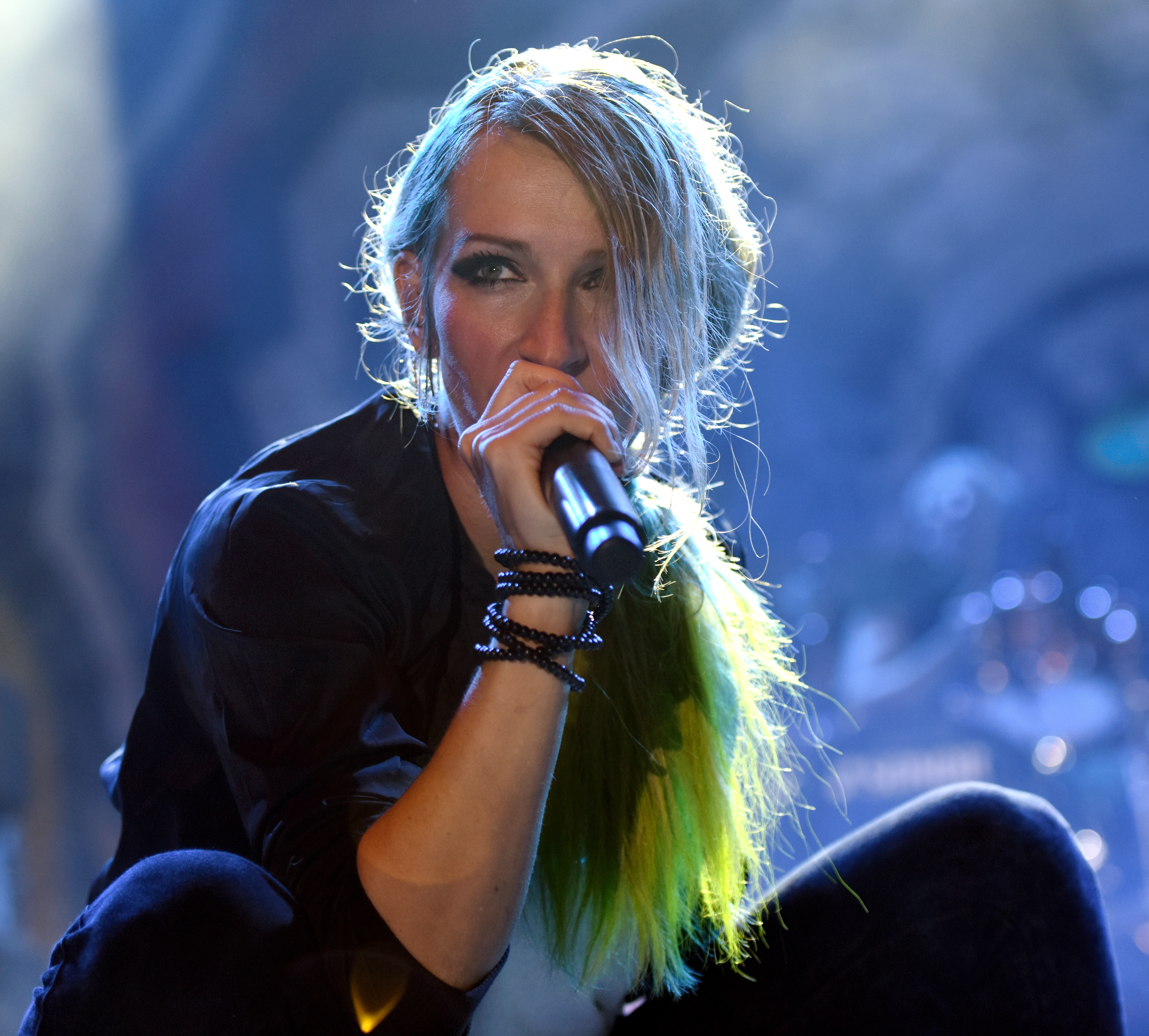
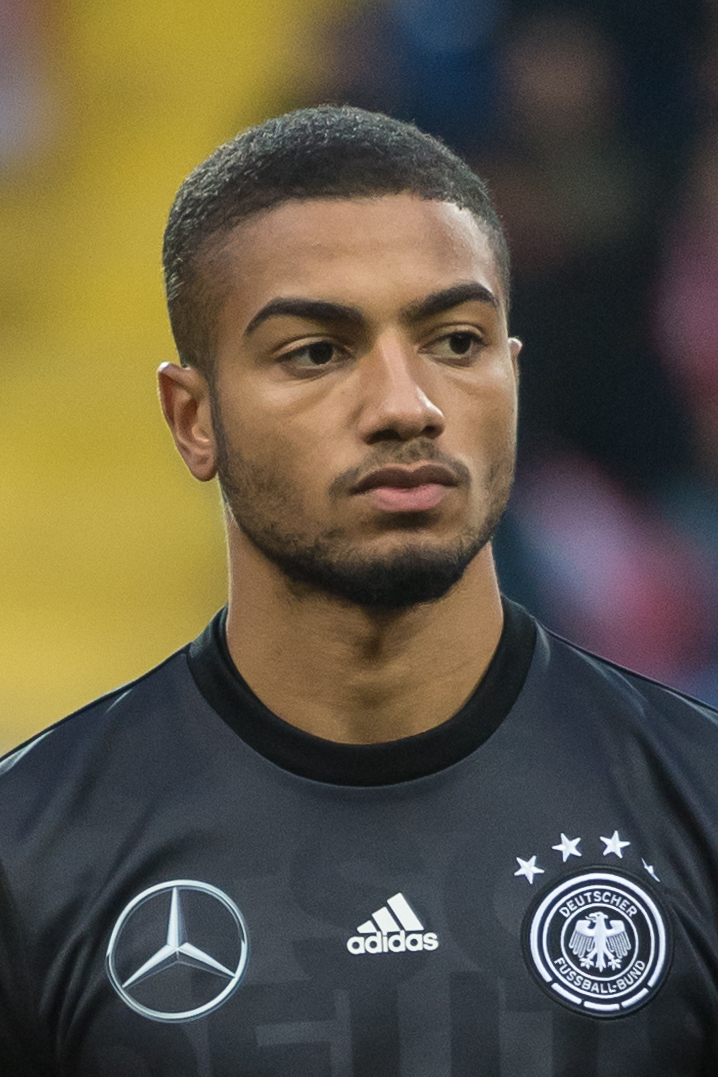
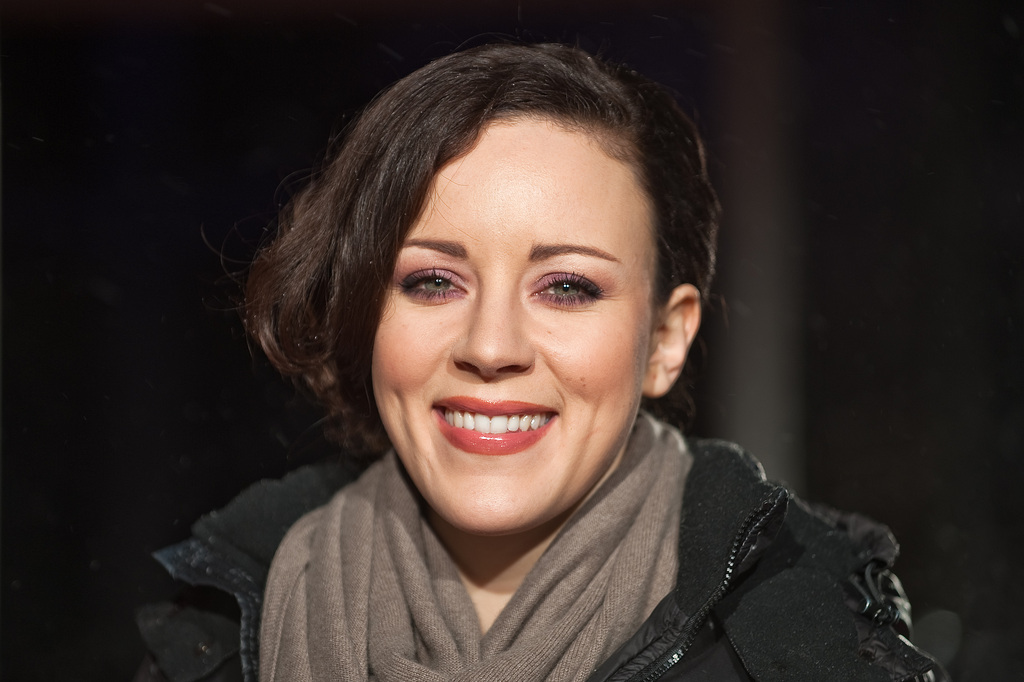
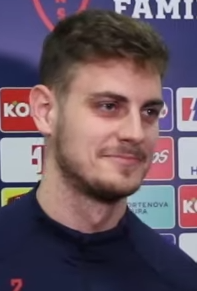
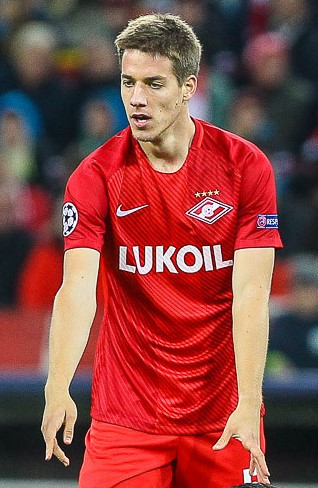
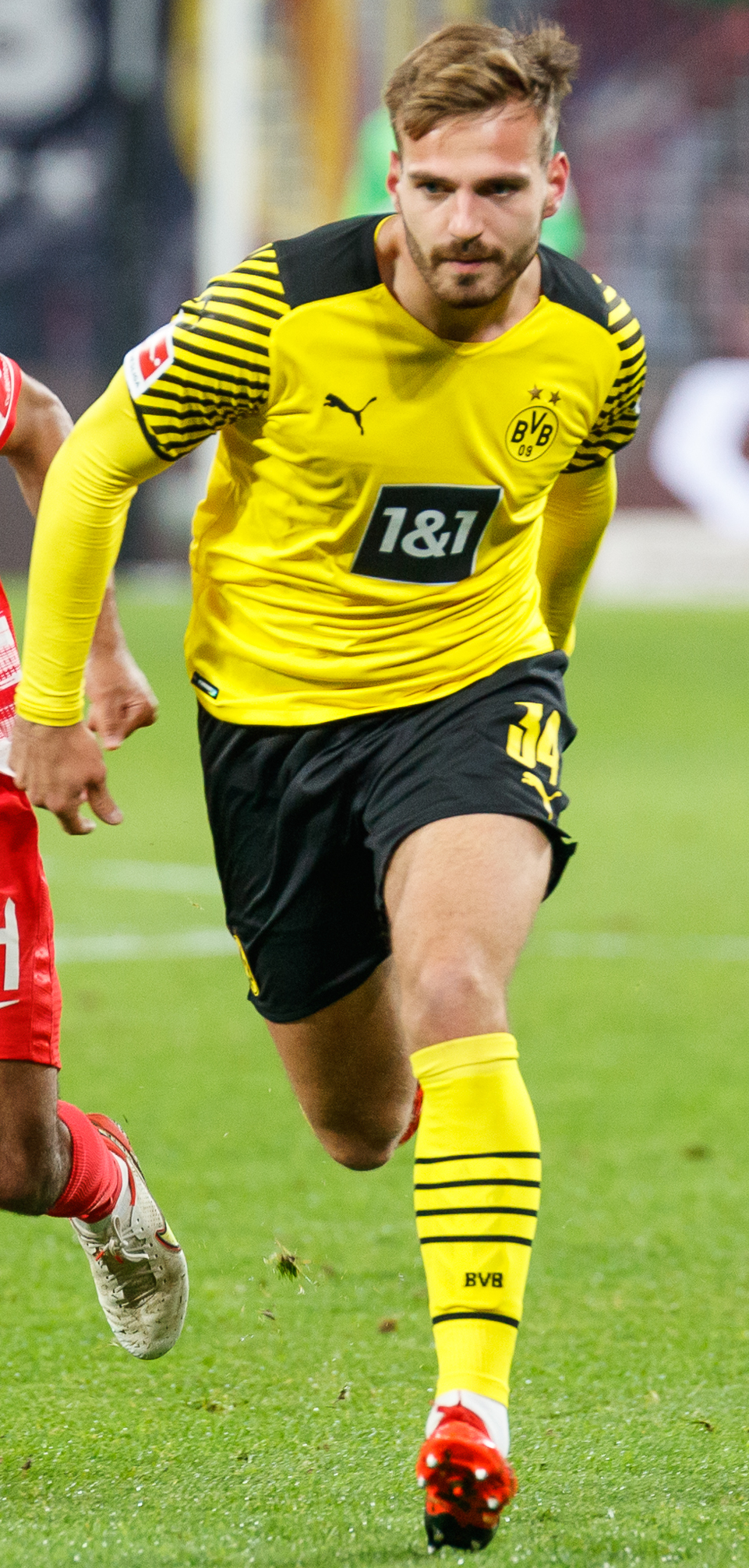
Werner Herzog	Niko Kovač	Vanessa Mai	Sandra Nasić	Jeremy Toljan	Jasmin Wagner
Josip Stanišić	Mario Pašalić	Marin Pongračić

- Fredi Bobic, former footballer
- Stipe Erceg, actor
- Werner Herzog, film director
- Milko Kelemen, professor at the Stuttgarter Musikakademie Stuttgart
- Ivan Klasnić, footballer
- Niko Kovač, football coach and former player
- Robert Kovač, football coach and former player
- Vanessa Mai, singer
- Sandra Nasić, singer for the rock band, Guano Apes
- Ivo Robić, musician
- Zvonimir Serdarušić, handball coach
- Edin Terzić, football coach and former player
- Jeremy Toljan, football player
- Josip Stanišić, football player
- Jasmin Wagner, singer
- Nikki Adler, boxer
- Marko Grgić, handball player
- Mario Pašalić, football player
- Marin Pongračić, football player

== See also ==
- Croatia–Germany relations
- Croats
- List of Croats
- Immigration to Germany
- Germans of Croatia
- Croats of Switzerland
