= Mexico–Slovenia relations =

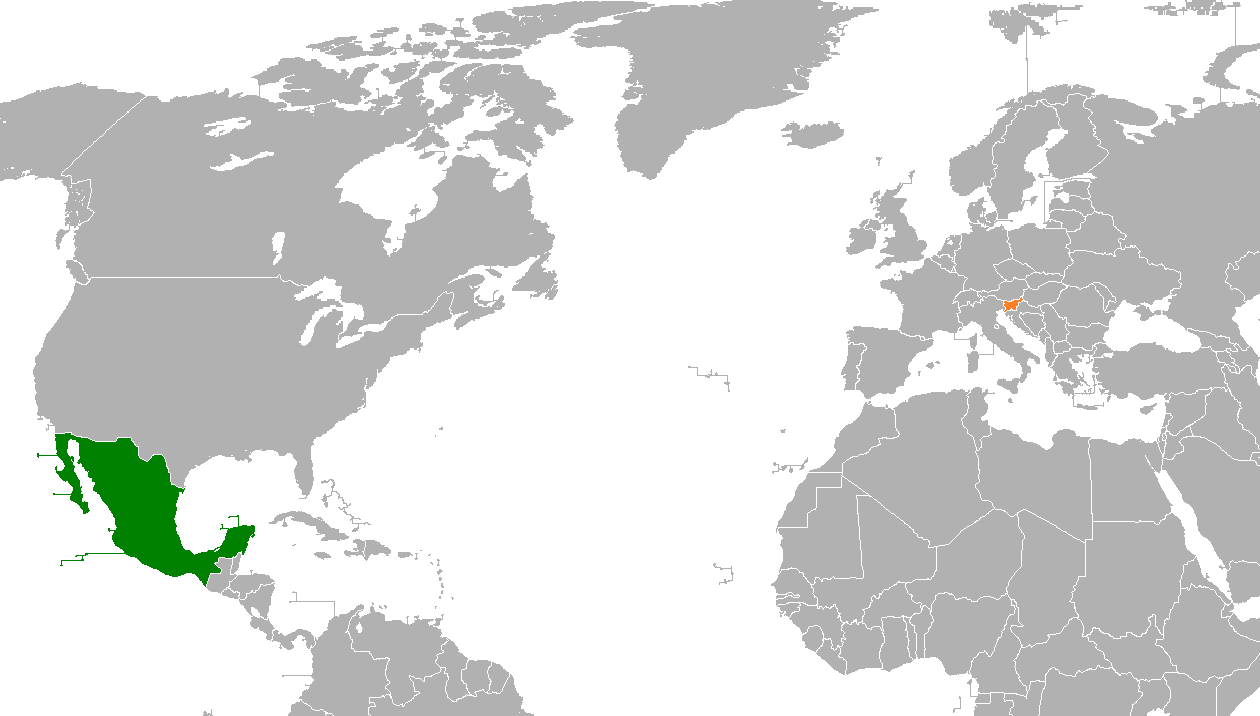

- Mexico: Slovenia

The nations of Mexico and Slovenia established diplomatic relations in 1992. Both nations are members of the Organisation for Economic Co-operation and Development and the United Nations.

== History ==
Mexico recognized the newly independent Slovenia on 22 May 1992. In 1996, Mexico opened an honorary consulate in Ljubljana. In 1998, Slovene Ambassador, Dimitrij Rupel, declared that there are deep bilateral relations between his country and Mexico, and that Slovenia will support Mexico in any international forum, since Mexico is part of the North American Free Trade Agreement (NAFTA), which provides opportunities to increase commerce and investments between Slovenia and North America. In October 1998, Prime Minister Janez Drnovšek became the first Slovene head of state to visit Mexico.

In August 2003, both nations participated in the Mixed Commission for Cooperation in the fields of Education and Culture. Both sides underlined that the session of the Mixed Commission presented a good opportunity for the establishment of foundations for mutual relations in the fields of education, science, culture and sport, as well as for reflection on the role of international co-operation as a factor for social change and as an essential means for the realization of global and sustainable development of countries. To this end, the signatories started a program of cooperation for the period 2003 to 2007, in which the two countries agreed on mutual collaboration in the fields of primary, secondary, post-secondary and higher education; scholarship and residential exchange programs.

In May 2006, Mexican President Vicente Fox met with Slovene Prime Minister Janez Janša in Vienna, where both leaders were attending the IV Latin America, the Caribbean and the European Union Summit. In December 2007, Foreign Minister Patricia Espinosa Cantellano became the highest-level Mexican official to visit Slovenia and she met with Slovene Prime Minister Janez Janša. In September 2016, Mexican President Enrique Peña Nieto had a brief meeting with Slovene President Borut Pahor in Jerusalem.

In 2023, both nations celebrated 31 years of diplomatic relations.

== High-level visits ==
High-level visits from Mexico to Slovenia

- Foreign Undersecretary Lourdes Aranda Bezaury (2004)
- Foreign Secretary Patricia Espinosa Cantellano (December 2007)

High-level visits from Slovenia to Mexico

- Foreign State Secretary Ignac Golob (August 1996)
- Prime Minister Janez Drnovšek (October 1998)
- Foreign Minister Dimitrij Rupel (May 2004)

== Bilateral agreements ==
Both nations have signed a few bilateral agreements such as an Agreement on Educational and Cultural Cooperation (1996) and a Memorandum of Understanding for the Establishment of a Mechanism of Consultation in Matters of Mutual Interest (1996).

== Trade ==
In 1997, Mexico signed a Free Trade Agreement with the European Union (which includes Slovenia). In 2023, two-way trade between both nations amounted to US$241.8 million. Mexico's exports to Slovenia include: chemicals, automobile parts, tequila and beer. Slovenia's main exports to Mexico include: automobile and machinery parts and computer wires. A few Slovenian companies, such as Kolektor, currently operate in Mexico.

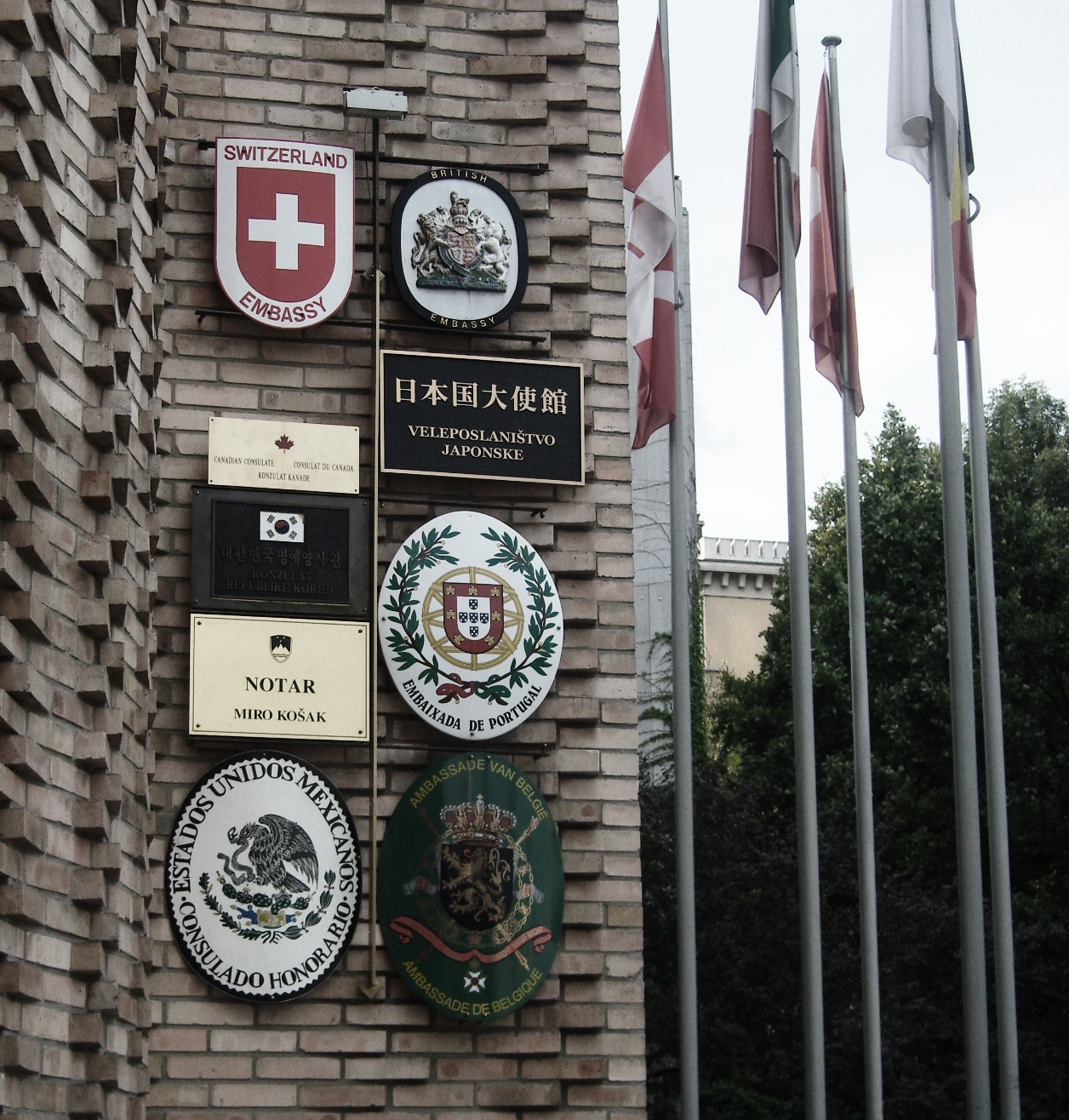
Honorary Consulate of Mexico in Ljubljana

== Non-resident diplomatic missions ==
- Mexico is accredited to Slovenia from its embassy in Vienna, Austria and has an honorary consulate in Ljubljana.
- Slovenia is accredited to Mexico from its embassy in Washington, D.C.; United States, and has honorary consulates in Mexico City and in Guadalajara.

== See also ==
- Foreign relations of Mexico
- Foreign relations of Slovenia
- Mexico–Yugoslavia relations
