= Mexico–Yugoslavia relations =

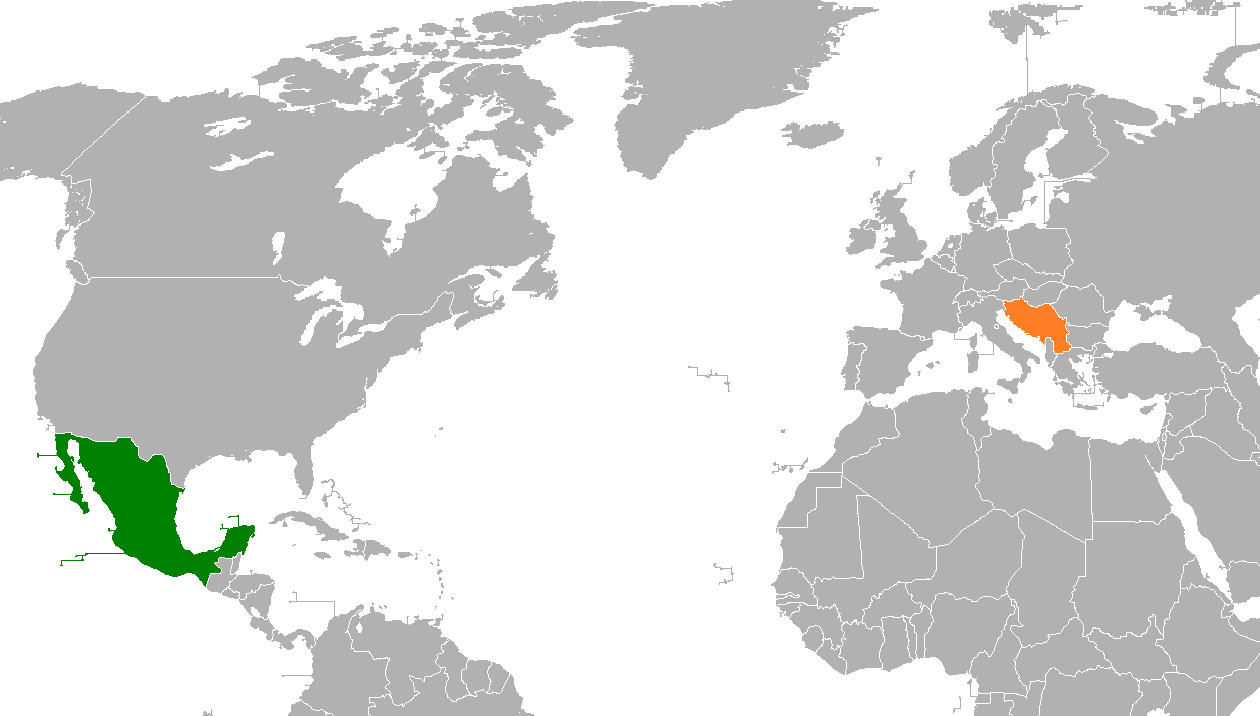

- Mexico: Yugoslavia

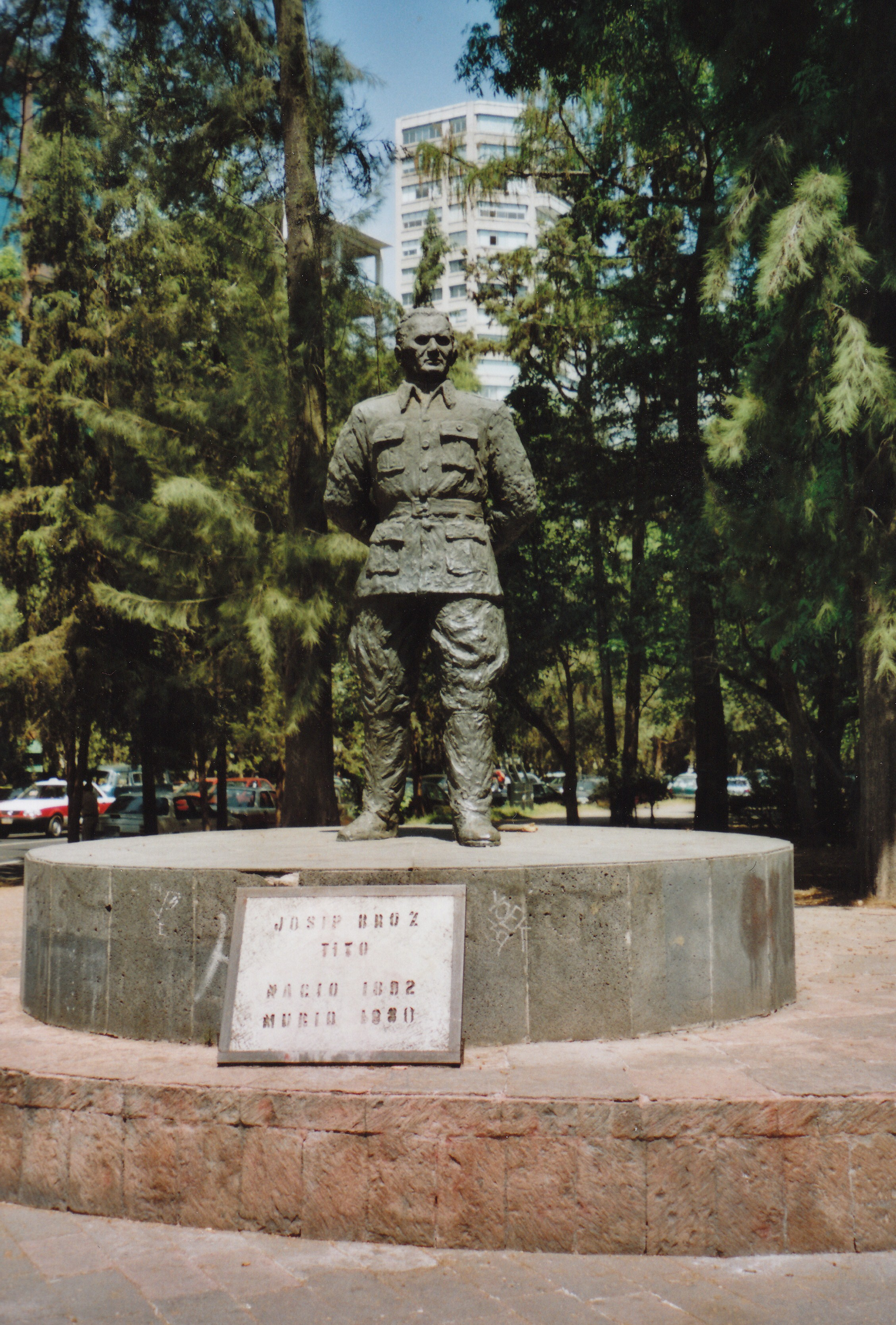
Statue of Josip Broz Tito in Mexico City

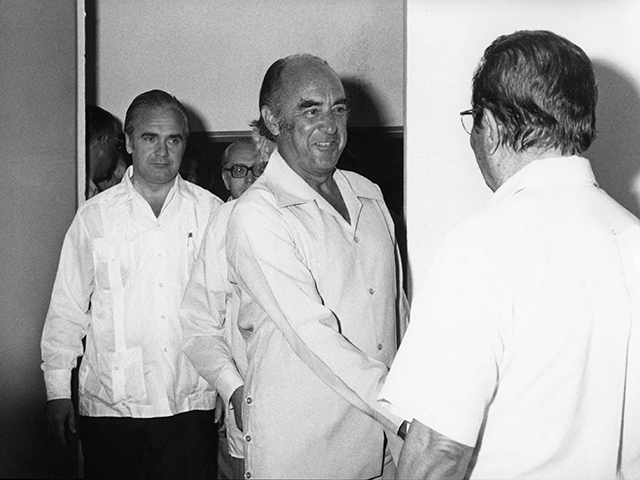
President Josip Broz Tito with José López Portillo

Mexico and Yugoslavia established diplomatic relations on 24 May 1946 on the initiative of Yugoslav Prime Minister (later President) Josip Broz Tito. Both countries shared their views on Francoist Spain and cooperated with the Spanish Republican government in exile. On 31 July 1952 the two countries protested strongly against a decision of a United Nations committee to ask the Franco Government what it might be able to do to strengthen the collective security.

== Breakup of Yugoslavia ==
In the initial aftermath of the breakup of Yugoslavia, Mexico maintained its diplomatic relations with newly established Federal Republic of Yugoslavia (Serbia and Montenegro) but reduced its level to the charge d'affaires due to host country involvement in Bosnian War. Following the United Nations Security Council Resolution 757 Mexico refused the entry of any Yugoslav official and banned its government officials from traveling to Federal Republic of Yugoslavia. Mexico however maintained its embassy in Belgrade and established formal relations with Serbia and Montenegro and other successor states.

== List of bilateral state visits ==
=== Yugoslav visits to Mexico ===
- October 1963: Josip Broz Tito
- March 1976: Josip Broz Tito
- October 1981: Lazar Mojsov (North–South Summit)

=== Mexican visits to Yugoslavia ===
- March 1963: Adolfo López Mateos
- February 1974: Luis Echeverría Álvarez
- January 1985: Miguel de la Madrid Hurtado

== See also ==
- Yu-Mex
- Yugoslavia and the Non-Aligned Movement
- Yugoslavia at the 1968 Summer Olympics
- Mexico at the 1984 Winter Olympics
- Death and state funeral of Josip Broz Tito
- Croatia–Mexico relations
- Mexico–Serbia relations
- Mexico–Slovenia relations
- Yugoslav volunteers in the Spanish Civil War
