= Gandaulim Fort =

- Part of Goa
- Ilhas de Goa, India
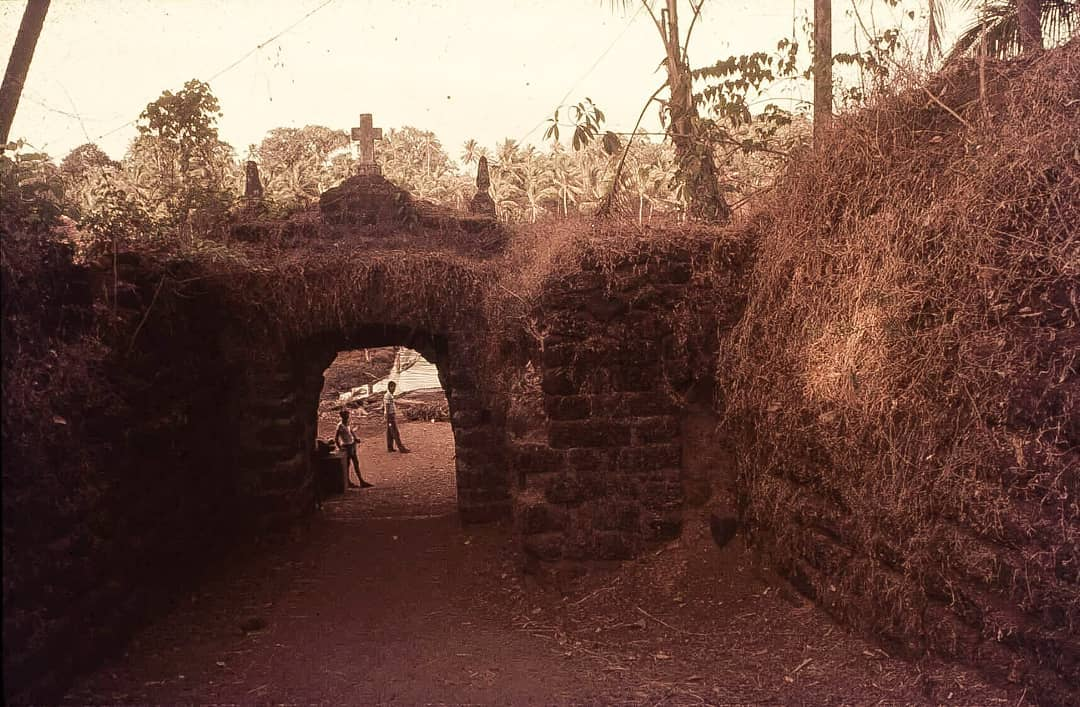
- Gandaulim Fort Entrance Gate in the 1990s

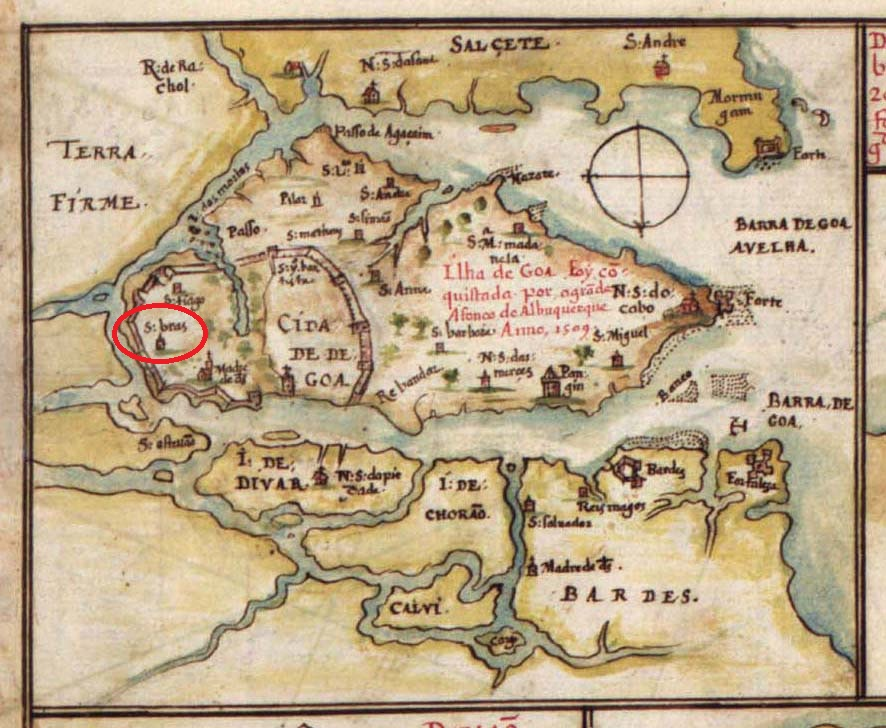
- Location of São Braz in Ilhas de Goa

Site information
- Type: Fort
- Owner: Government of Goa
- Controlled by: India
- Open to the public: Yes
- Condition: Abandoned Ruins

Location
- Coordinates of the ruins Gandaulim Fort (India)
- Coordinates: 15.513819°N 73.943577°E
- Height: 20 m

Site history
- Built: 1537
- Materials: Laterite stones and mud
- Demolished: Yes
- Battles/wars: unknown
- Events: Demolished in the 2000s

Garrison information
- Current commander: n/a
- Garrison: n/a
- Occupants: none

The Gandaulim Fort, also called the Gaudelupchar Fort was a military installation built on the eastern tip of the Ilhas de Goa. It is believed to date from the 16th-century. The fortress was allegedly built to defend the settlement of São Braz (lit. 'St. Blaise'). It also housed a chapel dedicated to St. Blaise, which later was elevated into a church in 1563.

== Demolition ==
By the advent of the 21st century, the only remaining evidence of the fort consisted of its entrance gate and a few rundown walls. The gate was demolished by the government authorities, as part of a road expansion project, to widen the approach road to the Gandaulim-Cumbarjua ferry.

== Gallery ==
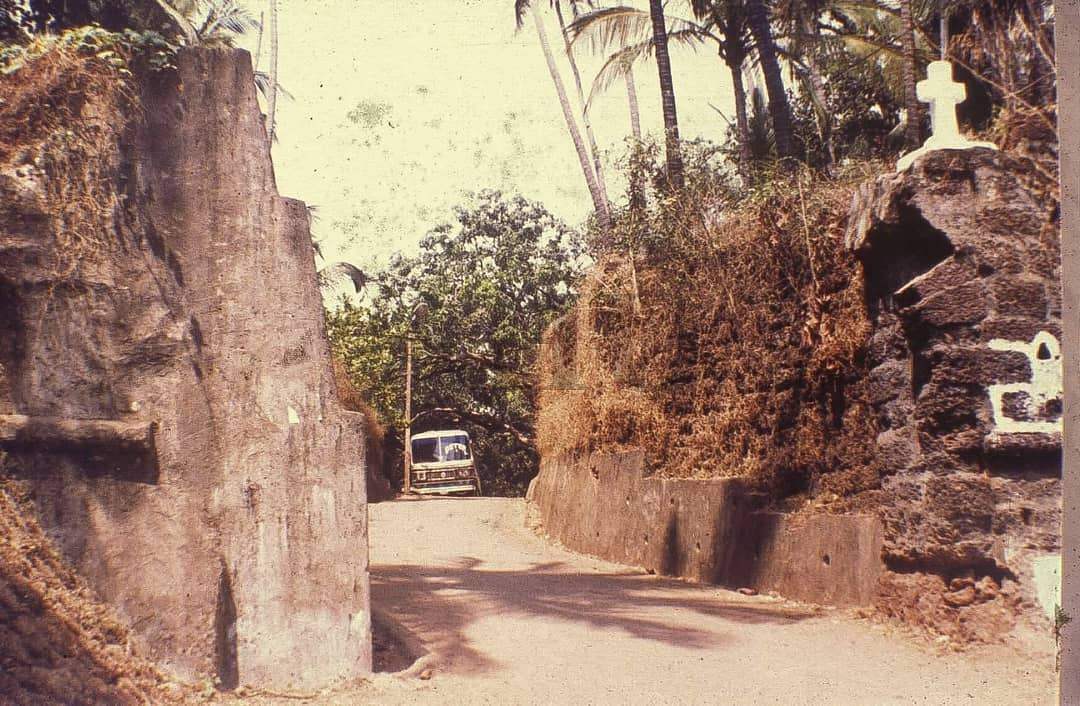
Gandaulim Fort Entrance Gate after Demolition

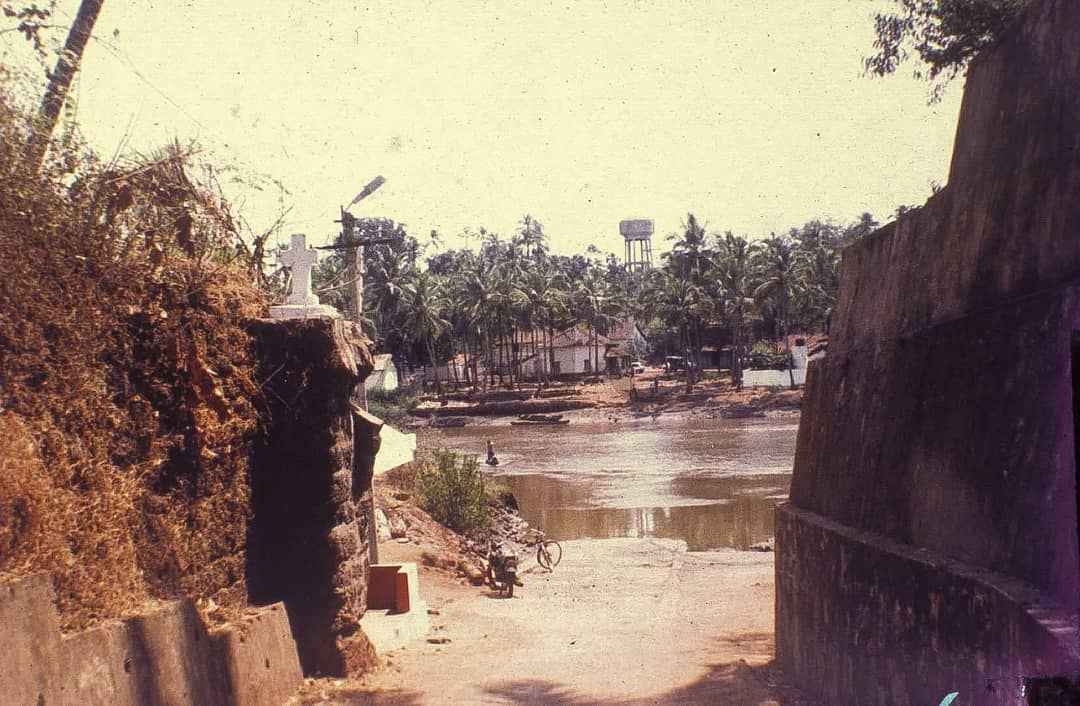
Gandaulim Fort Entrance Gate post Demolition

== See also ==
- Gandaulim
