= Mexico–Serbia relations =

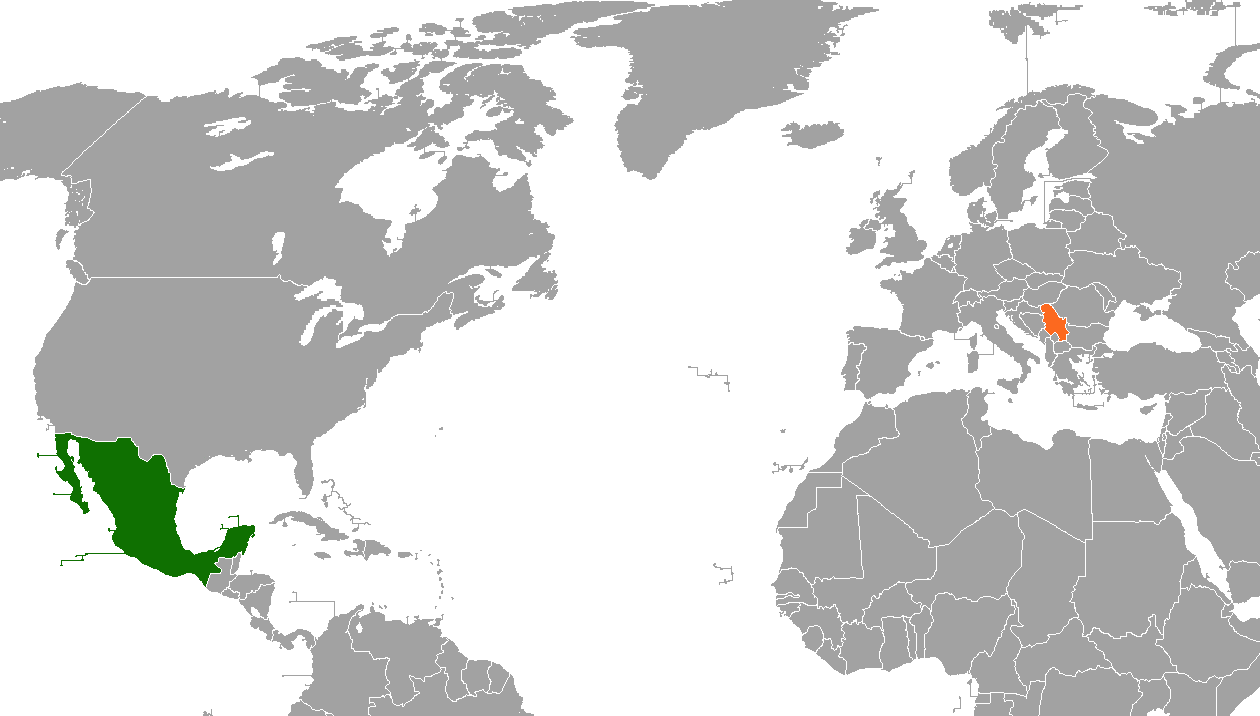

- Mexico: Serbia

Mexico and Serbia maintain diplomatic relations established between Mexico and the Socialist Federal Republic of Yugoslavia in 1946. From 1946 to 2006, Mexico maintained relations with the Socialist Federal Republic of Yugoslavia (SFRY), and the Federal Republic of Yugoslavia (FRY) (later Serbia and Montenegro), of which Serbia is considered shared (SFRY) or sole (FRY) legal successor.

Both nations were founding members of the Group of 77 and the United Nations.

== History ==
Originally, Mexico and the Socialist Federal Republic of Yugoslavia established diplomatic relations on 24 May 1946. In 1951, Mexico opened a resident embassy in Belgrade.

In March 1963, Mexican President Adolfo López Mateos paid an official visit to Yugosalvia. During President López Mateos visit, Mexico awarded its highest honor, the Order of the Aztec Eagle, to President Josip Broz Tito. The visit was soon reciprocated when in October 1963, Yugoslav President Tito paid an official visit to Mexico. Since the initial visits, there have been several high-level visits between leaders of both nations.

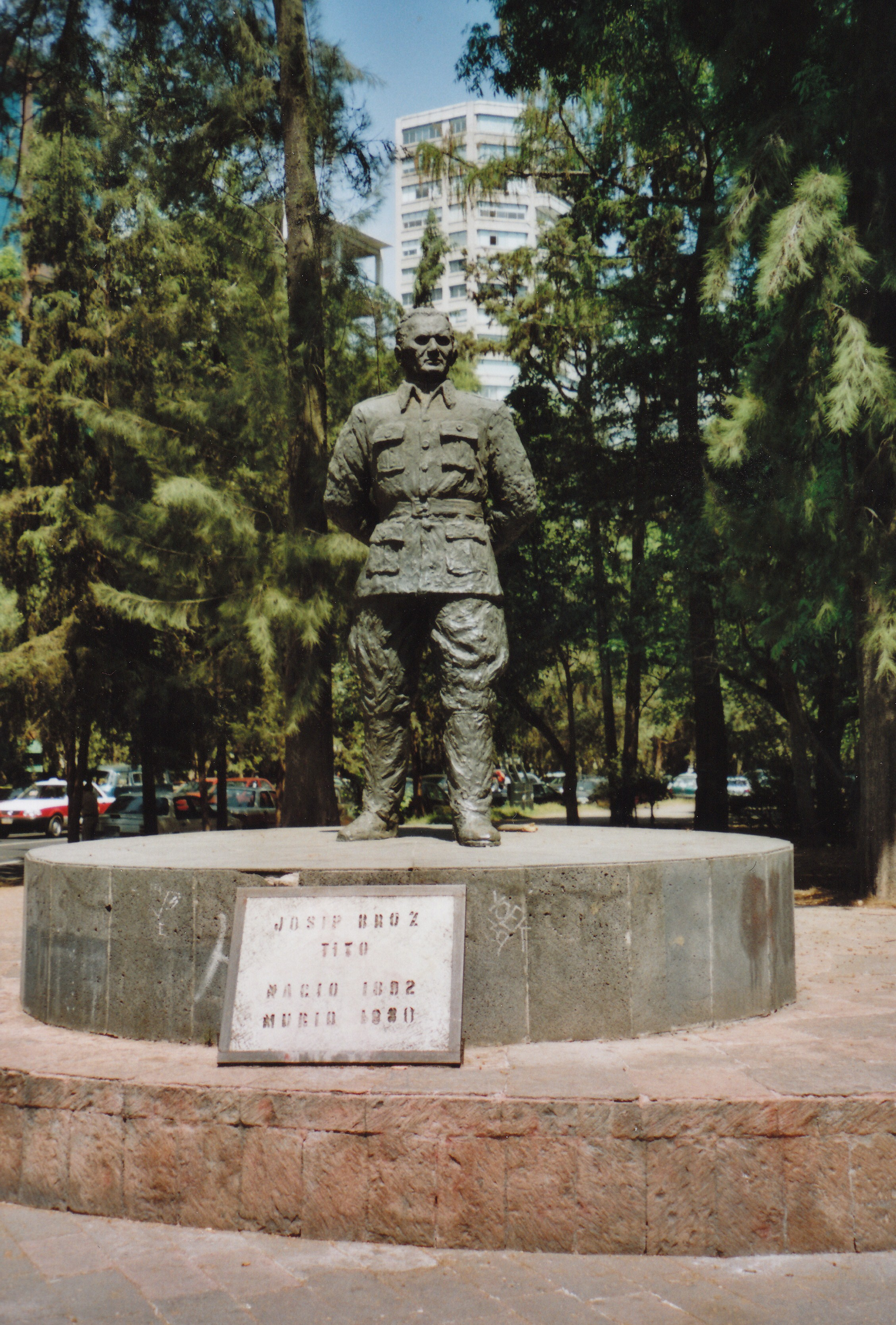
Memorial to Josip Broz Tito in Mexico City

In 1991, Yugoslavia entered into a series of ethnic conflicts known as the Yugoslav wars. During the war, the United Nations Security Council passed Resolution 757 calling all nations to remove their diplomatic staff from Belgrade. As a result, Mexico downgraded its embassy to that of a Chargé d'affaires and refused the entry of any Yugoslav official wishing to visit Mexico. Furthermore, Mexican government officials were not allowed to travel to Yugoslavia. By doing so, however, Mexico remained one of the few countries that opted not to close its embassy in Belgrade. In 1995, Mexico elevated its diplomatic mission in Belgrade back to an embassy and established diplomatic relations with the Federal Republic of Yugoslavia (reconstituted in 2003 into the State Union Serbia and Montenegro); and with the other newly independent successor nations of Bosnia and Herzegovina, Croatia, Slovenia, and the North Macedonia.

In 2006, the State Union Serbia and Montenegro dissolved and created two separate nations: the Republic of Serbia and Montenegro. That same year, Mexico recognized the independence of Montenegro and continues to maintain diplomatic relations with the Republic of Serbia. Mexico has not recognized Kosovo since it declared its independence from Serbia in 2008.

In 2021, Mexico and Serbia celebrated 75 years of diplomatic relations. In 2024, both nations held their VII Meeting of the Political Consultation Mechanism in Belgrade which addressed initiatives to enhance bilateral economic and tourism exchanges, along with possible cooperation programs in the cultural, educational, scientific and sports fields, among others.

There is a street named “Mexican Street” in Belgrade Waterfront, opened in 2025.

== High-level visits ==
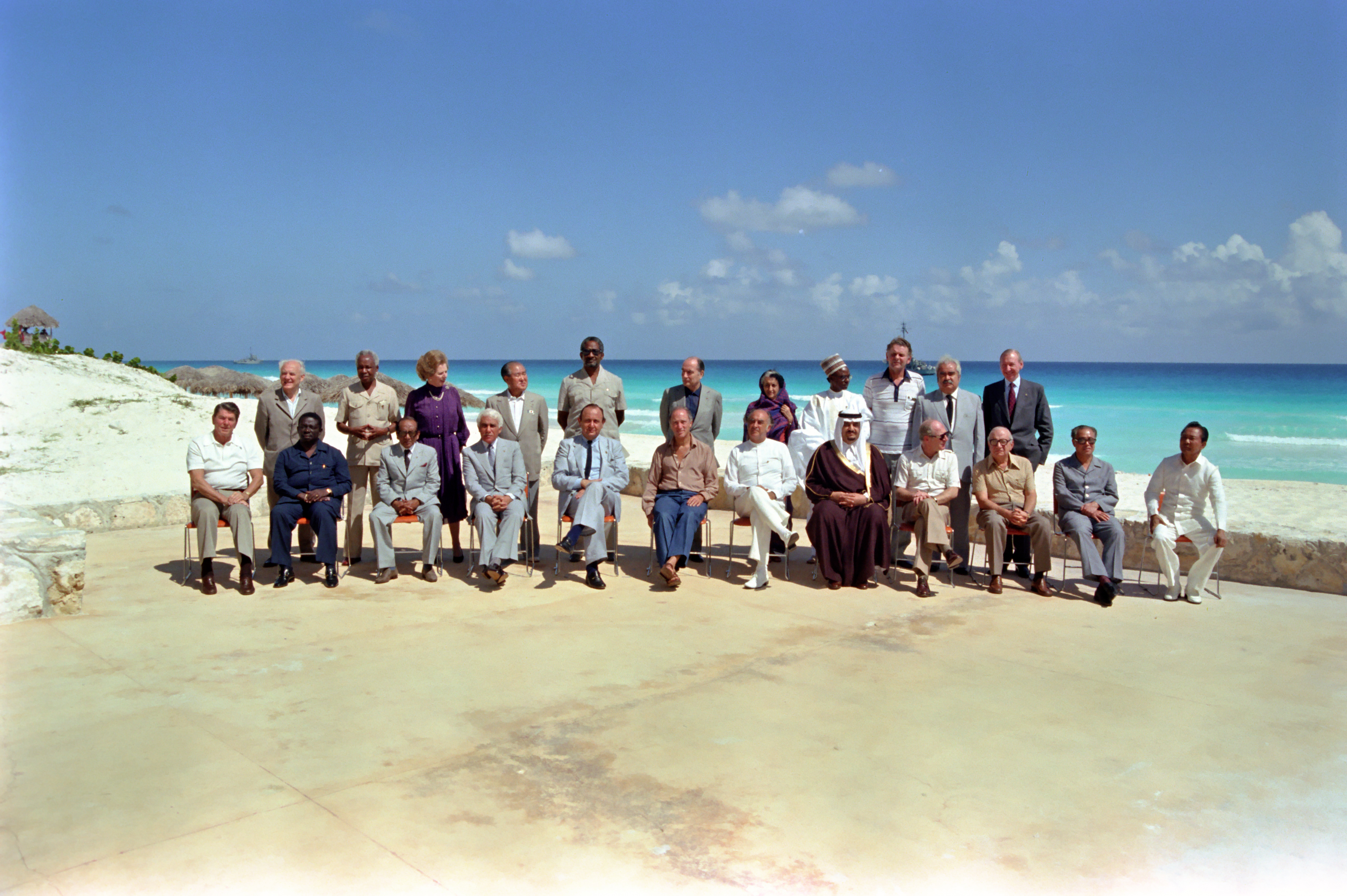
President of Mexico, José López Portillo, and President of Yugoslavia, Sergej Kraigher, North–South Summit in Cancún, 1981

From Mexico to the Yugoslavia/Serbia

- President Adolfo López Mateos (1963)
- President Luis Echeverría Álvarez (1974)
- President Miguel de la Madrid Hurtado (1985)
- Foreign Undersecretary Miguel Marín Bosch (2002)
- Secretary of Health José Ángel Córdova (2009)
- Foreign Secretary Patricia Espinosa Cantellano (2011)

From Yugoslavia/Serbia to Mexico

- President Josip Broz Tito (1963, 1976)
- President Sergej Kraigher (1981)
- President Lazar Mojsov (1987)
- Foreign Minister Goran Svilanović (2003)
- Foreign Minister Vuk Jeremić (2008, 2011)
- Deputy Foreign Minister Zoran Vujić (2008)
- First Deputy Prime Minister Ivica Dačić (2010, 2015, 2024)
- Foreign Minister Nikola Selaković (2021)

== Bilateral agreements ==
Agreements between Mexico and Yugoslavia are being carried forward into agreements between Mexico and Serbia. Both nations signed several bilateral agreements such as an Agreement on trade relations (1950); Agreement cultural exchanges (1960); Agreement on Scientific and Technical Cooperation (1974); Memorandum of understanding establishing a mechanism for consultation on matters of mutual interest (2002); Agreement for the abolition of visas on diplomatic and official passports (2003); and an Agreement on Educational, Cultural and Sports Cooperation (2020).

== Economic relations ==
In 2023, two-way trade between Mexico and Serbia amounted to US$128 million. Mexico's main exports to Serbia include: air pumps or vacuum pumps, machinery, telephones and mobile phones, caps and lids, pipes and fittings, chemical based products, clothing, fish, and alcohol. Serbia's main exports to Mexico include: parts of apparatus for protecting electrical circuits, motors and generators, electrical wires and cables, base metal, aluminum rods, chemical based products, parts and accessories for motor vehicles, and plastic.

Mexican companies present in Serbia include telecommunications company América Móvil (the principal owner of A1 Telekom Austria Group, operating in Serbia under A1 Srbija) and bakery product manufacturing company Grupo Bimbo (the largest bakery company in Serbia).

== Resident diplomatic missions ==
- Mexico has an embassy in Belgrade.
- Serbia has an embassy in Mexico City.
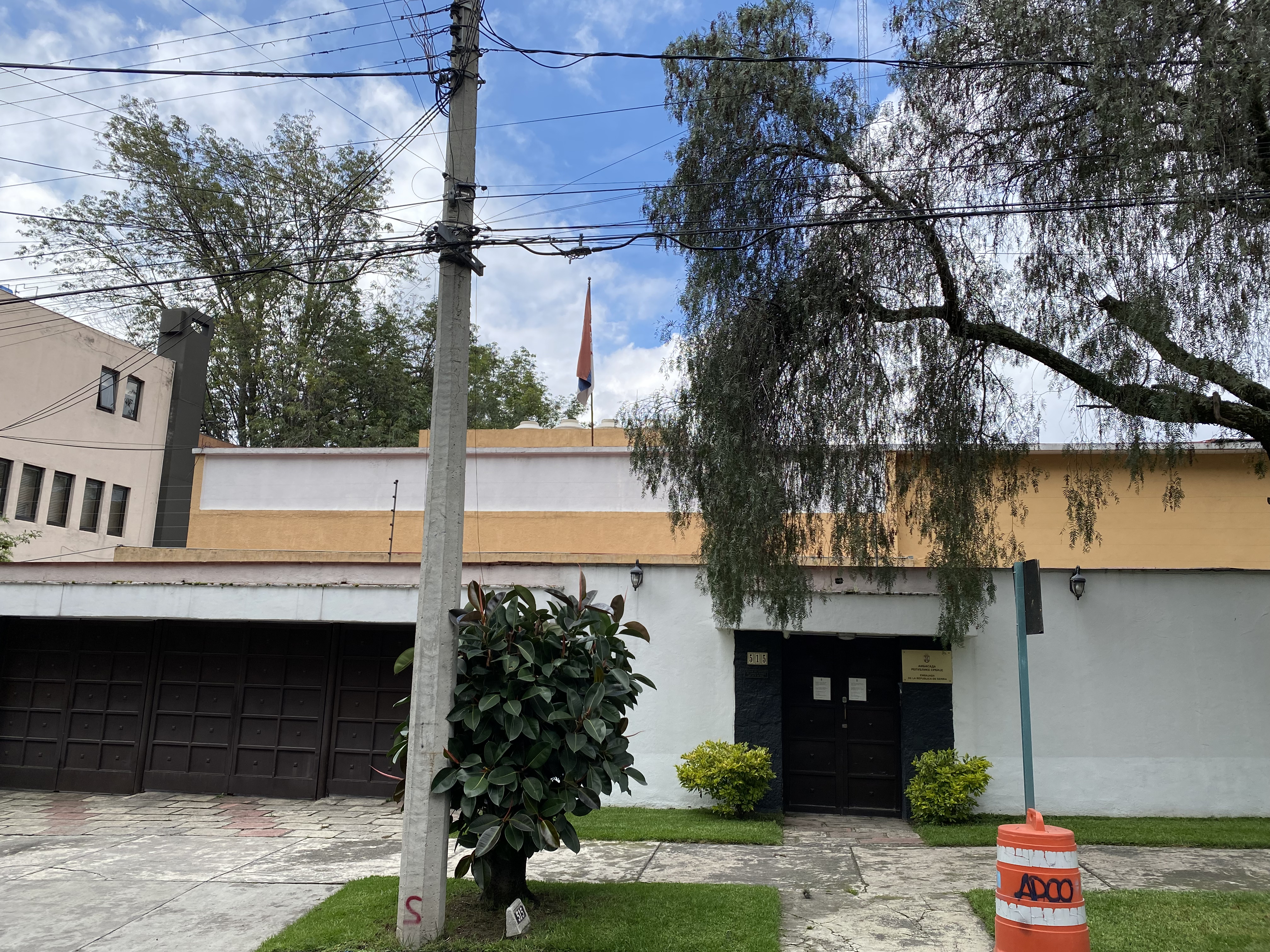
Embassy of Serbia in Mexico City

== See also ==
- Foreign relations of Mexico
- Foreign relations of Serbia
- Mexico–Yugoslavia relations
- Yu-Mex
