= Zdravka Matišić =

Croatian Indologist (born 1944)

- Born: 16 May 1944 (age 82); Travnik
- Known for: Literary scholarship

Academic background
- Education: Zagreb University

Academic work
- Notable works: Elements of Hindi Grammar (1996) (Croatian: Elementi hindske gramatike), the only manual for Hindi in Croatian

Zdravka Matišić (born 16 June 1944, Travnik) is a Croatian Indologist and Professor at the Department of Oriental Studies and Hungarian Studies at the Faculty of Philosophy at Zagreb University.

She is known for her work in both Sanskrit and modern Indian literature, her translations from Sanskrit, including a 1980 translation of Pañcatantra, and her linguistic study of the Hindi language.

In 1996, she authored Elements of Hindi Grammar, the only manual for Hindi in Croatian.

She is also active in historical research, including on the contributions of Croatian missionaries in India, and authored the 2007 work Joy, Fear, Dedication: Contributions to the biography of Ivan Filip Vesdin Paulin and Sancto Bartholomaeo (Croatian: Radost, strah, predanost: Prilozi za biografiju Ivana Filipa Vesdina Paulina a Sancto Bartholomaeo).

She co-authored India and Tibet by Nikola Ratkay (2002) (Croatian: Indije i Tibet Nikole Ratkaja) with Mate Križman.

== Bibliography ==
=== Author ===
- Matišić, Zdravka (1996). Elements of Hindi Grammar [Elementi hindske gramatike] (in Croatian). Ibis grafika. ISBN 9789539657701.
- Matišić, Zdravka (1999). "An intertextual reading of Rushdie's "Haroun and the Sea of Stories"". Studia Romanica et Anglica Zagrabiensia. 44 (1999). Faculty of Literature of the University of Zagreb: 172–196.
- Matišić, Zdravka (2007). Joy, Fear, Dedication: Contributions to the biography of Ivan Filip Vesdin Paulin and Sancto Bartholomaeo [Radost, strah, predanost: Prilozi za biografiju Ivana Filipa Vesdina Paulina a Sancto Bartholomaeo] (in Croatian).

=== Co-author ===
- Križman, Mate; Matišić, Zdravka (2002). India and Tibet by Nikola Ratkay [Indije i Tibet Nikole Ratkaja] (in Croatian). Bibliotheca Orientalica.
