= Ivan Ratkaj =

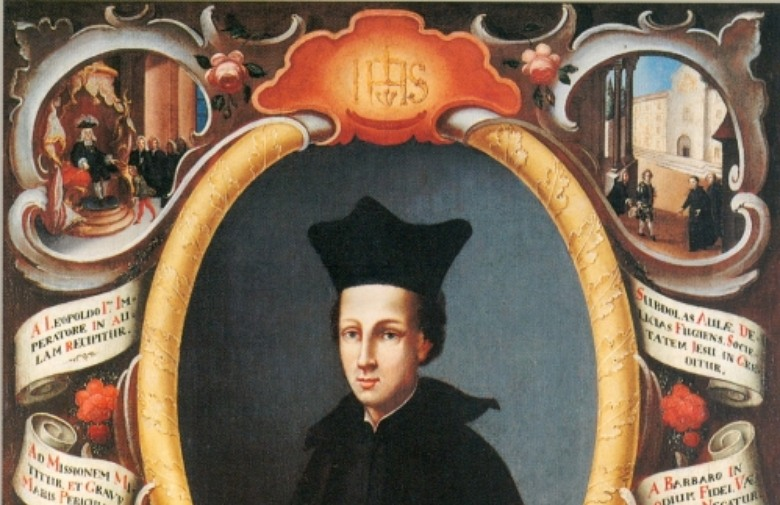
Ivan Ratkaj, memorial portrait with scenes of his life, 1727

Ivan Ratkaj (22 May 1647 – 26 December 1683), also Ivan Rattkay, was a Croatian Jesuit missionary, explorer and cartographer. He wrote the first detailed description of the Tarahumara, a Native Mexican people.

== Biography ==
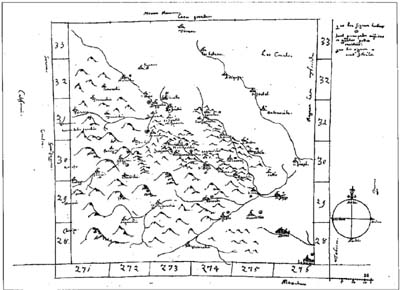
Map of the Tarahumara Province titled Mappa circum iacentes regiones (tarahumaras), drawn by Ratkaj in 1683. The original is kept in the central Jesuit archives in Rome.

Ratkaj was born in Ptuj (Duchy of Styria, now northeastern Slovenia) to the Ratkaj noble family, barons of Veliki Tabor. After graduating from the Gymnasium, he joined the Society of Jesus in 1664. In Graz, he studied philosophy and theology. He also taught Latin for a short time at gymnasiums in Gorizia and Zagreb. When he graduated, his superiors wanted him to continue teaching, but they eventually granted his wish and sent him to be a missionary in Mexico in 1680.

Ratkaj arrived at Veracruz in September 1680. In his reports, written in the form of a diary, he described his sea voyage to Mexico, the land route to the native province of Tarahumara in the north of Mexico (modern-day Mexican state of Chihuahua) and the customs and life of the Tarahumara people. He also drew a map of the region with missions and Spanish forts.

Ratkaj provided the first ethnographic and geographic presentation of the Tarahumara. He learned the native language in a month and moved to Tutuaca, a mission in a poor mountainous area. His reports betray an open curiosity: he noted all kinds of details, not only of nature, but also of the natives and their life. He mostly tries to show the Tarahumara in an objective light. He presents the Tarahumara as a "mild and civilized" people as opposed to some neighboring tribes. But they are "fiercely addicted to magic" like other tribes. He describes his role as spreading God's name among the pagans. He also urged them to abstain from drinking and dissolution.

He died suddenly in Carichic, aged only 36. According to some sources, the Indians may have given him poisoned water to drink, but his contemporaries do not confirm this.

== Sources ==
- Čizmić, Ivan; Klemenčič, Matja (October 2002). "Croatian and Slovene missionaries as inventors and explorers of the American West and Midwest" (PDF). Društvena istraživanja. 11 (4–5 (60–61)): 761–783.
- Na sprudu neznanoga žala (On the Beach of an Unknown Shore) - A radio play inspired by Ratkaj's missionary work
