= Baptismal font of Prince Višeslav =

Early medieval font in Croatia

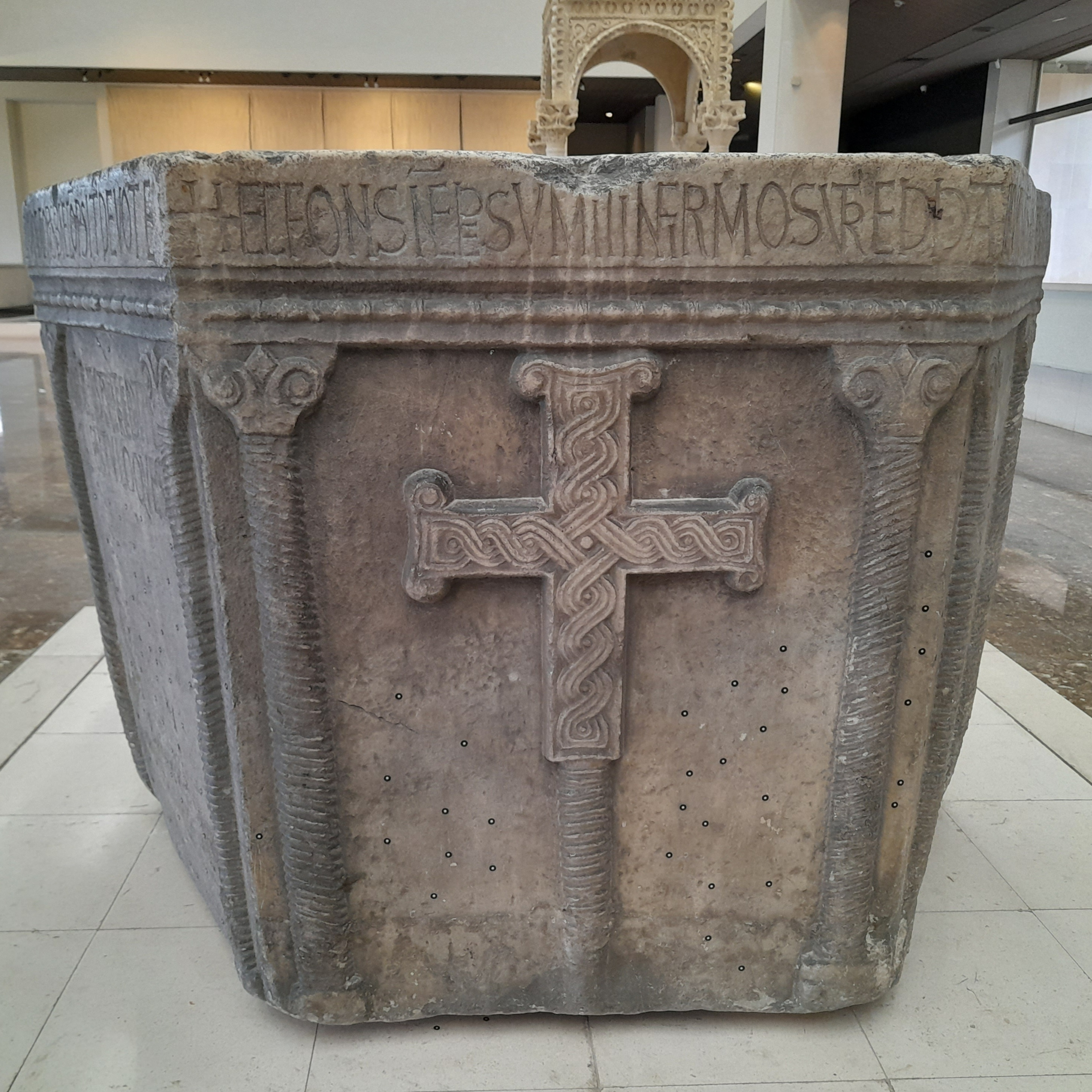
Baptismal font of Duke Višeslav in Museum of Croatian Archaeological Monuments, Split, Croatia.

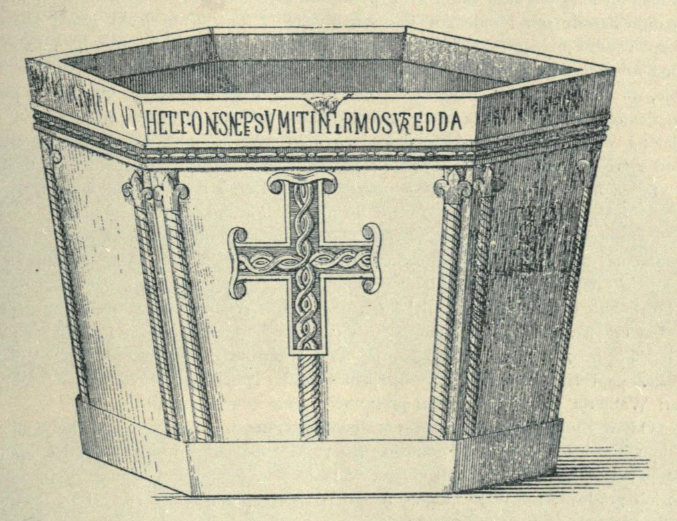
Drawing of the baptismal font (1889)

The Baptismal font of Duke Višeslav is an early medieval baptismal font the inscription of which mentions for the first time a South Slavic duke, Višeslav of Croatia. It is believed to date to the 9th century, and has generally carried historical and cultural significance for Croatia. Its origin and dating are a matter of scientific debate.

== History ==
In 1853 the font came to public prominence when the Capuchin monastery of Il Redentore in Venice gifted it to the Museo Correr. Immediately the Italian historian Giuseppe Valentinelli informed Croatian historian Ivan Kukuljević Sakcinski, who first introduced it to the Croatian scientific public.

In early 1940s, Archbishop of Zagreb Aloysius Stepinac wrote to Patriarch of Venice Adeodato Giovanni Piazza, but couldn't be gifted without state Kingdom of Italy approval, so wrote to Independent State of Croatia minister Mile Budak, and in July 1941 Stepinac was informed that was accepted exchange with two paintings of Vittore Carpaccio from the Strossmayer Gallery of Old Masters, and font arrived in May 1942 to Zagreb. From then on and long after the World War II, the font stood in the atrium of the Palace of Croatian Academy of Sciences and Arts in the state's capital, Zagreb. Since 1958 the font can be seen in the harbor city of Split, in the Museum of Croatian Archaeological Monuments.

In Croatian studies the font has been considered an important historical and cultural significance for Christianity in Croatia and an example of application of Croatian interlace.

The Catholic Church in Croatia has described the inscription as a "shining monument and symbol of the baptism of our Croatian ancestors".

== Form and measurements ==
The baptismal font petrografic analysis from the University of Venice showed it was made of Proconnesus marble. It was cut in the form of hexagon. In one of the side faces, there is an irregular opening (now closed), which was probable used to supply water to the font. The bottom has a round opening for water outflow. There are a few holes at the rim of the top opening that contain iron scraps. Possibly these are the remains of a fastening for a lid or a railing. They probably do not come from the time the font was created.

The font is 90 cm (35 in) high, the diameter of the opening is 136 cm (54 in), the inside depth is 76 cm (30 in), width of each side is approximately 70 cm (28 in), and weights 1,194 kg (2,632 lb).

== Decoration ==
Each of the six sides, except the bottom one, is decorated on the left and on the right with tilted furrows, like a relief column wrapped in a cord with a simple base and a capital with two side volutes. These pillars have a simply profiled architrave, decorated only with plain molding.

On the front central side there is a relief cross styled like a processional cross. The top and both side arms of the cross each have two volutes, but the bottom arm does not. The body of the cross arms is filled with Croatian interlace. The bottom, longer arm of the cross stands on a leg, also filled with tilted furrows, as if wrapped in a cord, which tapers off.

== Inscriptions ==
The architrave, which also forms the hem of the opening, has the Latin inscription:

+ HEC FONS NEMPE SVMIT INFIRMOS VT REDDAT

ILLVMINATOS · HIC EXPIANT SCELERA SVA QVOD

DE PRIMO SVMPSERVNT PARENTE · VT EFFICIANTV

R XPISTICOLE SALVBRITER CONFITENDO TRINVM PER

HENNE · HOC IOHANNES PRESBITER SVB TEMPORE VVISSAS

CLAVO DVCI OPVS BENE COMPOSVIT DEVOTE

On the fifth side of the font, i.e. under the fifth line of the above, one can read:

IN HONORE VIDELICET SANCTI

The sixth side bears the end of the inscription with two lines:

IOHANNIS BAPTISTE, VT INTERCEDAT PRO EO

CLIENTVLOQVE SVO

The inscription can be translated as follows:

This source of water/font receives the weak in order to enlighten them. Here they are cleansed of their sins, which they have inherited from their first parent, to be Christians soberly confessing the eternal Trinity. This work of piety was created by John the Priest at the time of Duke Višeslav, and in honour of St. John the Baptist, to intercede on behalf of him and his flock.

The inscription is done with regular rustic capitals and the height of the letters varies between 6.0 and 6.5 cm (2.4 and 2.6 in). The stonemason used many ligatures, contractions, suspensions, and abbreviation characters for TRINVM ("Trinity") and special characters for word part PER in the word PERHENNE ("eternal"). It possibly has substantial Carolingian-Northern Italian influences.

== Dating ==
The dating of creation based on artistic and paleographic analyses is usually concluded to be in the early 9th century (800-830 CE), or mid-to-late 9th century, while other dating is discarded by now.

=== Personalities ===
Another set of dispute regarding the dating was identification of two historical personalities mentioned on the font, duke "Vuissasclavo" and presbyter "Iohannes" who was a donator. The duke was assumed to be 11th century Iziaslav I or Vseslav the Grand Prince of Kiev, a late 8th century duke Višeslav/Vojislav of Serbia (c. 780), a late 9th century duke Višeslav (c. 870–900) who was father of Michael of Zahumlje (floruit c. 910–935), or unknown duke of Croatia. The identification of presbyter Iohannes was found to be more detrimental to the dating of the font and identification of the Slavic duke, as the presbyter was identified with the priest Iohannes mentioned in papal letter dated to 879 to the Croatian duke Branimir (879–892), and Annales Fuldenses mentioning him as Iohannes presbiter de Venetiis acting in 874 as a peace treaty co-agent in Forchheim between duke Svatopluk I of Moravia and Louis the German, which would date the font to the second-half of the 9th century.

If Višeslav was a Croatian duke, then the font would be related to the foundation of the Diocese of Nin in the mid-9th century during the period of duke Domagoj (864–876) and Branimir (879–892). Also, Ante Uglešić argued that Višeslav was one of Domagoj's unnamed sons mentioned by John the Deacon who ruled between Domagoj and Zdeslav (876–878).

=== Original location ===
The context of time and space of Slavic and Latin cultural, religious and historical worlds, and amount of stone monuments with Latin epigraphy, points only to the Eastern Adriatic Slavs (from Southern Pannonia to Croatia up to Boka Kotorska in coastal Montenegro), and specifically Croatian cultural area.

It is usually connected to the late 18th century report by Anonim Filippi, describing the 1746 demolition of the baptistery of the Cathedral of Nin, noted were still visible in situ, as well as from the archaeological excavations in 1910 it is known that the baptistery had a four-leaf floor plan and a dome. In the middle of the baptistery was the baptismal font, to which one had to descend five steps (around 90 cm (35 in)) and was decorated with inscriptions and coats of arms. After the baptistery was demolished, the baptismal font was removed in order to expand the cathedral's sacristy. Additional support to it would be reliable descriptions of the apostolic visitors in 1499, by A. Valieri in 1579, M. Priuli in 1603, and F. de Grassis in 1670 mentioning a large stone baptismal vessel/font (magnum lapideum coopertum, baptisterium in quadam capella a parte sinistra altaris maioris quod reperit indecens in modum cisterne, fons baptismalis in Sacristia cathedralis) in the Cathedral of Nin. However, the Anonim Filippi's report itself was written many years after the demolition, the description doesn't correspond completely to the font (but the mentioned stemma could be a reference to column capitals with volutes which are stemma-like), and archaeological excavations gave indeterminate results, but new 2014 archaeological excavation indicate that the original location was in the baptistery of Church of St. Asel in the city of Nin, which was presumably used until early 16th century, when was moved to the Chapel of St. Ambroz which would be described by later reports. The fact that the Cathedral of Nin was under fire several times during its history, and on the font were found traces of dark fatty deposits that form under the long influence of fire smoke, because of their cleaning the edge walls are polished, it is seen as evidence of its location. Scholars suppose that the font's stonecarvers workshop was of local origin, possibly of Benedictine order which made several monuments during the time of duke Branimir.

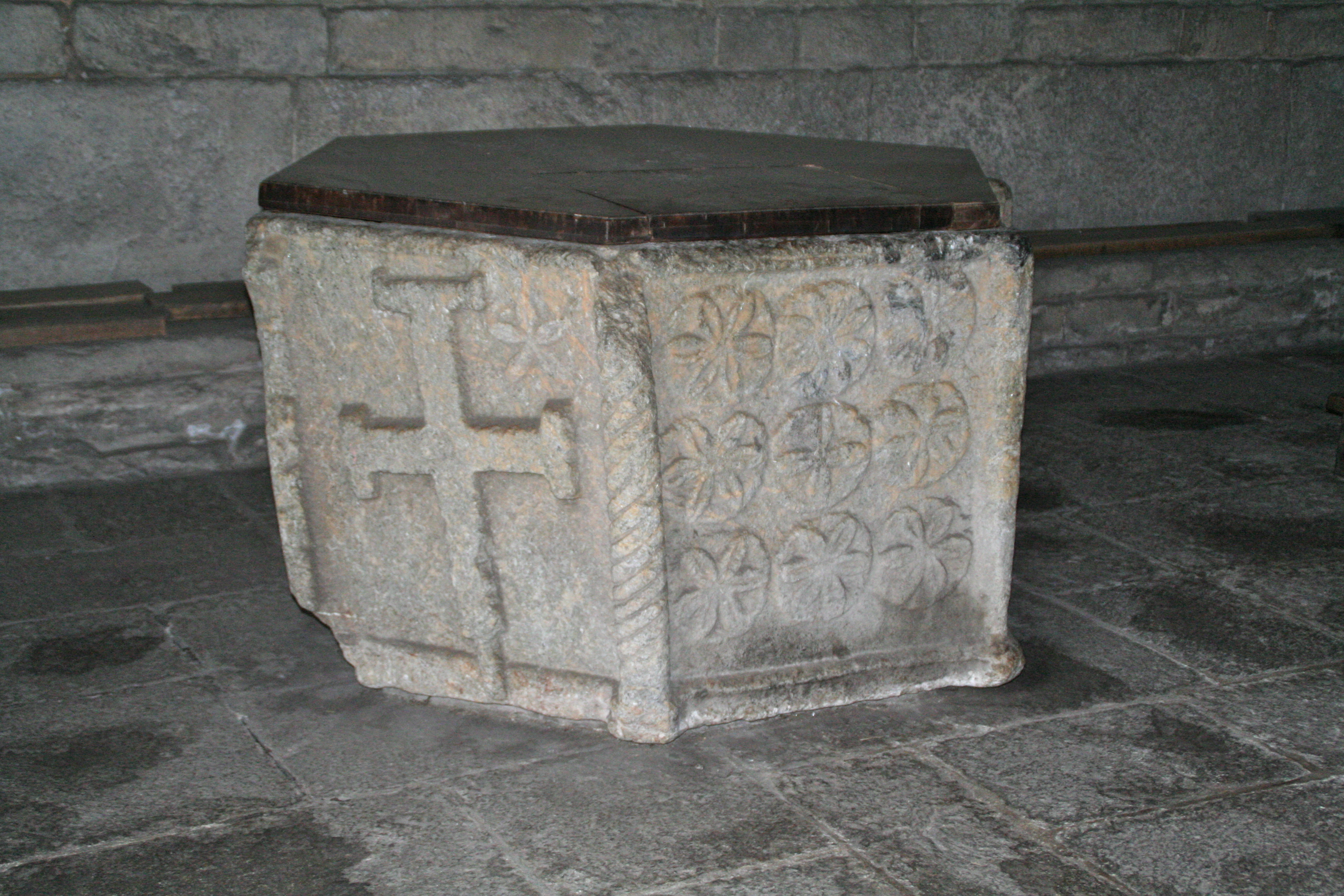
Baptismal font at church of St. Nicolao in Giornico, canton Ticino, Switzerland.

Some scholars like Nikola Jakšić reject the localization in Nin, workshop origin and as being part of the Croatian monument corpus, rather arguing a Venetian origin by mainly using historical arguments. According to the writing of Friuli erudite Federico Altan published in 1749, the six side baptismal font was partially built into the wall of the Capuchin monastery of Il Redentore in Venice, however that does not prove its location before 1746-1749 and that was not before that in Nin, but does not disapprove it either. Jakšić's poorly substantiated assumptions, also noted similarity between this and other baptismal fonts from wider Venetian area, best case being the baptismal font at church of St. Nicolao in Giornico, canton Ticino, Switzerland, but himself and others generally reject any further significance because such fonts were common in Europe.

Jakšić's negation of the Croatian origin inspired the subject to become of interest for the first time in Serbian historiography. In a 2022 article, Serbian historian Predrag Komatina related its stonecarvers workshop to John the bishop of Kotor and the rule of Serbian duke Višeslav/Vojislav from the late 8th century. In 2023, Croatian historian Mirjana Matijević-Sokol characterized Komatina's paper as ostensibly serious, but based on the preponderance of available indications concluded it's more likely that the font came from area of Nin, Croatia.

== Literature ==
- Der Taufstein des kroatischen Fürsten Višeslav aus dem Frühen Mittelalter (in German). Selbstverlag des Deutschen Instituts für merowingisch-karolingische Kunstforschung in Erlangen. 1959.
- Namentragende Steininschriften in Jugoslawien vom Ende des 7. bis zur Mitte des 13. Jahrhunderts. Glossar zur frühmittelalterlichen Geschichte im östlichen Europa: Beihefte (in German). Franz Steiner Verlag. 1982. ISBN 978-3-515-03873-7.
