= Branimir, Duke of Croatia =

Duke of Croatia from 879 to 892

Branimir
- Dux Croatorum & Dux Sclavorum (Princeps, Comes, Dux, Dominus)
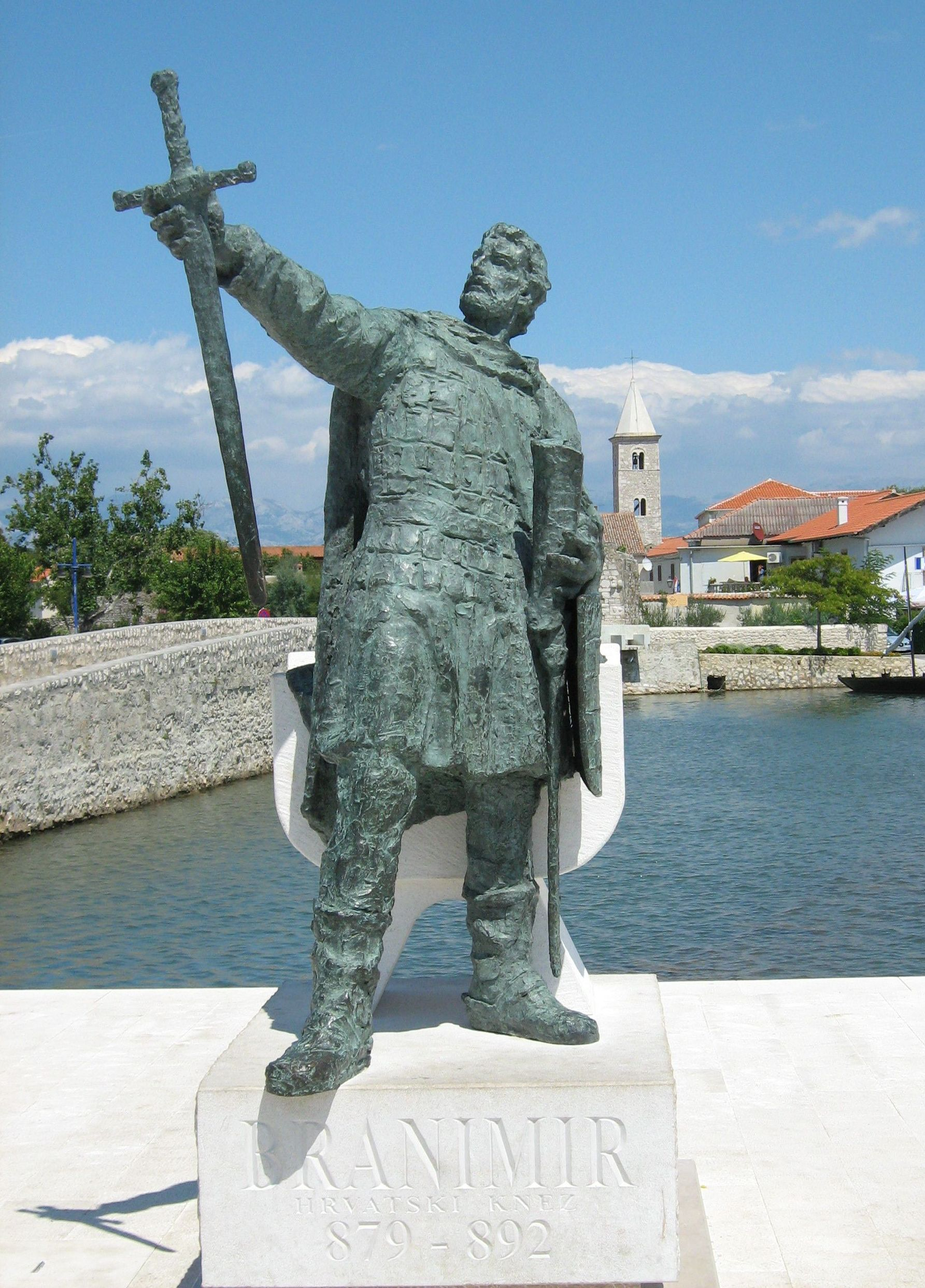
- The monument of Duke Branimir in Nin, Croatia work of prof Josip Poljan

Duke of Croatia
- Reign: 879 – c. 892
- Predecessor: Zdeslav
- Successor: Muncimir
- Burial: Possibly at Crkvina
- Spouse: Mariosa (Maruša)
- Dynasty: Domagojević (?)
- Religion: Christianity

Branimir (Latin: Branimirus) was Duke of Croatia, reigning from 879 to c. 892. His country received papal recognition as a state from Pope John VIII on 7 June 879. During his reign, Duchy of Croatia retained its sovereignty from both Carolingian and Byzantine rule and became de jure independent. His rule marks the first real peak of early medieval Croatia. It was characterized by establishing closer relations with the Holy See, ecclestical re-organization in the former Roman province of Dalmatia, Christianization, and (re)construction of churches. Branimir is mentioned, for the period, in many reliable primary and secondary written and epigraphic sources.

== Reign ==
=== Rise to power ===
In 879, a "certain Slav of the name Branimir" reportedly had the weak Duke Zdeslav, a supporter of the Byzantine Empire, killed near Knin in a rebellion that he led, per John the Deacon's Chronicon Venetum et Gradense (early 11th century).

Five papal letters sent between 879 and 882 are preserved in the Epistolae Ioannis VIII. During the solemn divine service in St. Peter's church in Rome in 879, Pope John VIII gave his blessing to the duke, the duke's authority and the whole Croatian people and country, about which he informed Branimir in the first letter. The Pope brought this decision on 21 May 879, and confirmed it in his letter on 7 June 879 (mentioning him as Dilecto filio Branimir). As the blessing was reported by the Pope himself twenty days later, it may have had a significant meaning for the time, recognizing Croatia as a relevant part of medieval Christian Europe as well as a sovereign state. In the third letter of the same month, Branimir is once again mentioned (as principis ... Branimir), and the letter is titled to all honorable priests and all the people (Omnibus uenerauilibus/sacerdotibus et uniuerso populo).

After 880, Branimir did not succumb to the pressure of the Carolingian Emperor Charles the Fat to recognize his sovereignty, even after the emperor entered into an alliance with the Republic of Venice against Croatia. In Branimir's time, Venetians had to pay taxes to Croatia and to the Narentines for the right to travel by ship along the eastern Adriatic coast, while the Dalmatian cities under Byzantium protection paid 710 ducats of tribute to the Croatian ruler.

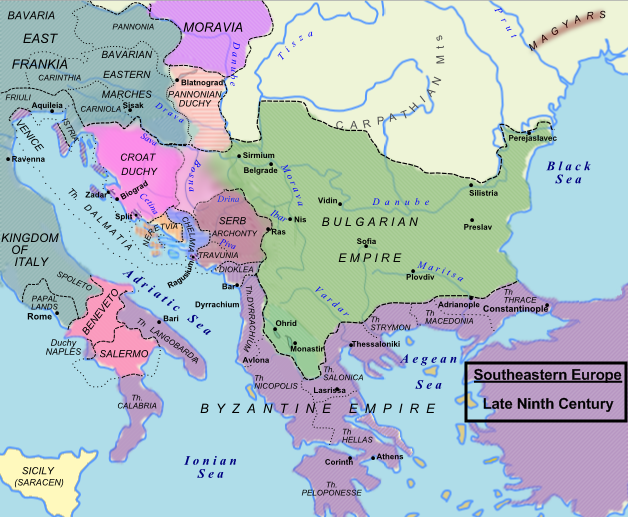
Duchy of Croatia in late 9th century.

Throughout his reign, Duke Branimir worked on increasing the duchy's independence. According to the map of his contemporary, Anglo-Saxon king Alfred the Great (871–899), the territory of "Dalmatia" was between the Adriatic Sea, Danube, "desolate lands", Bulgars and Achaia. Branimir reigned until around 892. He was succeeded by Trpimir I's third son, Muncimir.

=== Religious policy ===
At the time pope's commitment with Branimir is obvious intention to connect Croatian Church with the Holy See and Diocese of Rome, but also affirm old organization in the province of Dalmatia in which ancient Salona (then Split) was the metropolitan centre of Dalmatia. In 880-882, Duke Branimir via Theodosius, the bishop of the Diocese of Nona (episcopus Croatorum) which was formed on initiation of Patriarchate of Aquileia, wrote to Pope John VIII affirming commitment to the Roman Papacy, and recognized the supreme ecclesiastical authority of the bishop of Rome.

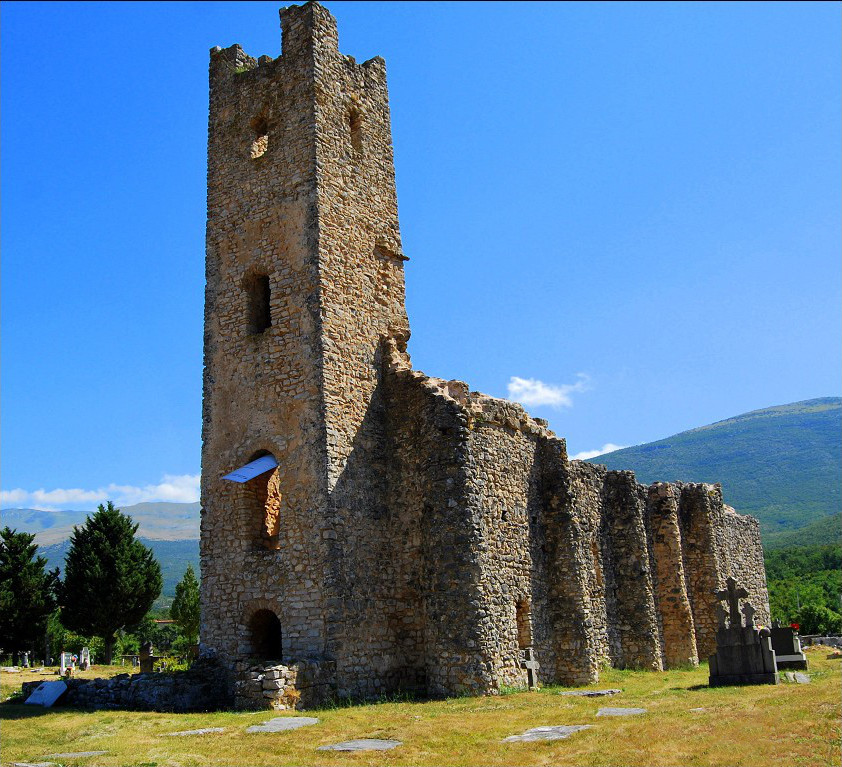
Church of Holy Salvation, on the Cetina river source, built in the time of Branimir.

However, the situation complicated until 887 during the time of pope Stephen V (information is found in few letters and preserved in Decretum Ivonis and Decretum Gratiani Collectio Britannica). The previous archbishop of Split, Marin, died and Theodosius was promoted to the position by Aquileian patriarch Walpert in 886, but did not abolish Diocese in Nin as wanted by the Holy See, however, eventually in 887–888 was confirmed as the archbishop of Split (with a pallium). Later after his death, Diocese of Nona once again will be temporary separated from the Archdiocese of Split.

Under the influence of Methodius' baptising missions in 882 who made a stop in Croatia on his way from Moravia to Constantinople, Branimir possibly also endorsed parallel usage of Latin and Slavic in liturgy.

In 18th century Mensa episcopalis - Donationales from the archive of Archdiocese of Split is preserved a copy of the Hungarian-Croatian king Gejza charter (dated 1158, but probably a 13-14th century falsificate) in which are confirmed donation of village Srinjine in Mosor to Archdiocese of Split by "Branimir dux Chroatorum" (original probably was dated between 879–886). The information is also related to Thomas the Archdeacon's Historia Salonitana (13th century) account about archbishop Marin and Branimir duke of "Sclavonia".

He also undertook a pilgrimage to Cividale. His name is found in the Evangelistary of Cividale together with the name of his wife Mariosa (Branimero comiti, Mariosa cometissa; Croatian: Maruša or Marija).

=== Etymology and royal house ===
His name Branimir (with recorded variations Branimiri, Branimiro, Branimerus, Branimirus, Brannimerus, Branimero, Breanimir) is an old Slavic name, and could be translated as "defender of peace", as the verb brani- means to defend while word mir means peace in Slavic languages.

Unlike his predecessor and successor (both Trpimirović), some historians suggest that Branimir might be a member of the House of Domagojević, particularly, one of Domagoj's sons, but there's no certainty.

== Epigraphs and sarcophagus ==
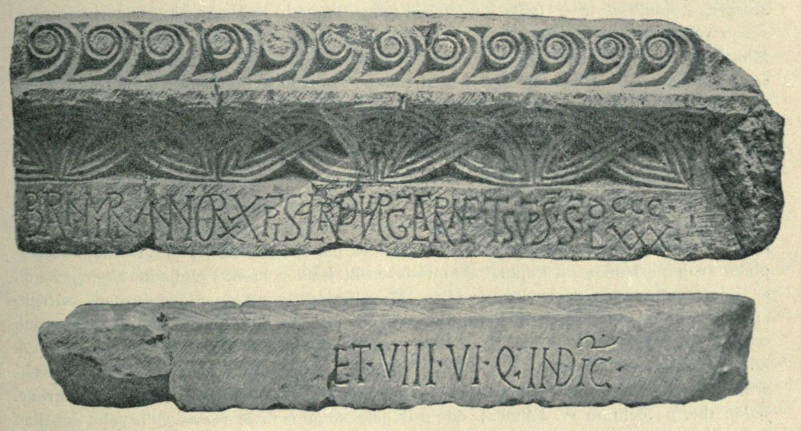
Inscription of duke Branimir from Muć with engraved year 888.

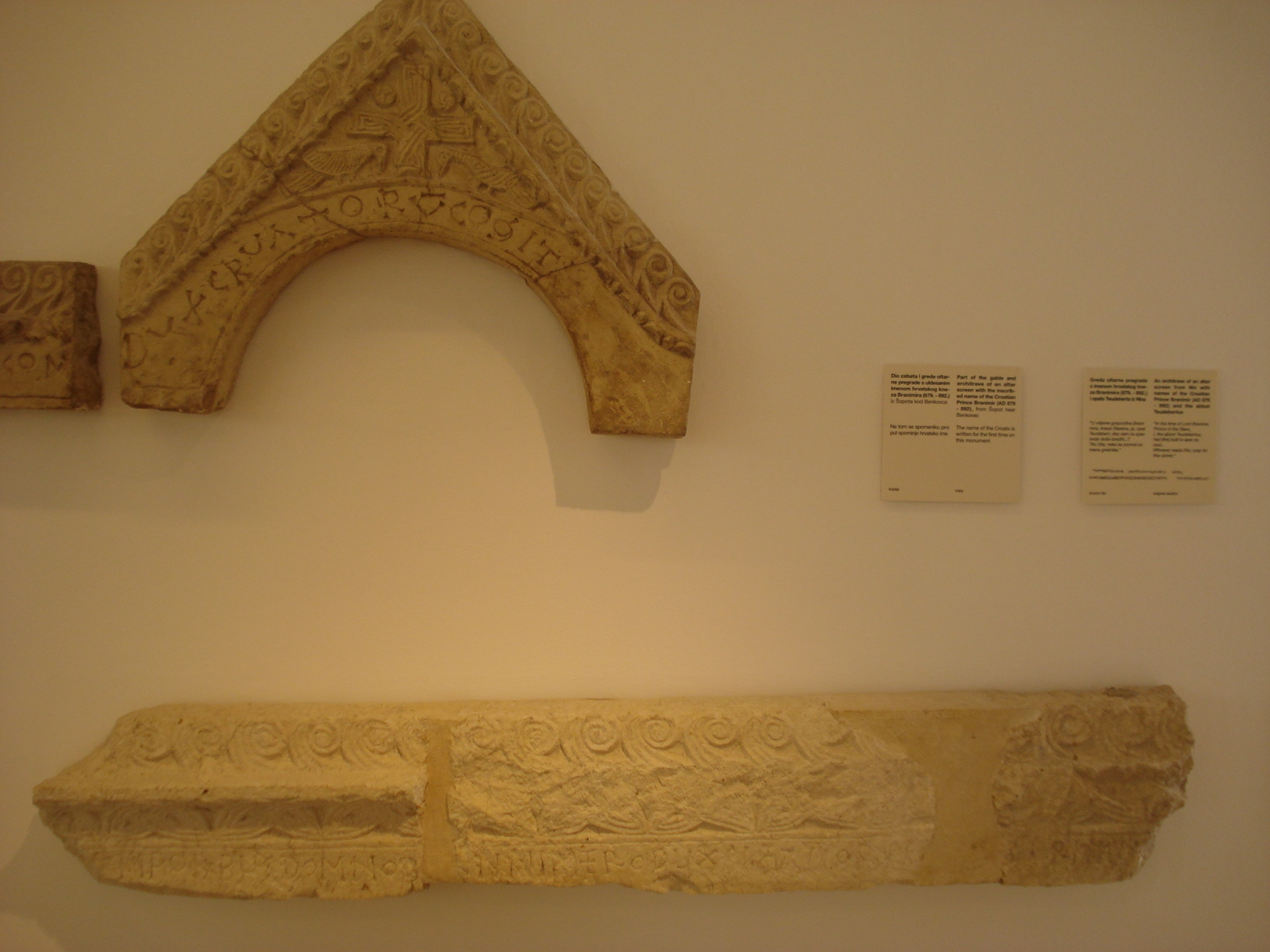
Up: part of the Branimir Inscription from Šopot near Benkovac as "Dux Cruatorum". Down: inscription of duke Branimir from Nin as "Dux Slcavorum".

Today, there are six or eight known epigraphic inscriptions, mostly altar beams from old Croatian churches (from Muć, Nin, Ždrapanj, Šopot, Otres once located between Bribir and Ostrovica, and Lepuri near Benkovac), that bear the name of Duke Branimir. Recently were confirmed seventh from Bribir and eighth from Lepuri. In them Branimir is titled as "Dux Croatorum", "Commes Dux Cruatorum/Crvatorum", "Dux/Ducem Slcavorum/Clavitorum", and Dominus. The one from Muć has the earliest carved year (888) of any Croatian medieval epigraphic inscription. The one from Šopot has the earliest carved ethnonym Hrvat (Cruat-/Crvat-) in the form which is still pronounced today, which is also earliest record of a national name in the Balkans. During his rule Croatia must have been financially rich to be able to build so many churches and inscriptions, and influencing the acceleration of the process of ethnogenesis with the wider use of Croatian ethnonyms.

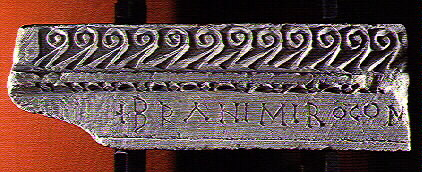
Part of the Branimir Inscription from Šopot near Benkovac.

On 6 March 1891, Lujo Marun found three sarcophagus and two burials in westwork of the ruins of 9th-century basilica of St. Mary located in Crkvine near village Biskupija. In them were an adult man, woman, young adult man and two young boys. They were rich in decorations and artifacts dated to the same period, with the main sarcophagus (possibly forcibly opened already in 12–13th century) having engraved a Latin cross partly forming a crown, including among others bronze gilded spurs, gold coins of Constantine V (741–775) and Leo IV the Khazar (775–780) which usage was common at the time in early medieval Croatia. The man was fully dressed in silk with warrior artifacts and Christian motifs. It is still considered that they belong to a princely family, usually associated with Branimir (or possibly Trpimir) and his wife Mariosa. Only part of findings survived as, reportedly, the next day after discovery a group of people re-opened the sarcophagus and smashed with stones the bones and dress of the adult man, while one pendant was stolen in Belgrade during Marun's travel in 1924. The main sarcophagus and part of artifacts are preserved until today in the Split Archaeological Museum.

== Legacy ==
Currently, Croatia's government presents the Order of Duke Branimir as one of its highest state honours. The date of 21 May is marked today as Croatian Diplomacy Day.

Branimir of Croatia House of Domagojević
Regnal titles
Preceded by Zdeslav	Duke of the Croats; 879 – c. 892	Succeeded by Muncimir
