= Domagojević dynasty =

Domagojević
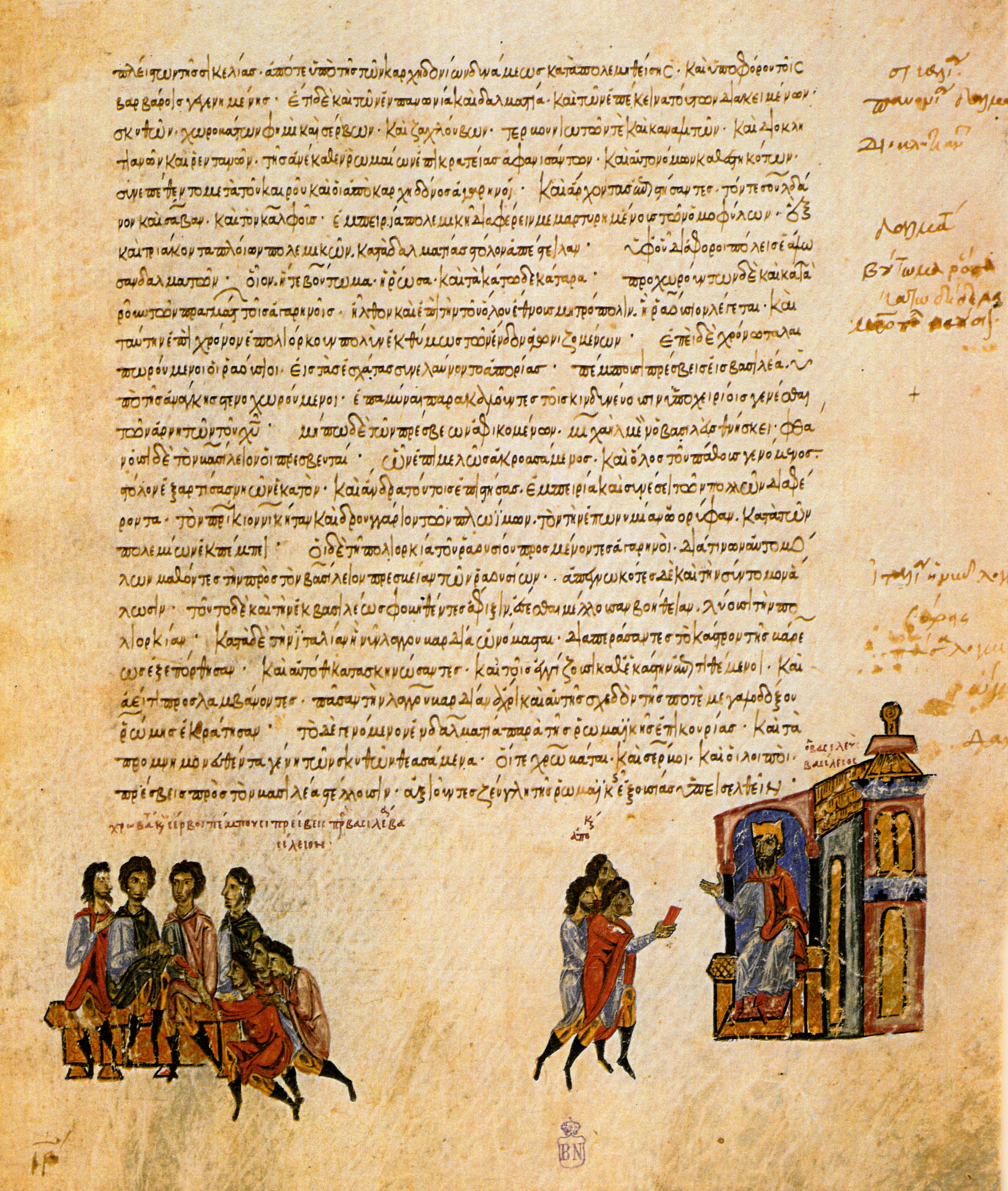
- Delegation of Croats and Serbs to the Byzantine Emperor Basil I at the time of Domagojević rule (Madrid Skylitzes manuscript)
- Country: Duchy of Croatia
- Founded: c. 864
- Founder: Domagoj
- Final ruler: Branimir (?)
- Titles: Duke (knez); Duke of the Croats (knez Hrvata)
- Dissolution: 892

The Domagojević dynasty (Croatian: Domagojevići) was a native Croatian dynasty that ruled in Croatia, probably from 864 until 892, with interruptions. After the Trpimirović dynasty, they are the most well known Croatian dynasty in the Early Middle Ages.

The dynasty was named after Domagoj, the first member of the dynasty known by name. The most famous of the Domagojević dynasty members are Domagoj (founder) and Branimir, but the relation between Domagoj and Branimir is controversial, as some historians think that Branimir was a son of Domagoj, other think they were in some other family relation, or that there was no family relationship between them at all.

== Dukes of Croatia ==
- Domagoj (864–876)
- Unnamed son of Domagoj (876–878)

=== Uncertain ===
- Branimir (879–892)

== See also ==
- List of rulers of Croatia
- Duchy of Croatia
