= Charter of Duke Trpimir =

9th-century Croatian law document

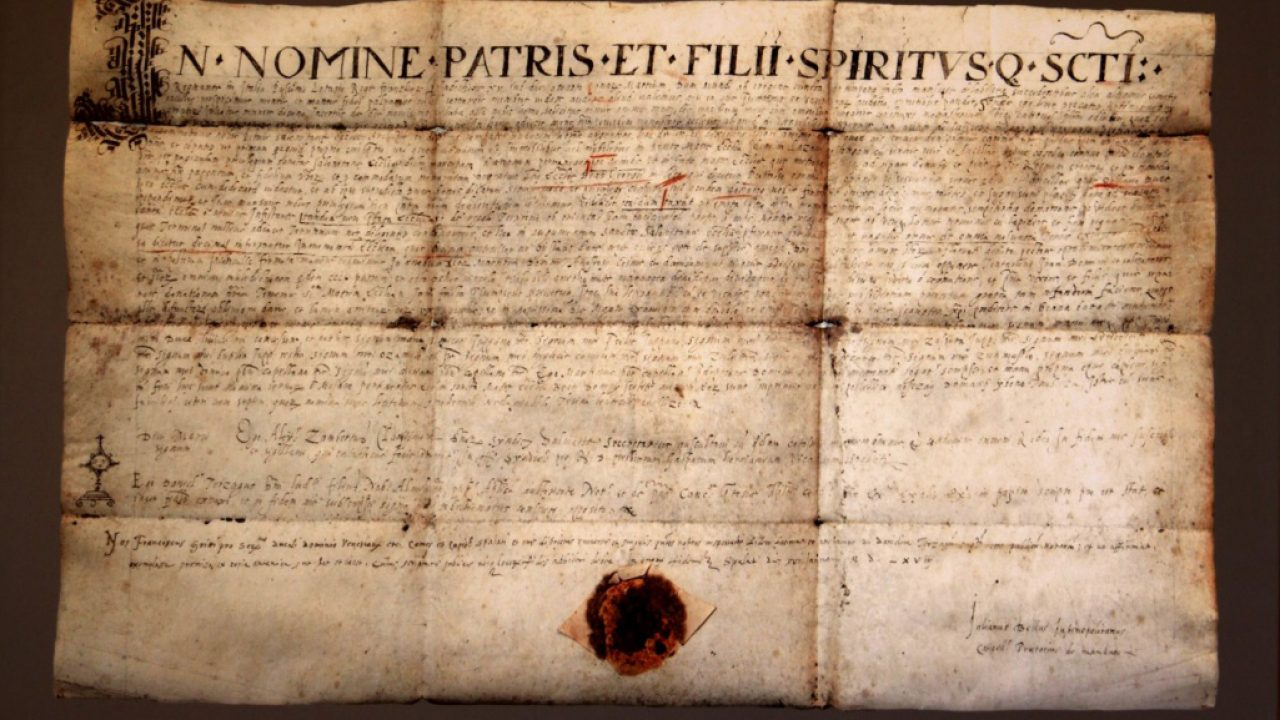
- Photo of copy of Charter of Duke Trpimir
- Created: 4 March 852
- Signatories: Duke Trpimir

The Charter of Duke Trpimir (Croatian: Povelja kneza Trpimira), also known as Trpimir's deed of donation (Croatian: Trpimirova darovnica) is the oldest preserved document of the Croatian law, the oldest from the court of one of the Croatian rulers and the first national document which mentions the Croatian name. Charter, dated to 4 March 852, is not preserved in its original form but in five subsequent transcripts out of which the oldest is from year 1568.

== Dating ==
Dating of the Charter is contained in the following sentence in Latin: Regnante in Italia piissimo Lothario Francorum rege per indictionem XV sub die IIII Nonis Martii (English: During the reign of a very pious Frankish king Lothair I in Italy, indiction 15, March 4).

Historians Daniele Farlati and Ivan Kukuljević Sakcinski considered that the indiction XV refers to the year 837, while Ivan Lučić Lucius considered that indiction refers to the year 838, which cannot be because of indiction. Historian Franjo Rački corrected the opinion of Farlati and Kukuljević Sakcinski because Lothair I reigned as "Francorum rex", King of Franks, only since year 840, and also because, according to chronicler John the Deacon, Duke Mislav reigned over Duchy of Croatia in year 837. Accordingly, indiction XV can only refer to year 852.

Miho Barada gave the first extensive palaeographic-diplomatic analysis to attempt to reconstruct the original text. In addition, valuable contributions were also given by Lovre Katić and Marko Kostrenčić.

In recent years, the debate on the issue was renewed by Lujo Margetić who thought that, because Lothari had already left Italy in year 840 and succeeded his father to the imperial throne, it is very unlikely that Trpimir was unaware of that change on the imperial throne even twelve years later. According to Margetić, the real date when the document was written would be March 4, 840. This Margetić's claim is supported by writings of John the Deacon according to which Justin was Archbishop of Split in year 840 after Archbishop Petar which is mentioned in the Charter.

== Content ==
Although the Charter is preserved in fragments it can be seen that the ruler (Dux Chroatorum) had almost unlimited power in the country, because Trpimir called himself "the ruler of the Croats by the grace of God". Charter proves the existence of Croats before Trpimir, because it confirms deed of donation given to the Archdiocese of Split by Trpimir's predecessor Mislav. In addition, Trpimir gave Church of St. George in Putalj and some other estates with associated serfs to the Archdiocese of Split. Charther shows that Croatia was a feudal state in formation and that the Croatian ruler had his state government which was made out of his courtiers and military and administrative officials, such as prefects and court chaplains. Trpimir also established the right of the Catholic Church to collect tithe. Feudal nature of the ruler's authority is confirmed by the fact that Trpimir had national territory and his own feudal domains. Although Trpimir acted as a real ruler, he was not formally independent, but was rather a vassal of the Successor of Frankish ruler in Italy, Lombardy king Lothair. On the basis of this Charter, it can be concluded that the Croatian state finally emerged in the third decade of the 9th century.

== Authenticity ==
The question of authenticity of the Charter has emerged from the beginning of its historiographical research. Doubts about the authenticity stemmed from problems with the dating, misunderstanding of certain language terms, and also from the fact that the copies of the Charter passed through many hands and that the Charter itself is vague and contradictory in many parts because of that. Some of the evidences that the Charter is authentic are for example terms mancipatio and mancipare. According to Lujo Margetić, these terms indicate the ancient Roman forms of acquiring property and were at the time slowly disappearing as knowledge of Corpus Juris Civilis was growing by the activity of glossators, but they also linger at least in Italy even in the 9th century AD. Trpimir's and Muncimir's documents are evidence that those terms were known in Croatia. Olga Perić also came to the similar results noting that at least two old and different language layers can be found in the text of the Charter. Držislav Švob considered this Charter to be forgery from 14th century because of its "unconvincing arguments and arbitrary assumptions".

Some interesting observations in support of Charter authenticity were presented by Neven Budak. First observation refers to the name of people from the Trpimir's escort that are mentioned in the eschatocol of the Charter, which points out that all the names are national, Croatian names, and not Christian, unless of course those from the priests. This is understandable because it was a time when only traditional names were prevailing among newly baptized nations. Budak disputes the contention that the institution of chaplain as a court scribe did not exist in the 9th century, stating that it is known in Bavaria in the 8th century and that it was accepted by Carolingian dynasty.
