= Trpimir I =

9th-century Duke of Croatia

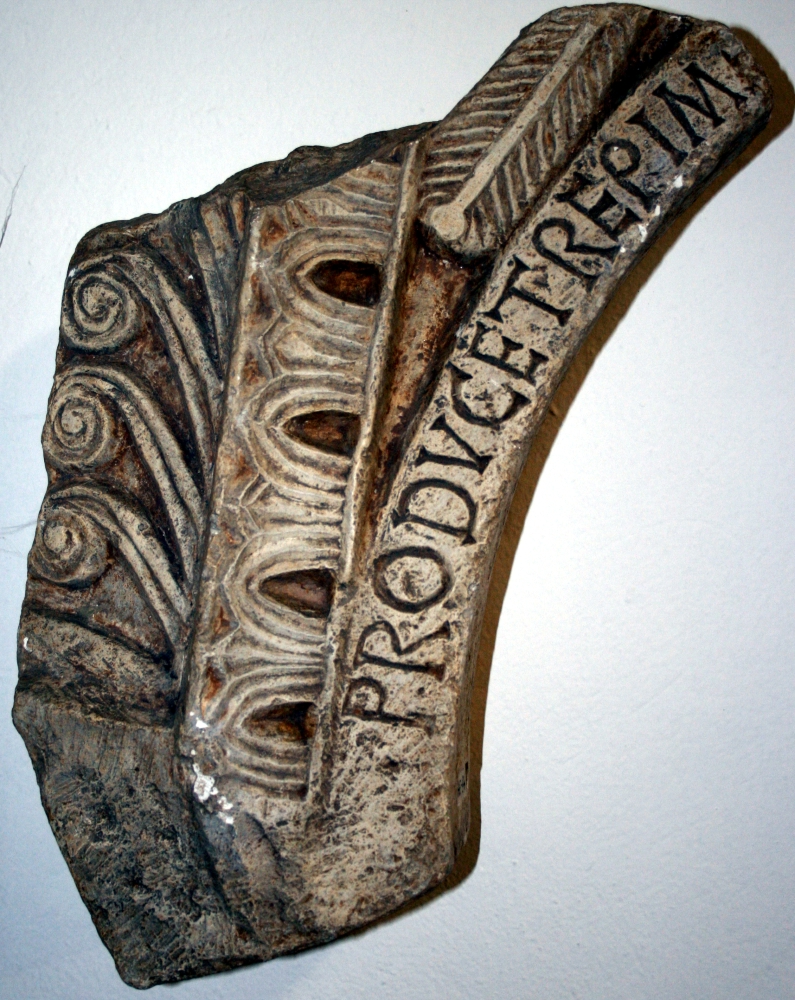
- Pro Duce Trepimero

Duke of Croatia
- Reign: c. 845–864
- Predecessor: Mislav
- Successor: Domagoj
- Died: c. 864
- Issue: Zdeslav; Peter; Muncimir
- Dynasty: Trpimirović
- Religion: Christianity

Trpimir I (Croatian pronunciation: [tř̩pimiːr př̩ʋiː], Latin: Trepimerus/Trepimero) was a duke (Croatian: knez) in Croatia from around 845 until his death in 864. He is considered the founder of the Trpimirović dynasty that ruled in Croatia, with interruptions, from around 845 until 1091. Although he was formally vassal of the Frankish Emperor Lothair I, Trpimir used Frankish-Byzantine conflicts to rule on his own.

== Reign ==
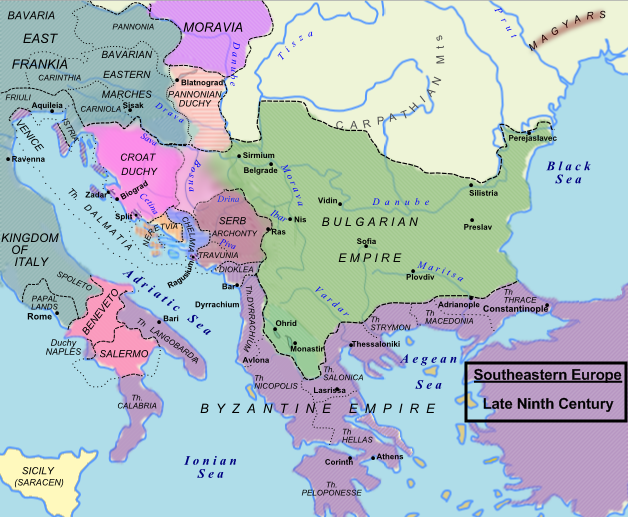
Duchy of Croatia around 850

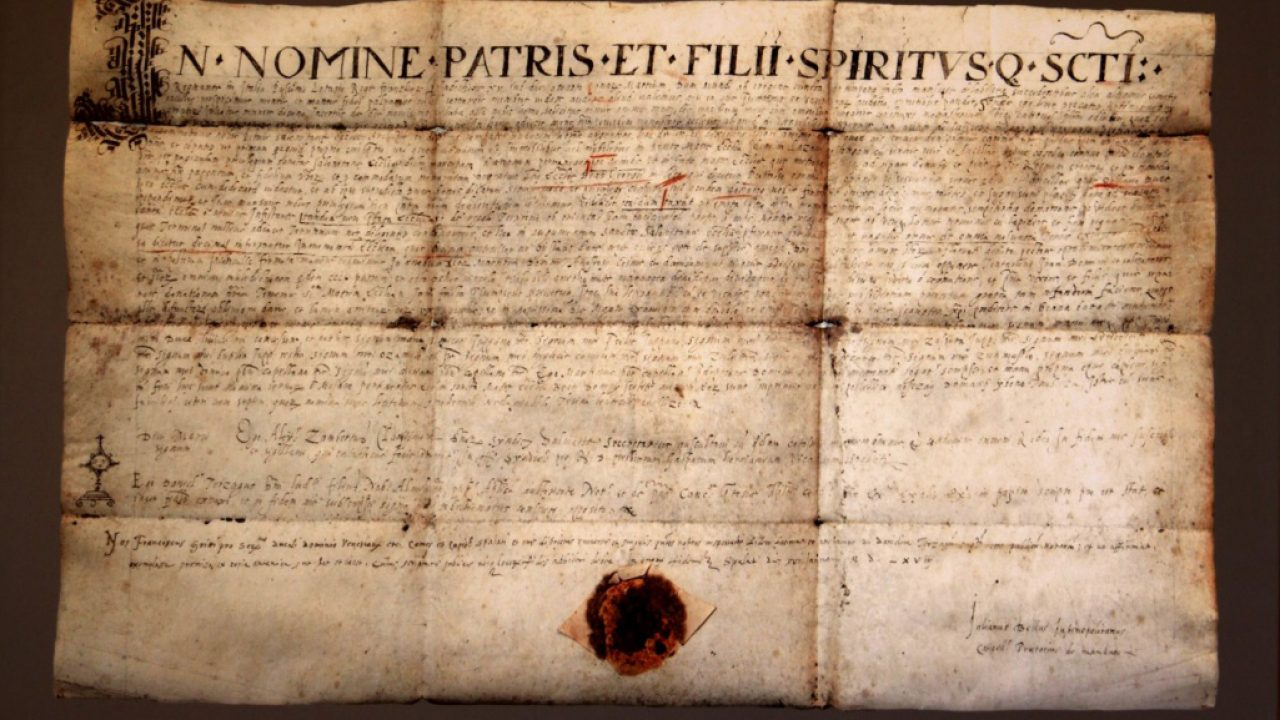
Latin Charter of Duke Trpimir, dated to the year 852

Trpimir succeeded Croatia's Duke Mislav around 845, ascended the throne in Klis and expanded the early Roman stronghold into Klis Fortress, the capital of his domain. Trpimir battled successfully against his neighbours, the Byzantine coastal cities under the strategos of Zadar in 846. In 854, he repulsed an attack by an army of the Bulgarian Khan Boris I and concluded a peace treaty with him, exchanging gifts. The Bulgarians and Croatians coexisted peacefully after that time.

On 4 March 852 Trpimir issued a charter in Biaći (in loco Byaci dicitur) in the Latin language, confirming Mislav's donations to the Archbishopric in Split. The charter is preserved in a copy from 1568. Analyses of the copy indicate it's not certain if the original was indeed older than the Branimir inscription. In this document, Trpimir named himself "by the mercy of God, Duke of the Croats" (Dux Chroatorum iuvatus munere divino) and his realm as the "Realm of the Croats" (Regnum Chroatorum), which is one of the first known usage of the name of Croats. The term regnum was used by other rulers of that time as a sign of their independence and did not necessarily mean a kingdom. The charter documents his ownership of Klis Fortress and mentions Trpimir's decision to build a church and the first Benedictine monastery in Rižinice, between the towns of Klis and Solin, thus bringing the Benedictins into Croatia. On a gable arch from an altar screen of the Rižinice monastery, carved in stone, stands a text with the duke's name and title:

PRO DVCE TREPIME[RO... ...PRECE]S CHR[IST]O SV[B]MIT[TATIS ET INCLINATA HABE]TE COLA TERME[NTES...]

He also likely built a church in Kapitul, in the vicinity of Knin castle, where his name is recorded from archaeological remains.

Trpimir undertook a pilgrimage to Cividale together with his son Peter, which was recorded in the Evangelistary of Cividale, where he is titled as dominus (domno).

The Saxon theologian Gottschalk of Orbais was at Trpimir's court between 846 and 848, after leaving Venice and before moving to Bulgaria, and his work De Trina deitate is an important source for Trpimir's reign. He describes Trpimir's accomplishments and his victory over a Byzantine patricius in 846, which Gottschalk connected with his theory of predestination. Trpimir was a proclaimed rex Sclavorum as a token of admiration from Gottschalk, which is also a sign of his independent rule.

=== Descendants ===
The end of Trpimir's reign remains vaguely distinctive, just like the sequence of his successors. He had three sons: Peter, Zdeslav and probably Muncimir, since in a charter dated to 892, in the time of Duke Muncimir's rule, Muncimir stated that "he returned to his fathers throne," which was usurped by Branimir. Trpimir was succeeded in around 864 either by his son Zdeslav, who was shortly after deposed by Domagoj, or directly by Domagoj who forced Trpimir's sons to flee to Constantinople.

== See also ==
- Croatian–Bulgarian wars
- Trpimirović dynasty

Trpimir I of Croatia House of Trpimirović Died: c. 864
Regnal titles
Preceded by Mislav	Duke of the Croats c. 845 – 864	Succeeded by Domagoj
