= Branimir inscription =

9th-century Croatian inscription

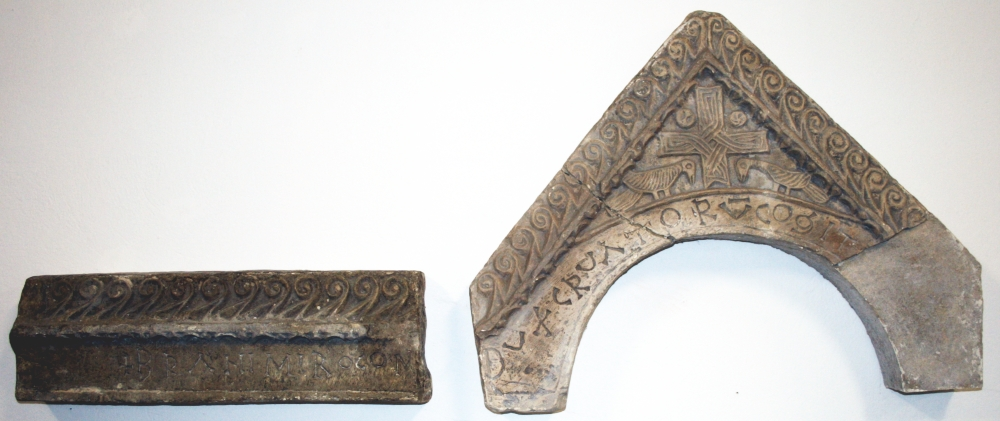
- Created: 879-892
- Location: Šopot, near Benkovac, Croatia
- Purpose: Templon beam and gable inscription

The Branimir inscription (Croatian: Natpis kneza Branimira) is the oldest preserved monument containing an inscription defining a Croatian medieval ruler as a duke of Croats – Dux Cruatorum. The inscription was originally part of a templon of a church in Šopot at Benkovac built by Duke Branimir, who ruled Croatia from 879–892.

== Description ==
The inscribed beam and gable fragments contain a Latin language reference to Branimir as BRANIMIRO COM[ES]… DVX CRVATORṼ COGIT[AVIT]… ("the count Branimir… considered duke of the Croats…"). The first two words are inscribed on the 67 by 21 cm (26.4 by 8.3 in) beam fragment, and the rest on the 74 to 81 cm (29 to 32 in) wide and 65 cm (26 in) tall gable fragment. Both of the fragments have matching ornamentation along the top edge, with a cross executed in Croatian interlace on the gable and a pair of birds, one to either side of the cross. The fragments were originally parts of a templon in a church completed in the 9th century and consecrated to Saint Jerome. The church was built by Branimir, who reigned in 879–892. The inscription is kept in Museum of Croatian Archaeological Monuments in Split.

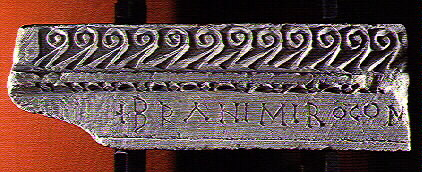
The Branimir Inscription, beam

The inscription is significant for the history of Croatia as it represents one of the oldest surviving references to a Croatian ruler, but also the earliest fully recorded use of the particular name for Croats. There are seven other preserved stone inscriptions mentioning Branimir, found in Nin, Ždrapanj near Skradin, Otres near Bribir, in Muć Gornji near Split, Lepuri near Benkovac among others. The one found in Muć contains the consecration year, dating the inscription to year 888.

The oldest epigraphic inscription of a Croatian ruler are most probably those of Mislav of Croatia. A possibly older references to a Croatian ethnonym have been confirmed in a church inscription found in Bijaći near Trogir dated to the end of the 8th or early 9th century; and a charter of duke Trpimir I of Croatia from the year 852, however, its original is lost, and analyses of its 1568 copy indicate it might not indeed be older than the Branimir inscription.
