= Domagoj, Duke of Croatia =

Duke of Croatia

Domagoj

Duke of Croatia
- Reign: c. 864–876
- Predecessor: Trpimir I
- Successor: Unnamed son, soon Zdeslav
- Died: c. 876
- Issue: Unnamed son
- Dynasty: Domagojević
- Religion: Christianity

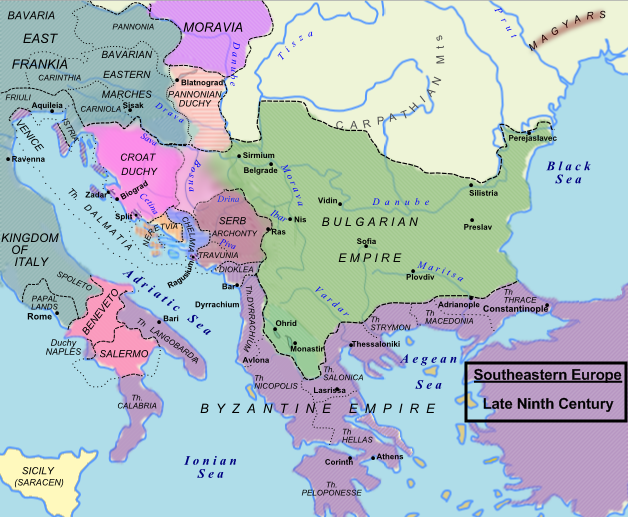
Duchy of Croatia (top left) during Domagoj's reign

Domagoj (Latin: Domagoi) was Duke of Croatia from 864 to 876, and the founder of the Domagojević dynasty. He usurped the Croatian throne after the death of Trpimir I and expelled his sons. He took a more active role in the Adriatic Sea than his predecessors, encouraged the use of force and waged many wars, specifically with the Arabs, Venice and the East Francia. Domagoj's belligerence and the tolerance and support of piracy caused bad relations with Pope John VIII, which was further worsened after Domagoj showed no mercy to his conspirators. Formally a Frankish vassal, he used to his advantage the Frankish succession crisis and started a successful revolt against Carloman of Bavaria. After his death in 876, Domagoj was succeeded by his son who was deposed and expelled by Zdeslav in 878.

== Reign ==
=== Wars with the Venetians and Arabs ===
When Duke Trpimir I died in 864, he was succeeded by his son Zdeslav. Domagoj, then a Knin nobleman, overthrew him in the same year. Zdeslav fled to Constantinople.

Venetian ships were often attacked in the eastern Adriatic, which caused bad relations with Venice. At the time of Domagoj's succession, Venice, under Doge Pietro Tradonico, began taking a more active role in the Adriatic Sea, and gained more independence from the Byzantine Empire. Pietro Tradonico was killed in 864, and was succeeded by Orso I Participazio. As soon as he came to power, the new Doge of Venice broke the long lasting peace treaty signed with Duke Mislav and attacked Croatia, which was still occupied with fighting over Trpimir's inheritance. In 865, Domagoj was forced to make an unfavourable peace with Venice, giving hostages as a guarantee for safe passage of Venetian ships in the Adriatic.

In 866, the Arabs were attacking the Dalmatian coast. The Arabs also held several cities on the Italian coast, including Bari and Taranto. After ravaging Kotor, Kišan, and Budva, the Arabs started besieging Dubrovnik, which resisted the attacks for 15 months and was finally defended by the help of Byzantium. The Byzantines regained initiative in the Adriatic and attacked Bari in 868, together with the Franks, but soon recalled their forces while blaming Franks for inactivity. Domagoj helped the Franks, as their vassal, to seize Bari from the Emirate of Bari in February 871. Ships from Dubrovnik also participated in the attack. Although the Arabs were still dangerous with their raids in the Adriatic, the Venetians were the main enemy of Domagoj. In the meantime, Byzantium restored control over several Dalmatian cities and the Narentines, while the Venetians renewed their attacks on Croats. An attempt to overthrow Domagoj, possibly from the Trpimirović dynasty and with Byzantine help, forced Domagoj to a temporary peace in order to deal with the rebels. Domagoj dealt with them quickly and cruelly. The conspirator that revealed him the plot was also killed, since he hoped that it would save his life.

=== Relations with the Papal States ===
In terms of relations with the Pope, Domagoj acted differently from his predecessor Trpimir. There is no information that Domagoj built a church or donated property to a local diocese. Unlike Trpimir, Branimir and his wife Maruša, Pannonian Duke Braslav, and Trpimir's sons Petar and Zdeslav, Domagoj did not conduct a pilgrimage to Cividale and was not registered in the Evangelistary of Cividale. Domagoj made no attempts to continue the spreading of the Gospel or to support the Church in such efforts. This period of cold relations forced the Pope to show more interest into Croatia, but also in other countries where his influence was fading. Thus in the second half of the 9th century Roman interventions became more intense in Moravia, Bulgaria and Dalmatia. The strategies of the Apostolic See were to maximize its influence in Southeastern Europe and to lower the influence of Constantinople.

In a letter addressed to Domagoj between December 872 and May 873, Pope John VIII complained to Domagoj about the obstinacy of Patriarch Ignatius from Constantinople, who had denied Roman jurisdiction over Bulgaria and appointed a "schismatic" as the Archbishop of Bulgaria. The reason for the Pope's sharing such concerns with Domagoj is that Bulgaria apparently bordered Croatia in some part of present-day Bosnia. At the same time the Pope had regular conversation with Boris I of Bulgaria, warning him of a treachery of the Byzantine priests and bishops working in Bulgaria. The papal project could have been to incorporate Croatian Christianity into the Bulgarian Church under the jurisdiction of Rome, thus encouraging the pro-Roman politics of Boris I of Bulgaria who then ruled much of the Balkans. Another letter was sent in 874 or at the beginning of 875, this time to the Croatian clergy, in which the Pope condemned the capital punishment inflicted on the conspirators who were under the protection of Pope's legate, priest John. The Pope also stated that the priest had nothing to do with the conspirators so he could continue his duties normally.

Piracy was also a big concern for the Pope. Domagoj was accused of attacking a ship which was bringing home the papal legates who had participated in the Eighth Catholic Ecumenical Council. In 874, Pope John VIII intervened by requesting Duke Domagoj as a Christian to restrain the pirates who were in his name ravaging the Adriatic assaulting Christian sailors and that exile would be a more suitable punishment for the rebels instead of death penalties, but his request wasn't successful. Pope John VIII referred to Domagoj in letters as "Duke Domagoj the Famous" (Latin: Domagoi duci glorioso), but also wrote that he won't find Domagoj innocent if piracy was not dealt with.

=== Conflict with the Franks and decline ===
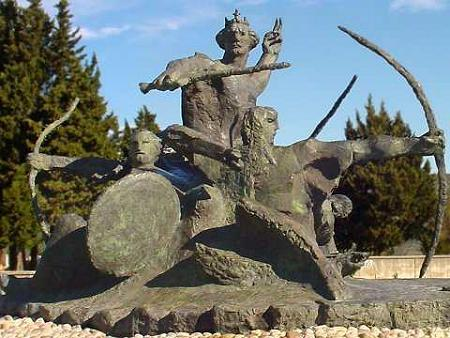
The monument Archers of Duke Domagoj in Vid, Croatia by Stjepan Skoko (1997).

In 875 the Franks under the leadership of Louis the German, King of the Eastern Franks, tried to reassert their authority in Dalmatia, worried by the increased Byzantine influence in the area, reflected in the establishment of Theme of Dalmatia. After the death of Louis the German, Carloman of Bavaria succeeded to the throne and Duke Domagoj decided to raise a rebellion and free Croatia from Frankish rule. The Croatian forces razed four Frankish Cities in Istria in 876, Umag, Novigrad, Sipar and Rovinj. These actions also disrupted the temporary peace treaty with the Venetians and Domagoj's navy attacked Venetian ships in the Gulf of Piran. The Croatian army intended to attack the town of Grado, but was defeated by the Venetian navy. This war liberated the Croats from supreme Frankish rule with Byzantine help from the Byzantine Emperor Basil I. Soon after eliminating the Frankish suzerainty, Domagoj died in 876. After Domagoj's death, Venetian's chronicles named him "The worst duke of Slavs" (Latin: Sclavorum pessimo duce). He was succeeded by his son, whose name is not known. In older historiography it was assumed that his name was Iljko. Two years later, in 878, Zdeslav returned from Constantinople where he fled from Domagoj's purges and, with Byzantine help, deposed Domagoj's sons and forced them into exile, thus restoring the Trpimirović dynasty on the Croatian throne. Zdeslav acknowledged the rule of Byzantine Emperor Basil I. After Zdeslav came to power, peace was restored between Croatia and Venice; however, he was soon killed and usurped by Branimir, who received papal recognition as the monarch of sovereign Croatia in 879.

== See also ==
- Order of Duke Domagoj
- History of Croatia

== Footnotes ==
Domagoj, Duke of Croatia House of Domagojević Died: 876
Regnal titles
Preceded by Trpimir I	Duke of Croatia; 864–876	Succeeded by Domagoj's unnamed son then Zdeslav (878)
