= Muncimir =

Duke of Croatia
- Reign: c. 892–910
- Predecessor: Branimir
- Successor: Tomislav
- Dynasty: Trpimirović
- Father: Trpimir I
- Religion: Christianity

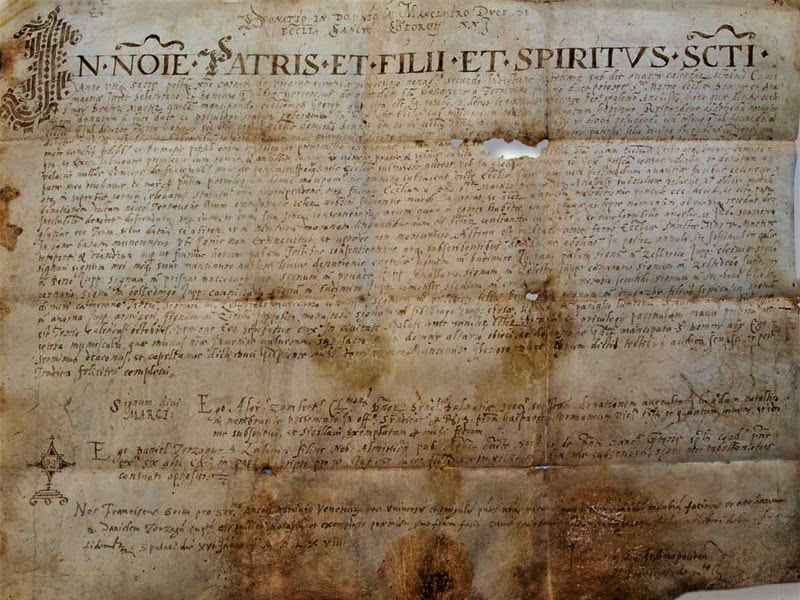
Duke Muncimir's charter from 892 (transcript): Muncimiro, divino munere Croatorum dux ("Muncimir, with God's help, Duke of the Croats").

Muncimir (Latin: Muncimiro), sometimes called Mutimir, was a duke (Croatian: knez) of the Duchy of Croatia and reigned from 892 to around 910. He was a member of the House of Trpimirović.

== Biography ==
Muncimir succeeded Branimir in 892 as the Duke of Croatia, restoring the line of the House of Trpimirović to the throne of Croatia. He reigned from Biaći near Trogir (today in Kaštela). Muncimir took control of Croatia and ruled it independently of both Pope and Byzantium as divino munere Croatorum dux ("with God's help, Duke of the Croats").

Duke Muncimir restored to the Archbishopric of Split the lands that were taken away from it and given to the Bishopric of Nin by Branimir. In his charter, in which he reinforces his father's decisions about church lands, for the first time we can see the organization of the duke's court. Also, for the first time, the royal seal (anulo) was mentioned.

During his rule there was significant activity of the Hungarians in the vicinity of his realm. In the late 9th century the Hungarians crossed the Carpathians and entered the Carpathian Basin. They invaded northern Italy and also defeated Duke Braslav from the Duchy of Pannonia, endangering Croatia. During Muncimir's reign, the exiled Prince Petar Gojniković of the Serbian House of Vlastimirović that stayed in Croatia returned to Serbia and seized power there. Prince Petar exiled his cousins who were pretenders to the Grand Princely throne: Pribislav, Bran and Stefan; whom Muncimir received and put under his protection.

He was succeeded by Tomislav, first king of Croatia. The family relationship between Muncimir and Tomislav is unknown; Tomislav was probably Muncimir's son.

Today, it is known existence of one epigraphic inscription (from Uzdolje near Knin), that bears the name of Duke Muncimir.

== Family ==
Muncimir was probably the third son of Trpimir I and brother of Petar and Zdeslav, since in his charter dated to 892, in the time of his rule, Muncimir stated that "he returned to his father's throne," which was usurped by Branimir.

Muncimir of Croatia House of Trpimirović
Regnal titles
| Preceded by Branimir | Duke of the Croats c. 892–910 | Succeeded by Tomislav |
