= Šopot =

- Village
- Interactive map of Šopot
- Location within Croatia
- Coordinates: 44°01′10″N 15°35′25″E
- Country: Croatia
- County: Zadar
- Municipality: Benkovac

Area
  - Total: 6.6 km^{2} (2.5 sq mi)

Population (2021)
  - Total: 323
  - Density: 49/km^{2} (130/sq mi)
- Time zone: UTC+1 (CET)
  - Summer (DST): UTC+2 (CEST)

Šopot is a village in Croatia. It is connected by the D27 state road. The name of the village comes from OCS word *sopotъ and means resurgence. Branimir Inscription was found in the place among the ruins of medieval church, also founded by duke Branimir.
