= Iljko =

An unnamed son of Domagoj, according to older historiography named Iljko which is probably an erroneous translation of Latin: Yllicus, was a duke (Croatian: knez) in Croatia from 876 until 878.

The name Iljko has later generally been accepted that it was a consequence of a wrong translation of the Chronicle of Dandolo, a Latin text written by Andrea Dandolo in the 14th century. The name of the unknown duke was probably the result of Dandolo's fantasy. During the specified timespan a son of Domagoj ruled Croatia, but his name was not preserved (as mentioned by John the Deacon). Recently were attempts identifying him with the duke Višeslav of Croatia.

== See also ==
- Domagojević dynasty
- List of rulers of Croatia

Regnal titles
Preceded by Domagoj	Duke of Croatia; 876–878	Succeeded by Zdeslav
