= Zdeslav, Duke of Croatia =

Zdeslav

Duke of Croatia
- Reign: 878 – May 879
- Predecessor: Unnamed son of Domagoj
- Successor: Branimir
- Died: May 879 near Knin
- Dynasty: Trpimirović
- Father: Trpimir I
- Religion: Christianity

Zdeslav (Croatian pronunciation: [zdêslaʋ], Latin: Sedesclavus) was Duke of Croatia from 878 until his death in 879. He was from the Trpimirović dynasty.

== Biography ==
Zdeslav was the son of Trpimir I. After his father's death in 864, an uprising was launched by a powerful Croatian nobleman from Knin called Domagoj. Zdeslav was exiled along with his brothers Petar and Muncimir to Constantinople. Domagoj died in 876, and was succeeded by his son. Zdeslav overthrew him in 878 with the help of the Byzantines, expelled Domagoj's sons and restored peace with Venice. The peace, at least in the case of Croatia, would practically last until the end of 10th century. He most probably acknowledged the supreme rule of Byzantine Emperor Basil I, and Dalmatia (theme) influence expanded further into land, but not much.

In 879, Pope John VIII asked Duke Zdeslav for an armed escort and protection for his legate who was crossing Croatia on his way to Bulgaria, ruled by Boris I. In early May 879, Zdeslav was killed by arrows near Knin in an uprising led by Branimir, a relative of Domagoj, possibly instigated by Pope John VIII fearing Byzantine power. However, something like that would have happened anyway because both Byzantine and Carolingian powers diminished in the region.

Zdeslav of Croatia House of Trpimirović Died: 879
Regnal titles
Preceded by Domagoj's unnamed son	Duke of the Croats; 878–879	Succeeded by Branimir
