= List of dukes and kings of Croatia =

This is a complete list of dukes and kings of Croatia (Croatian: knez, kralj) under domestic ethnic and elected dynasties during the Duchy of Croatia (until 925), the Kingdom of Croatia (925–1102), the Kingdom of Croatia and Dalmatia (1102–1526 in union with Kingdom of Hungary, 1527–1868 under Habsburg dynasty ending with 1868–1918 Kingdom of Croatia-Slavonia).

This article follows the monarch's title number according to Hungarian succession for convenience. For example, the Hungarian monarch Béla IV is according to Croatian succession correctly titled Béla III. This is because Hungarians had a king named Béla prior to the incorporation of Croatia under the Hungarian Crown but the Croats did not.

== Early history ==
The details of the arrival of the Croats in the Balkans are sparsely documented by more or less reliable historical sources. Around late 6th and early 7th century, they migrated from White Croatia (around present-day Galicia). According to a legend recorded in the 10th-century De Administrando Imperio, the Croats came to their present region under the leadership of five brothers (called Kloukas, Lobelos, Kosentzis, Mouchlo, and Chrobatos) and of two sisters (called Touga and Bouga), and successfully fought and expelled the Pannonian Avars influence in the Roman province of Dalmatia. The Croats started gradually converting to Christianity under the rule of Porga in the 7th century.

=== Early archons of Croats (7th century) ===
Name	Reign	Notes
Father of Porga	first part of the 7th century	Archon when the Croats fought and expelled the Pannonian Avars and received approval by Heraclius (610–641) to settle in Dalmatia.
Porga	first part of the 7th century	Archon when the Croats started to be baptized into Christianity during the time of Heraclius (610–641), or Constans II (641–668).

== Dukes of Lower Pannonia (8th century–896) ==
The areas of modern-day Croatia located in the Pannonian plain had also been settled by Slavic tribes in the early Middle Ages, and history recorded some of their rulers.

Portrait	Name	Reign start	Reign end	Notes
	Vojnomir	c. 790	c. 810	
Non-contemporary	Ljudevit	c. 810	c. 823	
	Ratimir	c. 829	c. 838	
	Braslav	c. 882	c. 896	Had for spouse Ventescela.

== Dukes of Croatia (8th century–925) ==
The common chronology of the dukes and kings of Croatia was conceptualized by Franjo Rački and Ferdo Šišić, but although generally accepted, has several controversial claims about the 9th and 10th century line of Trpimirović dynasty. In their interpretation of the De Administrando Imperio (which is mentioning in chronological order prince Terpimer father of Krasimer, prince Krasimer father of Miroslav who was killed by ban Pribina) the rulers, including Trpimir known from other sources as ruling cca. 845–864, have actually ruled in the first part of the 10th century and invented Trpimir II whose not mentioned in historical sources.

- Šišić's old chronology: Borna, Vladislav, Mislav, Trpimir I, his son Zdeslav, Domagoj, unnamed Domagoj's son, Zdeslav, Branimir, Muncimir, Tomislav, Trpimir II, Krešimir I, Miroslav, Michael Krešimir II with Helen of Zadar, Stephen Držislav, Svetoslav Suronja, Gojslav, Krešimir III, Stephen I, Petar Krešimir IV, and lastly Demetrius Zvonimir with brief rule of Stephen II and Petar Snačić.
- Komatina's revised chronology (1): Borna, Vladislav, Mislav, Trpimir, Zdeslav, Domagoj, unnamed Domagoj's son, Zdeslav, Branimir, Muncimir, Krešimir I, Miroslav, Tomislav I, Michael Krešimir II with Helen of Zadar, Stephen Držislav, Svetoslav Suronja, Gojslav, Krešimir III, Stephen I, Petar Krešimir IV, and lastly Demetrius Zvonimir with brief rule of Stephen II and Petar Snačić.
- Đaković's revised chronology (2): Borna, Vladislav, Mislav, Trpimir, Krešimir I, Miroslav, Domagoj, unnamed Domagoj's son, Zdeslav, Branimir, Muncimir, Tomislav I, Michael Krešimir II with Helen of Zadar, Stephen Držislav, Svetoslav Suronja, Gojslav, Krešimir III, Stephen I, Petar Krešimir IV, and lastly Demetrius Zvonimir with brief rule of Stephen II and Petar Snačić.

Višeslav of Croatia, who left behind a baptismal font day, which mentioned him being a duke, used to be considered by Croatian historiography as a duke of the Croats, but the evidence for most of the claims regarding him is too scarce.

Portrait	Name	Reign start	Reign end	Notes
Non-contemporary	Borna	c. 810	821	Vassal of Frankish Emperor Charlemagne. His titles were Duke of the Guduscani, Duke of Dalmatia and Liburnia. Since Croats inhabited those areas at the time, he is considered a Croatian duke. His uncle was Ljudemisl (c. 823)
	Vladislav	821	c. 835	Nephew of Borna.
	Mislav	c. 835	c. 845	
House of Trpimirović
	Trpimir	c. 845	864	Founder of the Trpimirović dynasty
	Zdeslav	864	864	Son of Trpimir
House of Domagojević
	Domagoj	864	876	Overthrew Zdeslav.
	Unnamed	876	878	Son of Domagoj. Later killed during a civil war.
House of Trpimirović
	Zdeslav	878	879	Restored ruler, overthrew the unnamed son of Domagoj. Killed by Branimir in May 879.
House of Domagojević
	Branimir	879	c. 892	Had for spouse earliest known Croatian female ruler Maruša (Mariosa).
House of Trpimirović
	Muncimir	892	910	Son of Trpimir. Also called Mutimir.
	Tomislav I	910	925	

== Kings of Croatia (925–1102) ==
In his letter from 925, Pope John X refers to Tomislav I of Trpimirović dynasty as Rex Chroatorum (King of the Croats). All Croatian rulers after Tomislav I held the title of King of Croatia. This is confirmed by epigraphic inscription mentioning the earliest known Croatian queen (regina) Domaslava dated to first half of 10th century.

Portrait	Name	Reign start	Reign end	Notes
House of Trpimirović
	Tomislav I	925	928	Possibly the son of Muncimir. After his death, civil wars weakened the state and some territory, including Bosnia, was lost. His title as rex (king) is based on two contemporary documents: a correspondence dated 925 where the Pope John X addresses him with the title Rex Croatorum (King of the Croats); a transcript from the First Church Council of Split where he is also referred to as rex; He was also addressed as princeps (prince) and dux (duke) on other occasions. Nevertheless, in modern Croatia he is traditionally considered the first (and arguably the most famous) Croatian king.
	Trpimir II	928	935	Younger brother or son of Tomislav
	Krešimir I	935	945	Son of Trpimir II
	Miroslav	945	949	Son of Krešimir I
	Michael Krešimir II the Great	949	969	Younger brother of Miroslav. Michael Krešimir ruled jointly with his wife Queen Helen of Zadar. During their reign, the Croatian Kingdom regained previously lost territories, including Bosnia. Upon Michael Krešimir's death in 969, his wife ruled as regent for their underage son Stephen Držislav.
Non-contemporary	Helen of Zadar	969	976	Ruled as regent for her son Stephen Držislav from 969 until her death 8 October 976.
	Stephen Držislav	969	997	Son of Michael Krešimir and Queen Helen of Zadar. He received royal insignia as an act of recognition from the Byzantine Emperor and was crowned by the Archbishop of Split in Biograd in 988. Thomas the Archdeacon's Historia Salonitana names him as the King of Croatia (rex).
	Svetoslav Suronja	997	1000	He was the oldest son of king Stephen Držislav, from whom he received the title of duke, and was designated as his successor. Dethroned by his brothers Krešimir III and Gojslav.
	Gojslav	1000	1020	Younger brother of Svetoslav Suronja. Co-ruled with Krešimir III.
	Krešimir III	1000	1030	Younger brother of Svetoslav Suronja. Ruled alone after the death of Gojslav in 1020
	Stephen I	1030	1058	Son of Krešimir III.
	Peter Krešimir IV	1058	1074	Son of Stephen I. During his reign the Croatian Kingdom reached its peak. Near the end of his reign, having no sons, Peter Krešimir designated Demetrius Zvonimir as his heir.
	Demetrius Zvonimir	1075/76	1089	Cousin of Peter Krešimir IV. He received royal insigia as an act of recognition from the Holy See and was crowned at the Basilica of Saint Peter and Moses at Salona in 1075 or 1076. Married Princess Helen, daughter of King Béla I of Hungary (c. 1063).
	Stephen II	1089	1090/91	Son of Gojslav II who was younger brother of King Peter Krešimir IV. He was due to succeed Peter Krešimir IV but was sidelined by the people and clergy in 1075 who instead bestowed the title of king on Demetrius Zvonimir. He was the last member of the Trpimirović dynasty and last native king of Croatia to rule the entire medieval Croatian Kingdom.
House of Árpád
	Ladislaus I	1091	1095	After the death of his brother-in-law King Demetrius Zvonimir in 1089, King Ladislaus I of Hungary (1077–1095) ruled in Slavonia. After the death of Stephen II, he conquered big part of Croatia and adopted the title King of Croatia in 1091. He set his nephew Álmos to rule as his proxy with the title of duke (1091–1095), but he was recognized only by the Hungarian nobility. He was a claimant to the throne due to the fact that his sister was married to the late Croatian king Zvonimir who died without an heir (son Radovan predeceased Zvonimir), however, kingship over all of Croatia would not be achieved until the reign of his successor Coloman.
House of Snačić
	Petar Snačić	1093/1095	1097	Petar Snačić, a Ban of Croatia, was elected to rule by the Croatian nobles, likewise before him his uncle Slavac who briefly appropriated the royal title. He assumed the throne amid deep tension throughout the Kingdom. He fought with Coloman of Hungary for control of Croatia and was killed at the Battle of Gvozd Mountain in 1097. Petar was the last native king of Croatia. From 1102 onwards, the Kings of Hungary were also Kings of Croatia, because of the political union of the two crowns.

== Under the Hungarian Crown (1102–1526) ==
From 1102, the reigning King of Hungary was also the ruler of the Kingdom of Croatia in agreement with the Croatian nobles (see Pacta conventa). Croatia was governed on his behalf by a viceroy (ban) and a parliament (sabor). In 1409 Ladislaus of Naples sold his rights to Dalmatia to Republic of Venice for 100,000 ducats.

Portrait	Name	Reign	Consort(s)	Notes
House of Árpád
	Koloman	1102 – 3 February 1116 (14 years)	Euphemia of Kiev	King of Hungary from 1095 and King of Croatia from 1102 until his death in 1116. Koloman, supported by Pannonian Croats, defeated an army of Croatian and Dalmatian nobles allied to Petar Snačić at the Battle of Gvozd Mountain. Recognized by a council (sabor) of Croatian nobles and crowned as King of Croatia in 1102. Nephew of Ladislaus I.
	Stjepan II	3 February 1116 – 3 April 1131 (15 years)	A daughter of Robert I of Capua	Son of Koloman.
	Bela II the Blind	3 April 1131 – 13 February 1141 (9 years)	Helena of Serbia	Cousin of Stjepan II and uncle of Koloman.
	Gejza II	13 February 1141 – 31 May 1162 (21 years)	Euphrosyne of Kiev (m. 1146)	Son of Bela II the Blind.
	Stjepan III	31 May 1162 – 4 March 1172 (9 years)	Agnes of Austria (m. 1168)	Son of Gejza II. Rule contested from 1162 to 1163.
	Ladislav II	31 May 1162 – 14 January 1163 (7 months)	None	Rebel anti-king, brother of Stjepan IV, uncle of Stjepan III, younger brother of Gejza II and son of Bela II.
	Stjepan IV	14 January 1163 – June 1163 (5 months)	Maria Komnene	Rebel anti-king, brother of Ladislav II, uncle of Stjepan III, younger brother of Gejza II and son of Bela II.
	Bela III	4 March 1172 – 13 April 1196 (24 years)	Agnes of Antioch (m. 1172–d. 1184); Margaret of France (m. 1186)	Brother of Stjepan III. Son of Gejza II.
	Emerik	13 April 1196 – 30 November 1204 (8 years)	Constance of Aragon (m. 1198)	Son of Bela III.
	Ladislav III	30 November 1204 – 7 May 1205 (6 months)	None	Son of Emerik. Crowned at age 4-5 and died six months later.
	Andrija II	7 May 1205 – 21 September 1235 (30 years)	Gertrude of Merania (d. 1213); Yolanda of Courtenay (m. 1215–d. 1233); Beatrice of Este (m. 1234)	Uncle of Ladislav III, brother of Emerik and son of Bela III. In 1222, he issued a Golden Bull, which established the rights of noblemen, including the right to disobey the king when he acted contrary to law.
	Bela IV	21 September 1235 – 3 May 1270 (34 years)	Maria Laskarina	Son of Andrija II. Ruled during the first Mongol invasion (1241–1242). In 1242, he issued a Golden Bull which proclaimed Zagreb and Samobor a free royal city.
	Stjepan V	3 May 1270 – 6 August 1272 (2 years)	Elizabeth the Cuman	Son of Bela IV. Also Prince of Slavonia from 1246 to 1257.
	Ladislav IV the Cuman	6 August 1272 – 10 July 1290 (17 years)	Elizabeth of Sicily	Son of Stjepan V. He lived with the nomad Cuman tribes contrary to the wishes of the Catholic clergy and was thus excommunicated.
	Andrija III the Venetian	4 August 1290 – 14 January 1301 (10 years)	Fenenna of Kuyavia (d. 1295); Agnes of Austria (m. 1296)	First cousin once removed of Ladislav IV. Grandson of Andrija II. Rule contested by Carlo Martel and Carlo I.
House of Přemyslid
	Vjenceslav (Anti-king)	27 August 1301 – 9 October 1305 (4 years)	Viola of Teschen (m. 1305)	Great-great-grandson of Bela IV. King of Bohemia. Rule contested by Carlo I. Reign was declared invalid by the Holy See.
House of Wittelsbach
	Otto (Anti-king)	9 October 1305 – May 1307 (1 year)	None	Grandson of Bela IV. Duke of Lower Bavaria. Rule contested by Carlo I.
House of Anjou
	Karlo Martel	1290 – 12 August 1295 (5 years)	Clemence of Austria (d. 1293/1295)	Set up by Pope Nicholas IV and the ecclesiastical party as successor of his maternal uncle, the childless Ladislav IV the Cuman. His title as king was recognized by the Šubić and Kőszegi noble families. He was crowned in Croatia. Rule contested by Andrija III.
	Karlo I	14 January 1301 – 16 July 1342 (41 years)	Maria of Galicia (disputed); Maria of Bytom (m. 1306–d. 1317); Beatrice of Luxembourg (m. 1318–d. 1319) Elizabeth of Poland (m. 1320)	Son of Carlo Martel. Also called Carlo Robert. Rule contested by Vjenceslav and Otto from 1301 until 1307.
	Ludovik I the Great	16 July 1342 – 11 September 1382 (40 years)	Margaret of Bohemia (d. 1349); Elizabeth of Bosnia (m. 1353)	Also King of Poland from 1370 to 1382.
	Marija	11 September 1382 – December 1385 (3 years, first reign); 24 February 1386 – 17 May 1395 (9 years, second reign)	Žigmund (m. 1385)	Married Žigmund (Sigismund) of Luxembourg, son of Holy Roman Emperor Charles IV; after he invaded Upper Hungary in 1385. After the assassination of Carlo II in 1386, Marija began her second reign as co-'king' with her husband Žigmund.
	Karlo II	31 December 1385 – 24 February 1386 (1 month)	Margaret of Durazzo	Also King of Naples. After Marija renounced the throne, Carlo II of Naples was crowned as King on 31 December 1385. He was wounded in an assassination attempt at the instigation of Mary's mother on 7 February 1386 and died on 24 February that same year.
	Ladislav V	1390–1414 (24 years)	Costanza Chiaramonte (ann. 1392); Mary of Lusignan (m. 1403–d. 1404); Mary of Enghien (m. 1406)	Son of Carlo II. He claimed the Crown of Hungary and Croatia since 1390 in opposition to Marija and Žigmund. Was crowned but only had control over Zadar.
House of Kotromanić
	Stjepan Tvrtko	1390–1391 (1 year)	Doroteja Bugarska (m. 1374)	Tvrtko succeeded in conquering large parts of Slavonia, Dalmatia, and Croatia proper. In May 1390, the cities and the Dalmatian islands finally surrendered to Tvrtko, who then started calling himself "by the grace of God king of Rascia, Bosnia, Dalmatia, Croatia, and Pomorje". His realm now encompassed much of Slavonia, Dalmatia, and Croatia south of Velebit. Tvrtko's sudden death in 1391 prevented him from solidifying the Kotromanić hold on Croatian lands.
	Stjepan Dabiša	1391–1394 (4 years)	Jelena Gruba (m. 1391)	In the first years of his reign, Dabiša successfully maintained the integrity of Tvrtko's Kingdom of Bosnia, which included not only Bosnia proper, but also Croatia proper, Dalmatia, Zachlumia, and Rascia. Dabiša submitted to Sigismund. He resigned Croatia and Dalmatia to the Hungarian king and, with the agreement of his vassals, recognized him as his feudal overlord as well as heir designate to the Bosnian throne.
House of Luxembourg
	Žigmund	31 March 1387 – 9 December 1437 (50 years)	Marija (d. 1395); Barbara of Celje (m. 1305)	Son of Holy Roman Emperor and King of Bohemia Charles IV. Ruled jure uxoris until his wife Marija died in 1395. Was crowned King of Bohemia in 1419, and elected Holy Roman Emperor in 1433.
House of Habsburg
	Albert I	18 December 1437 – 27 October 1439 (1 year)	Elizabeth of Luxembourg	Son-in-law of Žigmund. He was also King of Bohemia and Germany from 1438 until his death in 1439. First Habsburg king.
House of Jagiellon
	Vladislav I	15 May 1440 – 10 November 1444 (4 years)	None	Also King of Poland from 1434 until his alleged death at the Battle of Varna. Rule contested by Ladislav V, the posthumous son of Albert I.
House of Habsburg
	Ladislav V the Posthumous	10 November 1444 – 23 November 1457 (13 years)	None	Son of Albert I. Born in 1440 after his father's death, spent most of his life in captivity. Rule contested by Vladislav I between 1440 and 1444. He had no children and was the last of the Albertinian line of the Habsburg dynasty.
House of Hunyadi
	Matija I	24 January 1458 – 6 April 1490 (32 years)	Catherine of Poděbrady (m. 1463–d. 1464) Beatrice of Naples (m. 1475)	Elected by the nobles. He was son of John Hunyadi. Also King of Bohemia from 1469 until his death in 1490, a title he contested with Vladislav II.
House of Jagiellon
	Vladislav II	15 July 1490 – 13 May 1516 (25 years)	Beatrice of Naples (m. 1490–ann. 1500); Anne of Foix-Candale (m. 1502–d. 1506)	Also King of Bohemia from 1471 (contested with Matija I until 1490). The Hungarian nobles elected him king after his supporters defeated the son of Matija I who relinquished his claim to the Hungarian throne prior to that. Died in 1516.
	Ludovik II	13 May 1516 – 29 August 1526 (10 years)	Mary of Austria	Also King of Bohemia from 1516 until his death in 1526 at the Battle of Mohács. Last king not from the Habsburg dynasty.
House of Zápolya
	Ivan I (Anti-king)	10 November 1526 – 22 July 1540 (13 years)	Isabella Jagiellon (m. 1539)	Claimed the throne with the support of Hungarian nobles, and later Suleiman the Magnificent. Rule contested with Ferdinand I. Ivan I made an agreement with Ferdinand I to recognize his right to reunite Hungary after Ivan I's death, but shortly after the birth of his son Ivan, and on his deathbed, Ivan I bequeathed his realm to his son.
	Ivan II (Anti-king)	13 September 1540 – 16 August 1570 (29 years)	None	Son of Ivan I. Elected by supporters of Ivan I as King of Hungary. Claim contested by Ferdinand I and Maximilian. Never crowned.

== Under the Habsburg monarchy (1527–1918) ==
On 1 January 1527, the Croatian Parliament met in Cetin to elect Ferdinand I of Habsburg as the new King of Croatia. The Habsburg monarchy had annexed the lands of Dalmatia after the Napoleonic War of the First Coalition. The Kingdom of Dalmatia was a crown land of the Austrian Empire (1815–1867) and the Cisleithanian half of Austria-Hungary (1867–1918).

Portrait	Name	Reign	Consort(s)	Notes
House of Habsburg
	Ferdinand I	1 January 1527 – 25 July 1564 (37 years)	Anne of Hungary (d. 1547)	Brother-in-law of Ludovik II. Claimed the throne according to the agreement between the House of Jagiellon and the House of Habsburg. Elected by the Sabor as King in January 1527.
	Maximilian	8 September 1563 – 12 October 1576 (13 years)	Maria of Spain	Son of Ferdinand I. Ruled during Battle of Szigetvár and Croatian-Slovene Peasant Revolt.
	Rudolf	25 September 1572 – 26 June 1608 (35 years)	None	Son of Maximilian. Ruled during Battle of Sisak. Abdicated in favor of his younger brother Matthias II.
	Matija II	26 June 1608 – 20 March 1619 (10 years)	Anna of Tyrol (d. 1618)	Brother of Rudolf and son of Maximilian.
	Ferdinand II	1 July 1618 – 15 February 1637 (18 years)	Eleonora of Mantua (m. 1622)	First cousin of Matija II, and Grandson of Ferdinand I. In 1630, he issued Statuta Valachorum that placed Vlachs (mainly Orthodox Serbs) in the Military Frontier under the direct rule by Vienna, removing the Sabor's jurisdiction over them.
	Ferdinand III	8 December 1625 – 2 April 1657 (31 years)	Maria Anna of Spain (m. 1631–d. 1646); Maria Leopoldine of Austria (m. 1648–d. 1649); Eleonora of Mantua (m. 1651)	Son of Ferdinand II. Ended the Thirty Years War.
	Ferdinand IV	16 June 1647 – 9 July 1654 (7 years)	None	Son of Ferdinand III and co-king.
	Leopold I	27 June 1657 – 5 May 1705 (47 years)	Margaret Theresa of Spain (m. 1666–d. 1673); Claudia Felicitas of Austria (m. 1673–d. 1676); Eleonore Magdalene of Neuburg (m. 1676)	Son of Ferdinand III. Crushed the Zrinski–Frankopan Conspiracy and abolished the right of the Sabor to elect a king. In 1669, he founded the University of Zagreb.
	Josip I	5 May 1705 – 17 April 1711 (10 years)	Wilhelmina Amalia of Brunswick	Son of Leopold I.
	Karlo III	11 April 1711 – 20 October 1740 (29 years)	Elizabeth Christina of Brunswick	Brother of Josip I and son of Leopold I. Issued and edict called the Pragmatic Sanction where he acknowledged female inheritance of the Austrian crown after extinction of the male line and thus enabling his daughter Marija Terezija to become sovereign.
	Marija Terezija	20 October 1740 – 29 November 1780 (40 years)	Francis I, Holy Roman Emperor (died 1765)	Daughter of Karlo III. Divided Croatia into counties (županije). In 1767, she formed a Croatian Royal Council (Consilium Regium) until 1779 when she abolished it. She conducted military and economy reforms, especially concerning serfdom and schooling.
	Josip II	29 November 1780 – 20 February 1790 (9 years)	None	Son of Marija Terezija. Abolished serfdom and conducted a partial Germanization of Croatian lands.
	Leopold II	20 February 1790 – 1 March 1792 (2 years)	Maria Louisa of Spain	Brother of Josip II and son of Marija Terezija.
	Franjo	1 March 1792 – 2 March 1835 (43 years)	Maria Theresa of Sicily (d. 1807); Maria Ludovica of Modena (m. 1808–d. 1816); Caroline Augusta of Bavaria (m. 1816)	Son of Leopold II. Consolidated the Habsburg Monarchy into the Austrian Empire in response to the downfall of the Holy Roman Empire. Nominally the last Holy Roman Emperor.
	Ferdinand V	28 September 1830 – 2 December 1848 (18 years)	Maria Anna of Sardinia (m. 1831)	Son of Franjo. Being epileptic, he abdicated in favour of his nephew Franjo Josip due to the Revolutions of 1848. Ferdinand V died in 1875.
	Franjo Josip	2 December 1848 – 21 November 1916 (67 years)	Elizabeth of Bavaria (m. 1854–d. 1898)	Nephew of Ferdinand V and Grandson of Franjo. Longest reigning Croatian monarch. During his reign, Croatian lands (Croatia, Slavonia and Dalmatia) were unified by Ban Josip Jelačič in 1848. In 1867, he reorganized the monarchy into a dual Austrian and Hungarian part. From 1868, the Kingdom of Croatia-Slavonia was an autonomous kingdom within the Kingdom of Hungary.
	Blessed Karlo IV	21 November 1916 – 29 October 1918 (2 years)	Zita of Bourbon-Parma	Grand-nephew of Franjo Josip and Great-great-grandson of Franjo. In his coronation oath to the Sabor (Croatian Parliament), he acknowledged the unity of Croatia, Dalmatia and Slavonia with Rijeka. During the last days of the monarchy he accepted the trialist manifest on creating a so-called "Zvonimir's Kingdom". He reigned until 1918, when he renounced participation in state affairs, but did not abdicate. The Sabor ended the union of Croatia with Hungary and Austria and severed all ties on 29 October 1918 but never dethroned King Karlo IV. He spent the remaining years of his life attempting to restore the monarchy until his death in 1922. Beatified by the Catholic Church.

== Kings of Yugoslavia (1918–1945) ==
After the World War I and the breakup of Austria-Hungary, Croatia joined a newly formed State of Slovenes, Croats and Serbs as declared in the Zagreb Resolution (1918). Following a brief period of self-rule by National Council of Slovenes, Croats and Serbs (which was recognised by the Croatian Parliament, which beforehand proclamined national independence severing its ties to Austria-Hungary and Kingdom of Hungary and nullified the Croatian–Hungarian Settlement), after the controversial Geneva Declaration (1918) that state became part of the Kingdom of Serbs, Croats and Slovenes under the Karađorđević dynasty (which was not completely accepted by the National Council nor ever confirmed by the Croatian Parliament). After the Vidovdan Constitution (1921), the Croatian Parliament temporarily ceased to exist. It was followed by the 6 January Dictatorship (1929) and the 1931 Yugoslav Constitution.

The name of the kingdom was changed in 1929, amid unitarianist reforms, to the Kingdom of Yugoslavia. After the Treaty of Rapallo in 1920 Istria and parts of Dalmatia were annexed to Kingdom of Italy. On the basis of the Cvetković–Maček Agreement, and the Decree on the Banate of Croatia dated 24 August 1939, the Banate of Croatia was created. Under the Agreement was again elected Croatian Parliament (sabor) and a crown-appointed ban would decide internal matters in Croatia.

Portrait	Name	Reign	Consort(s)	Notes
House of Karađorđević
	Petar I	1 December 1918 – 16 August 1921 (2 years)	Zorka of Montenegro (m. 1883)	Son of Aleksandar, Prince of Serbia. After King Alexander I Obrenović was murdered during the May Coup of 1903, Peter Karađorđević became the new king of Serbia. Later he became King of the Serbs, Croats and Slovenes.
	Aleksandar	16 August 1921 – 9 October 1934 (13 years)	Maria of Romania (m. 1922)	Son of Petar I. He changed the name of the country to Kingdom of Yugoslavia and established a royal dictatorship. Assassinated by the VMRO with Ustaše support in 1934 in Marseille.
	Petar II	9 October 1934 – 29 November 1945	Alexandra of Greece (m. 1944)	Son of Aleksandar. His uncle Pavle served as Regent until 1941. Part of the Yugoslav government-in-exile after the Axis invasion of Yugoslavia in April 1941. Monarchy was formally abolished in the Democratic Federal Yugoslavia on 29 November 1945.

== King of the Independent State of Croatia (1941–1943) ==
In 1941, Croatia was occupied by the Axis powers along with the rest of Yugoslavia. The Independent State of Croatia was set as a puppet state of Nazi Germany and Fascist Italy. Soon after its creation, the state government passed three laws on the creation of the Crown of Zvonimir, which made the country de jure a kingdom. Three days later the Treaties of Rome were signed. The Italian Prince Aimone of Savoy-Aosta was designated King of Croatia. Numerous Adriatic islands and a portion of Dalmatia were annexed by Italy, which all combined to become the Italian Governonate of Dalmatia. On 10 September 1943 Independent State of Croatia declared that the Treaties of Rome were null and void and annexed the portion of Dalmatia that had been ceded to Italy.

Portrait	Name	Reign	Consort(s)	Notes
House of Savoy
	Tomislav II (King-designate)	18 May 1941 – 31 July 1943	Irene of Greece	Tomislav II established a Croatian royal office (kraljevski stol) in Florence and later in Rome. He had at first refused to assume the kingship in opposition to the Italian annexation of the Dalmatia region, and is therefore referred to in some sources as king designate. He abdicated on 31 July 1943 after the dismissal of Benito Mussolini on the orders of Victor Emmanuel III.

== After WWII ==
- List of heads of state of Yugoslavia (1945–1991)
- List of presidents of Croatia (1991–present)
- List of prime ministers of Croatia (1991–present)

== Claimants to the Croatian throne (since 1918) ==
Following the dissolution of Austria-Hungary and the end of the personal union in October 1918, several royal lines maintained claims or were designated as titular sovereigns over Croatian territory, countering the unification into the Kingdom of Serbs, Croats and Slovenes.

=== House of Habsburg-Lorraine (1918–present) ===
Portrait	Name	Pretendship	Consort(s)	Notes
	Charles IV (1887–1922)	1918–1922	Zita of Bourbon-Parma	Last reigning king (as Charles IV). Retained his claim to the Croatian crown in exile until his death.
	Otto von Habsburg (1912–2011)	1922–2007	Regina of Saxe-Meiningen	Head of the Imperial House. Renounced Austrian political claims in 1961, though historical dynastic rights remained active.
	Karl von Habsburg (born 1961)	2007–present	Francesca Thyssen-Bornemisza (1993–2017) Christian Nicolau de Almeida Reid (2022–present)	Head of the Imperial House since 2007.

=== House of Habsburg-Tuscany (1919–1931) ===
Portrait	Name	Pretendship	Consort(s)	Notes
	Leopold Salvator (1863–1931)	1919–1931	Blanca of Bourbon	Former Inspector General of the Imperial Artillery and patron of the Varaždin Civil Guard. Designated as titular monarch through a nationalist plot.

== Gallery ==
"Illyrian" coat of arms (considered oldest known symbol of Croatia)

Coat of arms of Croatia in the 14th and 15th century (later used as coat of arms of Dalmatia)

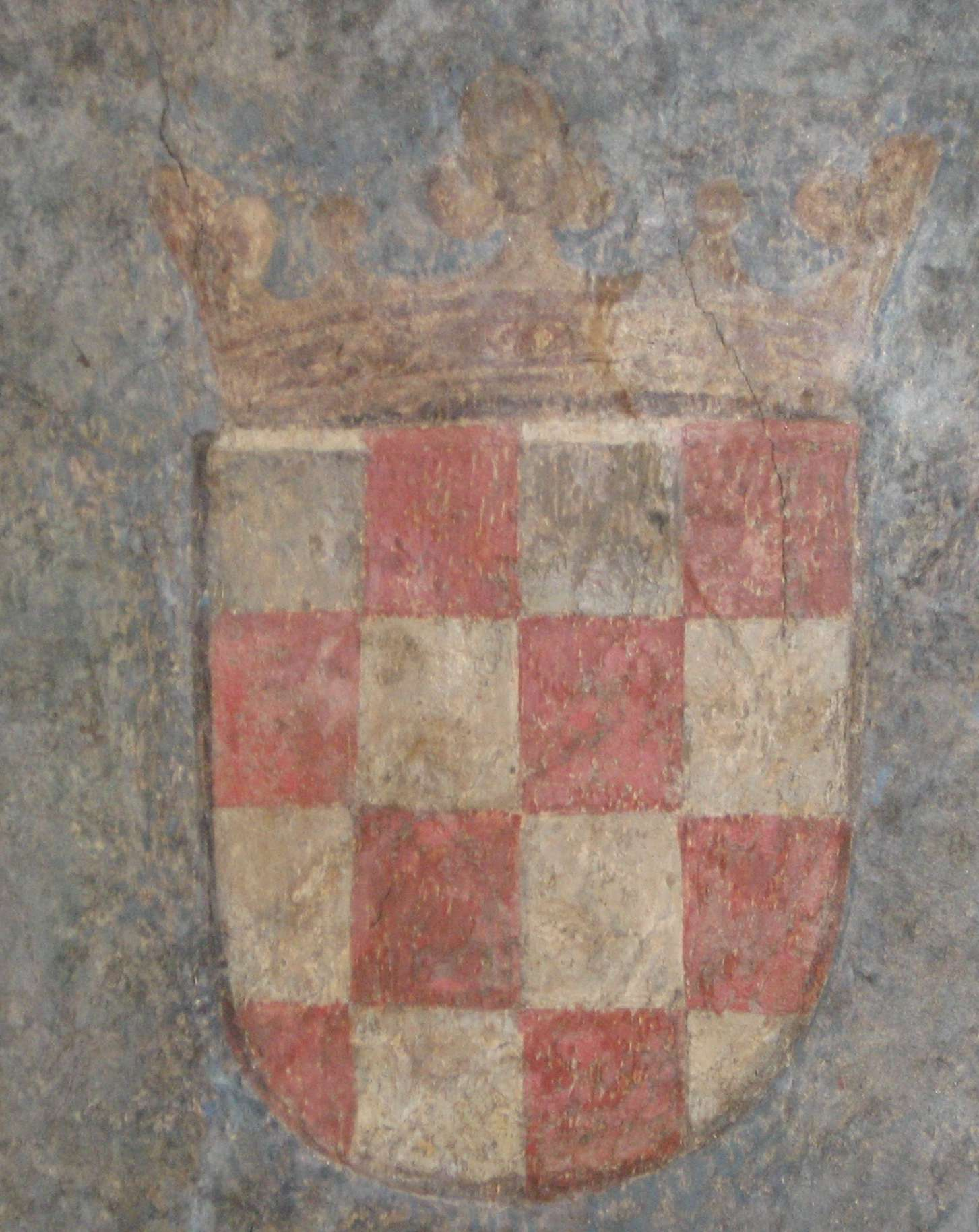
First known example of Croatian chequy as depicted in Innsbruck, Austria (1495)

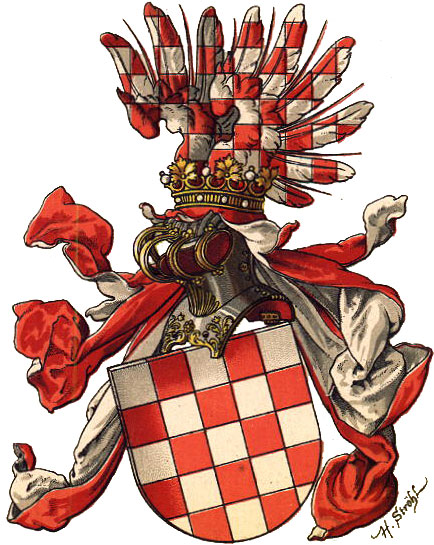
Coat of arms of Croatian Crown land (until 1868)

Kingdom of Croatia-Slavonia (1868–1918). The official version had St. Stephen's crown.

Coat of arms of Banovina of Croatia (1939–1941)

== "Duke of Croatia" ==
The title Duke of Croatia has been used widely:

- The Doges of Venice used it, with Byzantine approval, from c. 1100, when Hungary was in the process of absorbing the Kingdom of Croatia, until the Treaty of Zadar with Hungary in 1358.
- The Dukes of Merania, whose territory bordered Croatia, were sometimes called Dukes of Croatia in contemporary chronicles.
- Various Hungarian noblemen granted authority in the South Slav lands added Croatia to their title of Duke of Slavonia in the 13th and 14th centuries.

== See also ==
- History of Croatia
- Timeline of Croatian history
- Croatian nobility
- Croatian Parliament
- Ban of Croatia
- Ban of Slavonia
- Duke of Slavonia
- List of Hungarian monarchs (1102–1526)
- List of rulers of Austria (1527–1918)
- List of heads of state of Yugoslavia (1918–1991)
- List of presidents of Croatia (1991–present)
- List of prime ministers of Croatia (1991–present)
