= Pope John VIII =

Head of the Catholic Church from 872 to 882

- Bishop of Rome
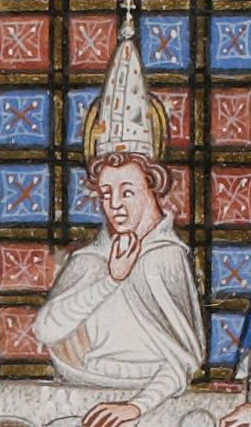
- Posthumous miniature of John VIII, 14th century
- Church: Catholic Church
- Papacy began: 14 December 872
- Papacy ended: 16 December 882
- Predecessor: Adrian II
- Successor: Marinus I

Personal details
- Born: Rome, Papal States
- Died: 16 December 882 Rome, Papal States

Pope John VIII (Latin: Ioannes VIII; died 16 December 882) was the bishop of Rome and leader of the Papal States from 14 December 872 to his death. He is often considered one of the most able popes of the 9th century.

John devoted much of his papacy to attempting to halt and reverse the Muslim gains in southern Italy and their march northwards. When his efforts to obtain assistance from either the Franks or the Byzantines failed, John strengthened the defences of Rome. He supported Methodius of Thessalonica in his mission to the Slavs, defended him against the Carolingian rulers and Bavarian clergy, and authorized the translation of the Bible into Old Church Slavonic. John also extended diplomatic recognition to the Duchy of Croatia and resolved the Photian schism. John's pontificate ended with his assassination, and the papacy became significantly weaker in the aftermath.

== Slavonic liturgy ==
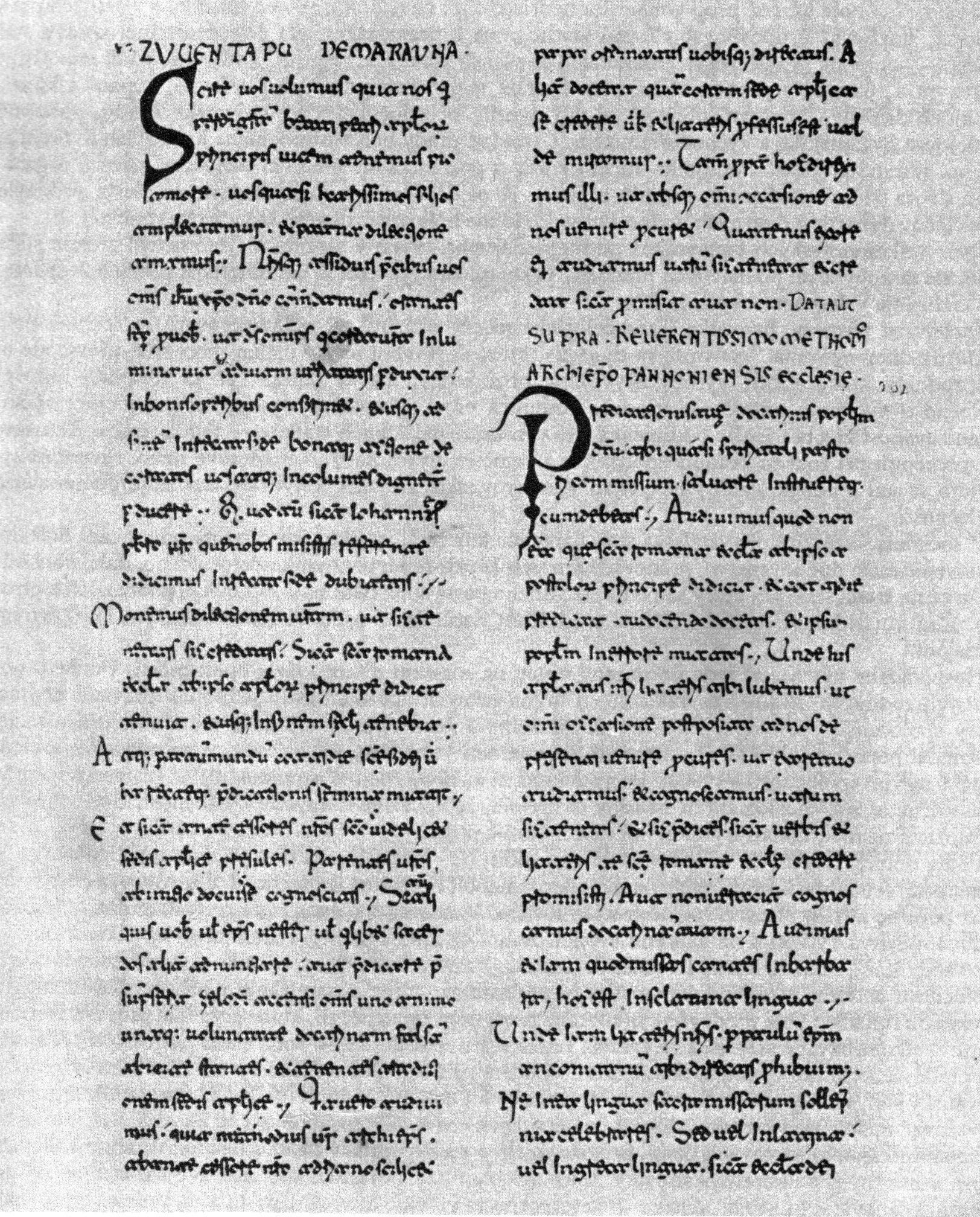
John VIII's letter to Svatopluk I of Moravia

Pope Adrian II consecrated Methodius of Thessalonica as archbishop and supported his mission to the Slavs. Unbeknownst to Rome, Methodius was imprisoned in 870 by the Carolingian King Louis the German and Bavarian bishops, who objected to his use of the Slavonic language in the liturgy and his encroachment on their jurisdiction in Moravia. Adrian II died in 872, and John VIII, a Roman native, was selected to succeed him. When Bishop Anno of Freising visited Rome, John inquired about the whereabouts of the missing Methodius, but Anno lied to him. In the summer of 873, John finally learned the truth. Furious, he forbade the celebration of mass in Bavaria until Methodius was released. After his release, Methodius came to Rome and convinced John to allow him to translate the Bible to Slavonic as well as to perform liturgy in Slavonic. John wrote in his letter to Svatopluk I of Moravia: "He who made three main languages – Hebrew, Greek, and Roman – also made all other languages to sing his praise and glory." – «… qui fecit tres linguas principales, Hebream scilicet, Grecam et Latinam, ipse creavit et alias omnes ad laudem et gloriam suam. …»

== Saracen incursions ==
As a young man, John witnessed the Arab raid against Rome. Their expansion into Italy was severely affecting the economy of the Papal States. After the raids against Campania and the Sabine Hills, Pope John asked for military aid from Emperor Charles the Bald and later Count Boso of Provence. His efforts failed and he was forced to pay tribute to the Emirate of Sicily. It was said the pope ultimately paid 25,000 silver mancusi to the Arabs to secure peace for the Church's territories. The threatening Muslim military presence (which he believed was God's punishment against "bad Christians"), coupled with alliances they formed with the local Christians, prompted John to promote "a new and uncompromisingly hostile view of the Saracens." This included a ban on forming alliances with the Muslims. However, his efforts proved unsuccessful, partly because Christian leaders viewed his calls for unity as an excuse to assert papal authority in southern Italy.

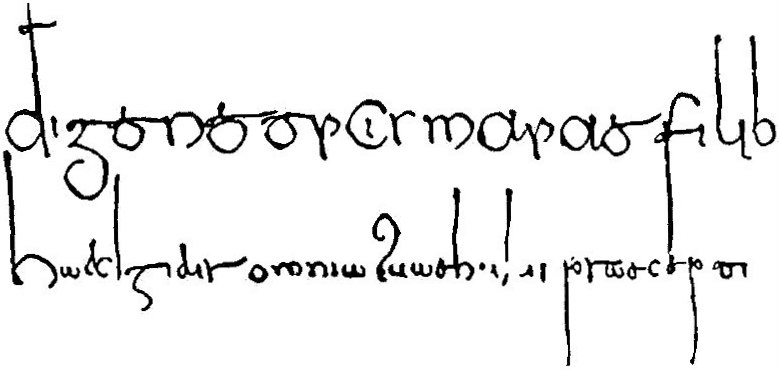
An 876 bull of John VIII

In 876, John VIII traveled throughout Campania in an effort to form an alliance among the cities of Salerno, Capua, Naples, Gaeta and Amalfi against Muslim raids. By 877, all five cities sent delegates to Traietto to formalize an alliance. Pope John VIII urged Charles to come to his defence in Italy. Charles again crossed the Alps, but this expedition was received with little enthusiasm by the nobles, and even by his regent in Lombardy, Boso, and they refused to join his army. At the same time Carloman of Bavaria, son of Louis the German, entered northern Italy. Charles, ill and in great distress, started on his way back to Gaul, but died while crossing the pass of Mont Cenis on 6 October 877.

Obtaining relatively little support from outside sources, John fell back on what resources he could command. He reinforced the walls previously restored by Pope Leo IV. As the Basilica of Saint Paul Outside the Walls was located outside the Aurelian Walls, and had been damaged in a Saracen raid, the pope fortified the basilica, the monastery, and the nearby dwellings of the peasants. He also founded a papal fleet.

== Constantinople issues ==
In 879, John recognised the reinstatement of Photios I as the legitimate patriarch of Constantinople. Photius had been condemned in 869 by Adrian II. This was undertaken mainly to appease the Byzantines, since in them he saw the only hope of removing the Arabs from Italy. It was commonly believed that some time afterward John VIII re-confirmed the excommunication of Photius, which eventually enabled Emperor Leo VI to move against Photius. However, modern scholarship, particularly influenced by Catholic scholar Francis Dvornik, has demonstrated this to be a Latin myth, as Photius died in visible perfect communion within the Roman Church.

John was anxious that the Duchy of Croatia would follow in the steps of Bulgaria, which had recently accepted the spiritual authority of Constantinople rather than that of Rome. After the overthrow of the pro-Byzantine Zdeslav in 879, John thanked the new duke, Branimir, for returning Croatia to papal jurisdiction. In return, John recognized Croatian independence from the Carolingians.

== Death ==
John VIII was assassinated in 882 by his own clerics; he was first poisoned, and then clubbed to death. The motives may have been his exhaustion of the papal treasury, his lack of support among the Carolingians, his gestures towards the Byzantines, and his failure to stop the Saracen raids. Without the protection of powerful magnates or the Carolingian emperor, the papacy after John VIII's reign became increasingly subject to the machinations and greedy ambition of the rival clans of the local nobility.

== See also ==
- Council of Constantinople (879)
- List of murdered popes
- Pope Joan

== Bibliography ==
- Balan, Pietro (1880). Il pontificato di Giovanni VIII (in Italian). Roma: Tip. di Roma.
- Cariello, Nicola (2002). Giovanni VIII: papa medioevale (872–882). Studi e documenti, 19 (in Italian). Roma: Edilazio. ISBN 978-88-87485-34-9.
- Chisholm, Hugh, ed. (1911). "John VIII." . Encyclopædia Britannica. Vol. 15 (11th ed.). Cambridge University Press. p. 434.
- Dvornik, Francis (1948). The Photian Schism: History and Legend. Cambridge: Cambridge University Press.
- Ostrogorsky, George (1956). History of the Byzantine State. Oxford: Basil Blackwell.
- Siecienski, Anthony Edward (2010). The Filioque: History of a Doctrinal Controversy. Oxford University Press. ISBN 978-0195372045.
- O'Malley, John W. (2009). A History of the Popes: From Peter to the Present. Government Institutes. ISBN 978-1580512299.
- Goldberg, Eric Joseph (2006). Struggle for Empire: Kingship and Conflict Under Louis the German, 817–876. Cornell University Press. ISBN 080143890X.
- Curta, Florin (2006). Southeastern Europe in the Middle Ages, 500–1250. Cambridge University Press. ISBN 0521815398.
- Kreutz, Barbara M. (1996). Before the Normans: Southern Italy in the Ninth and Tenth Centuries. University of Pennsylvania Press.

Catholic Church titles
Preceded by Adrian II	Pope; 872–882	Succeeded by Marinus I
