= Museum of Croatian Archaeological Monuments =

Archaeological museum in Split, Croatia

Coordinates: 43°30′23″N 16°26′33″E

- Muzej hrvatskih arheoloških spomenika
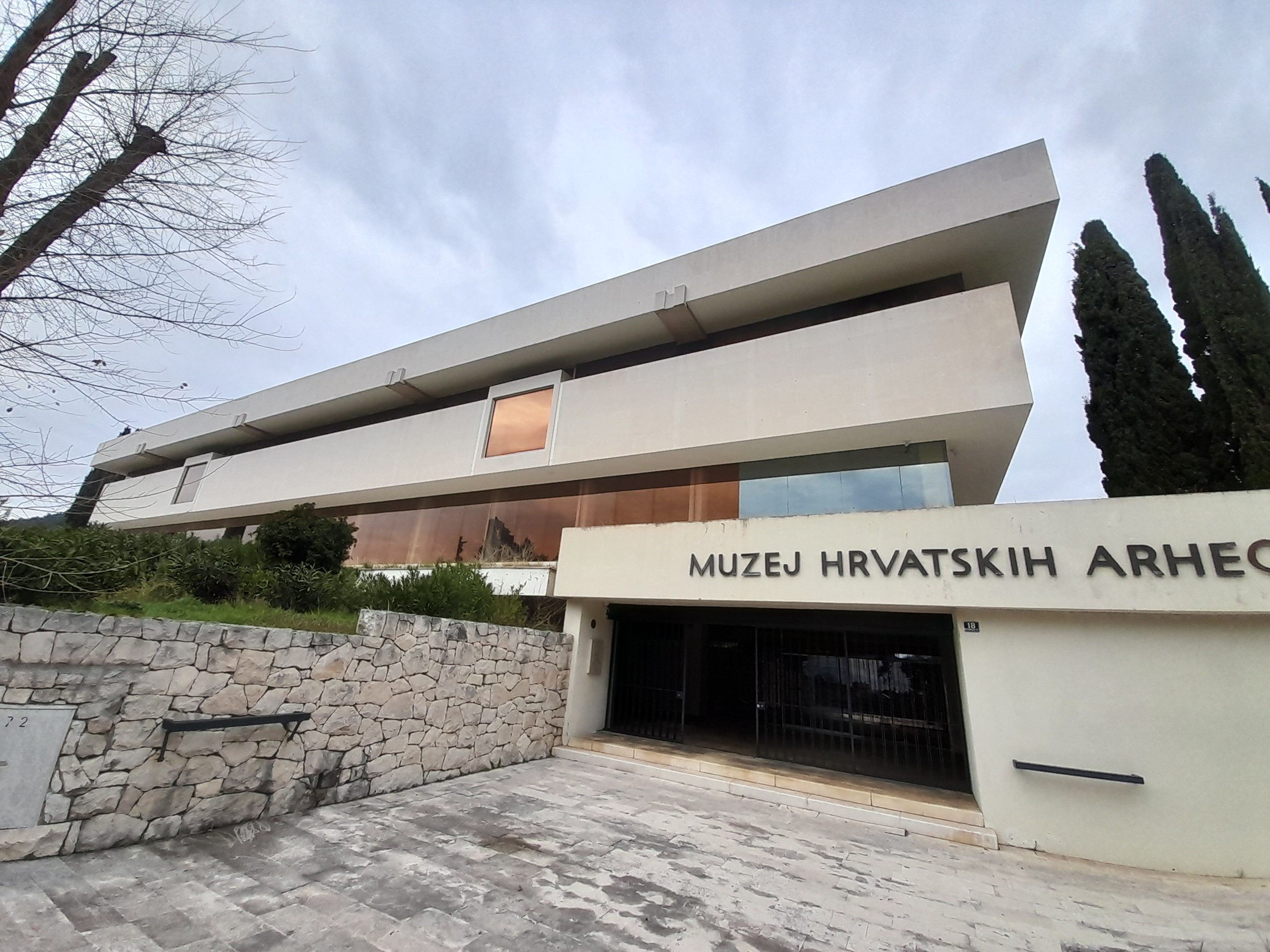
- Museum entrance
- Established: August 24, 1893; 132 years ago
- Location: Šetalište Ivana Meštrovića 18; Split, Croatia
- Type: Archaeological museum
- Collection size: 20,000
- Architect: M. Kauzlarić

The Museum of Croatian Archaeological Monuments (Croatian: Muzej hrvatskih arheoloških spomenika) located at Meštrovićevo šetalište 18, Split, Croatia, is the only museum in the country dedicated to researching and presenting cultural artifacts of the Croats in the Middle Ages, between the 7th and 15th centuries, particularly the time of the early medieval Croatian state from 9th to 12th century.

The museum was founded in Knin in 1893, and was moved first to Sinj, then Klis and finally to Split where today the collection is displayed in a purpose-built museum complex, opened in 1976.

The holdings consist mainly of jewellery, weapons and items of daily use, and include many stone artifacts that once belonged to the old Croatian church interiors. The collection of early medieval wicker, clay figurines, and old Croatian Latin epigraphic monuments is the largest collection of its kind in Europe.

== Gallery ==
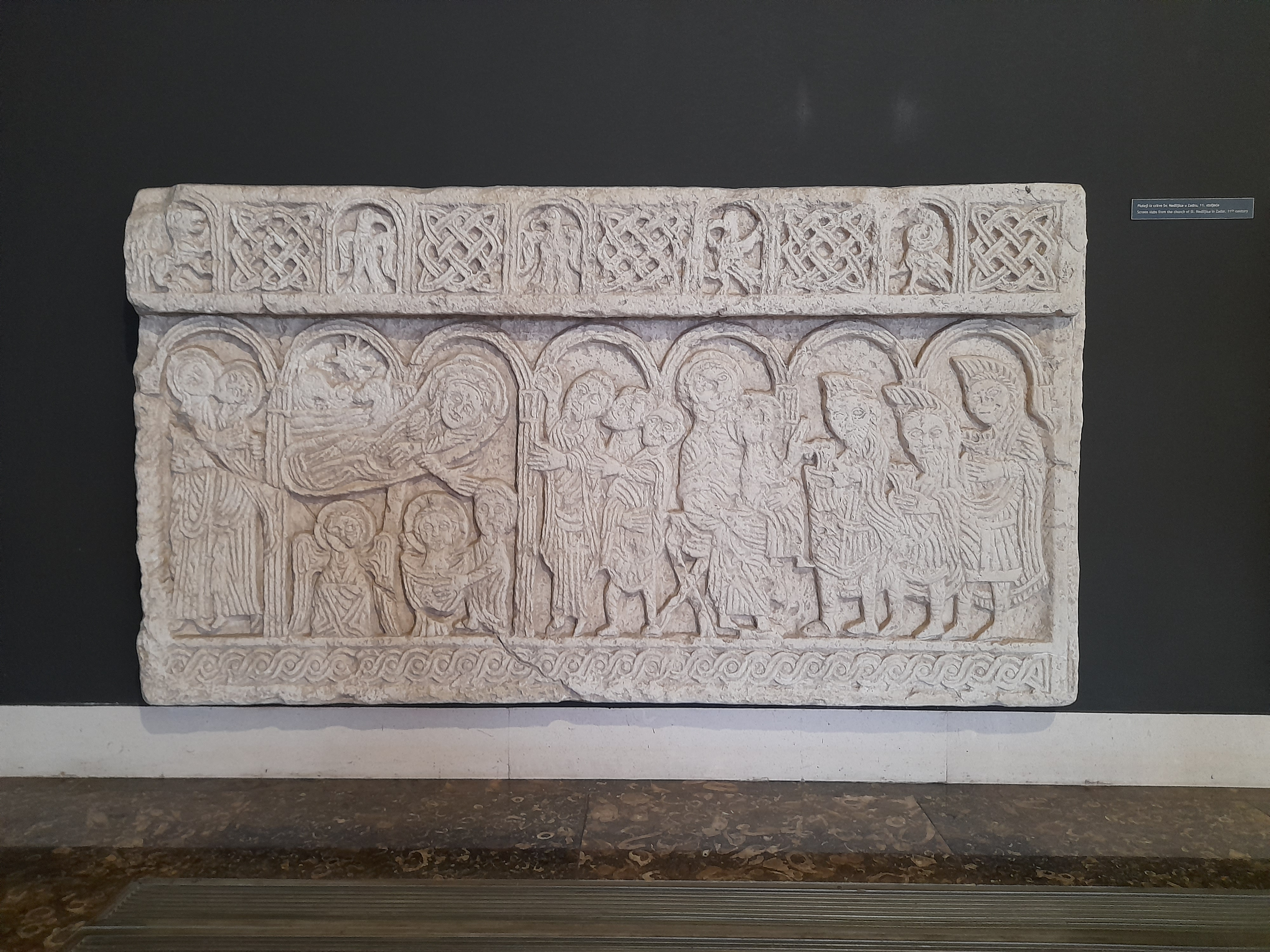
Relief from the altar screen of the church of St. Nedjeljica in Zadar

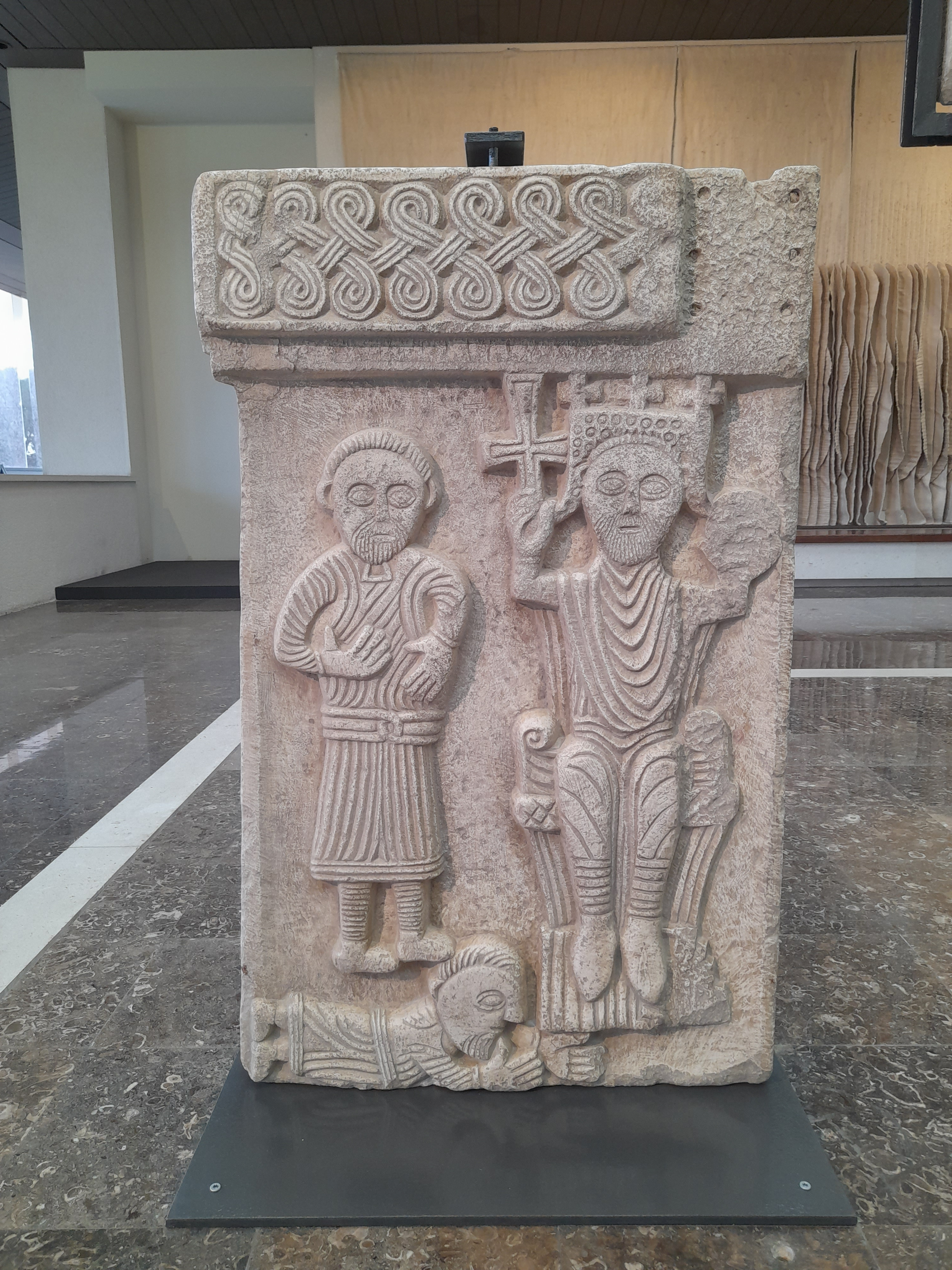
Pluteus with the figure of king from 11th century, found in Hollow Church in Solin is thought to most likely depict a King of Croatia, probably Petar Krešimir IV or Demetrius Zvonimir.

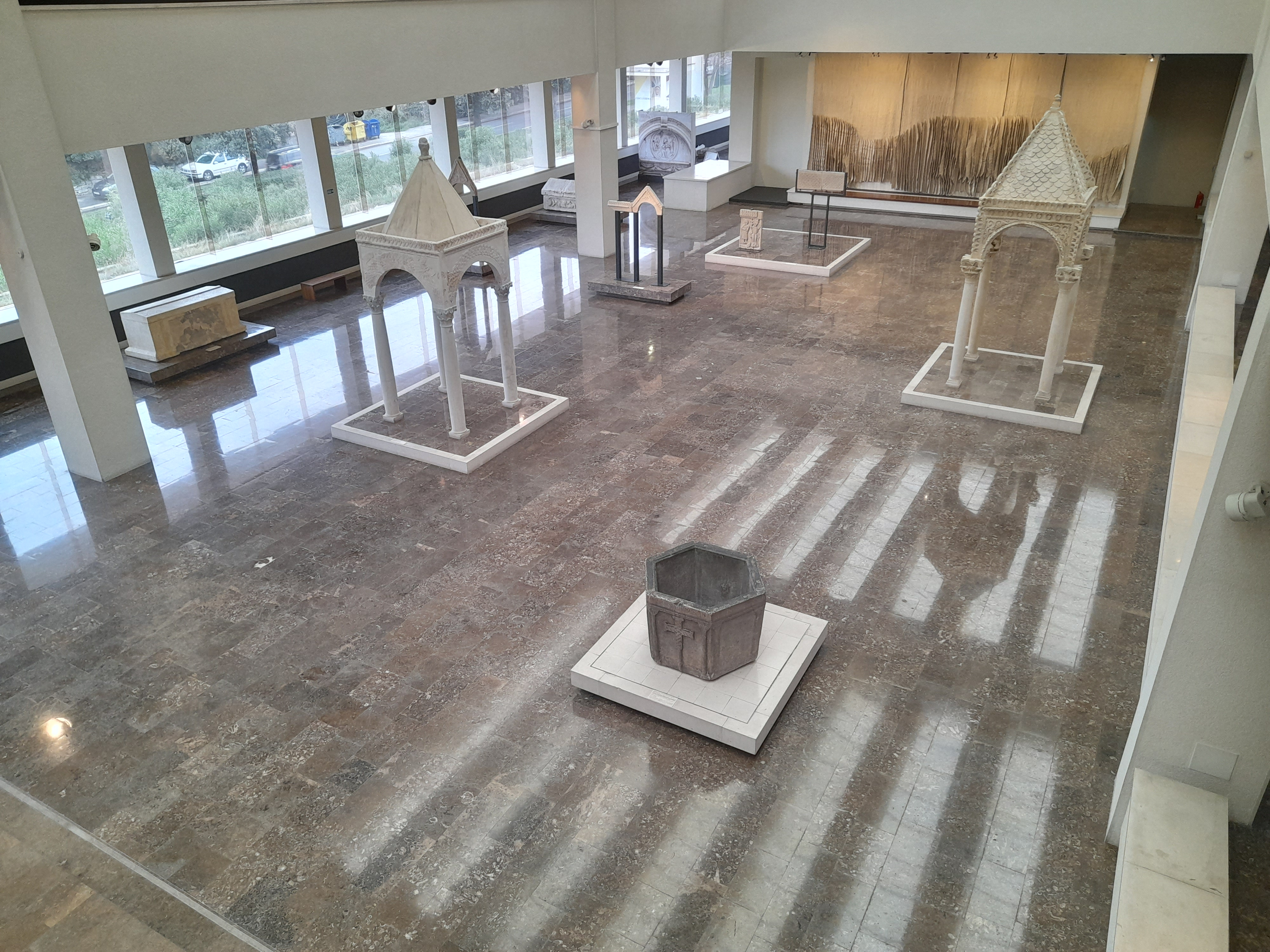
Interior

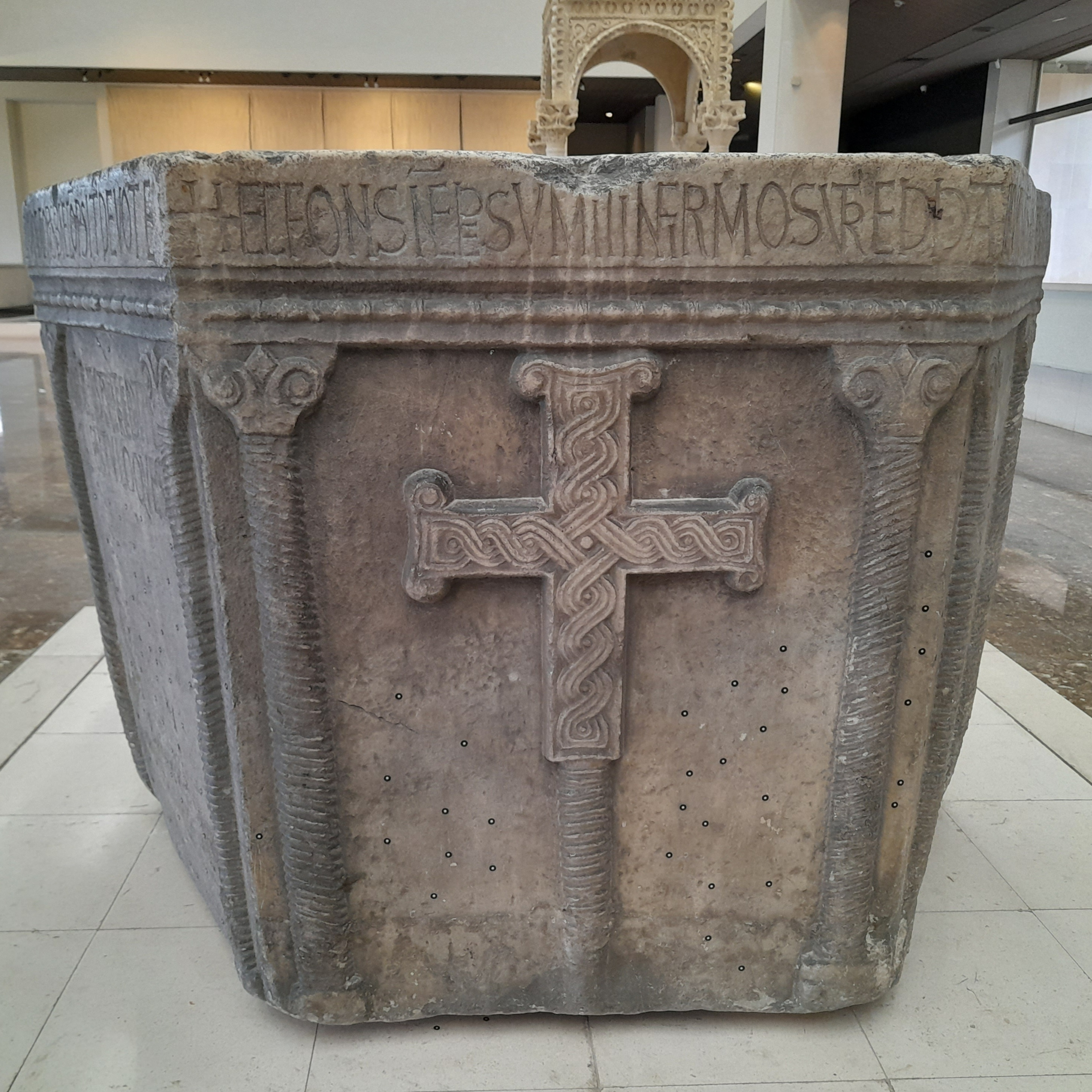
Baptismal font of Prince Višeslav (Višeslavova krstionica)

== See also ==
- List of museums in Croatia
