= Gospel of Cividale =

- Codex aquileiensis
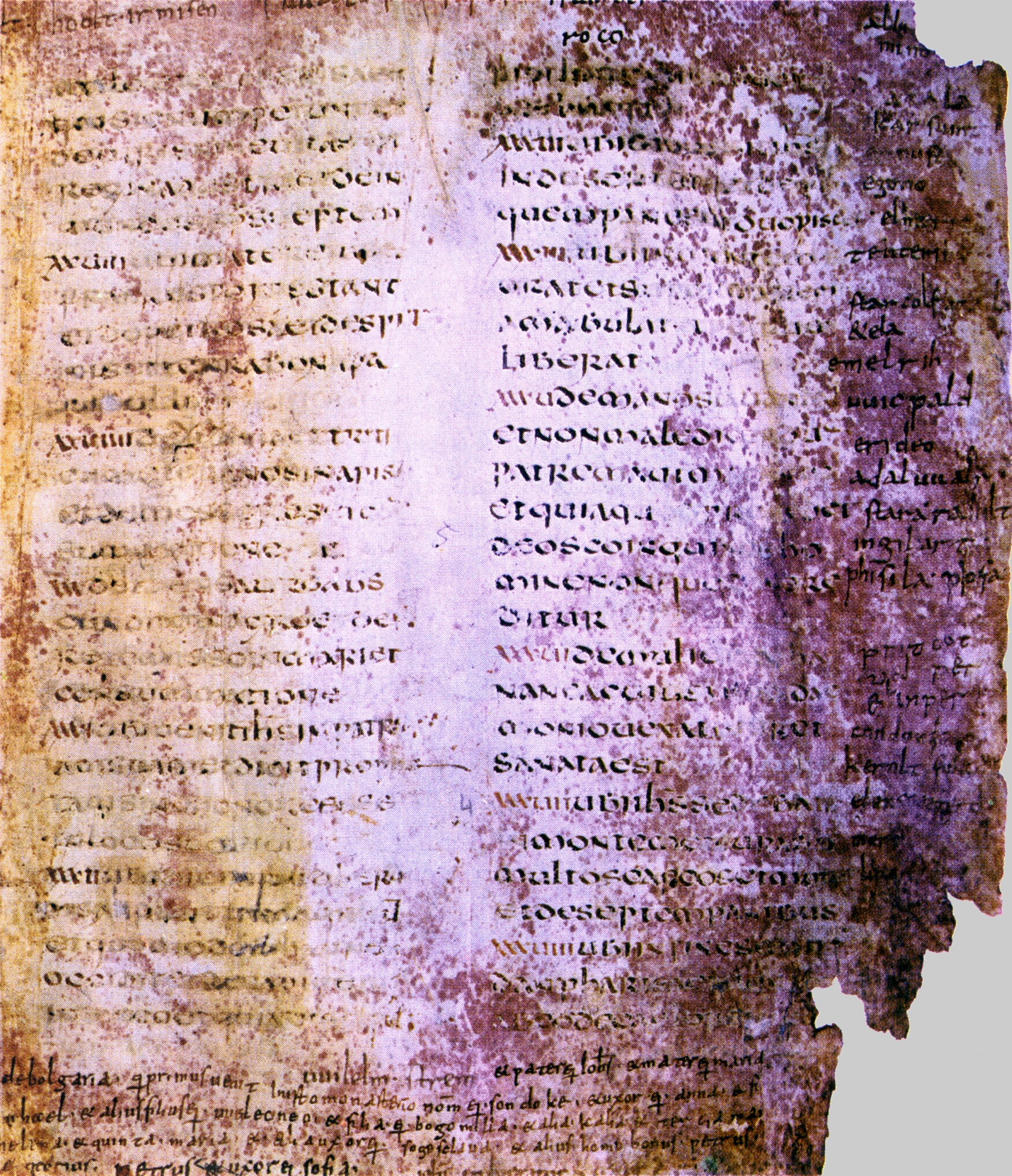
- Language: Latin
- Genre: Ethnic history

The Gospel of Cividale (Italian: Evangelario di Cividale, Slovene: čedadski evangelij, čedajski evangelij or štivanski evangelij, Croatian: čedadski evanđelistar), at first named the Codex of Aquileia (Latin: codex aquileiensis, codex foroiulensis, Slovene: Oglejski kodeks), is a medieval Latin transcript of the Gospels, written on parchment. It is named after Cividale del Friuli, a town in Friuli-Venezia Giulia (Northern Italy) where it is kept. It contains about 1500 Slavic and German names of pilgrims to the monastery of San Giovanni di Duino (Štivan, today part of the Duino Aurisina municipality), written in the second half of the 9th and the first half of the 10th century. The monastery was a property of the Patriarchate of Aquileia.

The Gospel contains the first known Croatian autographs in a Latin text.

== Contents ==
- XXVIII Historia Langobardorum, by Paul the Deacon

== Sources ==
- Klaus Zimmermanns; Andrea C. Theil; Christoph Ulmer (2006). Friaul und Triest : unter Markuslöwe und Doppeladler: eine Kulturlandschaft Oberitaliens (3. aktualis. Aufl. ed.). Köln: DuMont. p. 188. ISBN 978-3-7701-6613-8.
- Oto Luthar, ed. (2008). The land between: a history of Slovenia. Frankfurt am Main: Peter Lang. p. 103. ISBN 978-3-631-57011-1.
- Eggers, Martin (1996). Das Erzbistum des Method: Lage, Wirkung und Nachleben der kyrillomethodianischen Mission. Verlag Otto Sagner. ISBN 978-3-87690-649-2.
