= Braničevci =

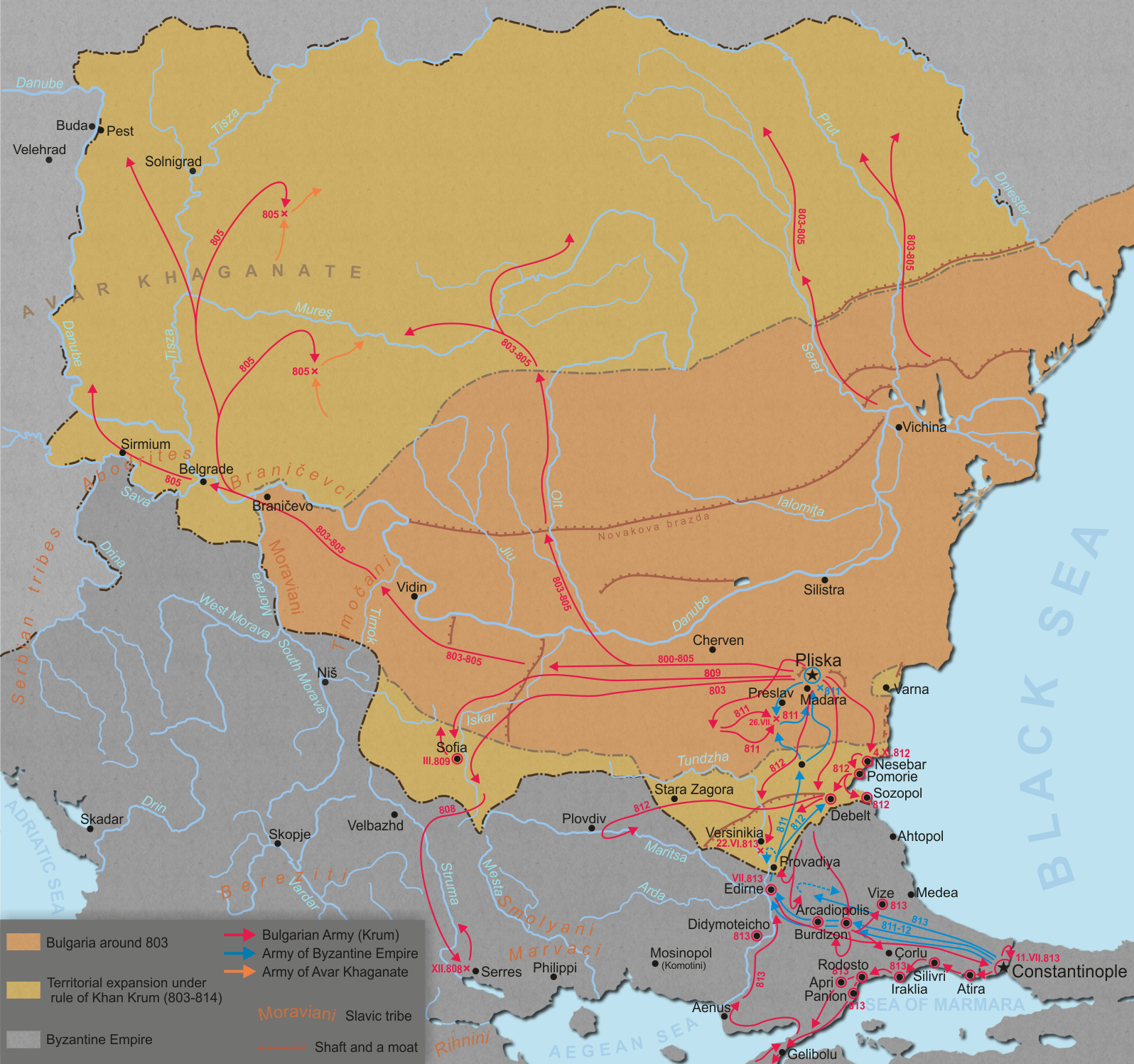
The location of the Braničevci during the reign of Khan Krum of the First Bulgarian Empire.

The Braničevci (also Branichevci or Branichevtsi Serbian Cyrillic: Браничевци) were a medieval Slavic tribe that inhabited the region of Braničevo, in what is today Serbia, during the Middle Ages.

Initially subjects of the Pannonian Avars, the Braničevci came under Bulgarian control in the late 7th century with the arrival of the Bulgars. However, for a good period of time between the mid-8th and early 9th century, local Slavs lived in a state of anarchy that lasted until around 805, when the area was conquered by Khan Krum of the First Bulgarian Empire, who defeated the remnants of the Avar Khaganate. The annexed territories became a frontier of the Frankish Empire, which exerted control in Lower Pannonia.

In 818, during the rule of Omurtag (814-836), the Braničevci, together with the Timočani and Abodrites of the Northwestern Bulgarian frontier, revolted against centralizing administrative reforms begun by Krum and furthered by Omurtag. These reforms deprived the tribes of much of their local authority and increased tribute and levy obligations, which incited the tribes to further seek protection from Louis the Pious. The area where they lived was disputed between the Franks and Bulgars, as Omurtag sent embassies in 824 and 826 seeking to settle the border dispute, but was neglected. The area was eventually reconquered by the Bulgars in 827, when Omurtag advanced militarily and imposed new local Bulgarian chieftains, meeting little resistance.

Some researchers connect the Braničevci to the Praedenecenti mentioned in the Royal Frankish Annals in 822–824. The Arab geographer al-Masʿūdī possibly mention the tribe as the Barānījābīn in a list of Slavic tribes after the Moravians (Murāwa), Croats (Kharwātīn), Saxons or Czechs (Sāsīn) and Kashubians or Guduscani (Khashānīn).
