= Bijaći =

Medieval village in Croatia

Coordinates: 43.5408°N 16.2872°E

- Interactive map of Bijaći

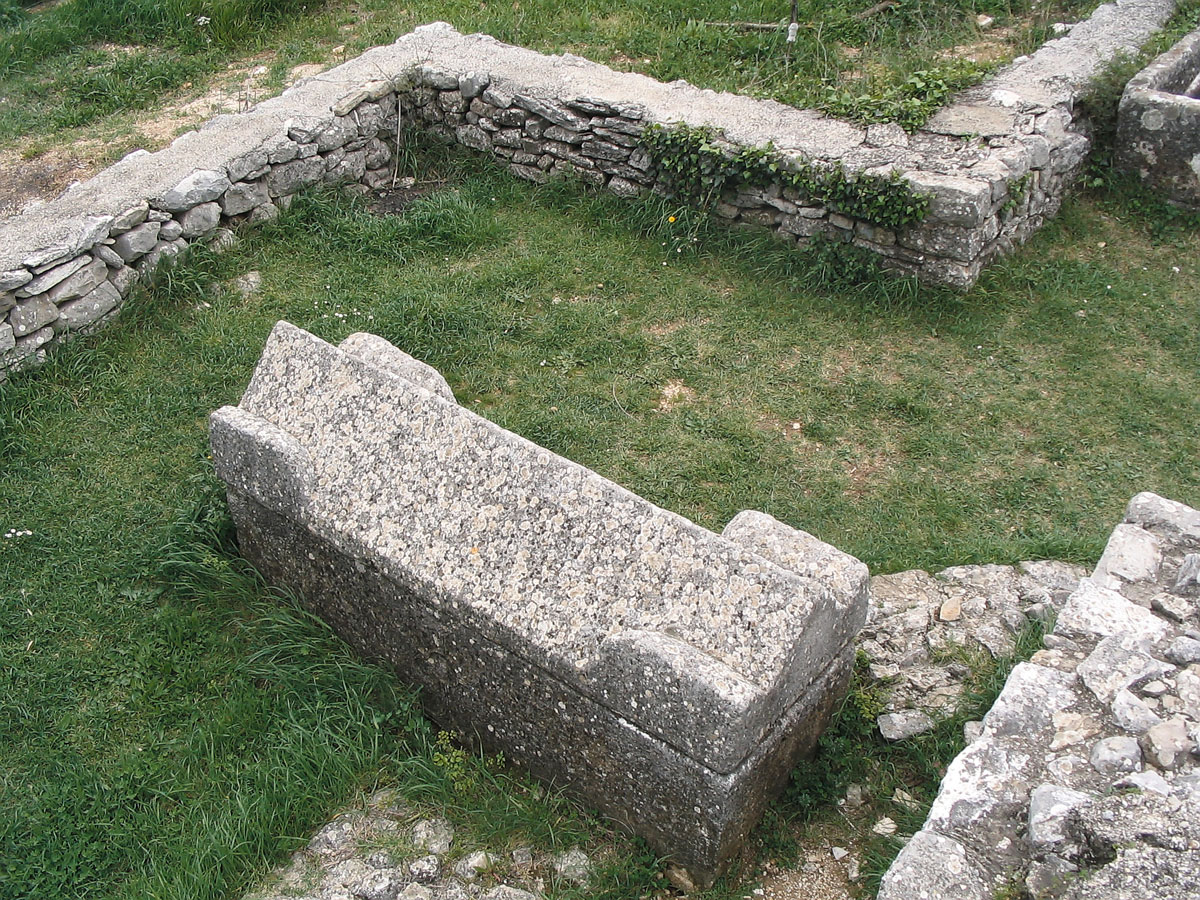
Excavated 9th century sarcophagus

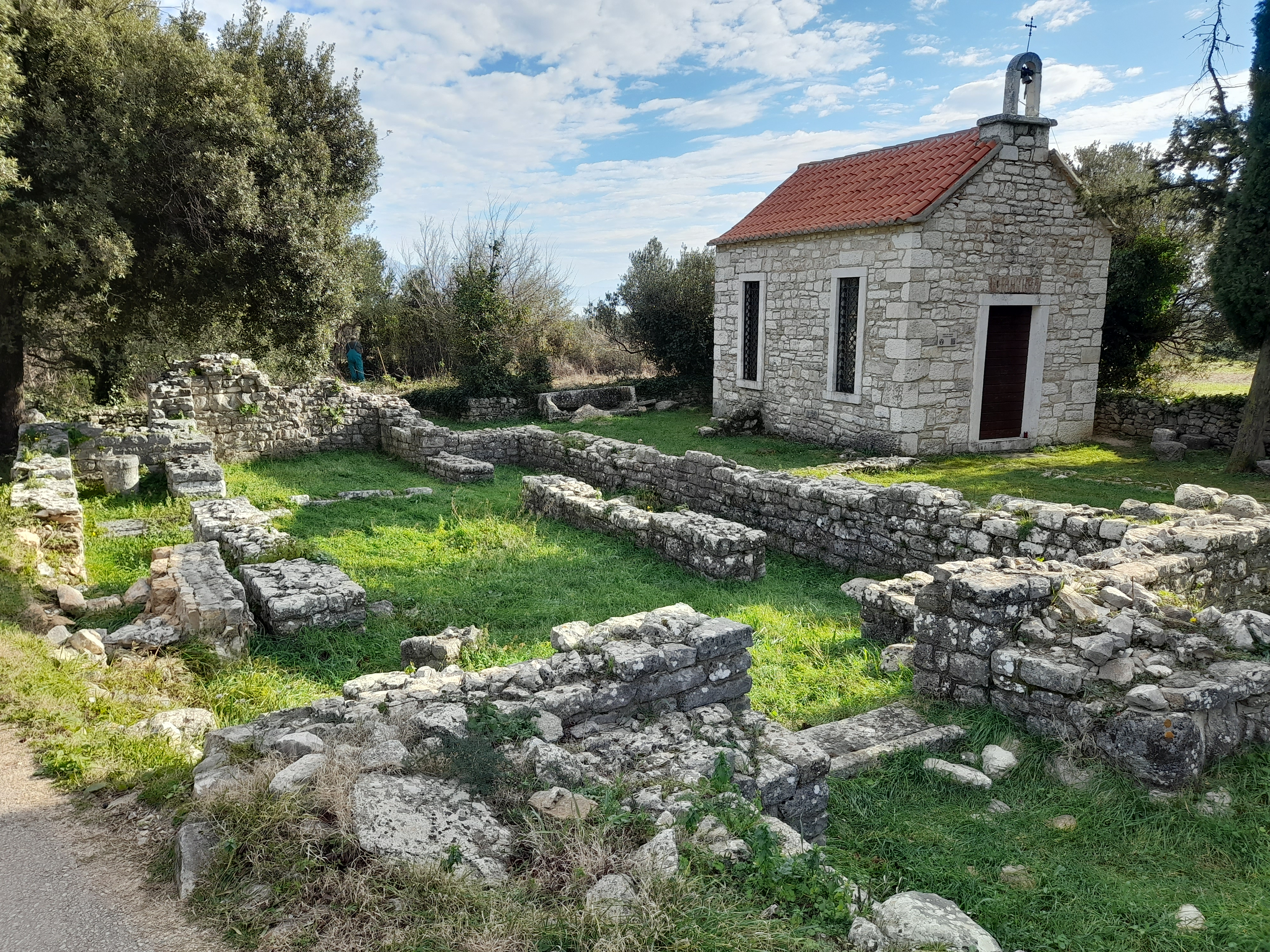
Excavations and the new, smaller church of St. Martha

Bijaći was a medieval Croatian village, some 5 kilometres (3.1 mi) northeast of Trogir. The village developed around the church of St. Martha on the site of a former 1st century villa rustica at Stombrate locality, about half way between Tragurium and Salona, in the hinterland of the Roman veterans' coastal settlement of Siculi. Renovated in late antiquity, part of the villa became an early Christian church, which evolved between the 5th and 7th centuries.

Following the arrival of the Croats, it is believed that the complex of the villa was transformed into the center of a Croatian ducal estate, which stretched to the coast, incorporating the Divulje area and the church of St. Vital. During this period, the early church was repaired and rededicated to St. Martha; arguably, the church was a court church of the early Croatian dukes.

The earliest mentions of Bijaći date back to 852 (Byaci) in the grant of duke Trpimir, and 892 (Biaci) to the duke Muncimir's document confirming the Trpimir's grant, each known from later copies. An inscription on a stone ciborium from the early 9th century that was during Duke Mislav's reign placed within a baptistery, as well as the mention of priest Gumpertus, provides evidence of a Frankish missionary post in the Croatian ducal estate. This signifies the final stage of the christianization of Croats within their new Adriatic settlements, a process supported by the papal authority of Rome and the Carolingian Empire under Charlemagne.

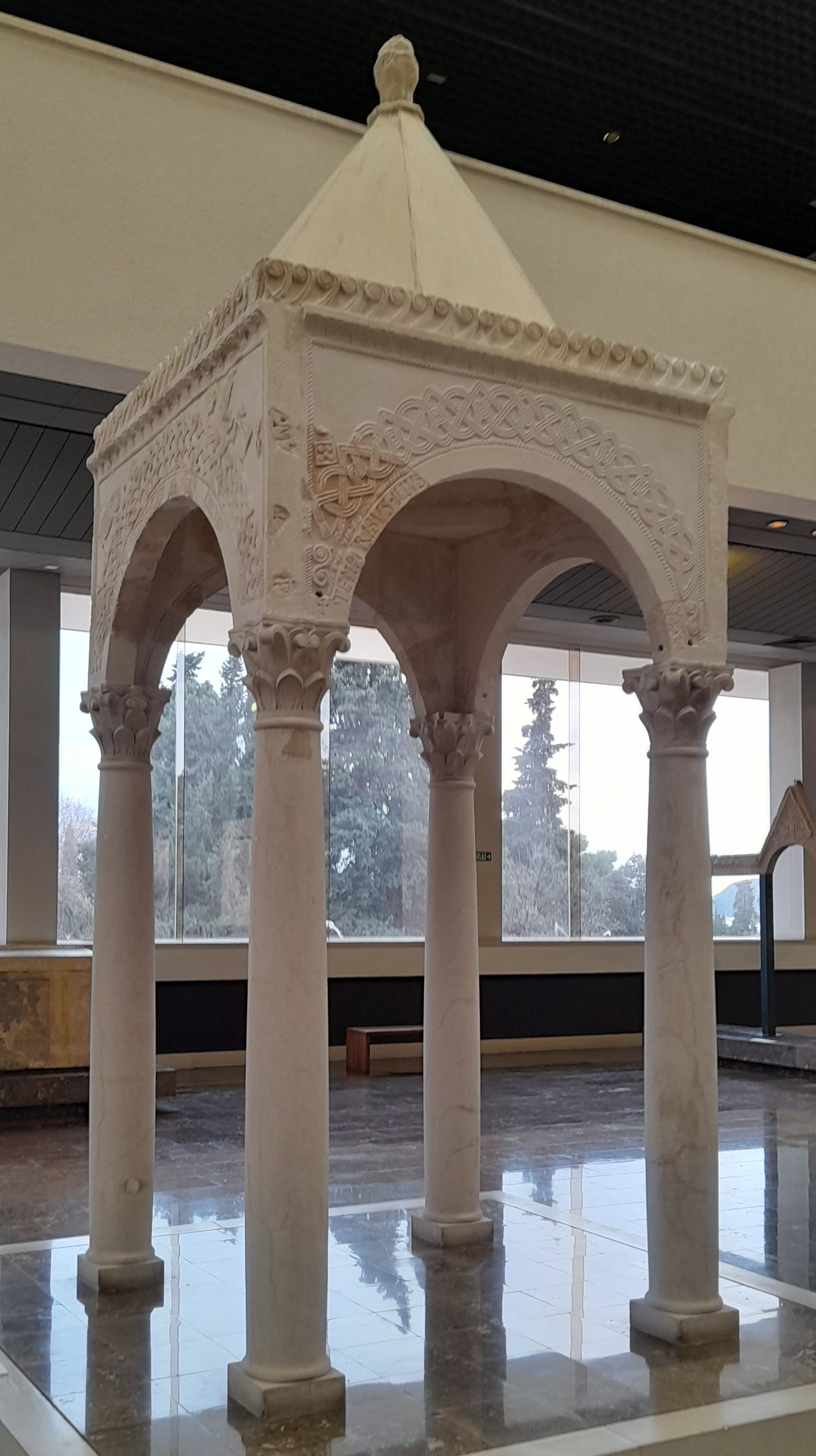
The reconstructed quadrilateral ciborium from Bijaći

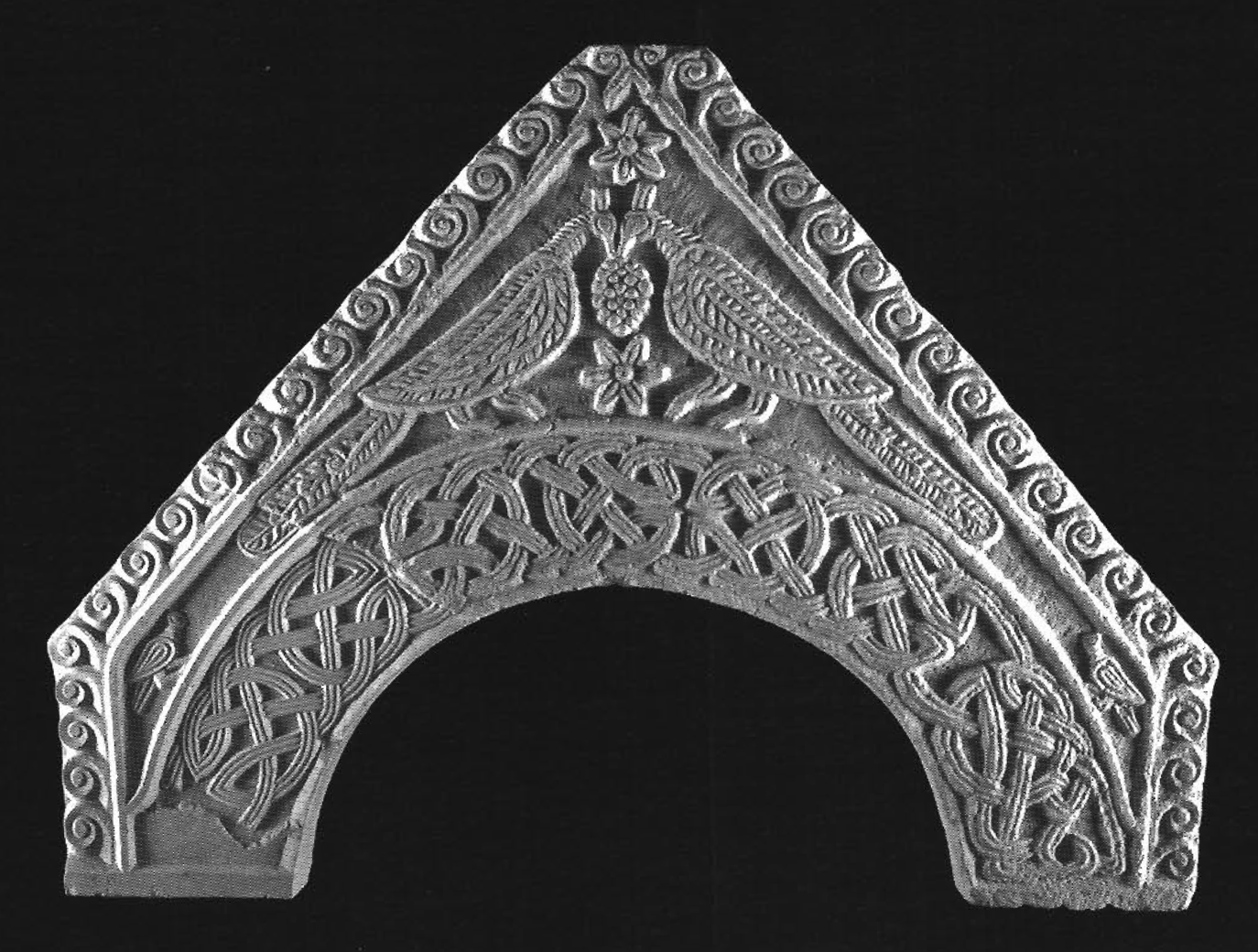
Gables from the old church of St. Martha

Built on the remains of an early Christian three-nave basilica, the early Croatian church of St. Martha was a three-nave structure with an angular apse and a Romanesque bell tower that was added in 1197. The church measures 14.8×8 m. Close to the ruins, the remains the a late antiquity early Christian cemetery with 15 graves were discovered in the 1902–1905 excavations, as well as 13 early medieval Croatian graves, mostly from the 10th and 11th centuries. In an early Christian sarcophagus dated to the 9th century a pair of earrings and an iron knife were found. Around the complex, walls that enclosed it are still visible. Numerous fragments of Croatian interlace from the 9th and the 10th centuries have been found, including a late 8th-century inscription mentioning a Croatian nobleman (župan) and a Croatian ruler. This inscription is the oldest known reference to the Croatian name after their migration. The reconstructed quadrilateral ciborium that was found in pieces is now kept at the Museum of Croatian Archaeological Monuments in Split. Six stone lintels have also been found in the vicinity of the church; they may have belonged to the buildings of the ducal palace.

The medieval church was damaged in Ottoman raids, and a smaller church was built on top of its baptistery in the 17th century. Because of some incorporated spolia, the church was demolished during the early 20th century excavations and rebuilt in another place.
