= Borna (duke) =

- Duke of Croatia
- Reign: c. 810–821
- Predecessor: Višeslav?
- Successor: Vladislav
- Died: between January and October 821
- Religion: Christianity

Borna was the duke of Croatia (Dalmatia and Liburnia) from c. 810 to 821 and vassal of the Frankish Empire. He is mentioned in the Royal Frankish Annals (Annales regni Francorum) in entries regarding 818–821. His titles were "Duke of the Guduscani" (a tribe from Lika and northern Dalmatia) in 818; "Duke of Dalmatia" in 819; "Duke of Dalmatia and Liburnia" in 821. Historiography treats him as a ruler of Duchy of Croatia.

== Etymology ==
In the name of Borna scholars have seen similarity with the name of Saxons count Bernus (father of Gottschalk of Orbais), and Burgundian names Bornus, Borno and Bornonus. Petar Skok, besides supporting possibility of being a Frankish name (borns meaning "son"), also proposed Slavic etymology from Proto-Slavic *born- which with liquid metathesis could be related to Slavic personal names Branimir, Branislav and others.

== History ==
Map showing imperial boundaries in 814, with Croatia as tributary to Charlemagne.

Borna is documented in the "Royal Frankish Annals" (Annales regni Francorum). He is first mentioned regarding an 818 meeting at Herstal of Frankish Emperor Louis the Pious with envoys of the Obotrites, Borna (duke of the Guduscani), and of the Timociani, who had recently revolted against the Bulgars and switched sides to the Franks, and also Ljudevit, duke of the Slavs in Lower Pannonia, the commander of the March of Friuli. Historiography predominantly treats the Guduscani as a tribe in Lika, along the river Gacka.

In July 819, another Frankish assembly was held at Ingelheim, and because of Ljudevit's rebellion against the Franks, Frankish troops were sent from Italy to Pannonia, but returned without accomplishment. Ljudevit sent envoys to the Franks with conditions that were not accepted by the Frankish emperor; Ljudevit continued the rebellion and sent envoys to neighbouring tribes to join him, managing to win over the Timociani who had initially submitted to the Franks. A small Frankish army clashed with Ljudevit's army in Carinthia, destroyed much of it and drove it out. Borna, now the "Duke of Dalmatia", with a large army met Ljudevit's advancing army on the Kupa river. The Guduscani deserted Borna at the first encounter, but he fled safely with his bodyguard. During this battle, Dragomuž (Dragomosus), Ljudevit's father-in-law who had joined Borna with the outbreak of the rebellion, fell. Borna conquered the Guduscani again after they had returned home. In December, Ljudevit used the opportunity to attack Dalmatia with a large army, ravaging the country. Borna attacked Ljudevit with crack troops, after storing as much as he could in his castles, seeing that he was no match for him. Worn down, attacked in the rear and flank, with heavy losses, Ljudevit was forced to retreat from Borna's territory. Ljudevit had 3,000 lost soldiers, and Borna seized more than 300 horses, and spoils of all kinds, then informed the Frankish emperor through his envoys of this.

In January 820 another Frankish assembly was held in Aachen. It was decided that Ljudevit's rebellion be quelled with three armies from three directions. Borna offered his opinions on the operation, first through envoys and then in person. In springtime, the three armies were dispatched, the first from Italy through the Noric Alps, the second through Carinthia, the third from Bavaria through Upper Pannonia. The first and third moved slowly, one hindered by enemies and the other by the long route, while the second crossed the Drava, successfully overcoming three enemy encounters, moving fast. The armies united and ravaged the land, and returned home without significant losses, while Ljudevit had stayed safe in a mountainous castle. Carniola, on the border with Friuli, and the Carinthians that had defected from the Franks to Ljudevit, surrendered to the Franks.

In February 821 another Frankish assembly was held in Aachen. War against Ljudevit was planned, with three armies to ravage lands of traitors. Meanwhile, Borna, now mentioned as the "Duke of Dalmatia and Liburnia", died, and was succeeded by his nephew (by his sister), Vladislav, by the people's will and emperor's approval. Ljudevit's lands were ravaged, the armies returning home by October.

== Historiography ==
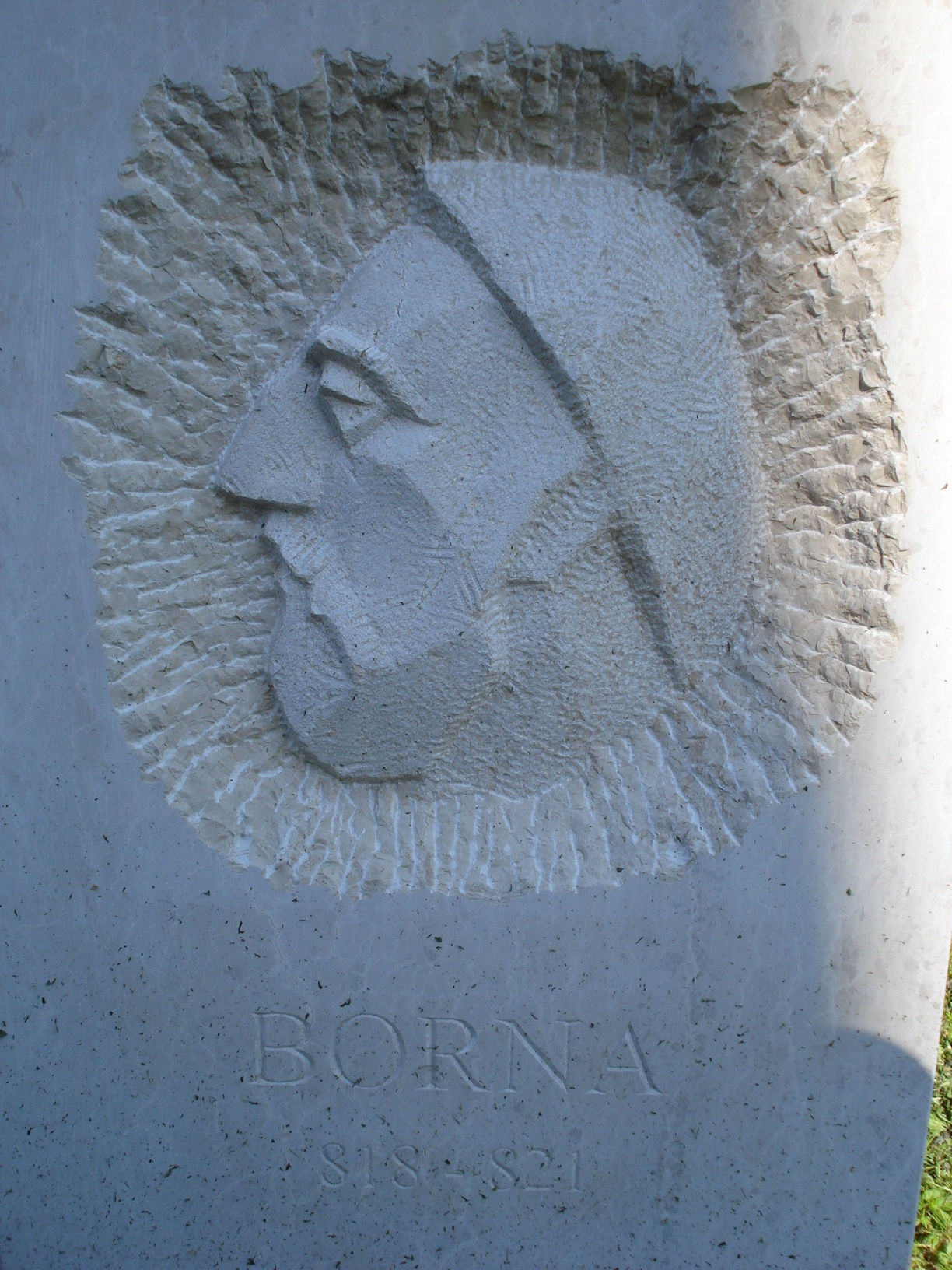
Monument to Borna in Otočac

There are differing views over Borna's tribal belonging and regnal title in historiography. Croatian historiography treats him as a ruler of "Dalmatian Croatia": V. Klaić (1886) called him a "White Croatian duke" that later became the "Duke of Dalmatian Croats". F. Šišić (1920) deemed him a "Dalmatian-Croatian duke". A. P. Vlasto (1970) called him a "Dalmatian Croat" ruler, and believed he was at least nominally Christian. T. Macan (1971) called him a "duke of the southern Croatian duchy". I. Perić (1997) called him a "Croatian-Dalmatian duke". Similarly, Croatian historian Neven Budak also mentions him as "first known Croatian duke". Older Croatian historiography has claimed Borna's predecessor was Višeslav, possibly his father.

R. Novaković (1973) does not support that he was a duke of Dalmatian Croatia, as no contemporary sources name him as such. According to him, Borna could only be the duke of that area that was at the time under Frankish supreme rule, and that he was active only in the area included in the rebellion against Frankish rule, that is, only west of the Una river. It is possible that Borna was the duke of an archonty not yet part of Croatia in the beginning of the 9th century, neither was Croatia at all included in the events of Ljudevit's rebellion. The war was fought only in the area under Frankish rule, while Dalmatian Croatia was outside those events, as it at that time was under Byzantine supreme rule.

Fine Jr. first (1983, 1991) called him a ruler of "Dalmatian Croatia", in c. 810–821, having succeeded Višeslav and "who resided at Nin and seems to have been the ruler of most of the Croatians in northern Dalmatia, was also a Frankish Vassal." then (2010) called him simply a Slavic prince, and also noted that the Franks did not use the term "Croats", suggesting that those usually called Croats in scholarship did not actually use that name. B. W. Scholz (1970) uses the original titles found in the primary source, and in the index uses "duke of Dalmatia". R. McKitterick (1983) called him a "leader of the Dalmatian Croats". C. R. Bowlus (1995) treated him as the "dux of the Guduscani and Timocian Slavs" and a "Dalmatian prince". F. Curta (2006) treats him as a Slavic ruler, of the Guduscani, a Slavic tribe in the Gacka region (modern Croatia). Garipzanov, Geary and Urbańczyk (2008) call him "Duke of Dalmatia and Liburnia".

=== Identification with other rulers ===
Marquart, in Osteuropäische u. ostasiatische Streifzöge (1903), identified De Administrando Imperio's Porinos and Porga with Borna. Krumbacher (1906) supported that Porinos and Borna were the same, but not Porga. The identification of Borna with Porin, and Porga, in Croatian historiography was advanced by historians who argued Frankish baptism of the Croats in the 9th century. However, as noted by Tibor Živković, "it is not so difficult to refute this theory, or rather hypothesis", as on the mere basis of the chronology of arrival and baptism in the 7th century, as well the non-Slavic origin of personal names of early Croatian rulers in the 7th century, Porga and Porin were the same person who could not be Borna or Branimir (r. 879–892), with whom some scholars tried to identify as well.

Recently, Bernard Boller (2004), proposed hypothesis that Borna actually was Gottschalk's father Bernus, which could possibly explain "Gottschalk's interest in the region, where he may have had relatives". However, considering that is known name of Borna's uncle (Ljudemisl) and nephew (Vladislav), that there's lack of evidence that the Franks sent a Saxon count, and historical sources do not mention significant information such as Gottschalk being Borna's son or that Gottschalk's father was a duke, the hypothesis can be easily rejected.

== Titles ==
In the Royal Frankish Annals Borna is named "Duke of the Guduscani" (Latin: ducis Guduscanorum) in 818. In 819 he is the "Duke of Dalmatia" (Latin: dux Dalmatiae), while in 821 he is the "Duke of Dalmatia and Liburnia" (Latin: dux Dalmatiae atque Liburniae). The gradual ascent of his title should be due to his growing importance during the Frankish conflict with Ljudevit.

== Sources ==
- Moravcsik, Gyula, ed. (1967) [1949]. Constantine Porphyrogenitus: De Administrando Imperio (2nd revised ed.). Washington D.C.: Dumbarton Oaks Center for Byzantine Studies. ISBN 9780884020219.
- Scholz, Bernhard Walter, ed. (1970). Carolingian Chronicles: Royal Frankish Annals and Nithard's Histories. University of Michigan Press. ISBN 0472061860.
- Fine, John Van Antwerp Jr. (1991) [1983]. The Early Medieval Balkans: A Critical Survey from the Sixth to the Late Twelfth Century. Ann Arbor, Michigan: University of Michigan Press. ISBN 0472081497.
- Fine, John Van Antwerp Jr. (2005). When Ethnicity Did Not Matter in the Balkans: A Study of Identity in Pre-Nationalist Croatia, Dalmatia, and Slavonia in the Medieval and Early-Modern Periods. Ann Arbor, Michigan: University of Michigan Press. ISBN 0472025600.
- Katičić, Radoslav (1998). Litterarum studia: književnost i naobrazba ranoga hrvatskog srednjovjekovlja. Matica hrvatska. pp. 184, 209, 320. ISBN 978-953-150-177-4.
- Klaić, Nada (1990). Povijest Hrvata u srednjem vijeku (in Croatian). Zagreb: Globus. ISBN 9788634304725.
- Novaković, Relja (1973). "Tragom starih povelja i drugih izvora". Историјски часопис (in Serbian) (20). Istorijski institut: 9–14. GGKEY:PC0Y08JZTZC.
- Živković, Tibor (2012). De conversione Croatorum et Serborum: A Lost Source. Belgrade: The Institute of History.
- Živković, Tibor (2011). "The Origin of the Royal Frankish Annalist's Information about the Serbs in Dalmatia". Homage to Academician Sima Ćirković. Belgrade: The Institute for History. pp. 381–398. ISBN 9788677430917.

| Preceded by Višeslav of Croatia | Duke of Croatia c. 810 – 821 | Succeeded by Vladislav of Croatia |
| First Oldest and only known | Duke of the Guduscani; 818 | Elevation |
| Elevation | Duke of Dalmatia; 819 | Elevation |
| Elevation | Duke of Dalmatia and Liburnia; 821 | Succeeded by Vladislav |
