= Battle of Kupa =

Date	819
Location	Near the Kupa river, March of Pannonia (in modern Slovenia or Croatia)
Result	Ljudevit victory

Belligerents
Ljudevit	Borna

Strength
Unknown	Unknown

The Battle of Kupa occurred at Kupa river in 819. It involved Frankish vassal Duke Borna of Littoral Croatia, with an army of Guduscani, against the advancing army of Frankish rebel, Duke Ljudevit of Pannonian Croatia. During the battle, the Guduscans abandoned Borna and joined Ljudevit. While Borna's forces suffered massive losses, he managed to escape with his bodyguards. However, Dragomuž, Ljudevit's father-in-law, who sided with Borna, was killed. Ljudevit suffered heavy casualties that included 3,000 soldiers and over 300 horses. Afterwards, Ljudevit used the momentum to invade Littoral Croatia in December 819.

== Sources ==
- Horvat, Rudolf (1924). "15. Ljudevit Posavski". Povijest Hrvatske I. (od najstarijeg doba do g. 1657.) (in Croatian).
