= Duchy of Croatia =

European state, 7/8th century to c. 925

Duchy of Croatia Kneževina Hrvatska (Croatian) Ducatus Chroatorum (Latin)
- 7th/8th century–c. 925^{a}
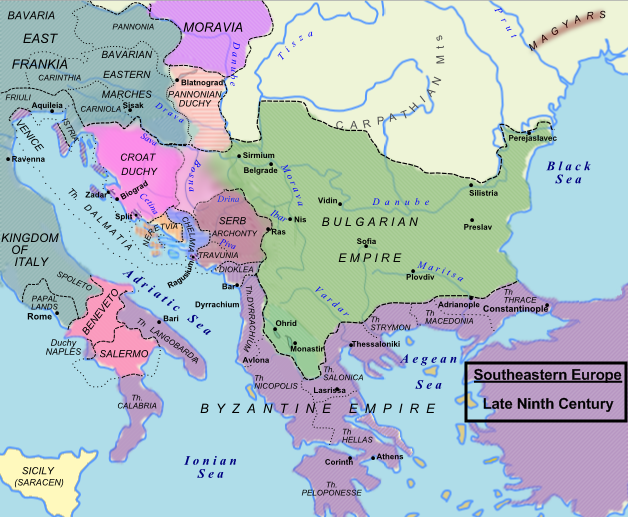
- Southeast Europe c. 850; Duchy of Croatia is shaded pink.
- Capital: No permanent seat Nin Biograd; Klis; Bijaći; Solin; Knin
- Common languages: Old Croatian; Latin
- Religion: Slavic paganism; Chalcedonian Christianity
- Demonym: Croats
- Government: Duchy
- Duke
  - early 7th century: "Father of Porga" and Porga (first archons)
  - 810–821: Borna (first known duke)
  - 910–925: Tomislav (last duke)
- Historical era: Middle Ages
  - Established: 7th/8th century
  - Frankish vassalage: 790s
  - Papal recognition: 7 June 879
  - Elevated to the status of kingdom: c. 925^{a}
Preceded by	Succeeded by
Byzantine Empire; Avar Khaganate	Kingdom of Croatia
- Today part of: Croatia; Bosnia and Herzegovina
- 1. Tomislav is regarded as the first king due to being addressed as Rex (King) in a letter sent by Pope John X and the Councils of Split in 925 AD. Circumstances and the date of his coronation are unknown.

The Duchy of Croatia (Modern Croatian: Kneževina Hrvatska; also Duchy of the Croats, Modern Croatian: Kneževina Hrvata; Latin: Ducatus Chroatorum; Greek: Χρωβατία) was a medieval state that was established by White Croats who migrated into the area of the former Roman province of Dalmatia c. 7th century AD. Throughout its existence the Duchy had several seats – namely, Klis, Solin, Knin, Bijaći and Nin. It comprised the littoral – the coastal part of today's Croatia – except Istria, and included a large part of the mountainous hinterland as well.

The Croats settled in Dalmatia after defeating the Pannonian Avars, during the time of Byzantine emperor Heraclius I. The Duchy was in the center of competition between the Byzantine Empire and the Carolingian Empire for rule over the area. Croatian rivalry with Venice emerged in the first decades of the 9th century and would continue through the following centuries. Croatia also waged battles with the Bulgarian Empire (founded c. 681; Bulgar-Croatian relations improved greatly afterwards) and with the Arabs; it also sought to extend its control over important coastal city-states under the rule of Byzantium. Croatia experienced periods of vassalage to the Franks or to the Byzantines and of de facto independence until 879, when Duke Branimir was recognized as an independent ruler by Pope John VIII. The Duchy was ruled by the Trpimirović and Domagojević dynasties from 845 to 1091. Around 925, during the rule of Tomislav, Croatia became a kingdom.

== Nomenclature ==
"Dalmatian Croatia" (Dalmatinska Hrvatska) and "Littoral Croatia" (Primorska Hrvatska) are modern appellations amongst historians for the Duchy. The state is sometimes called a principality, i.e. the "Principality of Croatia". The first recorded name for the Duchy was "Land of the Croats" (Latin: regnum Croatorum) in 852. Croatia was not yet a kingdom at the time and the term regnum is used in terms of a country in general. In Byzantine sources the entity was usually called just "Croatia" (Greek: Χρωβατία).

The first known duke, Borna, was named "Duke of Dalmatia" (Latin: Dux Dalmatiae) and later "Duke of Dalmatia and Liburnia" (Latin: Dux Dalmatiae atque Liburniae) in the Annales regni Francorum. The Croatian name is recorded in contemporary charters of Croatian dukes from the second half of the 9th century. Trpimir I was named "Duke of the Croats" (Latin: Dux Chroatorum) in a Latin charter issued in 852, while Branimir was defined as "Duke of the Croats" (Latin: Dux Cruatorvm) on a preserved inscription from Šopot near Benkovac.

== Geography ==
Within the area of the Roman province of Dalmatia, various tribal groupings, which were called sclaviniae by the Byzantines, were settled along the Adriatic coast. Croatia in the early Middle Ages was an area bounded by the Eastern Adriatic hinterland on one side, then extended to a part of western Herzegovina, western and central Bosnia, then into Lika, Gacka and Krbava, and North-West to Vinodol and Labin in the Croatian Littoral area. Several coastal Dalmatian city-states were under the rule of the Byzantines, including Split, Zadar, Kotor and Dubrovnik, as well as islands of Hvar and Krk. To the south Croatia bordered with the land of the Narentines, which stretched from the rivers Cetina to Neretva, and had the islands of Brač, Hvar, Korčula, Mljet, Vis and Lastovo in its possession. In the southern part of Dalmatia, there was Zahumlje (Zachumlia), Travunia and Dioclea (today Montenegro). North of Croatia there was the Duchy of Lower Pannonia. Croatia, as well as other early medieval states, didn't have a permanent capital and Croatian dukes resided in various places on their courts. The first important center of Croatia was Klis near Split, where Duke Trpimir I resided. Other dukes ruled from the towns of Solin, Knin, Biaći and Nin.

== History ==
=== Background ===
The Roman provinces and native populations in Southeastern Europe, including the province of Dalmatia and other parts of the Praetorian prefecture of Illyricum, were attacked and conquered by the Huns and Goths with the latter Ostrogoths forming Ostrogothic Kingdom (493–553). The archaeological findings of fibulae and other artifacts confirm the presence of Ostrogoths and Gepids in Northern Dalmatia, and Pannonia.

Although the Byzantine Empire managed to reconquest the territory (albeit the Plague of Justinian and Late Antique Little Ice Age), since the mid-6th century followed even more devastating intrusions and migrations of the early Slavs. Most of the Roman province by the 7th century were pressured by Avar Khaganate, a nomadic confederacy led by the Pannonian Avars who subjugated surrounding Slavic tribes. In c. 614 the Avars and Slavs sacked and decisively destroyed the capital of the province of Dalmatia, Salona, and retained direct control of the region.

According to the De Administrando Imperio, the White Croats were either invited into province of Dalmatia by the Byzantine Emperor Heraclius (r. 610–641) and allowed to settle there after defeating the Avars, or prevailing the Avars after the lengthy war the Croats migrated across the Sava from Pannonia Savia and settled Dalmatia on their own. According to the same source, the Croats were led by five brothers (Kloukas, Lobelos, Kosentzis, Mouchlo, Chrobatos) and two sister (Touga, Bouga), their first archon during the Avar wars and settlement was unnamed father of Porga, and first Christianization happened during the rule of Porga himself (both contemporaries of Heraclius, as per source). However, the accounts have been variously interpreted by historians, that the Croatian war against the Avars possibly was a revolt after the Croats already settled in Dalmatia, were supported diplomatically by the Byzantine Empire after the unsuccessful Siege of Constantinople (626), or was a reference to the late 8th and early 9th century Frankish-Avar Wars (rejected). Although the Christianization of Croats began right after their arrival to Dalmatia, in the early 9th century a part of the Croats were still pagan, being a gradual process which continued in the 8th until mid-9th century.

By the early 9th century, Croatia emerged as a political entity with a duke as head of the state, territorially in the basins of the rivers Cetina, Krka and Zrmanja. It was administered in 11 counties (županija):

From that time they remained independent and autonomous, and they requested holy baptism from Rome, and bishops were sent and baptized them in the time of their Archon Porinos. Their land was divided in eleven zupanias, which are: Hlebiana, Tzenzena, Emota, Pleba, Pesenta, Parathalassia, Brebere, Nona, Tnena, Sidraga, Nina, and their ban has Kribasan, Litzan, Goutzeska.

— Constantine Porphyrogenitus in De Administrando Imperio

=== Archaeology ===
The evidence for the 7th century arrival of new Slavic(-Croatian) population are cremation burials, Prague culture pottery, fibulae and other artifacts found near them, which are atypical for a Roman and Christian population at the time, as well destruction of inhabitations and churches, and changes of native's lifestyle. In case of early Croats, the inhumation was also done making a burial chamber with wooden or stone structure, which "was a tradition brought from the original homeland of the Croats in the north, and had no parallels in the native regional cultures". However, although material culture proves migration of the Slavs, it is practically impossible to differentiate with early Slavic material culture the Slavic tribal ethnic identities from the general mass of Slavs.

Christianization possibly began to be more widely accepted since the 8th century. The cremation burials in the early 8th century were followed by cemeteries in rows with pagan burial practices until mid-9th century, then cemeteries in rows with pagan and Christian burial practices and cemeteries in rows with exclusively Christian burial practices until second-half of the 11th century, and cemeteries next to churches with burials from the 9th to 11th centuries, with mandatory burials next to churches since second-third of the 11th century.

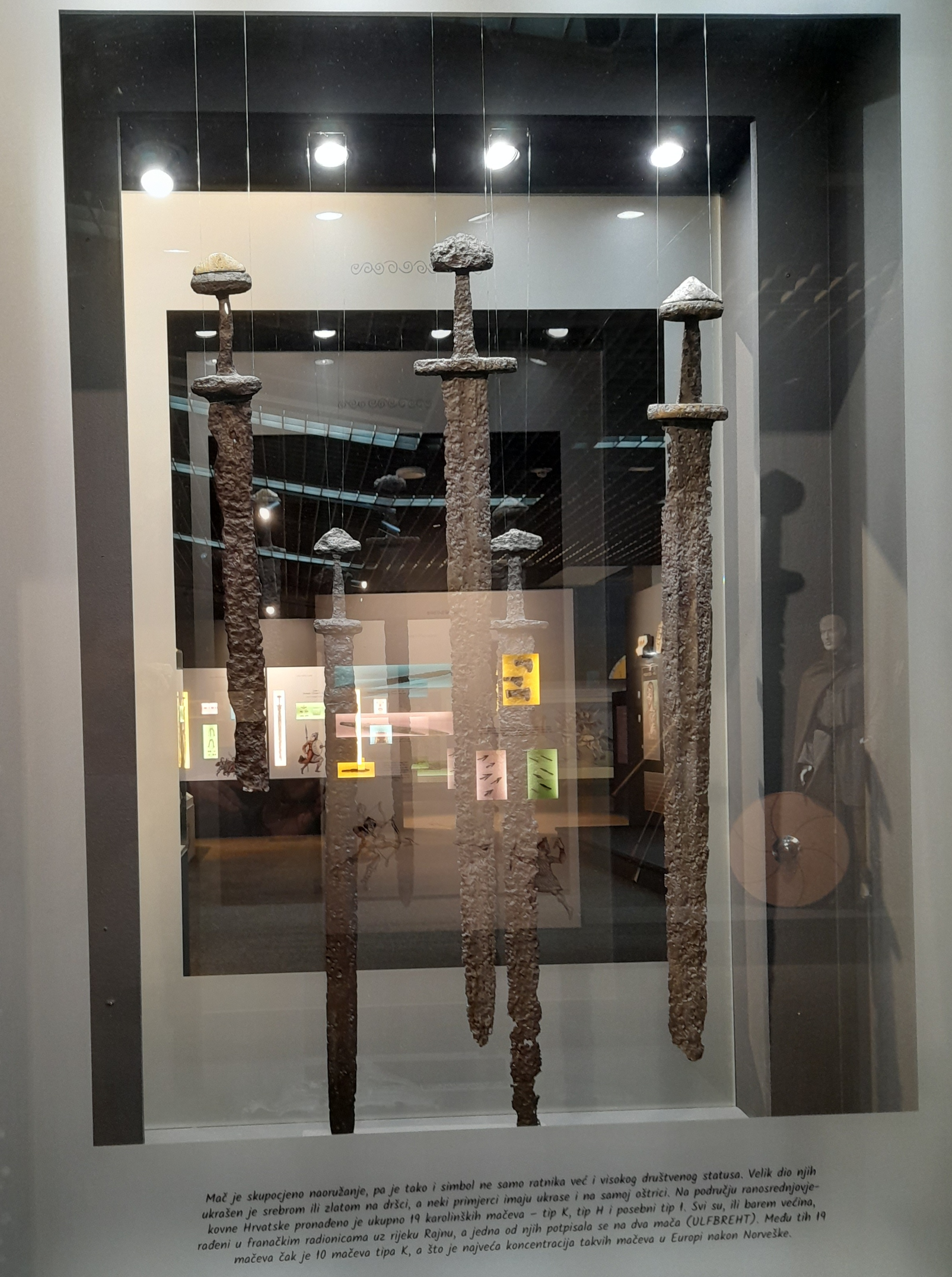
Carolingian swords from early medieval Croatia.

In the Pannonian part of Croatia both Early and Late Avar artefacts were found, while in the Littoral part of Croatia the findings of Avar origin are rare and only date to the Late Avar and post-Avar period. In Dalmatia they most probably were war booty from the Frankish-Avar Wars (788–803), or Battle of Kupa (819). Croats from the late-8th and in the 9th century have high concentration of Carolingian-Viking swords (over 24, mostly of K-type but also 1-type and H-type, post-Carolingian emerge R-type and X-type), and other war equipment (including a long knife, long spear, and arrows, as well boots with spurs, belt trappings and else of Carolingian influence), some considered as evidence of Croatian participation in the Frankish-Avar Wars in the late 8th and early 9th century (although Frankish sources do not mention Croatian ethnonym between early 7th and late 9th century), and being part of the Central-European and Carolingian political and cultural world of influence at least since duke Borna (c. 810–821). However, the distribution and concentration of K-type swords in Europe does not correspond with the hypothesis they were official armament of the Frankish army. They are neither evidence of a late 8th-early 9th century migration of Croats, as some scholars have argued, but as Frankish gifts of loyalty, were influential to the consolidation of the Croatian elite identity and ethnogenesis at the time. The distribution of post-Carolingian weapons and cavalry equipment in present-day Croatia and Bosnia and Herzegovina, found near old roads and often with gold coins of Constantine V (741–775) which were still in use, is within the borders and corresponding historical events related to the Duchy of Croatia and Kingdom of Croatia.

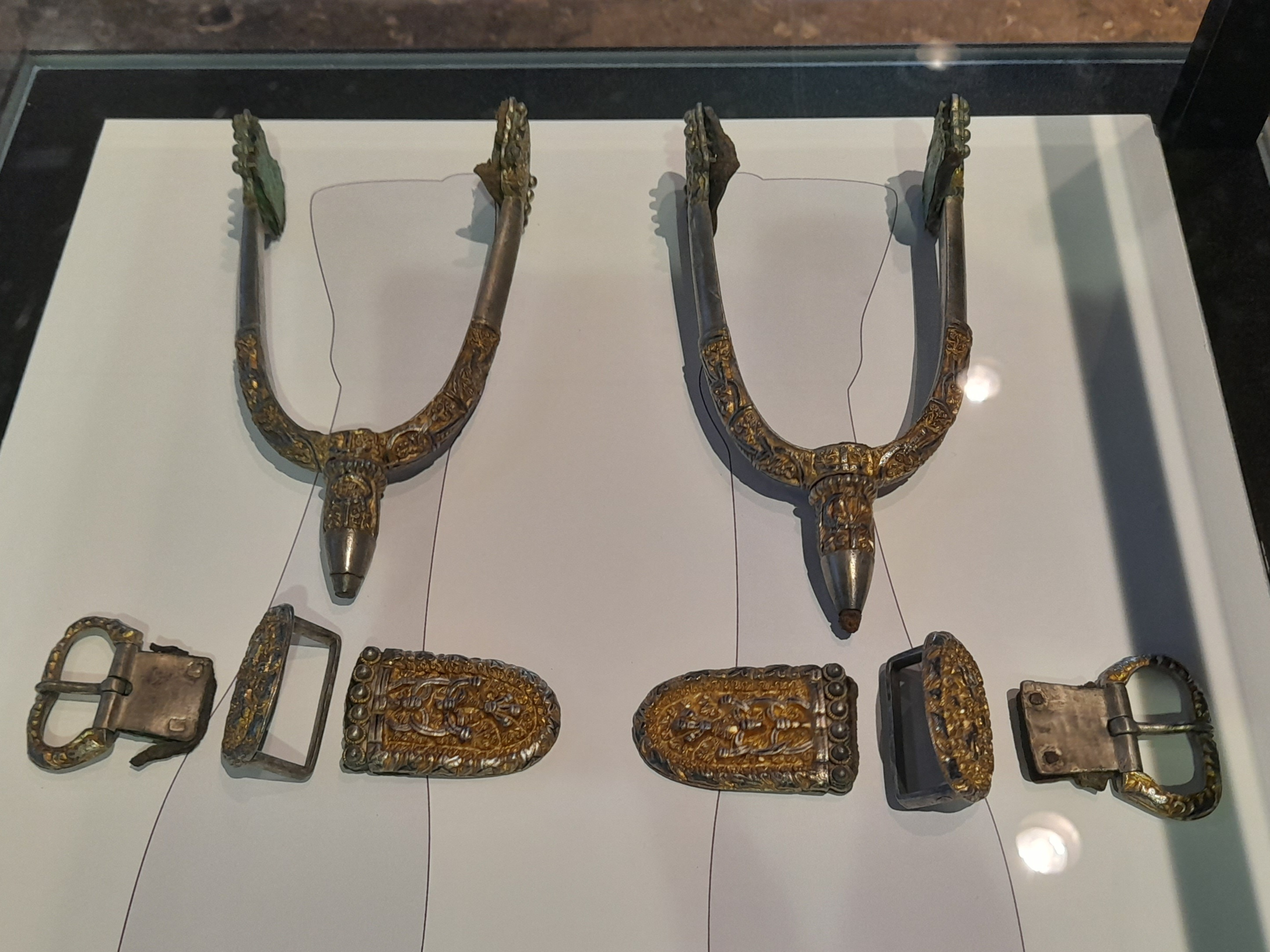
Golden spurs with mounting set from Brekinjova Kosa at Bojna near Glina in Lower Pannonia.

Recent archaeological findings from Brekinjova Kosa at Bojna near Glina in Lower Pannonia, including rich burial (golden spurs with mounting set, pendant with rock crystal, gold coin of Constantine V, clothing woven with gold threads) belonging to a local duke at Bojna, which have very similar analogies in Biskupija near Knin and Morpolača near Stankovci in Dalmatia, indicate it belonged to the Croats who spread control to the area around Sisak.

Female dress earrings (grape-like made of precious metals) and else include "examples of the craftsmanship of Byzantine goldsmiths, presumably imported through one of the cities in Dalmatia which was under Byzantine rule", but "are known to have been found in Western Pannonia". Simpler jewellery of silver and bronze are S-type (typical of Sclaveni) and pseudo-S-type earrings, omega-type and star-shaped pendants of Byzantine origin, and many rings and necklaces. Rare containers made of antlers and engraved with iconography (two horned animals facing the tree of life between them) were also found only in Western Pannonia (Sopron and Zalavar, Hungary). Artifacts made of bone, alongside other mentioned, suddenly disappear with the introduction of the Christian burial since the mid-9th century, as well were abandoned pagan necropolises (nearby which emerge graveyards of Christian ritual), but there was no destruction, which indicate that the "adoption of Christianity by the Croats was effected without great social upheavals". Several archaeological findings and inscriptions dating to the late 8th and first half of the 9th century in the territory of early medieval Croatia show missionary activity of the Patriarchate of Aquileia.

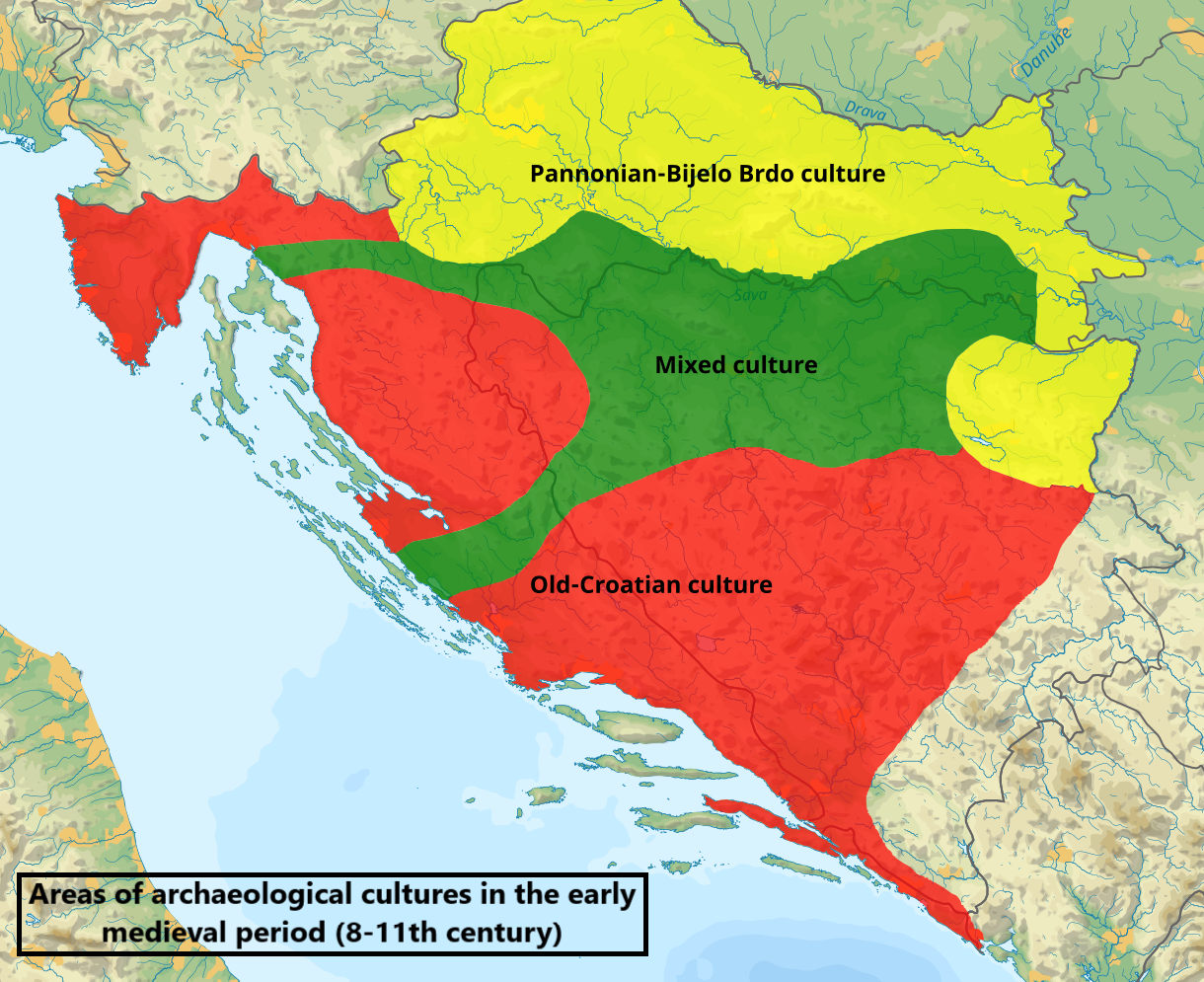
General spread of Old-Croatian and Pannonian-Bijelo Brdo culture artifacts during the course of the Early Mediaeval period (per Sokol 1999).

Some of the findings "are a characteristic of Croatian production". Since the mid-9th century flourished a distinctive Croatian-type production of jewellery (most notable being large bead shaped earrings with "no contemporary European parallel", while statistically by order earrings, pendants, rings, buttons, necklaces). The workshops probably were located in Solin and Knin in Dalmatia, and Sisak in the continental part. Archaeologists recognize and distinguish two cultural variants of the "Old-Croatian" archaeological period (7/9th-11th century), a proper Old-Croatian or Croatian-Dalmatian/Littoral culture, and Pannonian-Bijelo Brdo culture (since mid-10th century), which were contemporary to Carinthian-Köttlach culture in the west. Findings of the Croatian-Dalmatian variant were found from Istria down to Dubrovnik, in the hinterland near rivers Neretva, Vrbas and Bosna and into southwestern Pannonia, while the second variant was mostly present between Sava–Drava region in Croatia and in northern Bosnia and Herzegovina with some findings in Adriatic coast and hinterland. The archaeological findings of Croatian-Dalmatian culture in Lower Pannonia and northwestern Bosnia and Herzegovina, as well in Istria and eastern parts of Bosnia and Herzegovina, can be attributed to influence and trade, but also expansion of the early medieval Croatia.

=== Frankish vassalage ===
The Franks gained control of Pannonia and Dalmatia in the 790s and the first decade of the ninth century. In 788 Charlemagne, after conquering Lombardy, turned further east and subjugated Istria. In the 790s, Duke Vojnomir of Pannonia accepted the Frankish overlordship, whose land the Franks placed under the March of Friuli and tried to extend their rule over the Croatians of Dalmatia. In 799, the Franks under the leadership of Eric of Friuli were defeated in the Battle of Trsat in Liburnia. However, from 803 Frankish rule was recognized in most of northern Dalmatia. The Franks also waged wars with the Byzantine Empire until a peace treaty, known as the Pax Nicephori, was signed in 812. By that treaty the Byzantines retained control of the coastal cities and islands in Dalmatia, while acknowledging Frankish rule over Istria and the Dalmatian hinterland.

From c. 810 Borna ruled most of northern Dalmatia and was a vassal of the Carolingian Empire. Borna was Duke of the Guduscani (and later duke of Dalmatia, as well Dalmatia and Liburnia), a tribe that most probably lived in the region of Gacka (today in Lika). His rule was marked by the rebellion of Ljudevit Posavski against the Franks (defeating Cadolah of Friuli), and Ljudevit defeated Borna in the Battle of Kupa (819) somewhere near the River Kupa and began to ravage Dalmatia, but harsh conditions and constant attacks from Borna's men forced Ljudevit to retreat. In 821 Borna died and was succeeded by his nephew Vladislav and uncle Ljudemisl (who managed to kill Ljudevit).

The vassalage and conflict between Lower Pannonian Slavs and Franks, also possibly influenced by second 9th century conflict during Croatian duke Domagoj, is probably reflected in the 30th chapter account from De Administrando Imperio that "Until quite recently the Croats of Dalmatia also were subject to the Franks ... the Franks treated them with such brutality that they used to murder Croat babies and cast them to the dogs. The Croats, unable to endure such treatment from the Franks, revolted from them, and slew those of them whom they had for archontes. Because of this, a large army from Francia marched against them, and after they had fought one another for seven years, at last, and with hardship, the Croats managed to prevail and killed all the Franks and their archon, called Kotzil".

=== Between East and West ===
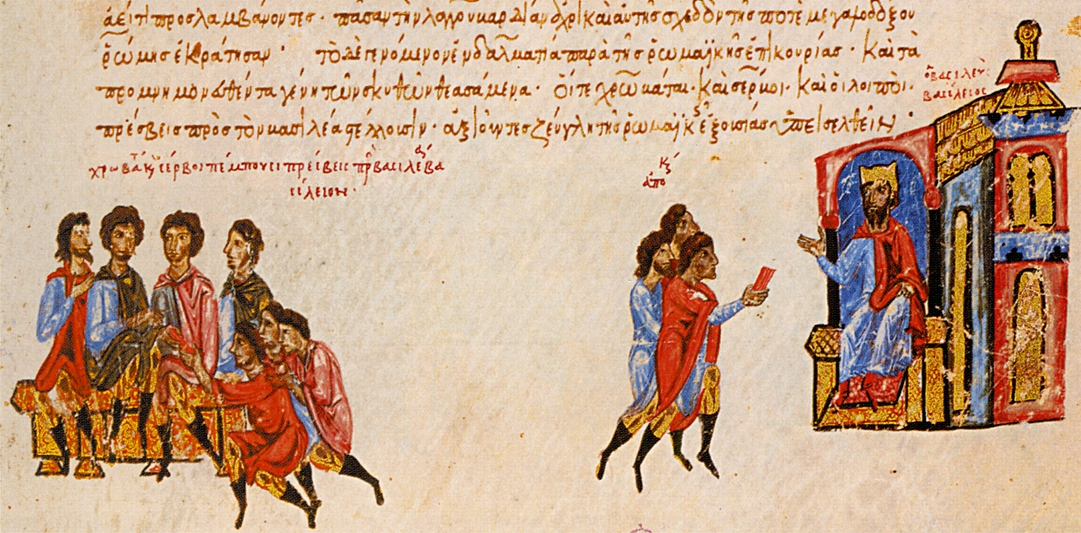
Delegation of Croats and Serbs to Basil I (867–886), in the Madrid Skylitzes (12th century).

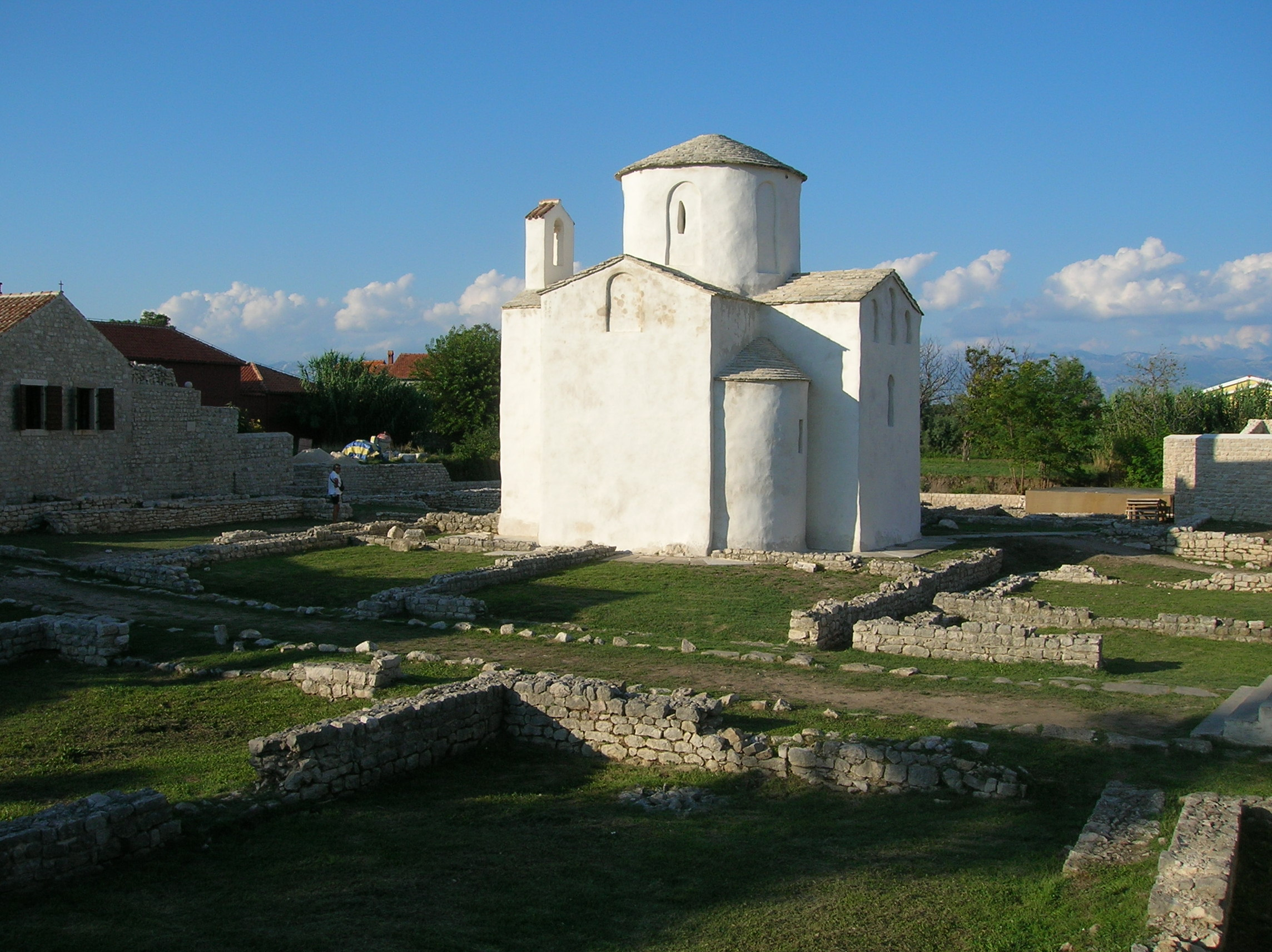
The Church of the Holy Cross in Nin from the 9th century.

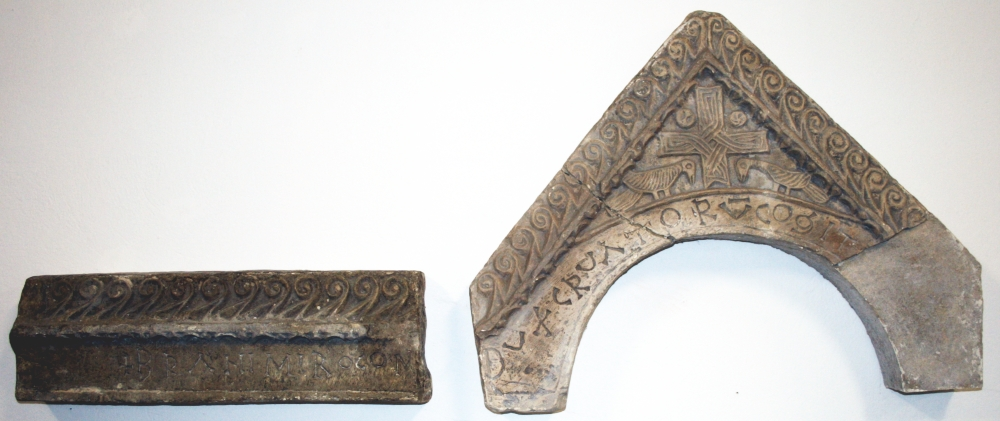
Branimir inscription (879–892), a Latin language reference to Duke Branimir as Dux Cruatorum.

The Duchy of Croatia was located between two major powers of the Middle Ages: the Eastern Roman Empire in the East which controlled the Dalmatian cities and islands and aimed to extend their rule over the entire former Roman province of Dalmatia, and the Franks in the West seeking to control the northern and northwestern lands. The Byzantine influence on Croatia was also reflected on the creation of Croatian law and in trade with the Byzantine coastal cities.

In the second quarter of the 9th century the Croats began developing a navy. Along with the Narentines, who were still pagan at the time and occupied the territory of the river Neretva mouth, they were active in the Adriatic Sea and made shipping and traveling in the area hazardous, especially for Venice. Therefore, in 839 the Venetians under Doge Pietro Tradonico attacked the eastern coast of the Adriatic, including Croatia, but during the assault they signed peace with their ruler, princeps Mislav (Latin: principe Muisclavo), who ruled from Klis near Split. The peace treaty was signed at a place named St. Martin. The Doge also attacked Narentine islands, but failed to defeat them and made peace with their leader, who is mentioned as count Drosaico by the chronicler John the Deacon. However, the peace treaty was short-lasting and next year the Venetians were defeated by the Narentines under count Diuditum. Piracy continued in the Adriatic, as well as hostility towards Venice, which is seen from the contract between Emperor Lothair I and Doge Tradonico, in which the Doge committed himself to defend the cities in Italy and Istria from Slavic attacks.

Duke Mislav was succeeded around 845 by Trpimir I, who continued the formal legacy of being the vassal of the Frankish king Lothair I (840–855), although he managed to strengthen his personal rule in Croatia. Arab campaigns thoroughly weakened the Byzantine Empire and Venice, which was used in the advance of the Croatian duke in 846 and 848. In 846, Trpimir successfully attacked the Byzantine coastal cities and their patricius. Between 854 and 860, he successfully defended his land from the Bulgarian invasion under Knyaz Boris I of Bulgaria, somewhere in Northeastern Bosnia, concluding a peace treaty with Boris and exchanging gifts. Constantine Porphyrogenitus mentions the traditional friendship between the Bulgarians and Croatians, who coexisted peacefully up to that time.

In a Latin charter preserved in a rewrite from 1568, dated to 4 March 852 or, according to a newer research, about 840, Trpimir refers to himself as "leader of the Croats with the help of God" (Latin: dux Croatorum iuvatus munere divino); his land, called "Kingdom of the Croats" (Latin: regnum Croatorum), can simply be interpreted as the "Realm of the Croats", since Trpimir was not a king. The term regnum was also used by other dukes of that time as a sign of their independence. This charter also documents his ownership of the Klis Fortress, from where his rule was centered, and mentions Mislav's donations to the Archbishopric of Split. In the proximity of his court in Klis, in Rižinice, Trpimir built a church and the first Benedictine monastery in Croatia. Trpimir's name is inscribed on a stone fragment from an altar screen of the Rižinice monastery church. He is more expressly remembered as the founder of the House of Trpimirović, a native Croat dynasty that ruled, with interruptions, from 845 until 1091 in Croatia.

In 864 Duke Domagoj, founder of the House of Domagojević, usurped the throne after the death of Trpimir and forced his sons, including Zdeslav, to flee to Constantinople. During the rule of Domagoj piracy was a common practice in the Adriatic. The pirates attacked Christian sailors, including a ship with papal legates returning from the Eighth Catholic Ecumenical Council, thus forcing the Pope to intervene by asking Domagoj to stop piracy, but his efforts were of no avail. Domagoj waged wars with the Arabs, Venetians and Franks. In 871, he helped the Franks, as their vassal, to seize Bari from the Arabs, but later actions of the Franks under the rule of Carloman of Bavaria led to a revolt by Domagoj against the Frankish rule. The revolt succeeded and Frankish overlordship in Dalmatia ended, but was to continue a little longer over Lower Pannonia. Domagoj's rule also saw increased Byzantine influence in the area, especially reflected in the establishment of Theme of Dalmatia. After the death of Domagoj in 876 Zdeslav, who had close ties to Byzantium, returned from exile, usurped the throne from an unnamed son of Domagoj and restored peace with Venice in 878.

=== Independent realm ===
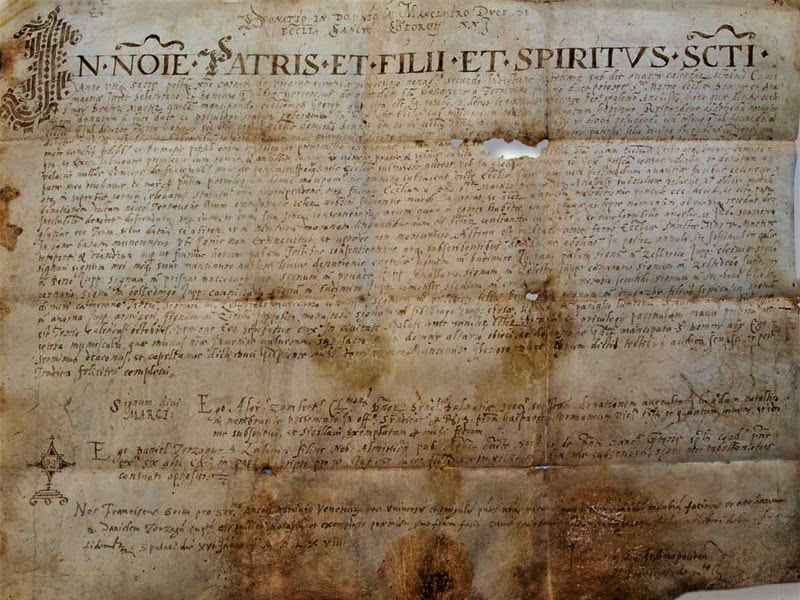
Duke Muncimir's charter from 892. (transcript): divino munere Croatorum dux ("with God's help, Duke of the Croats").

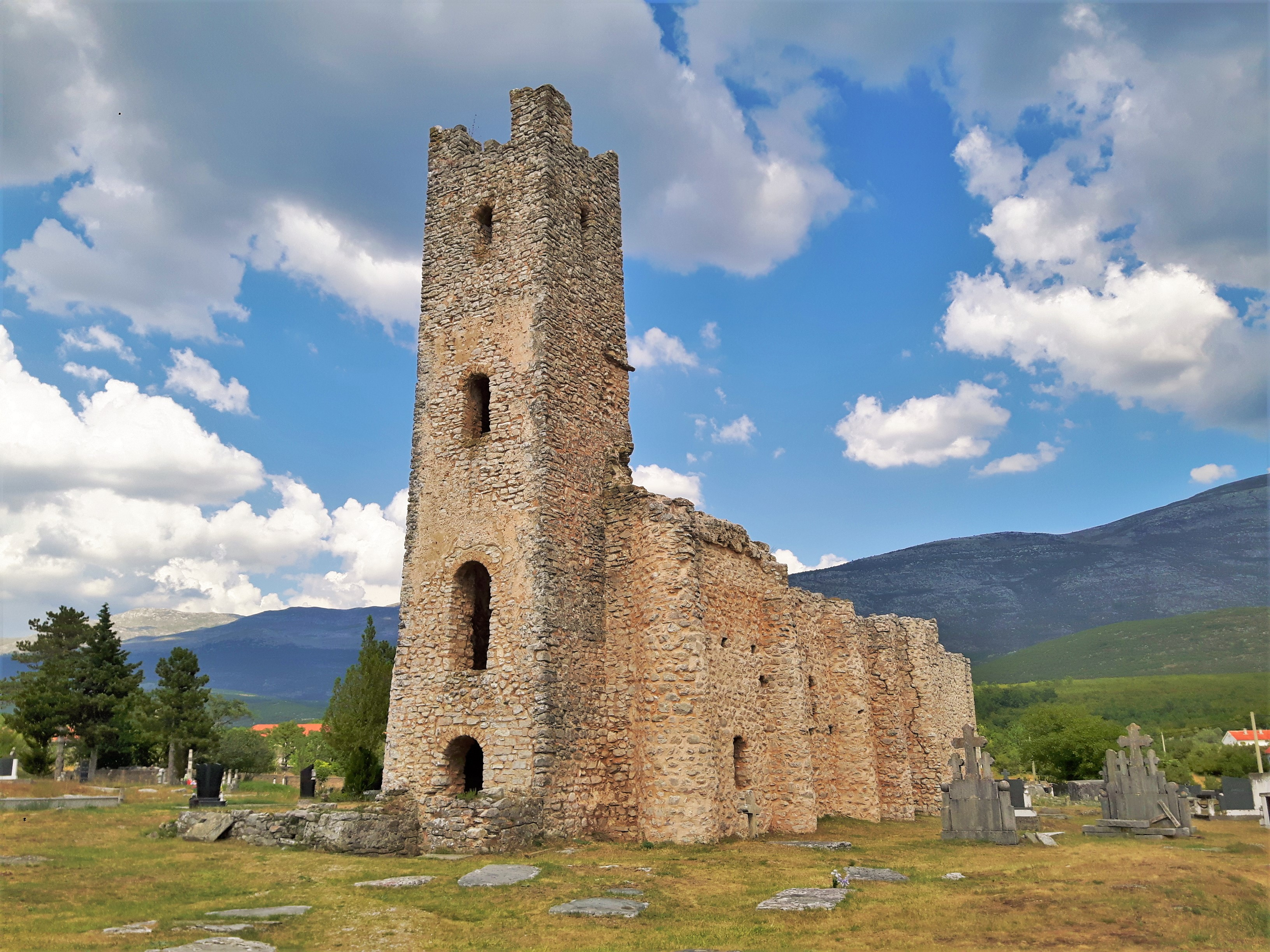
Church of Holy Salvation, Cetina with a Carolingian westwork from the late 9th century.

Duke Zdeslav's reign was short and ended in 879 when Branimir of the House of Domagojević killed him and usurped the throne. Branimir was unlike Zdeslav a proponent of Rome and returned the country to the Roman fold. He had regular contacts with Pope John VIII, to whom he sent a letter revealing his intentions to entrust his people and his country to the Apostolic See. The Pope replied to his requests, praising his initiative and in 879 the Duchy under Branimir, now free of Frankish suzerainty, received papal recognition as a state.

The second half of the 9th century marked a significant increase in papal influence in the Southeastern Europe. Pope John VIII complained to Domagoj about the obstinacy of Patriarch Ignatius who denied his jurisdiction over Bulgaria and appointed a new archbishop. The Pope also requested from Dukes Zdeslav and Branimir assistance and protection for his legates who were crossing Croatia on their way to Bulgaria. Although the exact geographical extent of the Duchy is not known, these requests confirm geographical contiguity between Croatia and Bulgaria, which bordered probably somewhere in Bosnia.

Muncimir (also called Mutimir), the youngest son of Trpimir, came to throne after the death of Branimir (c. 892), which marked the return of the House of Trpimirović to power. A Latin charter from Biaći near Trogir dated to 28 September 892 named Muncimir "Duke of the Croats" (Latin: Croatorum dux). During his rule, in the late 9th century the Hungarians crossed the Carpathians and entered the Carpathian Basin. They invaded northern Italy and also defeated Duke Braslav from the Duchy of Pannonia, endangering Croatia.

Muncimir ruled until about 910 when he was succeeded by Tomislav, the last duke and the first king of Croatia. Venetian chronicler John the Deacon wrote that in 912 a Venetian ambassador, returning from Bulgaria, passed through Croatian territory before reaching the land of Zahumlje, which suggests that Croatia at the time also bordered Bulgaria, then under the rule of Simeon I. In Historia Salonitana, a chronicle from the 13th century written by Thomas the Archdeacon from Split, Tomislav was mentioned as Duke of Croatia in 914. According to De Administrando Imperio, Croatia at the time had 100,000 infantrymen and 60,000 horsemen, 80 large ships and 100 smaller vessels, but these numbers are viewed as a clear exaggeration and an overemphasis of the Croatian forces. Croatia also waged battles with the Magyars during the early 10th century. According to the palaeographic analysis of the original manuscript of De Administrando Imperio, assumed number of inhabitants in medieval Croatia estimated between 440,000 and 880,000 people, and military numbers of Franks and Byzantines, the military force was most probably composed of 20,000–100,000 infantrymen, and 3,000–24,000 horsemen organized in 60 allagions.

During the war between the Byzantium and Bulgaria of Simeon I, in about 923, the Byzantines concluded an alliance with Croatia. Prior to that the Bulgarians had several decisive victories against the Byzantines, capturing Adrianople and endangering Constantinople. In 924, Simeon I deposed Zaharija from rule in Serbia, who fled to Croatia. In 926, Simeon's troops invaded Croatia, but were severely defeated in the Battle of the Bosnian Highlands. In 927 Pope John X sent his legates to mediate a peace treaty between Croats and Bulgarians.

During these years Croatia was elevated to the status of a kingdom. It is generally said that Duke Tomislav was crowned king in 925, but this is not certain since it is not known when and where was he crowned, or was he crowned at all. However, Tomislav was the first Croatian ruler whom the Papal chancellery honoured with the title king. Tomislav is mentioned as a king in two preserved documents published in the Historia Salonitana and by the Chronicle of the Priest of Duklja, where Tomislav's rule was specified at 13 years. In a note preceding the text of the Council conclusions in Split in 925 it is written that Tomislav is the king "in the province of the Croats and in the Dalmatian regions" (in prouintia Croatorum et Dalmatiarum finibus Tamisclao rege). In the 12th canon of the Council conclusions in 925 the ruler of the Croats is called "king" (rex et proceres Chroatorum), while in a letter sent by the Pope John X Tomislav is named "King of the Croats" (Tamisclao, regi Crouatorum). Although there are no inscriptions of Tomislav to confirm the title, later inscriptions and charters confirm that his 10th century successors called themselves "kings".

== See also ==
- History of Croatia
- Croatian–Bulgarian Wars
- List of dukes and kings of Croatia
