= Vladislav, Duke of Croatia =

Vladislav
- Duke of Croatia; Duke of Dalmatia and Liburnia
- Reign: 821–c. 835
- Predecessor: Borna
- Successor: Mislav
- Died: c. 835
- Father: unknown
- Mother: sister of Duke Borna
- Religion: Christianity

Ladasclavus, transliterated as Vladislav or Ladislas (fl. 821) was a duke of the medieval duchy of Croatia. In sources he is mentioned as the Duke of Dalmatia and Liburnia (dux Dalmatiae atque Liburnae), having succeeded his uncle Borna, a Frankish vassal. He is mentioned only in the 9th-century Royal Frankish Annals, regarding year 821. Borna had died between January and October 821, during a war against Frankish rebel Ljudevit, Duke of Pannonian Croatia. Borna's nephew (by his sister) Vladislav succeeded him, by the people's will and emperor's approval. Vladislav ruled from Nin as a loyal vassal of the Frankish Emperor Lothair I. In historiography, his realm has been referred to as Dalmatian Croatia or Littoral Croatia, where he was succeeded by Duke Mislav.

== Sources ==
- Fine, John Van Antwerp Jr. (2005). When Ethnicity Did Not Matter in the Balkans: A Study of Identity in Pre-Nationalist Croatia, Dalmatia, and Slavonia in the Medieval and Early-Modern Periods. Ann Arbor, Michigan: University of Michigan Press. ISBN 0-472-02560-0.
- Scholz, Bernhard Walter, ed. (1970). Carolingian Chronicles: Royal Frankish Annals and Nithard's Histories. University of Michigan Press. ISBN 0-472-06186-0.
- Živković, Tibor (2011). "The Origin of the Royal Frankish Annalist's Information about the Serbs in Dalmatia". Homage to Academician Sima Ćirković. Belgrade: The Institute for History. pp. 381–398. ISBN 978-86-7743-091-7.

Preceded by Borna	Duke of Croatia	Vacant Title next held by Possibly Mislav as Sclaveniam ... principe
