= Guduscani =

Disputed medieval Croatian tribe

Gacka and Bribir županijas, where the Guduscans may have lived

The Guduscani or Goduscani (Croatian: Guduščani, Gačani) were a community whose location and origin on the territory of early medieval Croatia remains a matter of dispute. According to different hypotheses, they were a tribe or clan of Croats or other inhabitants that were located around the river Gacka in the Lika region or around the river Guduča near Bribir in the Dalmatian region.

== Etymology ==
They are mentioned three times in the Frankish Annals (Guduscani, Guduscanorum, Guduscanis) and twice in Vita Hludovici (Goduscanorum). Petar Skok and Radoslav Katičić derived their ethnonym from Proto-Slavic *gъd-, similar to Proto-Prussian gude in the meaning of "forest". Skok, and Petar Šimunović, also derived it from Proto-Slavic *gadъ (<gu-odh-/*guedh-), "snake", or *gatъ, "gap, depth, dam".

Constantine VII (905–959) mentioned in his work De Administrando Imperio a županija in Croatia in the 10th century called "Gūtzēkă" ("*Gъtьska"), which is translated as Gacka. Scholars tried to connect toponym Gacka with the ethnonym of the Guduscani (*Gъdъska, with "d" instead of "t" due to Frankish misunderstanding, original form being *Gъtаne, *Gъtьci > *Gъtьča > *Gъčani > Gačani), but although it is not certain that the toponym got its name from the ethnonym, the Latin suffix "-anus" shows that the name Guduscani merely had territorial meaning of the "inhabitants of Gacka". In that sense, another theory explains their etnonym as the "inhabitants of Guduča", a confluence of Krka river near Bribir in Dalmatia. This theory has gained more prominence lately in the Croatian historiography because for the region of Gacka there's no written or material sources which would indicate its notoriety in the 9th century, meanwhile Guduča was located in the very centre of the early medieval Croatia, nearby was significant stronghold Bribir with archaeological findings (including of a sword), and the river once had larger body of water which was relevant to the fields of both Bribir and Ostrovica.

The hypothetical derivation from the toponym of Roman city of Guduscum (Kučevo in Serbia) is rejected by now because such a toponym never existed. The theory relating their name to the name of Goths is problematic because the suffix indicates that the ethnonym originates from name of a place and not people.

== History ==
In the Frankish Annals, the Guduscani are mentioned as allies to the Carolingians, and the Duke Borna is mentioned as "dux Dalmaciae", "dux Dalmatiae et Liburniae" and "dux Guduscanorum". However, there exist different semantic readings of the source, some saying that Borna was the duke of Guduscani, or of Guduscani and Timočani or a separate duke from both of them.

Borna seemingly was the first titled duke, i.e. prince (dux) of Guduscani, which indicates that the Guduscans initially could have been the temporary basis of Borna's authority and could have occupied a much larger territory from Bribir (river Guduča, a confluence of Krka river) in Dalmatia to Gacka in Lika, south of Lower Pannonia. The old consideration that the Guduscani originated from the territory of Moesia (present-day Serbia) and that together with the Timočani became allies of the Franks is disputable due to lack of evidence and arguments.

In 818 they were part of an envoy of Borna sent with the other South Slavic tribes (nationes) of Timočani and Praedenecenti (possibly an off-shot of Abodrites) to the court of Louis the Pious in Herstal. Some scholars also related them to the Khashānīn (possibly Kashubians) mentioned by Al-Masudi. In 819 alongside Borna fought against Ljudevit, the Duke of the Slavs in Lower Pannonia. They were part of the army of Borna against Ljudevit at the Battle of Kupa (819) but deserted before the battle. Borna conquered their lands again upon returning from the battle.

== Identity ==
Seemingly only after the fall of Guduscani, and during the time of Mislav or Trpimir, a dynasty with undisputed Croatian identity was imposed and spread it further. It's often argued that Borna possibly was their gentile chieftain, and they represented only one small tribe among others in medieval Croatia. Depending on the interpretation of the Byzantine and Frankish sources, some historians consider them to be a tribe separate from the Croats and that the emergence of the Croatian political identity and power is not related to the region of Lika yet of Northern Dalmatia. However, Borna most probably was not a member of the Guduscani because they later deserted him and got reconquered. The events and their behavior could also indicate that the Guduscani were a separate identity and group from the Croats in Dalmatia, possibly related to the account of Avars living in Croatia from De Administrando Imperio, and that they were more similar or shared more history with the Pannonian Slavs than the Croats. However, recent findings of Carolingian artefacts in Gacka "separates Lika from the so-called Avar syndrome that numerous historians in the past, without any significant archaeological findings, have depicted". The view that the Guduscani were Gothic remnants is not widely accepted, as the state of the Goths was in Italy and it ceased to exist in the mid-6th century, while their presence in the former Roman province of Dalmatia and Liburnia was not dominant, however, there were Valagoths as well in the region.

== Sources ==
- Džino, Danijel (2010). Becoming Slav, Becoming Croat: Identity Transformations in Post-Roman and Early Medieval Dalmatia. BRILL. pp. 182–186, 200–201. ISBN 978-90-04-18646-0.
- Scholz, Bernhard Walter (1970). Carolingian Chronicles: Royal Frankish Annals and Nithard's Histories. University of Michigan Press. pp. 104–106. ISBN 0-472-06186-0.
- Gračanin, Hrvoje (2012). "Guduskani/Guduščani - Gačani: promišljanja o etnonimu Gačani i horonimu Gacka u svjetlu ranosrednjovjekovnih narativa i suvremenih historiografskih tumačenja" [The Guduskani/Guduščani-Gačani: Considerations about the Ethnonym Gačani and the Choronym Gacka in Light of the Early Medieval Narratives and Modern Historiographic Interpretations]. Gacka i Otočac u srednjem vijeku. Institut društvenih znanosti Ivo Pilar. pp. 49–69.
- Komatina, Predrag (2019). "Рани јужнословенски етноними и питање порекла и постанка јужнословенских племена" [Early South Slavic Ethnonyms and the Issue of Origin and Genesis of the South Slavic Tribes]. Наслеђе и стварање Свети Ћирило: Свети Сава 869-1219-2019 I (in Serbian). Belgrade: Institute of the Serbian Language of the Serbian Academy of Sciences and Arts. pp. 3–28. ISBN 978-86-82873-70-9.
- Filipec, Krešimir (2012). "Guduscani 9. stoljeća između kneza Borne i kneza Ljudevita" [The Guduscani of the Ninth Century between the Princes Borna and Liudevit]. Gacka i Otočac u srednjem vijeku. Institut društvenih znanosti Ivo Pilar. pp. 69–82.
- Budak, Neven (2018). Hrvatska povijest od 550. do 1100 [Croatian history from 550 until 1100]. Leykam international. ISBN 978-953-340-061-7. Archived from the original on 2022-10-03.
