= Ljudemisl =

Duke of The Croats

Liudemuhls or Ljudemisl was a medieval Slavic duke, vassal to the Franks, who was in power in 823 in parts of Dalmatia known as the Duchy of the Croats.

Ljudemisl was the maternal uncle of Borna, the Duke of Dalmatia (r. 819–821). After Ljudevit had left the Serbs, he was a guest of Ljudemisl, who treacherously killed him. Ljudemisl may have done so to fortify his claim to power under the Franks.

== Sources ==
- Fine, John Van Antwerp Jr. (2005). When Ethnicity Did Not Matter in the Balkans: A Study of Identity in Pre-Nationalist Croatia, Dalmatia, and Slavonia in the Medieval and Early-Modern Periods. Ann Arbor, Michigan: University of Michigan Press. ISBN 0472025600.
- Scholz, Bernhard Walter, ed. (1970). Carolingian Chronicles: Royal Frankish Annals and Nithard's Histories. University of Michigan Press. ISBN 0472061860.
- Živković, Tibor (2011). "The Origin of the Royal Frankish Annalist's Information about the Serbs in Dalmatia". Homage to Academician Sima Ćirković. Belgrade: The Institute for History. pp. 381–398. ISBN 9788677430917.
