= Višeslav of Croatia =

9th century duke in Croatia

Europe in 814.

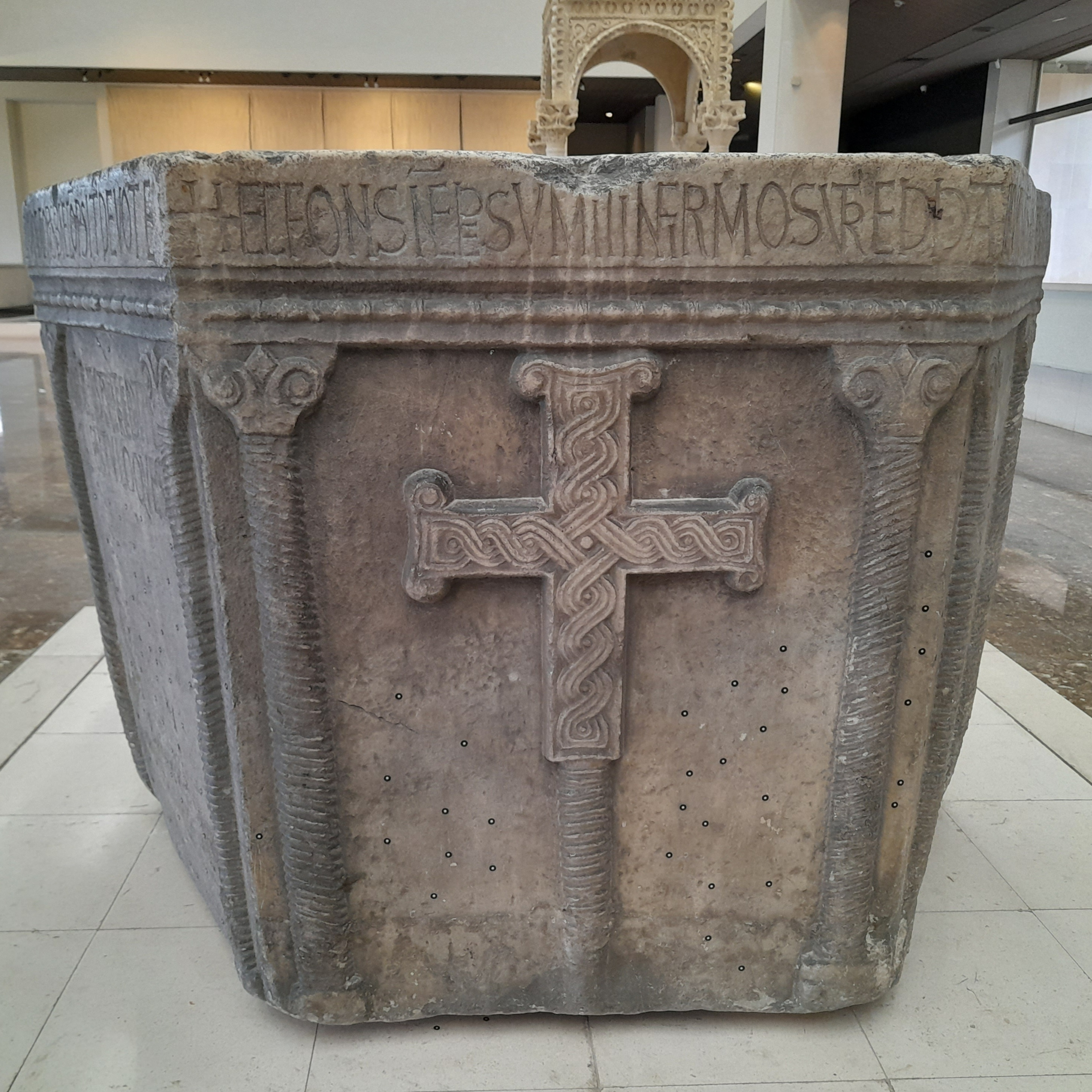
Baptismal font of Prince Višeslav.

Vuissasclavus (Latin), transliterated Višeslav (Croatian), was a duke (Latin: dux; Croatian: knez) who is believed to have ruled somewhere in or near Duchy of Croatia in the 9th century.

Višeslav's name is known from an inscription left on the Baptismal font of Prince Višeslav, surviving to this day. The font is considered a symbol of early Croatian history and the people's conversion to Christianity. The inscription is in Latin and mentions the name of a priest named John (Ivan) who baptized people during "the time of Duke Višeslav" in the honor of John the Baptist.

Historians have been making numerous attempts to date the reign of Višeslav, and to locate his domain geographically, and older Croatian historiography has many claims about this, but there is no present-day consensus about where or when he ruled beyond a Slavic group Christianized by the Carolingians in the early or mid-late 9th century.

He has also been identified with the late 8th century duke Višeslav/Vojislav of Serbia (c. 780), a late 9th century duke Višeslav (c. 870–900) who was father of Michael of Zahumlje (floruit c. 910–935), or was the unnamed son (876–878) of the Croatian duke Domagoj (864–876).
