= Mislav, Duke of Croatia =

Mislav
- Duke
- Reign: c. 835–845
- Predecessor: Vladislav
- Successor: Trpimir I
- Religion: Christianity

Mislav (Latin: Muisclavo) was a duke (Croatian: knez) in Croatia from around 835 until his death around 845.

Mislav came to power at some point after Vladislav as the Duke of Dalmatian Croatia. He ruled from Klis in central Dalmatia, when he made Klis Fortress seat to his throne. Mislav was a pious ruler. He built the Church of Saint George in Putalj (on the slopes of hill Kozjak). Today's Kaštel Sućurac got its name after the village of Sv. Jure (Saint George), named after that church.

Very little is known about the rule of Mislav. He is chiefly known for signing a treaty with Pietro Tradonico, Doge of the Venetian Republic in 839, which led to the growth of Croatian sea power. Duke Mislav maintained good relations with the neighbouring coastal Cities of Byzantine Dalmatia unlike his predecessor, which also led to the growth of Croatian sea power as Mislav modelled Croatian ships in the likehood of the Neretvians and Venetians.

Mislav was succeeded by Trpimir I after his death around 845. It is not known whether Trpimir was related to him.

Today, there are 2 known epigraphic inscriptions, mostly altar beams from old Croatian churches (from Donje Biljane and Pridraga), that bear the name of Duke Mislav. They are "the earliest epigraphic mentions of a Croatian ruler".

Mislav
Preceded by Vladislav	Duke of the Croats c. 835-845	Succeeded by Trpimir I
