= Timočani =

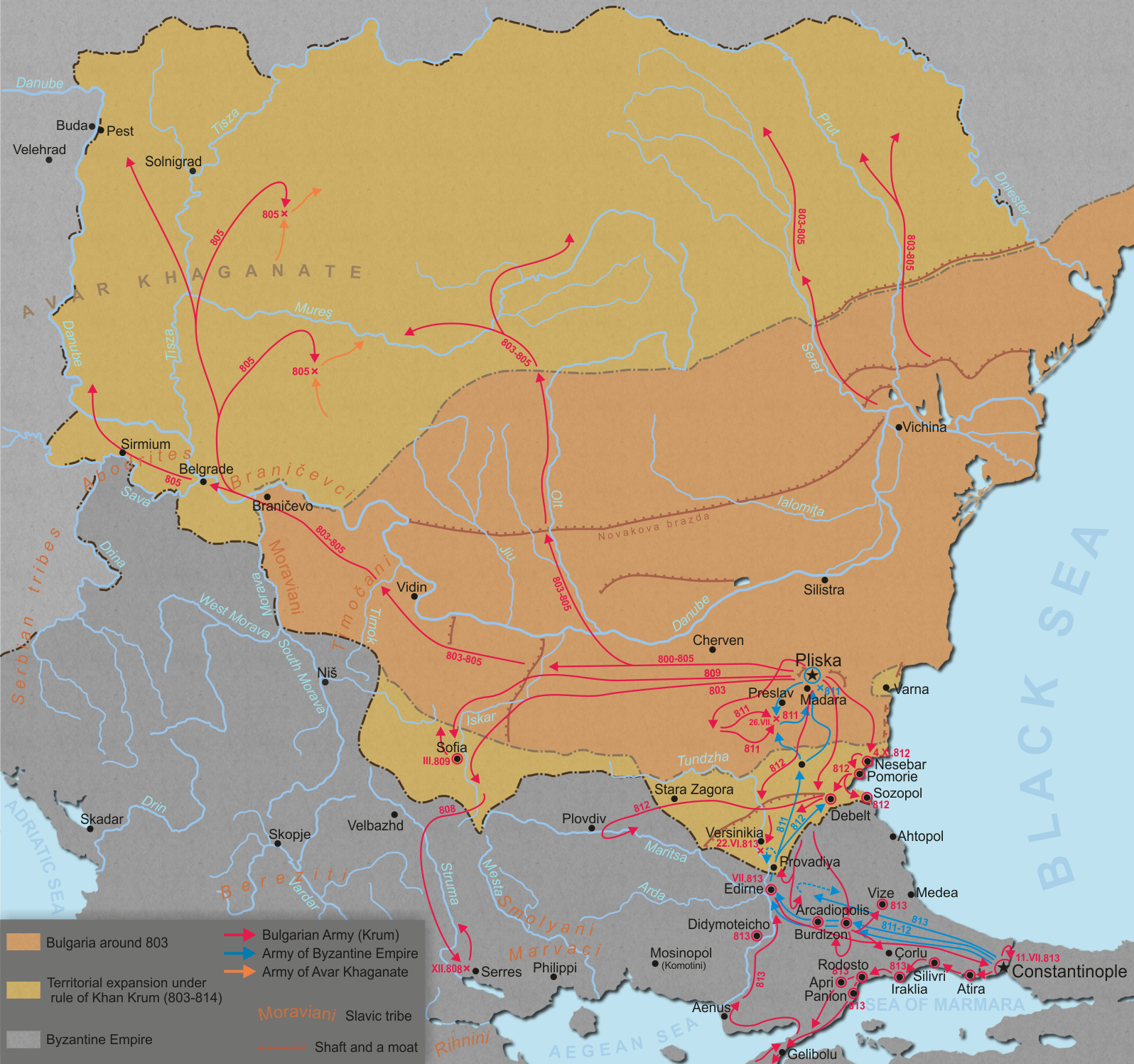
The location of the Timočani during the reign of Khan Krum of the First Bulgarian Empire.

The Timočani (also called Timochani, or Timochans; Serbian and Bulgarian: Тимочани) were a medieval early Slavic tribe that lived along the Timok River, as well as in the regions of Banat and Syrmia.

== Etymology ==
The name of the group was derived from the Timok River. Nowadays, "Timočani" is also used as an informal name for the inhabitants of the Timok Valley in Serbia.

== History ==
Timočani settled in the Balkans in the 6–7th century in the former Roman province of Dacia Ripensis and later became subjects of the Avar Khaganate. With the arrival of the Bulgars in the 7th century, they came under Bulgarian suzerainty, but for an extended period of time between the mid-8th and early 9th century, local Slavs lived in a state of anarchy. This ended around the year 805, when the area was reconquered by the Bulgar Khanate under Khan Krum. In the beginning of the 9th century, the Timočani were also attacked from the West by the Serbs.

In 818, during the rule of Omurtag of Bulgaria (814–836), the Timočani revolted together with other border tribes of the First Bulgarian Empire against a centralizing administrative reform that deprived them of much of their local authority. They left the Bulgarian "society" (meaning association or alliance), and together with other Slavic tribes, searched for protection from the Holy Roman Emperor Louis the Pious, later meeting with him directly at his court at Herstal. However, the Timočani also joined the rebellion of lower Pannonian Duke Ljudevit against the Franks. Many Timočani fled to Transdanubia, later becoming part of the Lower Pannonian Principality. Omurtag decided to settle the matter diplomatically in 824–826, but Louis did not reply to his correspondence. This prompted Omurtag to undertake a riparian naval campaign on the Drava in 827 and invade the lands of the Timočani in Sirmium, successfully reimposing Bulgar rule.

== See also ==
- List of Medieval Slavic tribes
