= Croatian World Games =

Olympics-style amateur multi-sport competition

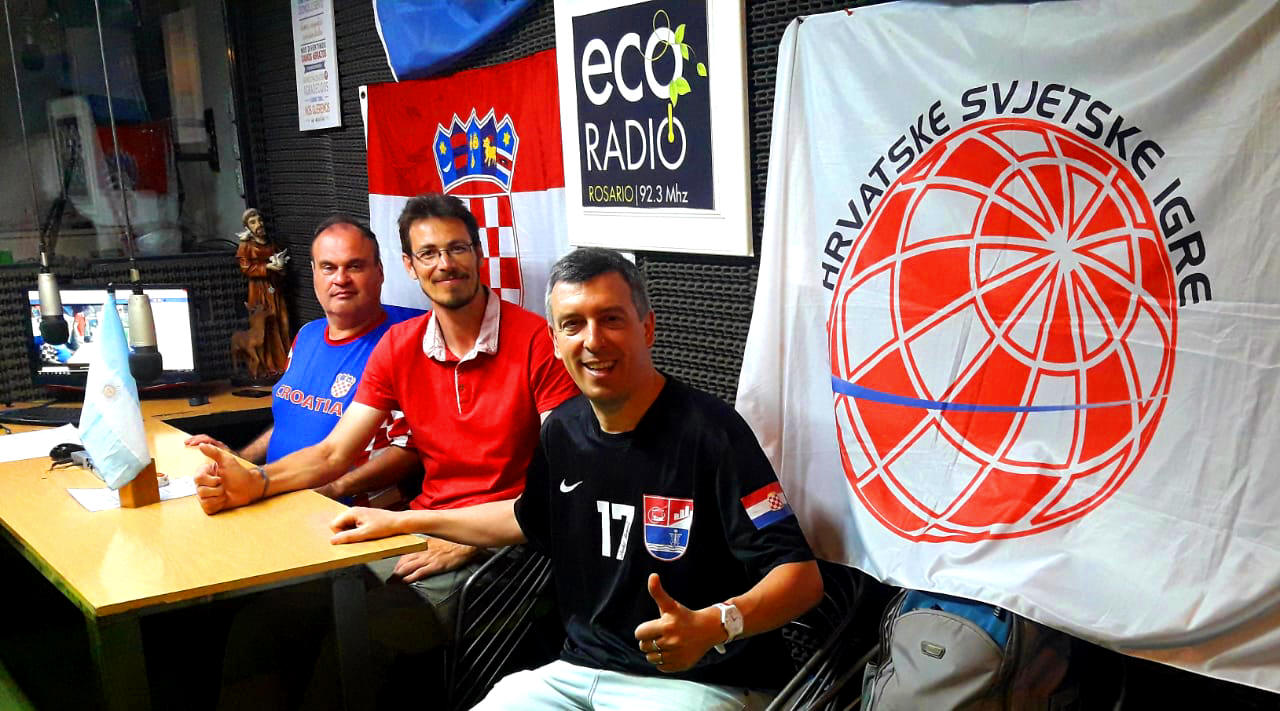
Radio transmission of the Games in Rosario, Argentina.

The Croatian World Games (Croatian: Hrvatske svjetske igre, Spanish: Juegos Croatas Mundiales, Juegos Mundiales Croatas) are an Olympics-style amateur multi-sport competition pitting autochthonous Croat communities in Croatia and neighbouring nations against each other and Croatian diaspora communities, representing countries they live in. The event is organized by the Croatian Olympic Committee and the Croatian World Congress. It is also known under the unofficial name Crolympics (Croatian: Crolimpijada), with the motto "Olympic games with Croatian sign".

The goal of the Games is connecting young Croats from all over the world through sports and cultural gatherings, and to encourage them to cultivate their Croatian identity.

== Editions ==
The first and the second Games were held in Zadar in 2006 and 2010, and the third Games were held in Zagreb in 2014. For 2014 edition, interest for hosting was shown by Split, Šibenik and Međugorje.

First Games were opened at Zadar's Forum, after Holy Mass in Cathedral of St. Anastasia, by the honorary president of the Croatian Olympic Committee Antun Vrdoljak and participants were greeted by Šimun Šito Čorić (hr).

Second Games were hosted by Zadar County and Zadar Archdiocese. Before the opening ceremony, Holy Mass was served in the Cathedral of St. Anastasia by Gospić-Senj bishop Mile Bogović. Games were opened by Canadian minister of Croatian descent Lynne Yelich and Croatian minister of foreign affairs Gordan Jandroković.

Third Games were first time hosted by Zagreb and held under auspices of the President of Croatia, Sabor, Central State office for Croats Abroad, City of Zagreb and Croatian Heritage Foundation. Games were opened by the Speaker of the Croatian Parliament Josip Leko.

4th Games were held under the auspices of the President of the Republic of Croatia Kolinda Grabar-Kitarović. They were opened at the Ban Jelačić Square by Croatian prime minister Andrej Plenković.

Originally, 5th Games should have been held from 26 to 30 July 2022, but due to COVID-19 pandemic Croatian World Congress postponed them to the last week of July 2023 at the Executive Board level on 6 November 2021.

5th Games were held under the auspices of the Croatian Government, Central State office for Croats Abroad, City of Zagreb, Croatian Heritage Foundation, Croatian Chamber of Economy, Croatian Olympic Committee and Croatian Radiotelevision. They were opened by Croatian minister of foreign affairs Gordan Grlić Radman. Before the opening ceremony, Holy Mass was served in the parish church of Our Lady of Freedom by Vinko Puljić. Opening ceremony was accompanied by concert of Zaprešić Boys (hr), Folklore ensemble "Ivan Goran Kovačić" from Zagreb (hr), KUD Preporod from Dugo Selo and Klapa Stine from Zagreb.

Croatian World Games (CWG) Croatian: Hrvatske svjetske igre (HSI)
Edition	Time	Host	Motto	Participants	Countries	Sports/Events	Reference(s)
1st	15 – 21 July 2006	Zadar	"Dobro došli kući!" (Welcome home!)	2,500	25	12	
2nd	18 – 23 July 2010	Zadar	"Jedno srce" (One heart)	750	24		
3rd	21 – 26 July 2014	Zagreb	"Jedno je srce" (One heart)	800	37	16	
4th	18 – 22 July 2017	Zagreb	"Jedno je srce, jedna je Hrvatska" (One heart, One Croatia)	1050	31	17	
5th	24 – 29 July 2023	Zagreb	"Jedno srce, jedna Hrvatska" (One heart, One Croatia)	950	26	21	
6th	2027.	Mostar					

== Sports in the Croatian World Games ==
- Athletics*
- Archery
- Badminton
- Basketball
- Beach volleyball
- Bocce
- Boxing
- Cycling
- Equestrian
- Football
- Gymnastics
- Handball
- Judo*
- Karate*
- Shooting
- Swimming
- Taekwondo*
- Tennis
- Volleyball
- Weightlifting
- Wrestling

Note: Sports with asterisk (*) were introduced at the 2014 Games.

Research from 2019 indicates that, among CWG's participants, greatest number of them did volleyball, association football, futsal, karate and basketball. 60% participants in the survey stated that they trained at least one sport more than ten years, and around 20% of them participated in the Games two times, while 70% participated first time.

== Countries of the participants ==
- Africa: South Africa
- Europe: Austria, Belgium, Bosnia and Herzegovina, Croatia, Denmark, Germany, Hungary, France, Italy, Montenegro, Netherlands, North Macedonia, Romania, Slovakia, Slovenia, Serbia, Spain, Sweden, Switzerland
- Oceania: Australia
- North America: Canada, USA
- South America: Argentina, Brasil, Chile, Equador, Peru, Venezuela

According to research from 2019, greatest number of participants came from Bosnia and Herzegovina, Germany, Austria, Switzerland, Romania, Canada, Australia and Montenegro.

== Results ==
=== 2006 ===
Rank	Nation	Gold	Silver	Bronze	Total
1	Croatia	21	20	28	69
2	United States	14	9	1	24
3	Bosnia and Herzegovina	4	9	3	16
4	Croatian World Games Team	4	0	5	9
5	France	1	6	1	8
6	Australia	1	1	1	3
6	Canada	1	1	1	3
6	Ecuador	1	1	1	3
6	South Africa	1	1	1	3
6	Venezuela	1	1	1	3
11	Serbia	1	0	1	2
11	Spain	1	0	1	2
13	Switzerland	0	2	1	3
14	Romania	0	1	0	1
15	Italy	0	0	1	1
15	Slovenia	0	0	1	1
15	Sweden	0	0	1	1
Totals (17 entries)		51	52	49	152

== See also ==
- World Polonia Games
- Pan Armenian Games

== Literature ==
- Mandić, Lucijana (2019). Izazovi u organizaciji sportskog događaja [Challenge in organisation of a sport event] (Thesis) (in Croatian). Zagreb: University of Zagreb, Faculty of Economics and Business, Department of Marketing.
