= Croats =

South Slavic ethnic group

Croats Hrvati
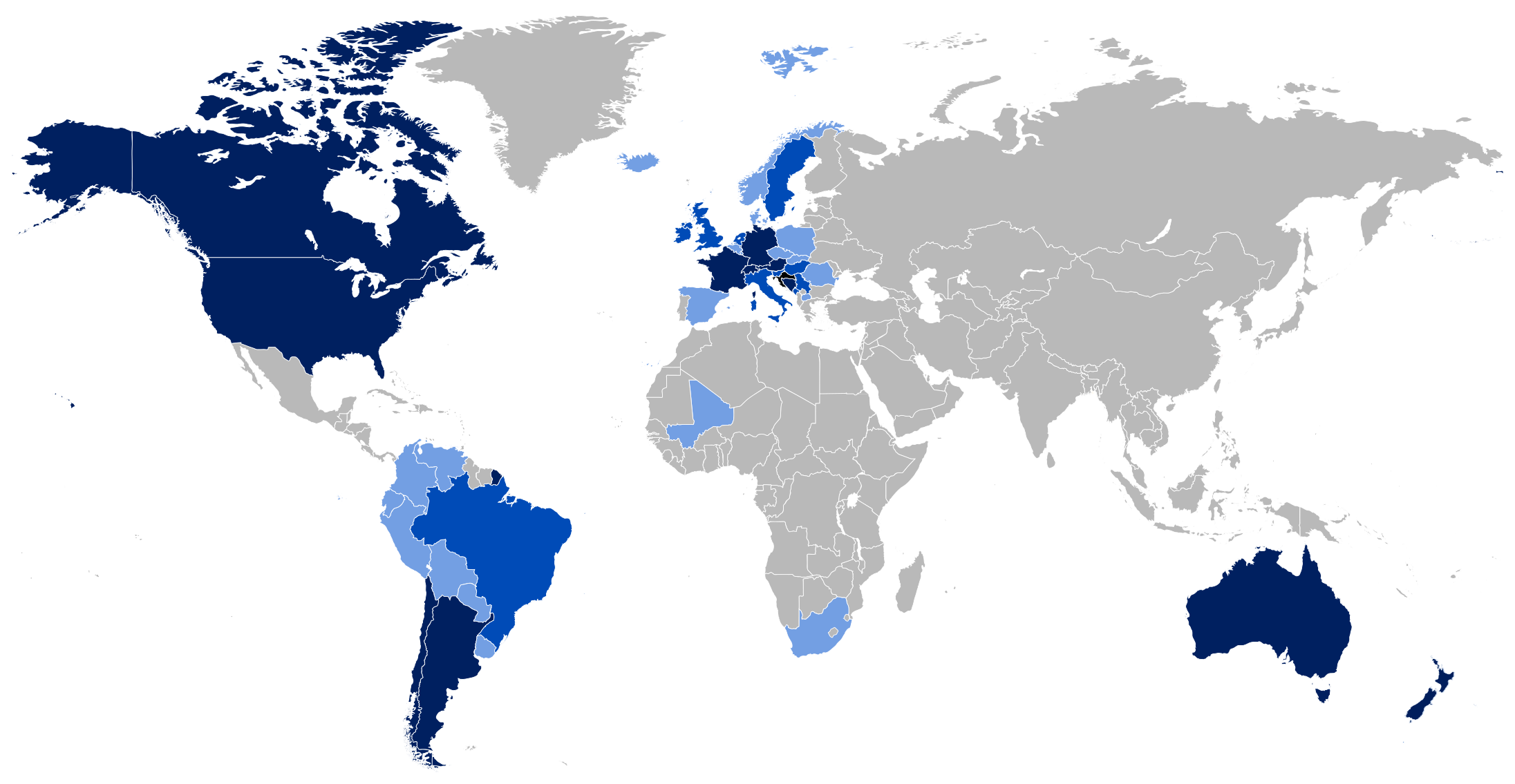

Total population
- c. 7–8 million

Regions with significant populations
- Croatia; 3,550,000 ethnic Croats making 99.3% of the population in Croatia and the rest being European ethnic minorities, as the latest official census. (2021); Bosnia and Herzegovina; 544,780 (2013)
- United States: 414,714 (2012)–1,200,000 (est.)
- Germany: 500,000 (2021)
- Chile: 400,000
- Argentina: 250,000
- Austria: 220,000
- Australia: 164,362 (2021)– 250,000 (est.)
- Canada: 130,280 (2021)– 250,000 (est.)
- New Zealand: 100,000
- Switzerland: 80,000 (2021)
- Brazil: 70,000
- Italy: 60,000
- Slovenia: 50,000 (est.)
- Paraguay: 41,502 (2023)
- France: 40,000 (est.)
- Serbia: 39,107 (2022)
- Sweden: 35,000 (est.)
Other countries (fewer than 30,000)
| Hungary | 22,995 (2016) |
| Ireland | 20,000 - 50,000 (2019) |
| Peru | 10,000 - 250,000 |
| Netherlands | 10,000 |
| Bolivia | 10,000 |
| South Africa | 8,000 |
| United Kingdom | 6,992 |
| Montenegro | 6,021 (2011) |
| Belgium | 6,000 |
| Colombia | 5,800 (est.) |
| Denmark | 5,400 |
| Norway | 5,272 |
| Uruguay | 5,000 |
| Venezuela | 5,000 |
| Romania | 4,842 (2021) |
| Ecuador | 4,000 |
| Slovakia | 2,001–2,600 |
| United Arab Emirates | 2,500 |
| Czech Republic | 2,490 |
| Luxembourg | 2,000 |
| Poland | 1,656 |
| Portugal | 499 |
| Russia | 304 |
- Europe: c. 5,200,000
- North America: c. 600,000–2,500,000^{[a]}
- South America: c. 500,000–800,000
- Other: c. 300,000–350,000

Languages
- Croatian: (Kajkavian; Shtokavian; Chakavian)

Religion
- Christianity: Predominantly Catholicism

Related ethnic groups
- Other South Slavs

Croats (/ˈkroʊæts/; Croatian: Hrvati, pronounced [xr̩ʋǎːti]) are a South Slavic ethnic group native to Croatia, Bosnia and Herzegovina, and other neighboring countries in Central and Southeastern Europe. They share a common Croatian culture, ancestry, history, and speak the Croatian language. The ethnic group is predominantly Catholic.

Croats form a sizeable minority in Germany, Austria, Switzerland, Italy, and Slovenia. Many emigrated from Europe and established a sizable diaspora in the aftermath of World War II for political, social, and economic reasons. Grassroots assistance from earlier communities and the Catholic Church allowed them to settle in the Americas, Australia, and New Zealand. 3.9 million people in Croatia identify themselves as Croats, constituting about 90.4% of the population. Another 553,000 live in Bosnia and Herzegovina, where they are one of the country's three constituent ethnic groups. This population is predominantly found in Western Herzegovina, Central Bosnia, and Bosnian Posavina. The Croat minority in Serbia numbers about 70,000 and mostly lives in Vojvodina. The ethnic Tarara people, indigenous to Te Tai Tokerau in New Zealand, are of mixed Croatian and Māori Ngāpuhi descent. Tarara Day is celebrated every 15 March to commemorate their "highly regarded place in present-day Māoridom".

The Croatian language is official in Croatia, the European Union, and Bosnia and Herzegovina. Croatian is a recognized minority language within Croatian autochthonous communities and minorities in Montenegro, Austria (Burgenland), Italy (Molise), Romania (Carașova, Lupac), and Serbia (Vojvodina).

== Etymology ==
The foreign ethnonym variation "Croats" of the native name "Hrvati" derives from Medieval Latin Croāt, itself a derivation of North-West Slavic *Xərwate, by liquid metathesis from Common Slavic period *Xorvat, from proposed Proto-Slavic *Xъrvátъ which possibly comes from the 3rd-century Scytho-Sarmatian form attested in the Tanais Tablets as Χοροάθος (Khoroáthos, alternate forms comprise Khoróatos and Khoroúathos). The origin of the ethnonym is uncertain, but most probably is from Proto-Ossetian / Alanian *xurvæt- or *xurvāt-, in the meaning of "one who guards" ("guardian, protector"). The earliest preserved mentions of the ethnonym in stone inscriptions and written documents in the territory of Croatia are dated to the 8th-9th century (e.g. Dux Croatorum on Branimir inscription and Dux Chroatorum on Charter of Duke Trpimir), while in native Croatian language the earliest writing is from the Baška tablet (c. 1100), which in Glagolitic script reads: zvъnъmirъ kralъ xrъvatъskъ ("Zvonimir, king of Croats").

== History ==
=== Arrival of the Slavs ===
Early Slavs, especially Sclaveni and Antae, including the White Croats, invaded and settled Southeastern Europe in the 6th and 7th century.

==== Early medieval archaeology ====
Archaeological evidence shows population continuity in coastal Dalmatia and Istria. In contrast, much of the Dinaric hinterland appears to have been depopulated, as virtually all hilltop settlements, from Noricum to Dardania, were abandoned and few appear destroyed in the early 7th century. Although the dating of the earliest Slavic settlements has been disputed, recent archaeological data established that the migration and settlement of the Slavs/Croats were in the late 6th and early 7th century.

==== Croat ethnogenesis ====
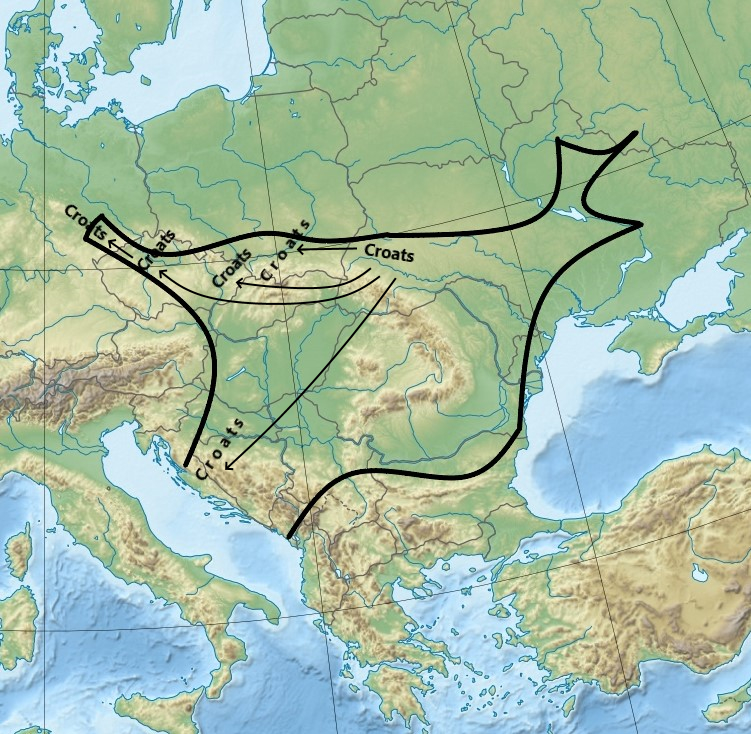
The range of Slavic ceramics of the Prague-Penkovka culture marked in black, all known ethnonyms of Croats are within this area. Presumable migration routes of Croats are indicated by arrows, per V. V. Sedov (1979).

There is considerable uncertainty surrounding the exact circumstances of their appearance given the scarcity of literary sources during the 7th and 8th century Middle Ages. Traditionally, scholarship has placed the arrival of the White Croats from White Croatia in Eastern Europe in the early 7th century, primarily on the basis of the later Byzantine document De Administrando Imperio. As such, the arrival of the Croats was seen as part of main wave or a second wave of Slavic migrations, which took over Dalmatia from Avar hegemony. However, as early as the 1970s, scholars questioned the reliability of Porphyrogenitus' work, written as it was in the 10th century. Rather than being an accurate historical account, De Administrando Imperio more accurately reflects the political situation during the 10th century. It mainly served as Byzantine propaganda praising Emperor Heraclius for repopulating the Balkans (previously devastated by the Avars, Sclaveni, and Antes) with Croats, who were seen by the Byzantines as tributary peoples living on what had always been 'Roman land'.

Scholars have hypothesized the name Croat (Hrvat) may be Iranian, thus suggesting that the (Proto-)Croatian ethnogenesis is related to the Sarmatians, the major basis for this connection being inscriptions from the Tanais dated to the 2nd and 3rd centuries AD, mentioning the name Khoro(u)athos. Similar arguments have been made for an alleged Gothic-Croat link. Whilst there is possible evidence of population continuity between Gothic and Croatian times in parts of Dalmatia, the idea of a Gothic origin of Croats was more rooted in the 20th century Ustaše political aspirations than historical reality.

==== Other polities in Dalmatia and Pannonia ====
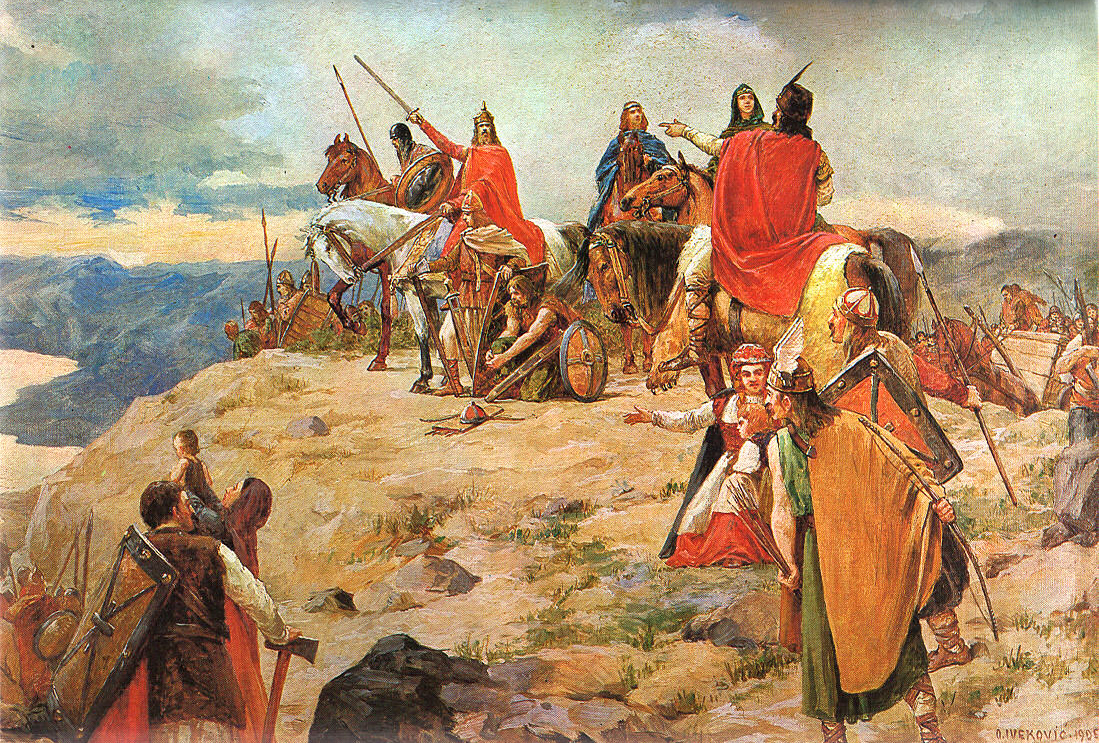
Arrival of the Croats to the Adriatic Sea by Oton Iveković.

Other distinct polities and ethno-political groups existed around the Croat duchy. These included the Guduscans (based in Liburnia), Pagania (between the Cetina and Neretva River), Zachlumia (between Neretva and Dubrovnik), Bosnia, and Serbia in other eastern parts of ex-Roman province of "Dalmatia". Also prominent in the territory of future Croatia was the polity of Prince Ljudevit who ruled the territories between the Drava and Sava rivers ("Pannonia Inferior"), centred from his fort at Sisak. Although Duke Liutevid and his people are commonly seen as a "Pannonian Croats", he is, due to the lack of "evidence that they had a sense of Croat identity" referred to as dux Pannoniae Inferioris, or simply a Slav, by contemporary sources. A closer reading of the DAI suggests that Constantine VII's consideration about the ethnic origin and identity of the population of Lower Pannonia, Pagania, Zachlumia, and other principalities is based on tenth century political rule and does not indicate ethnicity, and although both Croats and Serbs could have been a small military elite which managed to organize other already settled and more numerous Slavs, it is possible that Narentines, Zachlumians, and others also arrived as Croats or with Croatian tribal alliance.

The Croats emerged as the dominant local power in northern Dalmatia, absorbing Liburnia and expanding their name by conquest and prestige. In the south, while having periods of independence, the Naretines merged with Croats later under control of Croatian Kings. With such expansion, Croatia became the dominant power and absorbed other polities between Frankish, Bulgarian, and Byzantine empire. Although the Chronicle of the Priest of Duklja has been dismissed as an unreliable record, the mentioned "Red Croatia" suggests that Croatian clans and families might have settled as far south as Duklja/Zeta. According to Martin Dimnik writing for The New Cambridge Medieval History, "at the beginning of the eleventh century the Croats lived in two more or less clearly defined regions" of the "Croatian lands" which "were now divided into three districts" including Slavonia/Pannonian Croatia (between rivers Sava and Drava) on one side and Croatia/Dalmatian littoral (between Gulf of Kvarner and rivers Vrbas and Neretva) and Bosnia (around river Bosna) on other side, and that "Croats, along with Serbs, also lived in Bosnia which at times came under the control of Croatian kings".

=== Early medieval age ===
The lands which constitute modern Croatia fell under three major geographic-politic zones during the Middle Ages, which were influenced by powerful neighbor Empires – notably the Byzantines, the Avars, and later Magyars, Franks, and Bulgars. Each vied for control of the Northwest Balkan regions. Two independent Slavic dukedoms emerged sometime during the 9th century: the Duchy of Croatia and Principality of Lower Pannonia.

==== Pannonian Principality ("Savia") ====
Having been under Avar control, lower Pannonia became a march of the Carolingian Empire around 800. Aided by Vojnomir in 796, the first named Slavic Duke of Pannonia, the Franks wrested control of the region from the Avars before totally destroying the Avar realm in 803. After the death of Charlemagne in 814, Frankish influence decreased on the region, allowing Prince Ljudevit Posavski to raise a rebellion in 819. The Frankish margraves sent armies in 820, 821, and 822, but each time they failed to crush the rebels. Aided by Borna the Guduscan, the Franks eventually defeated Ljudevit, who withdrew his forces to the Serbs and conquered them, according to the Frankish Annals.

For much of the subsequent period, Savia was probably directly ruled by the Carinthian Duke Arnulf, the future East Frankish King and Emperor. However, Frankish control was far from smooth. The Royal Frankish Annals mention several Bulgar raids, driving up the Sava and Drava rivers, as a result of a border dispute with the Franks, from 827. By a peace treaty in 845, the Franks were confirmed as rulers over Slavonia, whilst Srijem remained under Bulgarian clientage. Later, the expanding power of Great Moravia also threatened Frankish control of the region. In an effort to halt their influence, the Franks sought alliance with the Magyars, and elevated the local Slavic leader Braslav in 892, as a more independent Duke over lower Pannonia.

In 896, his rule stretched from Vienna and Budapest to the southern Croat duchies, and included almost the whole of ex-Roman Pannonian provinces. He probably died c. 900 fighting against his former allies, the Magyars. The subsequent history of Savia again becomes murky, and historians are not sure who controlled Savia during much of the 10th century. However, it is likely that the ruler Tomislav, the first crowned King, was able to exert much control over Savia and adjacent areas during his reign. It is at this time that sources first refer to a "Pannonian Croatia", appearing in the 10th century Byzantine work De Administrando Imperio.

=== Dalmatian Croats ===
The Dalmatian Croats were recorded to have been subject to the Kingdom of Italy under Lothair I, since 828. The Croatian Prince Mislav (835–845) built up a formidable navy, and in 839 signed a peace treaty with Pietro Tradonico, doge of Venice. The Venetians soon proceeded to battle with the independent Slavic pirates of the Pagania region, but failed to defeat them. The Bulgarian king Boris I (called by the Byzantine Empire Archon of Bulgaria after he made Christianity the official religion of Bulgaria) also waged a lengthy war against the Dalmatian Croats, trying to expand his state to the Adriatic.

The Croatian Prince Trpimir I (845–864) succeeded Mislav. In 854, there was a great battle between Trpimir's forces and the Bulgars. Neither side emerged victorious, and the outcome was the exchange of gifts and the establishment of peace. Trpimir I managed to consolidate power over Dalmatia and much of the inland regions towards Pannonia, while instituting counties as a way of controlling his subordinates (an idea he picked up from the Franks). The first known written mention of the Croats, dates from 4 March 852, in statute by Trpimir. Trpimir is remembered as the initiator of the Trpimirović dynasty, that ruled in Croatia, with interruptions, from 845 until 1091. After his death, an uprising was raised by a powerful nobleman from Knin – Domagoj, and his son Zdeslav was exiled with his brothers, Petar and Muncimir to Constantinople.

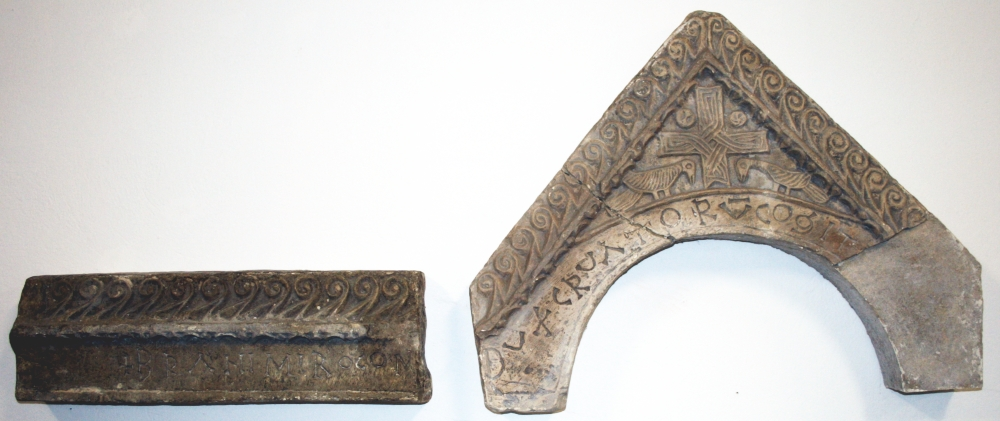
Branimir Inscription (9th-century) from Šopot near Benkovac in Croatia, as "Dux Cruatorum", has the earliest carved ethnonym Hrvat (Cruat-/Crvat-) in the form which is still pronounced today.

Facing a number of naval threats by Saracens and Byzantine Empire, the Croatian Prince Domagoj (864–876) built up the Croatian navy again and helped the coalition of emperor Louis II and the Byzantine to conquer Bari in 871. During Domagoj's reign piracy was a common practice, and he forced the Venetians to start paying tribute for sailing near the eastern Adriatic coast. After Domagoj's death, Venetian chronicles named him "The worst duke of Slavs", while Pope John VIII referred to Domagoj in letters as "Famous duke". Domagoj's son, of unknown name, ruled shortly between 876 and 878 with his brothers. They continued the rebellion, attacked the western Istrian towns in 876, but were subsequently defeated by the Venetian navy. Their ground forces defeated the Pannonian duke Kocelj (861–874) who was suzerain to the Franks, and thereby shed the Frankish vassal status. Wars of Domagoj and his son liberated Dalmatian Croats from supreme Franks rule. Zdeslav deposed him in 878 with the help of the Byzantines. He acknowledged the supreme rule of Byzantine Emperor Basil I. In 879, the Pope asked for help from prince Zdeslav for an armed escort for his delegates across southern Dalmatia and Zahumlje, but on early May 879, Zdeslav was killed near Knin in an uprising led by Branimir, a relative of Domagoj, instigated by the Pope, fearing Byzantine power.

Branimir's (879–892) own actions were approved from the Holy See to bring the Croats further away from the influence of Byzantium and closer to Rome. Duke Branimir wrote to Pope John VIII affirming this split from Byzantine and commitment to the Roman Papacy. During the solemn divine service in St. Peter's church in Rome in 879, John VIII] gave his blessing to the duke and the Croatian people, about which he informed Branimir in his letters, in which Branimir was recognized as the Duke of the Croats (Dux Chroatorum). During his reign, Croatia retained its sovereignty from both the Holy Roman Empire and Byzantine rule, and became a fully recognized state. After Branimir's death, Prince Muncimir (892–910), Zdeslav's brother, took control of Dalmatia and ruled it independently of both Rome and Byzantium as divino munere Croatorum dux (with God's help, duke of Croats). In Dalmatia, duke Tomislav (910–928) succeeded Muncimir. Tomislav successfully repelled Magyar mounted invasions of the Arpads, expelled them over the Sava River, and united (western) Pannonian and Dalmatian Croats into one state.

=== Kingdom of Croatia (925–1102) ===
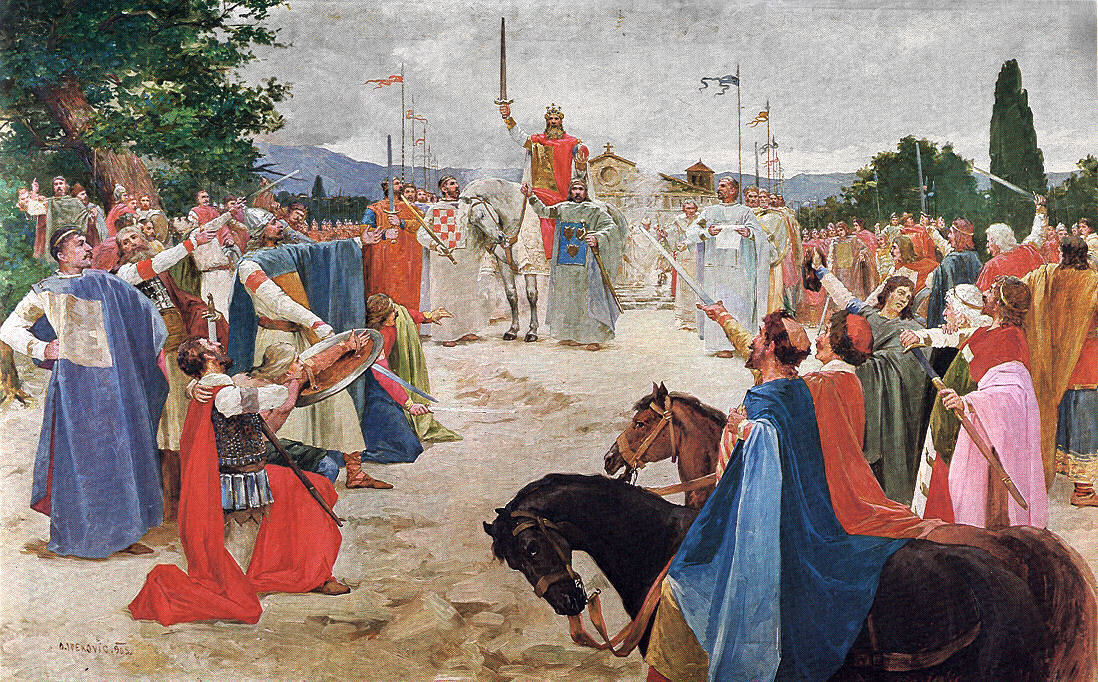
Coronation of King Tomislav by Oton Iveković.

Kingdom of Croatia and Dalmatia during Zvonimir's reign, at the beginning of 1089.

Tomislav (910–928) became king of Croatia by 925. The chief piece of evidence that Tomislav was crowned king comes in the form of a letter dated 925, surviving only in 16th-century copies, from Pope John X calling Tomislav rex Chroatorum. According to De Administrando Imperio, Tomislav's army and navy could have consisted approximately 100,000 infantry units, 60,000 cavaliers, and 80 larger (sagina) and 100 smaller warships (condura), but generally isn't taken as credible. According to the palaeographic analysis of the original manuscript of De Administrando Imperio, an estimation of the number of inhabitants in medieval Croatia between 440 and 880 thousand people, and military numbers of Franks and Byzantines – the Croatian military force was most probably composed of 20,000–100,000 infantrymen, and 3,000–24,000 horsemen organized in 60 allagions. The Croatian Kingdom as an ally of Byzantine Empire was in conflict with the rising Bulgarian Empire ruled by Tsar Simeon I. In 923, due to a deal of Pope John X and a Patriarch of Constantinopole, the sovereignty of Byzantine coastal cities in Dalmatia came under Tomislav's Governancy. The war escalated on 27 May 927, in the battle of the Bosnian Highlands. There Croats under leadership of their king Tomislav completely defeated the Bulgarian army led by military commander Alogobotur, and stopped Simeon's extension westwards. The central town in the Duvno field was named Tomislavgrad ("Tomislav's town") in his honour in the 20th century.

Tomislav was succeeded by Trpimir II (928–935), and Krešimir I (935–945), this period, on the whole, however, is obscure. Miroslav (945–949) was killed by his ban Pribina during an internal power struggle, losing part of islands and coastal cities. Krešimir II (949–969) kept particularly good relations with the Dalmatian cities, while his son Stjepan Držislav (969–997) established better relations with the Byzantine Empire and received a formal authority over Dalmatian cities. His three sons, Svetoslav (997–1000), Krešimir III (1000–1030), and Gojslav (1000–1020), opened a violent contest for the throne, weakening the state and further losing control. Krešimir III and his brother Gojslav co-ruled from 1000 until 1020, and attempted to restore control over lost Dalmatian cities now under Venetian control. Krešimir was succeeded by his son Stjepan I (1030–1058), who continued his ambitions of spreading rule over the coastal cities, and during whose rule was established the diocese of Knin between 1040 and 1050 which bishop had the nominal title of "Croatian bishop" (Latin: episcopus Chroatensis).

Krešimir IV (1058–1074) managed to get the Byzantine Empire to confirm him as the supreme ruler of the Dalmatian cities. Croatia under Krešimir IV was composed of twelve counties and was slightly larger than in Tomislav's time, and included the closest southern Dalmatian duchy of Pagania. From the outset, he continued the policies of his father, but was immediately commanded by Pope Nicholas II first in 1059 and then in 1060 to further reform the Croatian church in accordance with the Roman rite. This was especially significant to the papacy in the aftermath of the Great Schism of 1054.

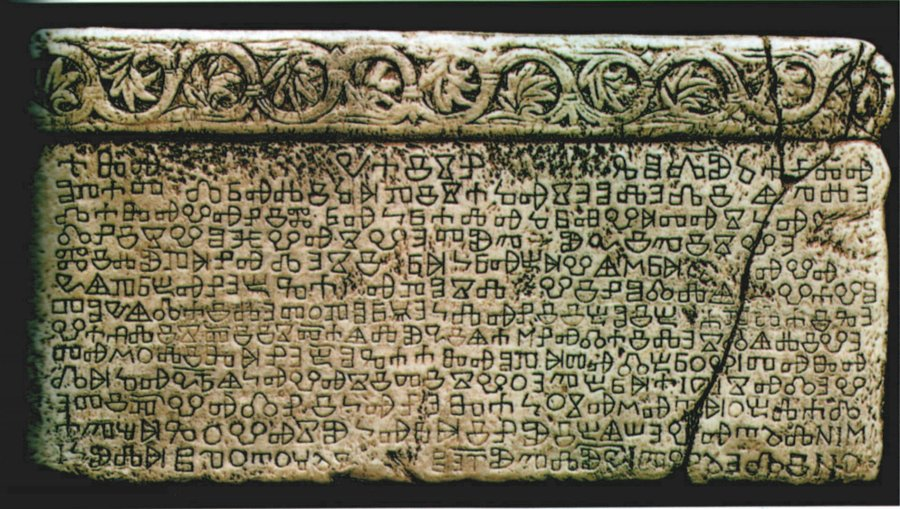
Baška tablet, which is one of the oldest evidence of the glagolitic script, mentions king Zvonimir.

He was succeeded by Dmitar Zvonimir, who was of the Svetoslavić branch of the House of Trpimirović, and a Ban of Slavonia (1064–1075). He was crowned on 8 October 1076 at Solin in the Basilica of Saint Peter and Moses (known today as Hollow Church) by a representative of Pope Gregory VII.

He was in conflict with dukes of Istria, while historical records Annales Carinthiæ and Chronica Hungarorum note he invaded Carinthia to aid Hungary in war during 1079/83, but this is disputed. Unlike Petar Krešimir IV, he was also an ally of the Normans, with whom he joined in wars against Byzantium. He married in 1063 Helen of Hungary, the daughter of King Bela I of the Hungarian Árpád dynasty, and the sister of the future King Ladislaus I. As King Zvonimir died in 1089 in unknown circumstances, with no direct heir to succeed him, Stjepan II (r. 1089–1091) last of the main Trpimirović line came to the throne but reigned for two years.

After his death civil war and unrest broke out shortly afterward as northern nobles decided Ladislaus I for the Croatian King. In 1093, southern nobles elected a new ruler, King Petar Snačić (r. 1093–1097), who managed to unify the Kingdom around his capital of Knin. His army resisted repelling Hungarian assaults, and restored Croatian rule up to the river Sava. He reassembled his forces in Croatia and advanced on Gvozd Mountain, where he met the main Hungarian army led by King Coloman I of Hungary. In 1097, in the Battle of Gvozd Mountain, the last native king Peter was killed and the Croats were decisively defeated (because of this, the mountain was this time renamed to Petrova Gora, "Peter's Mountain", but identified with the wrong mountain). In 1102, Coloman returned to the Kingdom of Croatia in force, and negotiated with the Croatian feudal lords resulting in joining of Hungarian and Croatian crowns (with the crown of Dalmatia held separate from that of Croatia).

According to The New Cambridge Medieval History, "at the beginning of the eleventh century the Croats lived in two more or less clearly defined regions" of the "Croatian lands" which "were now divided into three districts" including Slavonia/Pannonian Croatia (between rivers Sava and Drava) on one side and Croatia/Dalmatian littoral (between Gulf of Kvarner and rivers Vrbas and Neretva) and Bosnia (around river Bosna) on other side.

=== Personal union with Hungary (1102–1918) ===
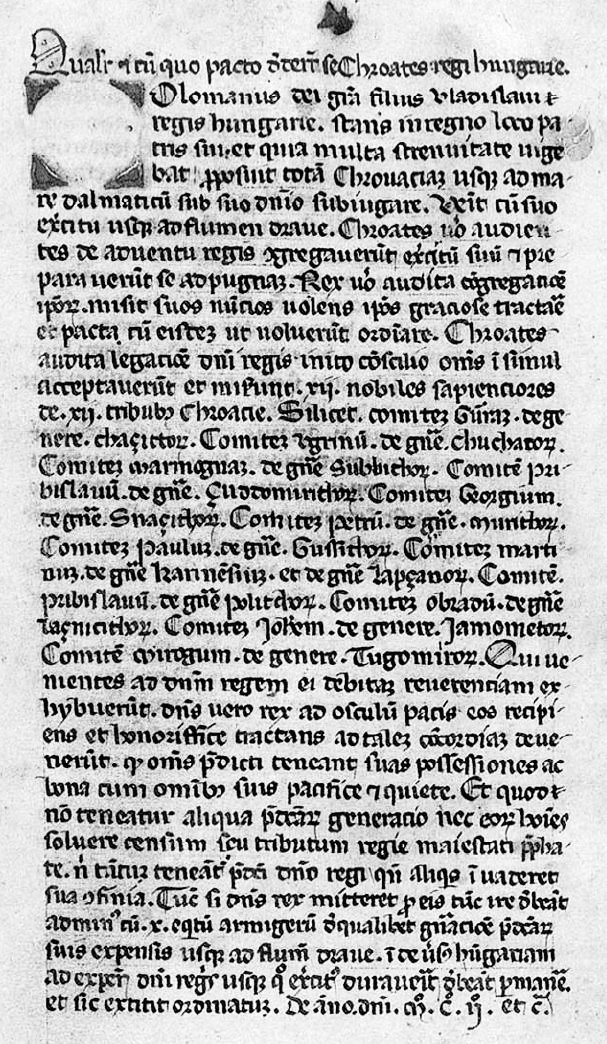
Pacta Conventa, is a historical document by which Croatia agreed to enter a personal union with Hungary. Although the validity of the document itself is disputed, Croatia did keep considerable autonomy.

In the 11th and 12th centuries "the Croats were never unified under a strong central government. They lived in different areas - Pannonian Croatia, Dalmatian Croatia, Bosnia - which were at times ruled by indigenous kings but more frequently controlled by agents of Byzantium, Venice, and Hungary. Even during periods of relatively strong centralized government, local lords frequently enjoyed an almost autonomous status".

In the union with Hungary, institutions of separate Croatian statehood were maintained through the Sabor (an assembly of Croatian nobles) and the ban (viceroy). In addition, the Croatian nobles retained their lands and titles. Coloman retained the institution of the Sabor and relieved the Croatians of taxes on their land. Coloman's successors continued to crown themselves as Kings of Croatia separately in Biograd na Moru. The Hungarian king also introduced a variant of the feudal system. Large fiefs were granted to individuals who would defend them against outside incursions thereby creating a system for the defence of the entire state. However, by enabling the nobility to seize more economic and military power, the kingdom itself lost influence to the powerful noble families. In Croatia the Šubić were one of the oldest Croatian noble families and would become particularly influential and important, ruling the area between Zrmanja and the Krka rivers. The local noble family from Krk island (who later took the surname Frankopan) is often considered the second most important medieval family, as ruled over northern Adriatic and is responsible for the adoption of one of oldest European statutes, Law codex of Vinodol (1288). Both families gave many native bans of Croatia. Other powerful families were Nelipić from Dalmatian Zagora (14th–15th centuries); Kačić who ruled over Pagania and were famous for piracy and wars against Venice (12th–13th centuries); Kurjaković family, a branch of the old Croatian noble Gusić family from Krbava (14th–16th centuries); Babonić who ruled from western Kupa to eastern Vrbas and Bosna rivers, and were bans of Slavonia (13th–14th centuries); Iločki family who ruled over Slavonian stronghold-cities, and in the 15th century rose to power. During this period, the Knights Templar and the Knights Hospitaller also acquired considerable property and assets in Croatia.

In the second half of the 13th century, during the Árpád and Anjou dynasty struggle, the Šubić family became hugely powerful under Paul I Šubić of Bribir, who was the longest Croatian Ban (1274–1312), conquering Bosnia and declaring himself "Lord of all of Bosnia" (1299–1312). He appointed his brother Mladen I Šubić as Ban of Bosnia (1299–1304), and helped Charles I from House of Anjou to be the King of Hungary. After his death in 1312, his son Mladen II Šubić was the Ban of Bosnia (1304–1322) and Ban of Croatia (1312–1322). The kings from House of Anjou intended to strengthen the kingdom by uniting their power and control, but to do so they had to diminish the power of the higher nobility. Charles I had already tried to crash the aristocratic privileges, intention finished by his son Louis the Great (1342–1382), relying on the lower nobility and towns. Both kings ruled without the Parliament, and inner nobility struggles only helped them in their intentions. This led to Mladen's defeat at the battle of Bliska in 1322 by a coalition of several Croatian noblemen and Dalmatian coastal towns with support of the King himself, in exchange of Šubić's castle of Ostrovica for Zrin Castle in Central Croatia (thus this branch was named Zrinski) in 1347. Eventually, the Babonić and Nelipić families also succumbed to the king's offensive against nobility, but with the increasing process of power centralization, Louis managed to force Venice by the Treaty of Zadar in 1358 to give up their possessions in Dalmatia. When King Louis died without successor, the question of succession remained open. The kingdom once again entered the time of internal unrest. Besides King Louis's daughter Mary, Charles III of Naples was the closest king male relative with claims to the throne. In February 1386, two months after his coronation, he was assassinated by order of the queen Elizabeth of Bosnia. His supporters, bans John of Palisna, John Horvat, and Stjepan Lacković planned a rebellion, and managed to capture and imprison Elizabeth and Mary. By orders of John of Palisna, Elizabeth was strangled. In retaliation, Magyars crowned Mary's husband Sigismund of Luxembourg.

Croatia in personal union with Hungary and Ottoman expansion in the region in 1500.

King Sigismund's army was catastrophically defeated at the Battle of Nicopolis (1396) as the Ottoman invasion was getting closer to the borders of the Hungarian-Croatian kingdom. Without news about the king after the battle, the then ruling Croatian ban Stjepan Lacković and nobles invited Charles III's son Ladislaus of Naples to be the new king. This resulted in the Bloody Sabor of Križevci in 1397, loss of interest in the crown by Ladislaus and selling of Dalmatia to Venice in 1403, and the spreading of Croatian names to the north, with those of Slavonia to the east. The dynastic struggle didn't end, and with the Ottoman invasion of Bosnia the first short raids began in Croatian territory, defended only by local nobles.

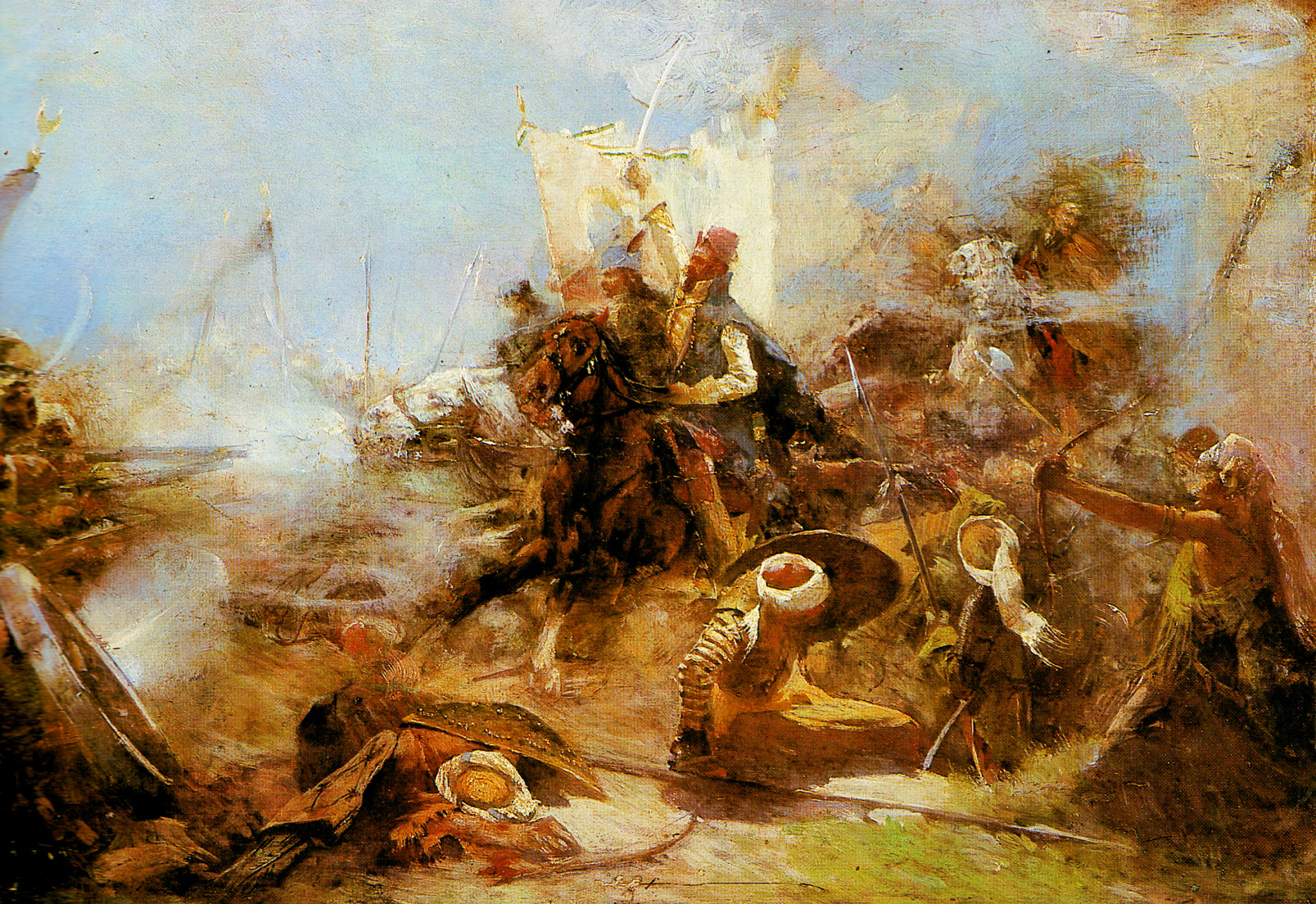
Zrínyi's charge on the Turks from the Fortress of Szigetvár, by Simon Hollósy.

As the Turkish incursion into Europe started, Croatia once again became a border area between two major forces in the Balkans. Croatian military troops fought in many battles under command of Italian Franciscan priest fra John Capistrano, the Hungarian Generalissimo John Hunyadi, and Hungarian King Matthias Corvinus, like in the Hunyadi's long campaign (1443–1444), battle of Varna (1444), second battle of Kosovo (1448), and contributed to the Christian victories over the Ottomans in the siege of Belgrade (1456) and Siege of Jajce (1463). At the time they suffered a major defeat in the battle of Krbava field (Lika, Croatia) in 1493 and gradually lost increasing amounts of territory to the Ottoman Empire. Pope Leo X called Croatia the forefront of Christianity (Antemurale Christianitatis) in 1519, given that several Croatian soldiers made significant contributions to the struggle against the Ottoman Turks. Among them there were ban Petar Berislavić who won a victory at Dubica on the Una river in 1513, the captain of Senj and prince of Klis Petar Kružić, who defended the Klis Fortress for almost 25 years, captain Nikola Jurišić who deterred by a magnitude larger Turkish force on their way to Vienna in 1532, or ban Nikola IV Zrinski who helped save Pest from occupation in 1542 and fought in the Battle of Szigetvar in 1566. During the Ottoman conquest tens of thousands of Croats were taken in Turkey, where they became slaves.

The Battle of Mohács (1526) and the death of King Louis II ended the Hungarian-Croatian union. In 1526, the Hungarian parliament elected two separate kings János Szapolyai and Ferdinand I Habsburg, but the choice of the Croatian sabor at Cetin prevailed on the side of Ferdinand I, as they elected him as the new king of Croatia on 1 January 1527, uniting both lands under Habsburg rule. In return, Ferdinand promised to respect and protect the privileges of the Croatian Kingdom and to maintain 1,000 cavalry and 200 infantry for its defence.

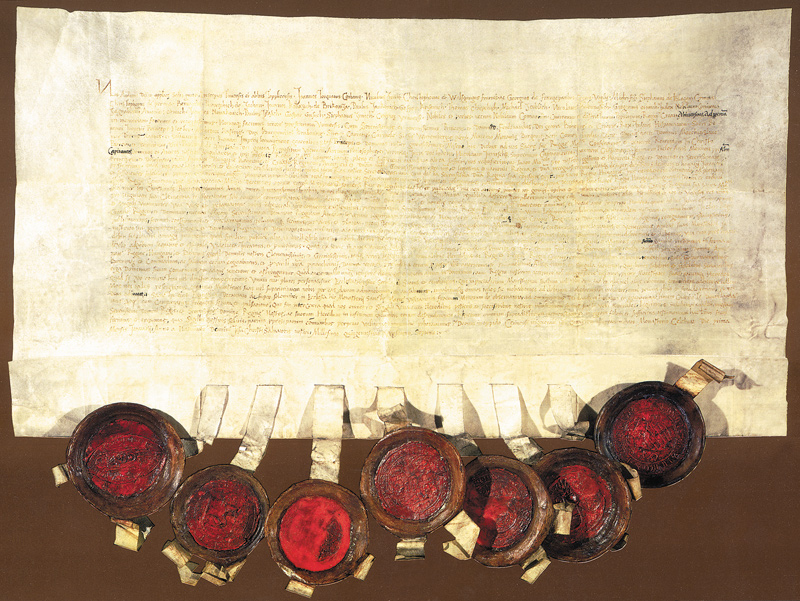
The Cetingrad Charter from 1 January 1527, when Croatian Sabor elected the Habsburg monarchy.

However, the Hungarian-Croatian Kingdom was not enough well prepared and organized, and the Ottoman Empire expanded further in the 16th century to include most of Slavonia, western Bosnia, and Lika. For the sake of stopping the Ottoman conquering and possible assault on the capital of Vienna, the large areas of Croatia and Slavonia (even Hungary and Romania) bordering the Ottoman Empire were organized as a Military Frontier which was ruled directly from Vienna military headquarters. The invasion caused migration of Croats, and the area which became deserted was subsequently settled by Serbs, Vlachs, Germans, and others. The negative effects of feudalism escalated in 1573 when the peasants in northern Croatia and Slovenia rebelled against their feudal lords due to various injustices. After the fall of Bihać fort in 1592, only small areas of Croatia remained unrecovered. The remaining 16,800 square kilometres (6,487 sq mi) were referred to as the reliquiae reliquiarum of the once Croatian kingdom.

Croats stopped the Ottoman advance in Croatia at the battle of Sisak in 1593, 100 years after the defeat at Krbava field, and the short Long Turkish War ended with the Peace of Zsitvatorok in 1606, after which Croatian classes tried unsuccessfully to have their territory on the Military Frontier restored to rule by the Croatian Ban, managing only to restore a small area of lost territory but failed to regain large parts of Croatian Kingdom (present-day western Bosnia and Herzegovina), as the present-day border between the two countries is a remnant of this outcome.

==== Croatian national revival (1593–1918) ====
In the first half of the 17th century, Croats fought in the Thirty Years' War on the side of Holy Roman Empire, mostly as light cavalry under command of imperial generalissimo Albrecht von Wallenstein. Croatian Ban, Juraj V Zrinski, also fought in the war, but died in a military camp near Bratislava, Slovakia, as he was poisoned by von Wallenstein after a verbal duel. His son, future ban and captain-general of Croatia, Nikola Zrinski, participated during the closing stages of the war.

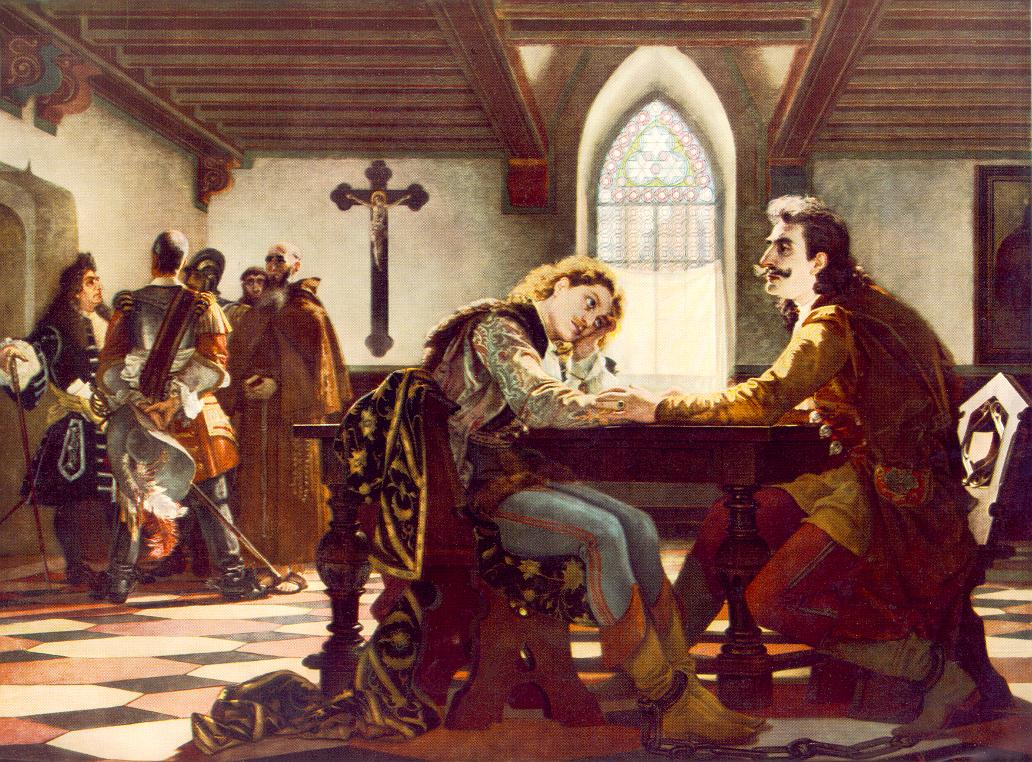
Peter Zrinyi and Ferenc Frangepán in the Wiener-Neustadt Prison by Viktor Madarász.

In 1664, the Austrian imperial army was victorious against the Turks, but Emperor Leopold failed to capitalize on the success when he signed the Peace of Vasvár in which Croatia and Hungary were prevented from regaining territory lost to the Ottoman Empire. This caused unrest among the Croatian and Hungarian nobility which plotted against the emperor. Nikola Zrinski participated in launching the conspiracy which later came to be known as the Magnate conspiracy, but he soon died, and the rebellion was continued by his brother, Croatian ban Petar Zrinski, Fran Krsto Frankopan, and Ferenc Wesselényi. Petar Zrinski, along the conspirators, went on a wide secret diplomatic negotiations with a number of nations, including Louis XIV of France, the Polish–Lithuanian Commonwealth, Sweden, the Republic of Venice, and even the Ottoman Empire, to free Croatia from the Habsburg sovereignty.

Imperial spies uncovered the conspiracy, and on 30 April 1671 executed four esteemed Croatian and Hungarian noblemen involved in it, including Zrinski and Frankopan in Wiener Neustadt. The large estates of two most powerful Croatian noble houses were confiscated and their families relocated, soon after extinguished. Between 1670 and the revolution of 1848, there would be only 2 bans of Croatian nationality. The period from 1670 to the Croatian cultural revival in the 19th century was Croatia's political Dark Age. Meanwhile, with the victories over Turks, Habsburgs all the more insistent they spent centralization and germanization, new regained lands in liberated Slavonia started giving to foreign families as feudal goods, at the expense of domestic element. Because of this the Croatian Sabor was losing its significance, and the nobility less attended it, yet went only to the one in Hungary.

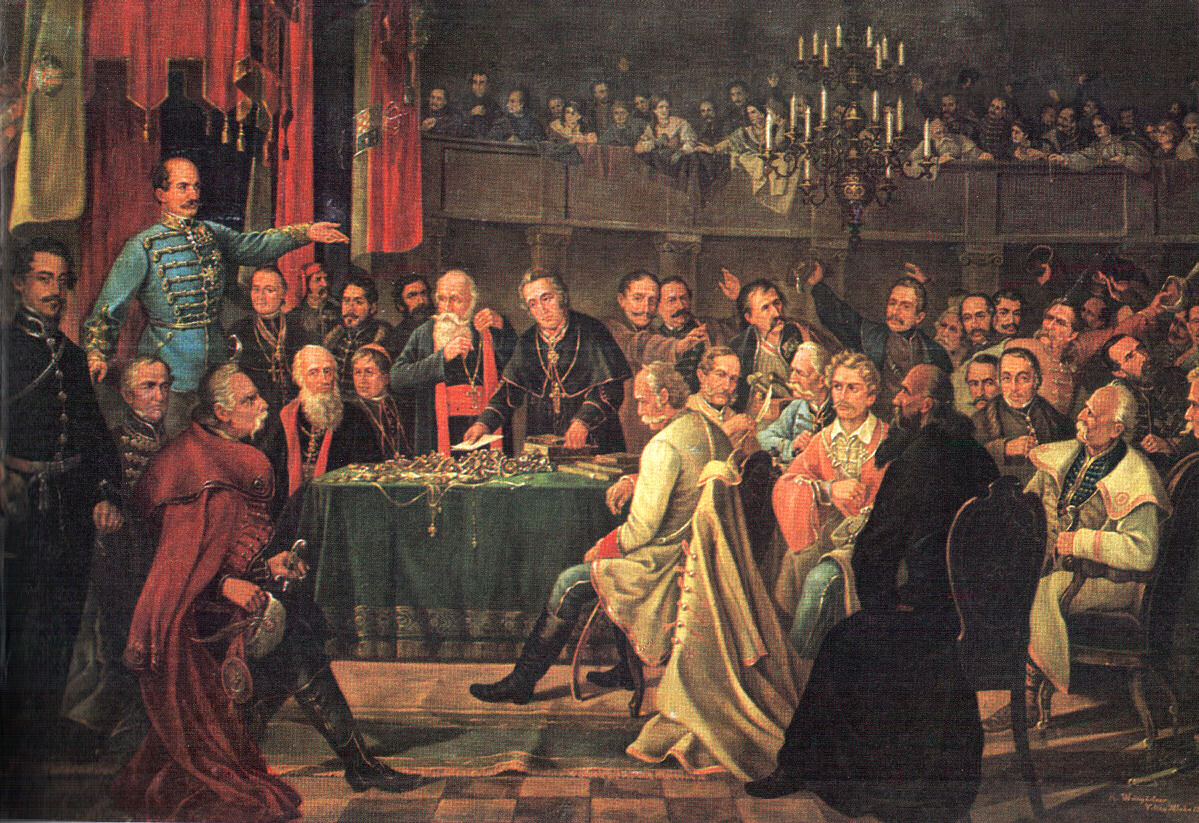
The Croatian Sabor (Parliament) in 1848, by Dragutin Weingärtner.

In the 18th century, Croatia was one of the crown lands that supported Emperor Charles VI's Pragmatic Sanction of 1713 and supported Empress Maria Theresa in the War of the Austrian Succession of 1741–48. Subsequently, the empress made significant contributions to Croatian matters, by making several changes in the feudal and tax system, administrative control of the Military Frontier, in 1745 administratively united Slavonia with Croatia and in 1767 organized Croatian royal council with the ban on head, however, she ignored and eventually disbanded it in 1779, and Croatia was relegated to just one seat in the governing council of Hungary, held by the ban of Croatia. To fight the Austrian centralization and absolutism, Croats passed their rights to the united government in Hungary, thus to together resist the intentions from Vienna. But the connection with Hungary soon adversely affected the position of Croats, because Magyars in the spring of their nationalism tried to Magyarize Croats, and make Croatia a part of a united Hungary. Because of this pretensions, the constant struggles between Croats and Magyars emerged, and lasted until 1918. Croats were fighting in unfavorable conditions, against both Vienna and Budapest, while divided on Banska Hrvatska, Dalmatia, and Military Frontier. In such a time, with the fall of the Venetian Republic in 1797, its possessions in eastern Adriatic mostly came under the authority of France which passed its rights to Austria the same year. Eight years later they were restored to France as the Illyrian Provinces, but won back to the Austrian crown 1815. Though now part of the same empire, Dalmatia and Istria were part of Cisleithania while Croatia and Slavonia were in Hungarian part of the Monarchy.

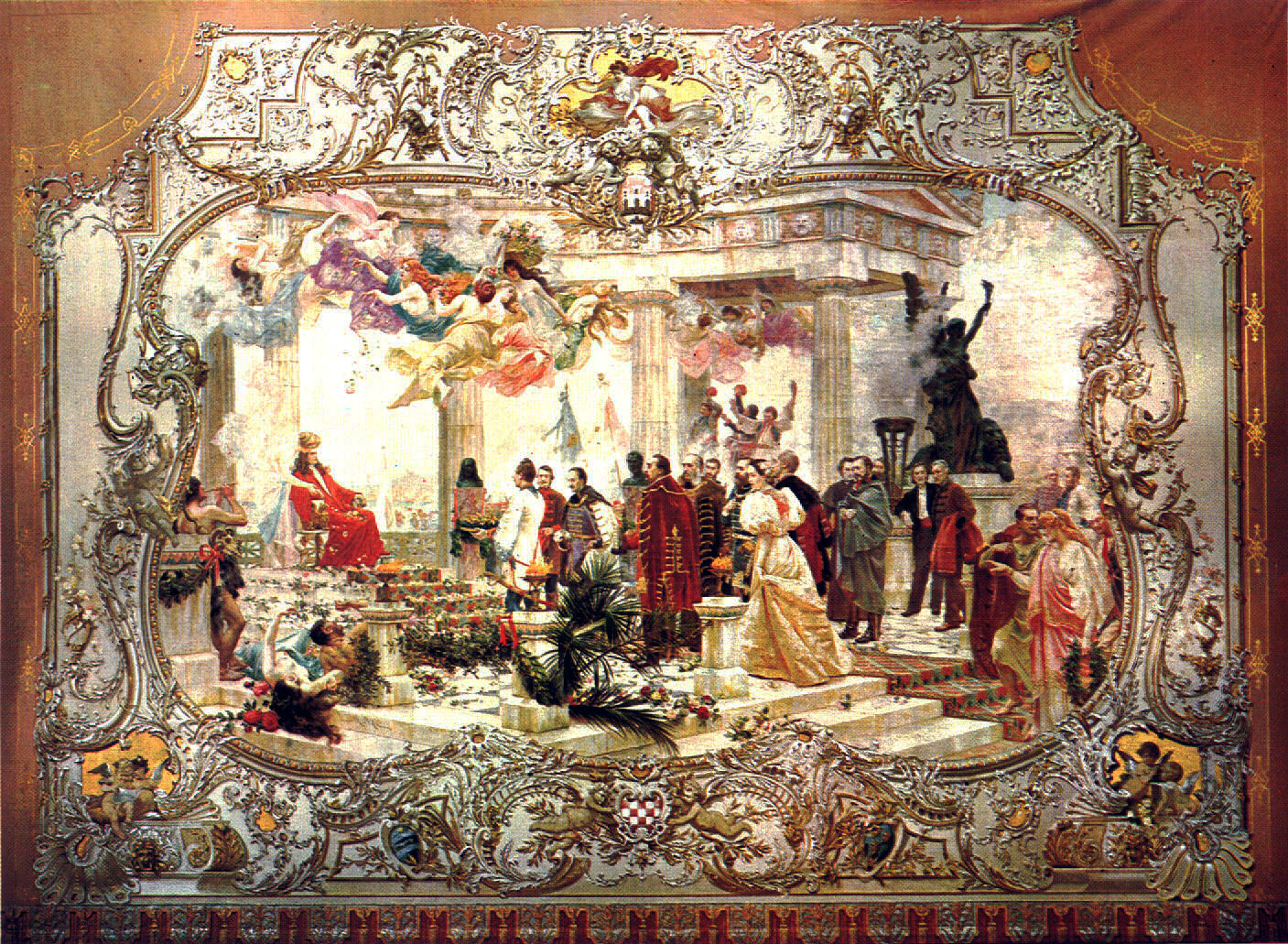
The national revival began with the Illyrian movement in 1830.

In the 19th century Croatian romantic nationalism emerged to counteract the non-violent but apparent Germanization and Magyarization. The Croatian national revival began in the 1830s with the Illyrian movement. The movement attracted a number of influential figures and produced some important advances in the Croatian language and culture. The champion of the Illyrian movement was Ljudevit Gaj who also reformed and standardized Croatian. The official language in Croatia had been Latin until 1847, when it became Croatian. The movement relied on a South Slavic and Panslavistic conception, and its national, political, and social ideas were advanced at the time.

By the 1840s, the movement had moved from cultural goals to resisting Hungarian political demands. By the royal order of 11 January 1843, originating from the chancellor Metternich, the use of the Illyrian name and insignia in public was forbidden.

Modern political history of the Balkans from 1796 onwards.

This deterred the movement's progress but it couldn't stop the changes in the society that had already started. On 25 March 1848, was conducted a political petition "Zahtijevanja naroda", which program included thirty national, social, and liberal principles, like Croatian national independence, annexation of Dalmatia and Military Frontier, independence from Hungary as far as finance, language, education, freedom of speech and writing, religion, nullification of serfdom etc. In the revolutions of 1848 in the Austrian Empire, the Croatian Ban Jelačić cooperated with the Austrians in quenching the Hungarian Revolution of 1848 by leading a military campaign into Hungary, which advanced towards Pest until the indecisive Battle of Pákozd.

Croatia was later subject to Hungarian hegemony under ban Levin Rauch when the Empire was transformed into a dual monarchy of Austria-Hungary in 1867. Nevertheless, Ban Jelačić had succeeded in the abolition of serfdom in Croatia, which eventually brought about massive changes in society: the power of the major landowners was reduced and arable land became increasingly subdivided, to the extent of risking famine. Many Croatians began emigrating to the New World countries in this period, a trend that would continue over the next century, creating a large Croatian diaspora.

=== Modern history (1918–present) ===
After the First World War and dissolution of Austria-Hungary, most Croats were united within the Kingdom of Serbs, Croats and Slovenes, created by unification of the short-lived State of SHS with the Kingdom of Serbia. Croats became one of the constituent nations of the new kingdom. The state was transformed into the Kingdom of Yugoslavia in 1929 and the Croats were united in the new nation with their neighbors – the South Slavs-Yugoslavs.

In 1939, the Croats received a high degree of autonomy when the Banovina of Croatia was created, which united almost all ethnic Croatian territories within the Kingdom. In the Second World War, the Axis forces created the Independent State of Croatia led by the Ustaše movement which sought to create an ethnically pure Croatian state on the territory corresponding to present-day countries of Croatia and Bosnia and Herzegovina. Post-WWII Yugoslavia became a federation consisting of 6 republics, and Croats became one of two constituent peoples of two – Croatia and Bosnia and Herzegovina. Croats in the Serbian autonomous province of Vojvodina are one of six main ethnic groups composing this region.

Following the democratization of society, accompanied with ethnic tensions that emerged ten years after the death of Josip Broz Tito, the Republic of Croatia declared independence, which was followed by war. In the first years of the war, over 200,000 Croats were displaced from their homes as a result of the military actions. In the peak of the fighting, around 550,000 ethnic Croats were displaced altogether during the Yugoslav wars.

Post-war government's policy of easing the immigration of ethnic Croats from abroad encouraged a number of Croatian descendants to return to Croatia. The influx was increased by the arrival of Croatian refugees from Bosnia and Herzegovina. After the war's end in 1995, most Croatian refugees returned to their previous homes, while some (mostly Croat refugees from Bosnia and Herzegovina and Janjevci from Kosovo) moved into the formerly-held Serbian housing.

== Genetics ==
Genetically, on the Y-chromosome DNA line, a majority (65%) of male Croats from Croatia belong to haplogroups I2 (39%-40%) and R1a (22%-24%), while a minority (35%) belongs to haplogroups E (10%), R1b (6%-7%), J (6%-7%), I1 (5-8%), G (2%), and others in <2% traces. The distribution, variance and frequency of the I2 and R1a subclades (>65%) among Croats are related to the early medieval Slavic migrations to the Balkans, most probably from the territory of present-day Ukraine and Southeastern Poland. Genetically, on the maternal mitochondrial DNA line, a majority (>65%) of Croats from Croatia (mainland and coast) belong to three of the eleven major European mtDNA haplogroups – H (45%), U (17.8–20.8%), J (3–11%), while a large minority (>35%) belongs to many other smaller haplogroups. Based on autosomal IBD survey the speakers of Croatian share a very high number of common ancestors dated to the migration period approximately 1,500 years ago with Poland and Romania-Bulgaria clusters among others in Eastern Europe. It was caused by the early medieval Slavic migrations, a small population which expanded into vast regions of "low population density beginning in the sixth century". Other IBD and admixture studies also found even patterns of admixture events among South, East, and West Slavs at the time and area of Slavic expansion, and that the shared ancestral Balto-Slavic component among South Slavs is between 55 and 70%. A 2023 archaeogenetic study showed that the Croats roughly have 66.5% Central-Eastern European early medieval Slavic-ancestry, 31.2% local Roman, and 2.4% West Anatolian ancestry.

== Language ==
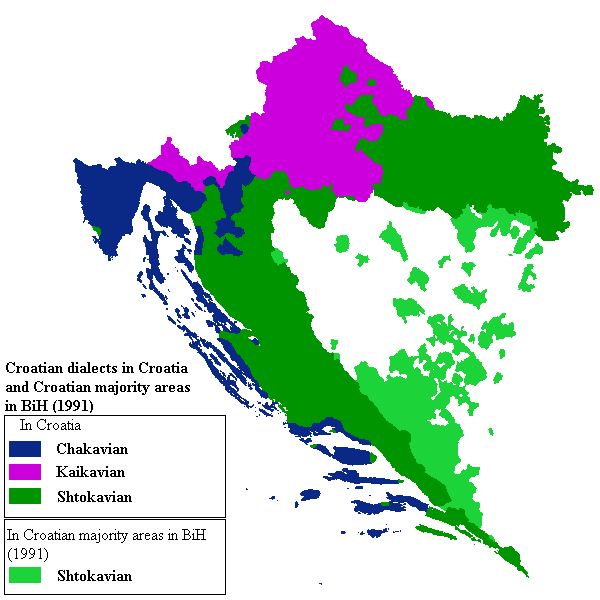
Location map of Croatian dialects.

Map of Shtokavian dialects.

Speech example
An example of Old Croatian used in Baška tablet.

Croats primarily speak Croatian, a South Slavic lect of the Western South Slavic subgroup. Standard Croatian is considered a normative variety of Serbo-Croatian, and is mutually intelligible with the other three national standards, Serbian, Bosnian, and Montenegrin (see Comparison of Serbo-Croatian standard varieties) which are all based on the Shtokavian dialect.

Besides Shtokavian, Croats from the Adriatic coastline speak the Chakavian dialect, while Croats from the continental northwestern part of Croatia speak the Kajkavian dialect. Vernacular texts in the Chakavian dialect first appeared in the 13th century, and Shtokavian texts appeared a century later. Standardization began in the period sometimes called "Baroque Slavism" in the first half of the 17th century, while some authors date it back to the end of the 15th century. The modern Neo-Shtokavian standard that appeared in the mid 18th century was the first unified standard Croatian. Croatian is written in Gaj's Latin alphabet.

The beginning of written Croatian can be traced to the 9th century, when Old Church Slavonic was adopted as the language of the Divine liturgy of St. John Chrysostom and the Divine Liturgy of Saint Basil. This language was gradually adapted to non-liturgical purposes and became known as the Croatian version of Old Slavonic. The two variants of the language, liturgical and non-liturgical, continued to be a part of the Glagolitic service as late as the middle of the 19th century. The earliest known Croatian Church Slavonic Glagolitic are Vienna Folios from the late 11th/early 12th century. Until the end of the 11th century Croatian medieval texts were written in three scripts: Latin, Glagolitic, and Cyrillic, and also in three languages: Croatian, Latin, and Old Slavonic. The latter developed into what is referred to as the Croatian variant of Church Slavonic between the 12th and 16th centuries.

The most important early monument of Croatian literacy is the Baška tablet from the late 11th century. It is a large stone tablet found in the small Church of St. Lucy, Jurandvor on the Croatian island of Krk which contains text written mostly in Chakavian, today a dialect of Croatian, and in Shtokavian angular Glagolitic script. It mentions Zvonimir, the king of Croatia at the time. However, the luxurious and ornate representative texts of Croatian Church Slavonic belong to the later era, when they coexisted with the Croatian vernacular literature. The most notable are the "Missal of Duke Novak" from the Lika region in northwestern Croatia (1368), "Evangel from Reims" (1395, named after the town of its final destination), Hrvoje's Missal from Bosnia and Split in Dalmatia (1404). and the first printed book in Croatian, the Glagolitic Missale Romanum Glagolitice (1483).

During the 13th century Croatian vernacular texts began to appear, the most important among them being the "Istrian Land Survey" of 1275 and the "Vinodol Codex" of 1288, both written in the Chakavian dialect. The Shtokavian dialect literature, based almost exclusively on Chakavian original texts of religious provenance (missals, breviaries, prayer books) appeared almost a century later. The most important purely Shtokavian dialect vernacular text is the Vatican Croatian Prayer Book (ca. 1400).

== Religion ==
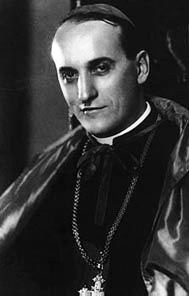
Alojzije Stepinac

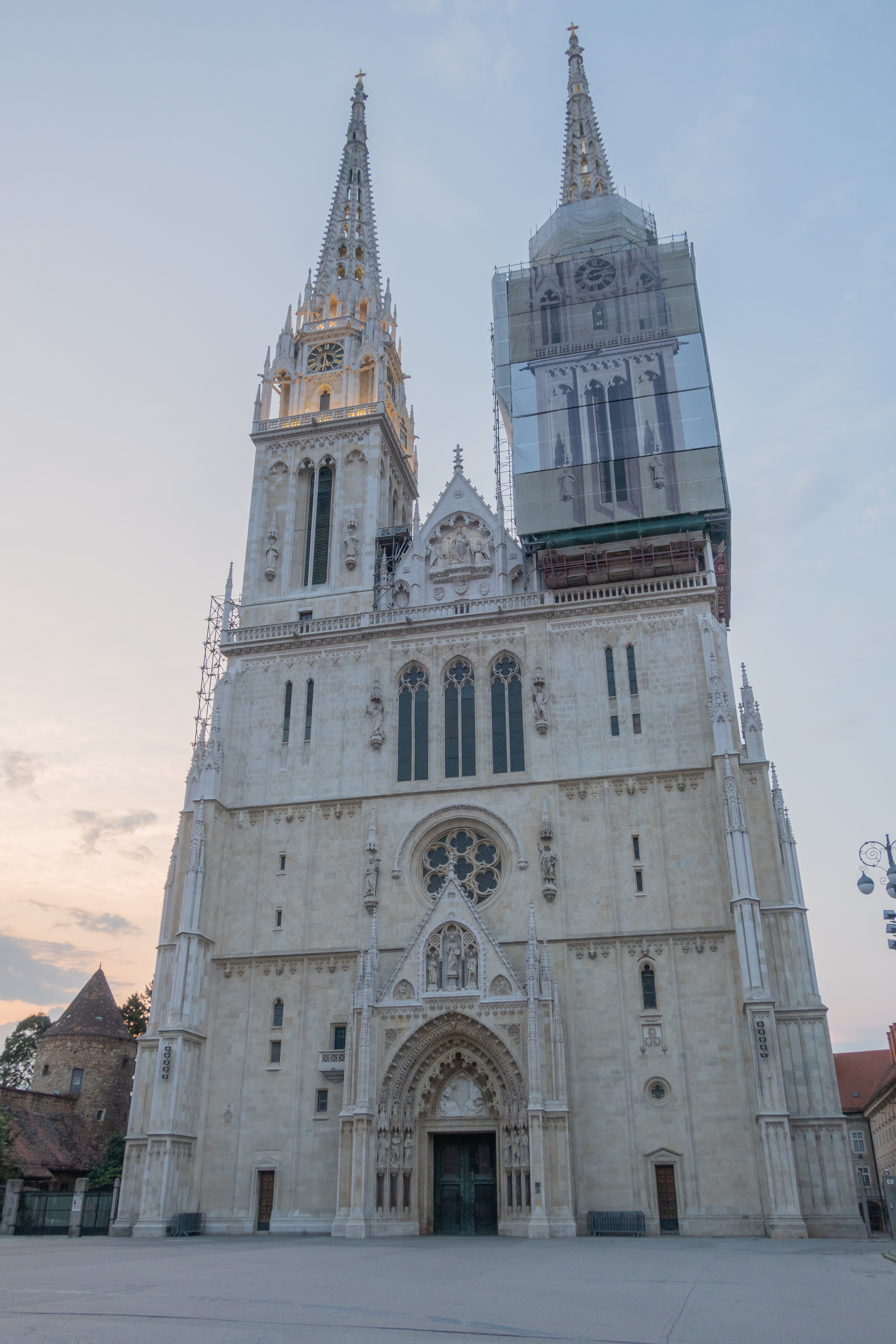
Zagreb Cathedral

Croats are predominantly practicing Catholics of the Latin Church. Before their Christianization, they practiced Slavic paganism. The earliest record of contact between the Pope of Rome and the Croats dates from a mid-7th century entry in the Liber Pontificalis. Pope John IV (John the Dalmatian, 640–642) sent an abbot named Martin to Dalmatia and Istria to pay ransom for some prisoners and the relics of old Christian martyrs. This abbot is recorded as having travelled through Dalmatia with the help of the Croatian leaders, and he established the foundation for future relations between the Pope and the Croats.

The beginnings of the Christianization are also disputed in the historical texts: the Byzantine texts talk of Duke Porin who started this at the incentive of Emperor Heraclius (610–641), then of Duke Porga who mainly Christianized his people after the influence of missionaries from Rome. However, it can be reliably said that the Christianization of Croats began in the 7th century, initially probably encompassing only the elite and related people, but completed mainly by the 9th century. The earliest known Croatian autographs from the 8th century are found in the Latin Gospel of Cividale.

Croats were never obliged to use Latin—rather, they held masses in their own language and used the Glagolitic alphabet. In 1886 it arrived to the Principality of Montenegro, followed by the Kingdom of Serbia in 1914, and the Republic of Czechoslovakia in 1920, but only for feast days of the main patron saints. The 1935 concordat with the Kingdom of Yugoslavia anticipated the introduction of the Church Slavonic for all Croatian regions and throughout the entire state.

Smaller groups of Croats adhere to other religions, like Eastern Orthodoxy (especially in Žumberak), Protestantism, and Islam. According to an official population census of Croatia by ethnicity and religion, roughly 16,600 ethnic Croats adhered to Orthodoxy, roughly 8,000 were Protestants, roughly 10,500 described themselves as "other" Christians, and roughly 9,600 were followers of Islam.

== Culture ==
=== Tradition ===
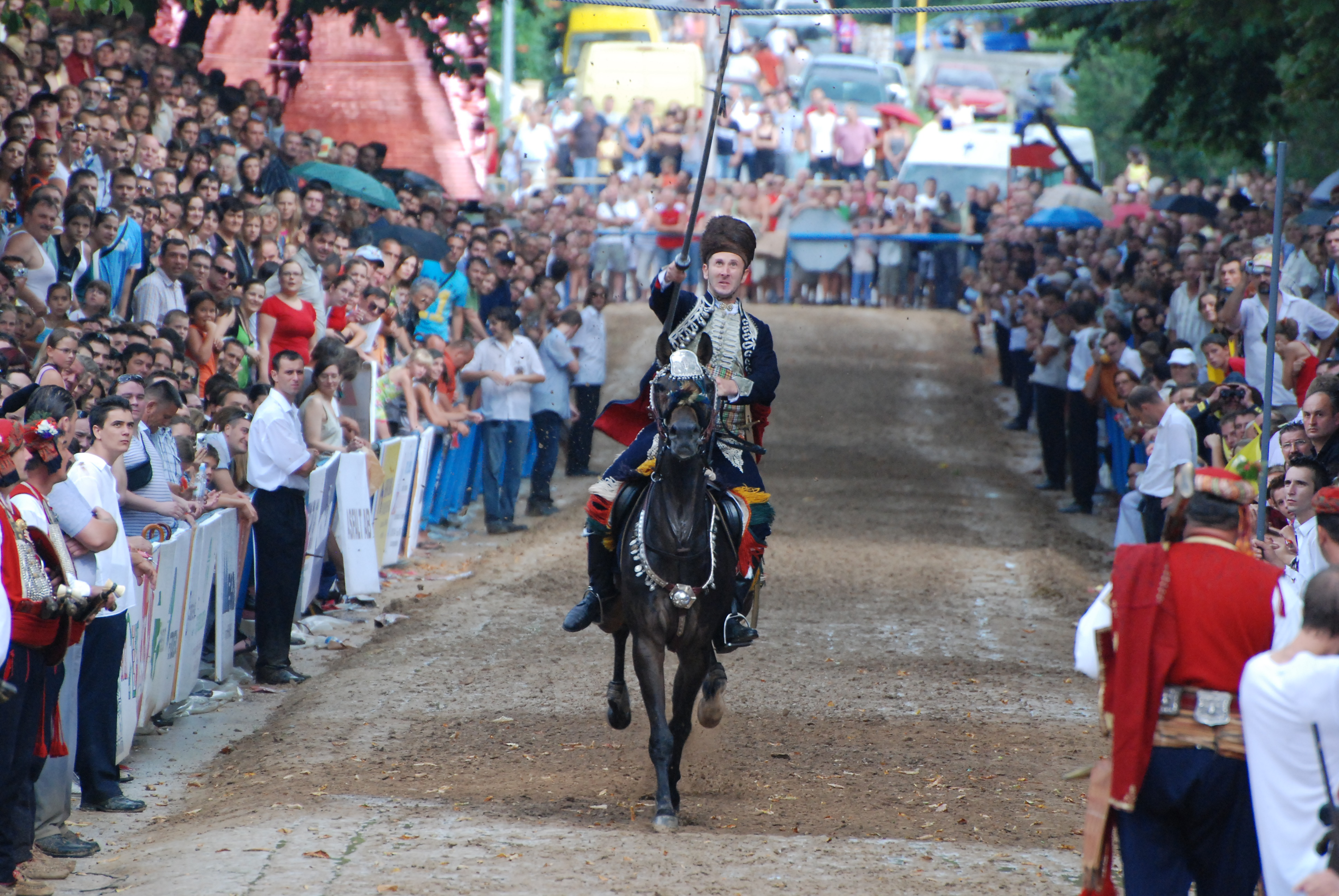
Alka is a traditional knights' competition.

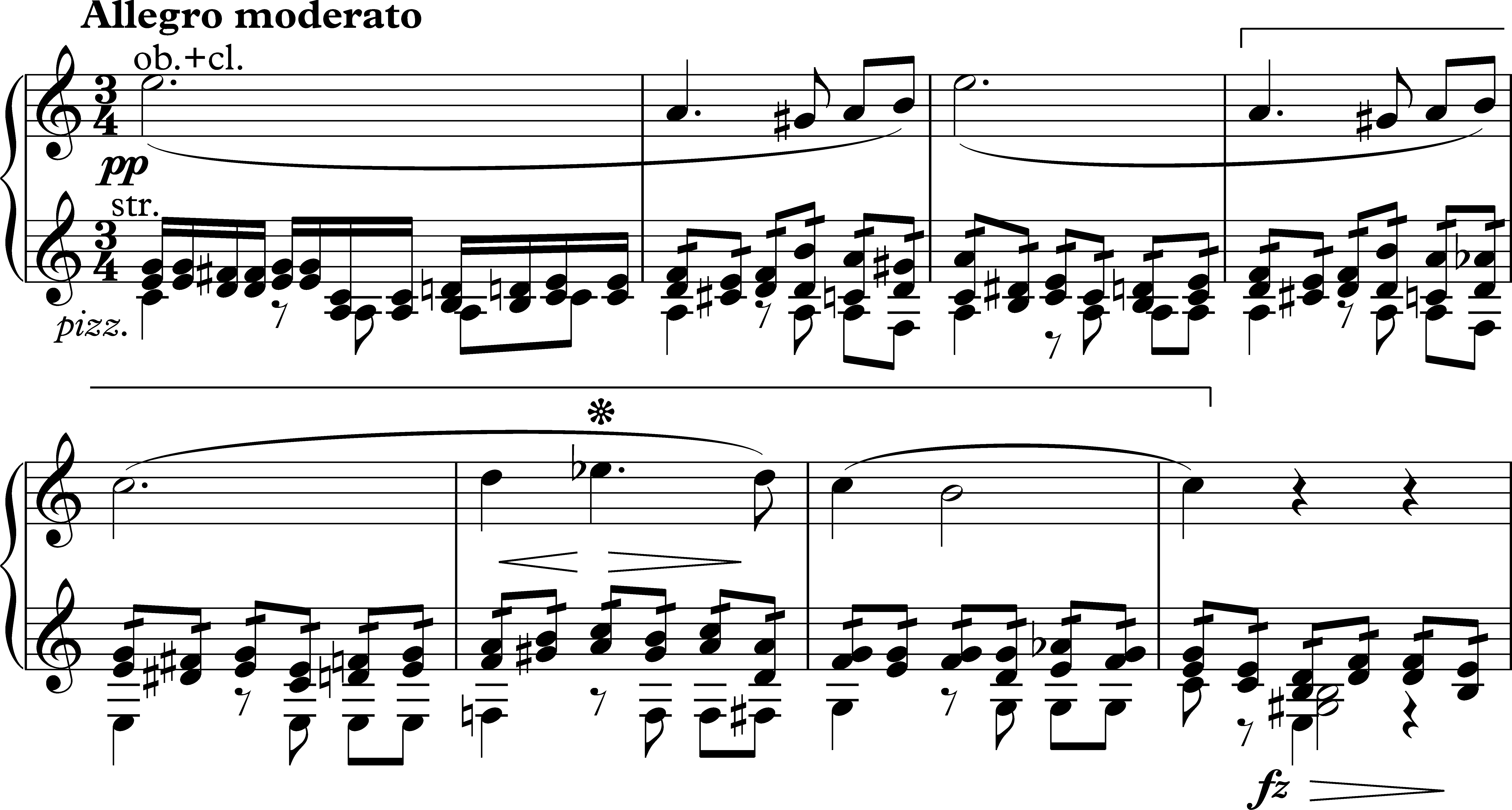
Istrian scale in Schubert's Symphony No. 8 in B minor (1922), 1st mvt., bars 13–20; flat fifth marked with asterisk.

The area settled by Croats has a large diversity of historical and cultural influences, as well as the diversity of terrain and geography. The coastland areas of Dalmatia and Istria were subject to Roman Empire, Venetian, and Italian rule; central regions like Lika and western Herzegovina were a scene of battlefield against the Ottoman Empire, and have strong epic traditions. In the northern plains, Austro-Hungarian rule has left its marks. The most distinctive features of Croatian folklore include klapa ensembles of Dalmatia, tamburitza orchestras of Slavonia. Folk arts are performed at special events and festivals, perhaps the most distinctive being Alka of Sinj, a traditional knights' competition celebrating the victory against Ottoman Turks. The epic tradition is also preserved in epic songs sung with gusle. Various types of kolo circular dance are also encountered throughout Croatia.

=== UNESCO | Intangible Cultural Heritage of Humanity in Croatia ===
List of Cultural Intangible Heritage e.g.:

- "Bećarac singing and playing from Eastern Croatia";
- "Festivity of Saint Blaise, the patron of Dubrovnik";
- "Gingerbread craft from Northern Croatia";
- "Klapa multipart singing of Dalmatia, southern Croatia";
- "Lacemaking in Croatia";
- "Međimurska popevka, a folksong from Međimurje";
- "Nijemo Kolo, silent circle dance of the Dalmatian hinterland";
- "Procession Za Križen ('following the cross')";
- "Spring procession of Ljelje/Kraljice (queens) from Gorjani";
- "Traditional manufacturing of children's wooden toys of Hrvatsko Zagorje";
- "Two-part singing and playing in the Istrian scale";
- "Zvončari, annual carnival bell ringers' pageant from the Kastav area."

=== Arts ===
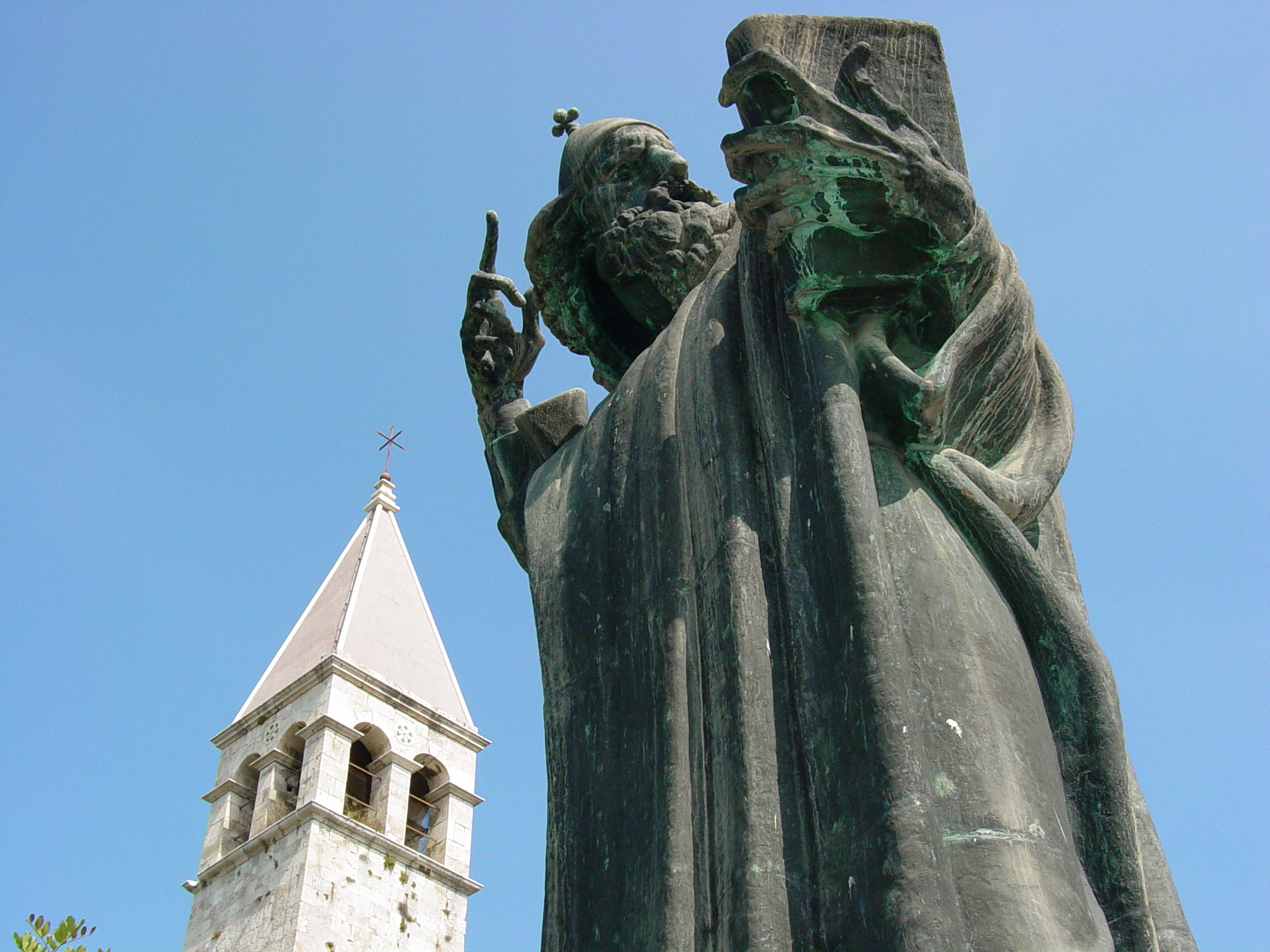
Grgur Ninski statue by Ivan Meštrović, with the bell tower of St. Arnir in the background.

Architecture in Croatia reflects the influences of bordering nations. Austrian and Hungarian influence is visible in public spaces and buildings in the north and in the central regions, architecture found along the coasts of Dalmatia and Istria exhibits Venetian influence. Large squares named after culture heroes, well-groomed parks, and pedestrian-only zones, are features of these orderly towns and cities, especially where large scale Baroque urban planning took place, for instance in Varaždin and Karlovac. Subsequent influence of the Art Nouveau was reflected in contemporary architecture. Along the coast, the architecture is Mediterranean with a strong Venetian and Renaissance influence in major urban areas exemplified in works of Giorgio da Sebenico and Niccolò Fiorentino such as the Cathedral of St. James in Šibenik. The oldest preserved examples of Croatian architecture are the 9th-century churches, with the largest and the most representative among them being the Church of St. Donatus.

Besides the architecture encompassing the oldest artworks in Croatia, there is a long history of artists in Croatia reaching to the Middle Ages. In that period the stone portal of the Trogir Cathedral was made by Radovan, representing the most important monument of Romanesque sculpture in Croatia. The Renaissance had the greatest impact on the Adriatic Sea coast since the remainder of Croatia was embroiled in the Hundred Years' Croatian–Ottoman War. With the waning of the Ottoman Empire, art flourished during the Baroque and Rococo. The 19th and the 20th centuries brought about the affirmation of numerous Croatian artisans, helped by several patrons of the arts such as bishop Josip Juraj Strossmayer. Croatian artists of the period achieving worldwide renown were Vlaho Bukovac and Ivan Meštrović.

The Baška tablet, a stone inscribed with the Glagolitic alphabet found on the Krk island which is dated to 1100, is considered to be the oldest surviving prose in Croatian. The beginning of more vigorous development of Croatian literature is marked by the Renaissance and Marko Marulić. Besides Marulić, Renaissance playwright Marin Držić, Baroque poet Ivan Gundulić, Croatian national revival poet Ivan Mažuranić, novelist, playwright, and poet August Šenoa, poet and writer Antun Gustav Matoš, poet Antun Branko Šimić, expressionist and realist writer Miroslav Krleža, poet Tin Ujević, and novelist and short story writer Ivo Andrić are often cited as the greatest figures in Croatian literature.

== Symbols ==
The current flag of Croatia, including the current coat of arms of Croatia (with five crowning shields representing the "oldest known Croatian coat of arms" (erroneous), Dubrovnik, Dalmatia, Istria, and Slavonia).

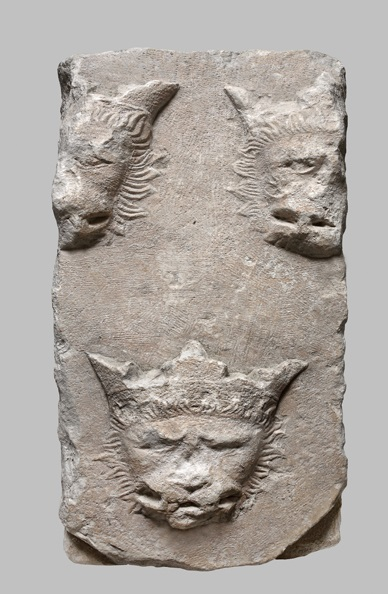
14th century coat of arms of the Kingdom of Croatia and Dalmatia from Bribir, then seat of the Šubić family.

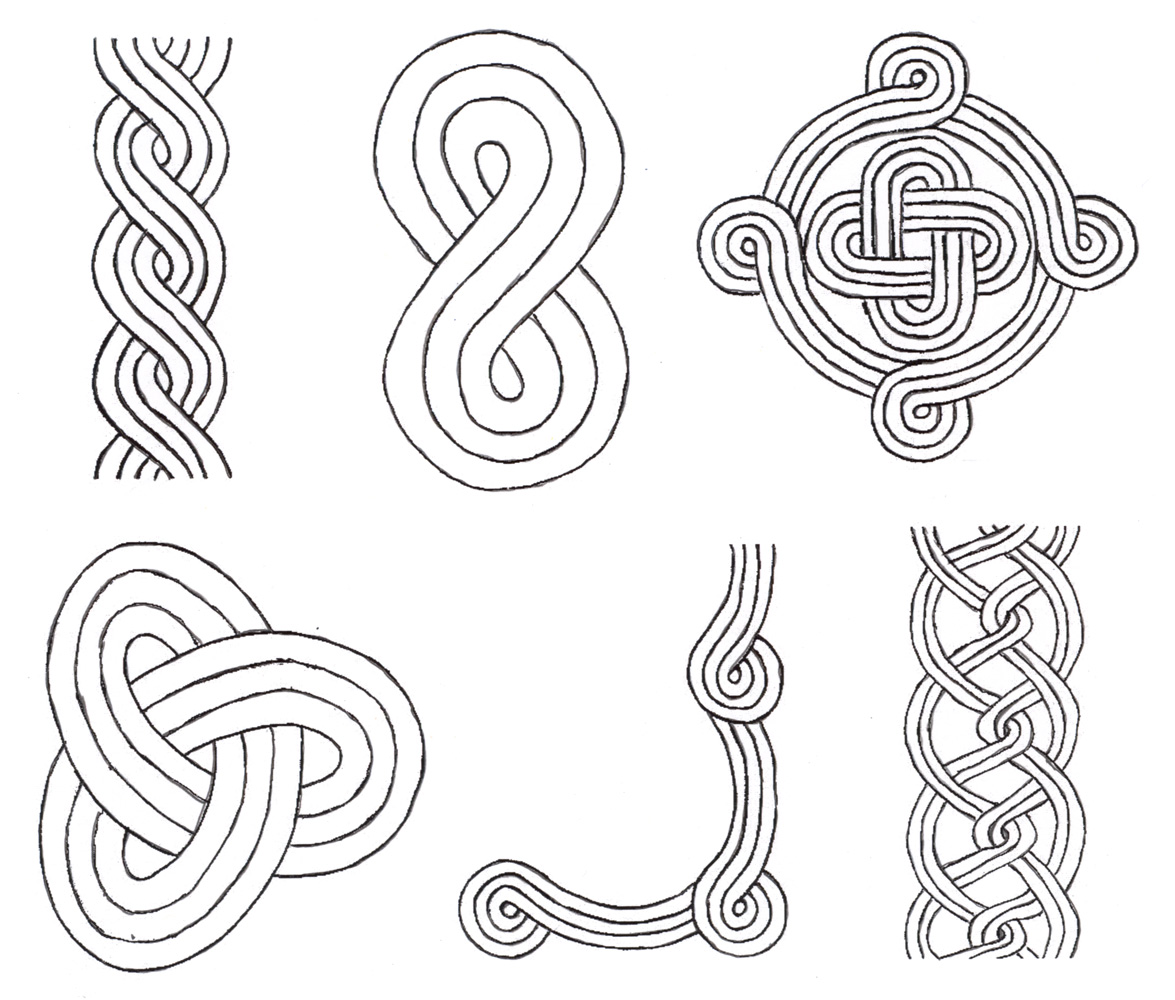
Croatian interlace.

The flag of Croatia consists of a red-white-blue tricolour with the Coat of Arms of Croatia in the middle. The red-white-blue tricolor flag was chosen as those were the colours of Pan-Slavism, popular in the 19th century.

The Coat of arms of Croatia consists of the traditional red and white squares representing Croatian checkerboard on a coat-of-arms. It has been used to symbolise Croatia for centuries, with the earliest confirmed and dated to 1495 in Innsbruck, Austria during the time of Maximilian I, Holy Roman Emperor, and Chiesa dei Domenicani in Bolzano, Italy also from the late 15th century. The first and only time was officially used in the Kingdom of Croatia in the 16th century was during 1527 election in Cetin when Croatian noblemen elected Ferdinand I, Holy Roman Emperor as the new King of Croatia. Before that, another CoA was official coat of arms of Croatia, dated at earliest since 1347 with three leopard or lion heads (later associated only with Dalmatia), while another with silver crescent moon and six pointed star (so-called Leliwa) is common misconception to be oldest CoA of Croatia. Region of Slavonia has oldest confirmed CoA, showcasing a marten between rivers Sava and Drava above which is six pointed star and officially granted in 1496 by Vladislaus II of Hungary. It was used as an official seal by the Slavonian Sabor since 1497, and since 1558 until the early 19th century by the united Croatian and Slavonian Sabor. The first coat of arms uniting all three CoA of the Kingdoms of Dalmatia, Croatia, and Slavonia dates to 1610.

The current design added the five crowning shields, which represent the historical regions from which Croatia originated. Unlike in many countries, Croatian design more commonly uses symbolism from the coat of arms, rather than from the Croatian flag. This is partly due to the geometric design of the shield which makes it appropriate for use in many graphic contexts (e.g. the insignia of Croatia Airlines or the design of the shirt for the Croatia national football team), and partly because neighbouring countries like Slovenia and Serbia use the same Pan-Slavic colours on their flags as Croatia. The Croatian interlace (pleter or troplet) is also a commonly used symbol which originally comes from monasteries built between the 9th and 12th centuries. The interlace can be seen in various emblems and is also featured in modern Croatian military ranks and Croatian police ranks insignia.

== Communities ==
In Croatia (the nation state), 3.9 million people identify themselves as Croats and constitute about 90.4% of the population. Another 553,000 live in Bosnia and Herzegovina, where they are one of the three constituent ethnic groups, predominantly living in Western Herzegovina, Central Bosnia, and Bosnian Posavina. The minority in Serbia number about 70,000, mostly in Vojvodina, where also vast majority of the Šokci consider themselves Croats, as well as many Bunjevci (the latter, as well as other nationalities, settled the vast, abandoned area after the Ottoman retreat; this Croat subgroup originates from the south, mostly from the region of Bačka). Smaller Croat autochthonous minorities exist in Slovenia (mainly in Slovene Littoral, Prekmurje, and in the Metlika area in Lower Carniola regions – 35,000 Croats), Montenegro (mostly in the Bay of Kotor – 6,800 Croats), and a regional community in Kosovo called Janjevci who nationally identify as Croats. In the 1991 census, Croats comprised 19.8% of the overall population of Yugoslavia; there were around 4.6 million Croats in the entire country.

The subgroups of Croats are commonly based on regional affiliation, like Dalmatians, Slavonians, Zagorci, Istrians etc., while inside and outside Croatia there exist several Croatian sub-ethnic groups: Šokci (Croatia, Serbia, Hungary), Bunjevci (Croatia, Serbia, Hungary), Burgenland Croats (Austria), Molise Croats (Italy), Bokelji (Montenegro), Raci (Hungary), Krashovani (Romania), and Janjevci (Kosovo).

=== Autochthonous communities ===
- Croatia is the nation-state of Croats.
- In Bosnia and Herzegovina, Croats are one of three constitute ethnic groups, numbering around 544,780 people or 15.43% of the population. The entity of Federation of Bosnia and Herzegovina is home to the majority (495,000 or about little under 90%) of Bosnian and Herzegovinian Croats.
- In Montenegro, the Bay of Kotor, Croats are a national minority, numbering 6,021 people or 0.97% of the population.
- In Serbia, Croats are a national minority, numbering 57,900 people or 0.80% of the population. They mostly live in the region of Vojvodina, where Croatian is official (along with five other languages), and the national capital city of Belgrade.
- In Slovenia, Croats are not recognized as a minority, numbering 35,642 people or 1.81% of the population. They mostly live in Slovene Littoral, Prekmurje, and in the Metlika area in Lower Carniola regions.

=== Croatian communities with minority status ===
- In Austria, Croats are an ethnic minority, numbering around 30,000 people in Burgenland (Burgenland Croats), the eastern part of Austria, and around 15,000 people in the capital city of Vienna.
- In the Czech Republic, Croats are a national minority, numbering 850–2,000 people, forming a portion of the 29% minority (as "Others"). They mostly live in the region of Moravia, in the villages of Jevišovka, Dobré Pole, and Nový Přerov.
- In Hungary, Croats are an ethnic minority, numbering 25,730 people or 0.26% of the population.
- In Italy, Croats are a linguistic and ethnic minority, numbering 23,880 people, of which 2,801 people belong to the ethnic minority of Molise Croats from the region of Molise.
- In Romania, Croats are a national minority, numbering 6,786 people. They mostly live in the Caraș-Severin County, in communes of Lupac (90.7%) and Carașova (78.28%).
- In Serbia, Croats (including Bunjevci and Šokci) are a national minority. They mostly live in the multiethnic autonomous province of Vojvodina.
- In Slovakia, Croats are an ethnic and national minority, numbering around 850 people. They mostly live in the area around Bratislava, in the villages of Chorvátsky Grob, Čunovo, Devínska Nová Ves, Rusovce, and Jarovce.

=== Other regions with Croat minorities ===
- In Bulgaria, there exists a small Croatian community, a branch of Janjevci, Croats from Kosovo.
- In New Zealand, the mixed Croatian and Māori Tarara people have their own culture, traditions, and customs, and live in Te Tai Tokerau, New Zealand's northernmost region. 15 March is Tarara Day to celebrate their heritage.
- In Kosovo, Croats or Janjevci (Letničani), as they inhabited mostly the town of Janjevo, before 1991 numbered 8,062 people, but after the war many fled, and as of 2011 number only 270 people.
- In North Macedonia, Croats number 2,686 people or 0.1% of the population, mostly living in the capital city of Skopje, the city of Bitola, and around the Lake Ohrid.

=== Diaspora ===
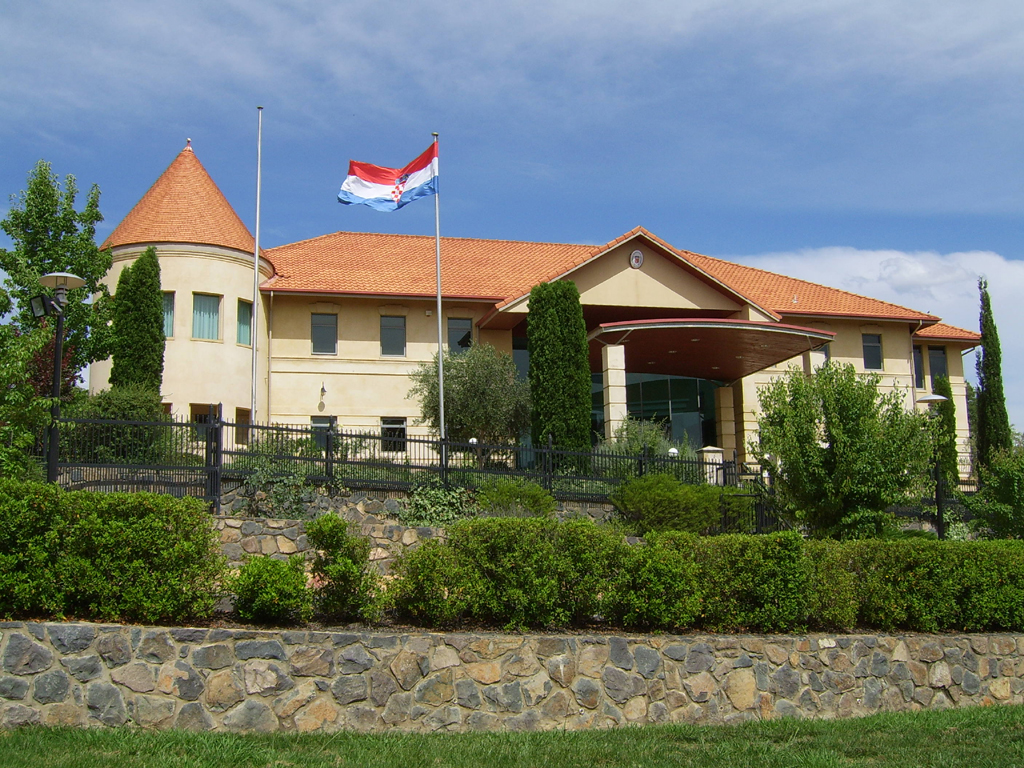
Croatian Embassy in Canberra, Australia.

There are currently 4–4.5 million Croats in diaspora worldwide. The Croat diaspora was the consequence of either mostly economic or political (coercion or expulsions) reasons:

- To other European countries (Slovenia, Italy, Austria, Slovakia, Germany, Hungary), caused by the conquering of Ottoman Turks, when Croats as Catholics were oppressed.
- To the Americas (largely to Canada, the United States of America with significant Croatian communities in Metro Cleveland, Metro Dayton, Greater Pittsburgh, and smaller communities across Ohio and Western Pennsylvania, Chile, and Argentina, with smaller communities in Uruguay, Brazil, Peru, Colombia, and Ecuador) in the end of 19th and early 20th century, large numbers of Croats emigrated particularly for economic reasons.
- To New Zealand, predominately the Northland Region, to work on Kauri gum plantations.
- A further, larger wave of emigration, this time for political reasons, took place after the end of the World War II in Yugoslavia. At this time, both collaborators of the Ustasha regime and those who did not want to live under a communist regime fled the country, to the Americas and Oceania once more.
- As immigrant workers, particularly to Germany, Austria, and Switzerland in the 1960s and 1970s. In addition, some emigrants left for political reasons. This migration made it possible for communist Yugoslavia to achieve lower unemployment and at the same time the money sent home by emigrants to their families provided an enormous source of foreign exchange income.
- The last large wave of Croat emigration occurred during and after the Yugoslav Wars (1991–1995). Migrant communities already established in the Americas, Oceania, and across Europe grew as a result.

The count for diaspora is approximate because of incomplete statistical records and naturalization. Overseas, the United States contains the largest Croatian emigrant group (414,714 according to the 2010 census), mostly in Ohio, Pennsylvania, Illinois, and California, with a sizable community in Alaska, followed by Australia (133,268 according to the 2016 census, with concentrations in Sydney, Melbourne, and Perth) and Canada (133,965 according to the 2016 census, mainly in Southern Ontario, British Columbia, and Alberta).

Various estimations put the total number of Americans and Canadians with at least some Croatian ancestry at 2 million, many of whom do not identify as such in the countries' censuses.

Croats have also emigrated in several waves to South America: chiefly Chile, Argentina, and Brazil; estimates of their number vary wildly, from 150,000 up to 500,000. Both the presidents of Chile (Gabriel Boric) and Argentina (Javier Milei) are of Croatian descent.

There are also smaller groups of Croatian descendants in Brazil, Ecuador, Peru, South Africa, Mexico, and South Korea. The most important organizations of the Croatian diaspora are the Croatian Fraternal Union, Croatian Heritage Foundation, and the Croatian World Congress.

== Maps ==
Ethnicities by municipality in Croatia in 2021

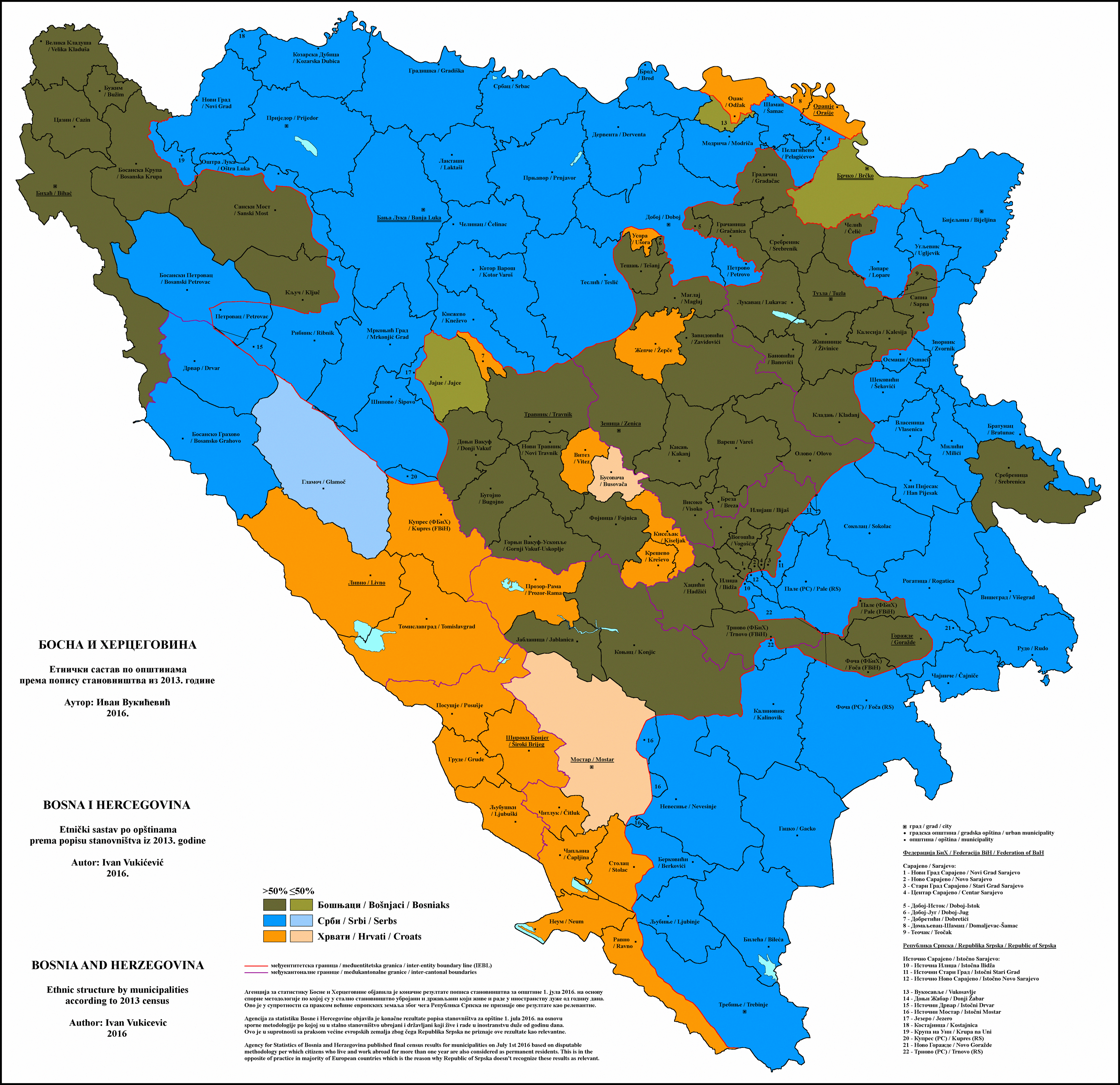
Croats in Bosnia and Herzegovina in 2013

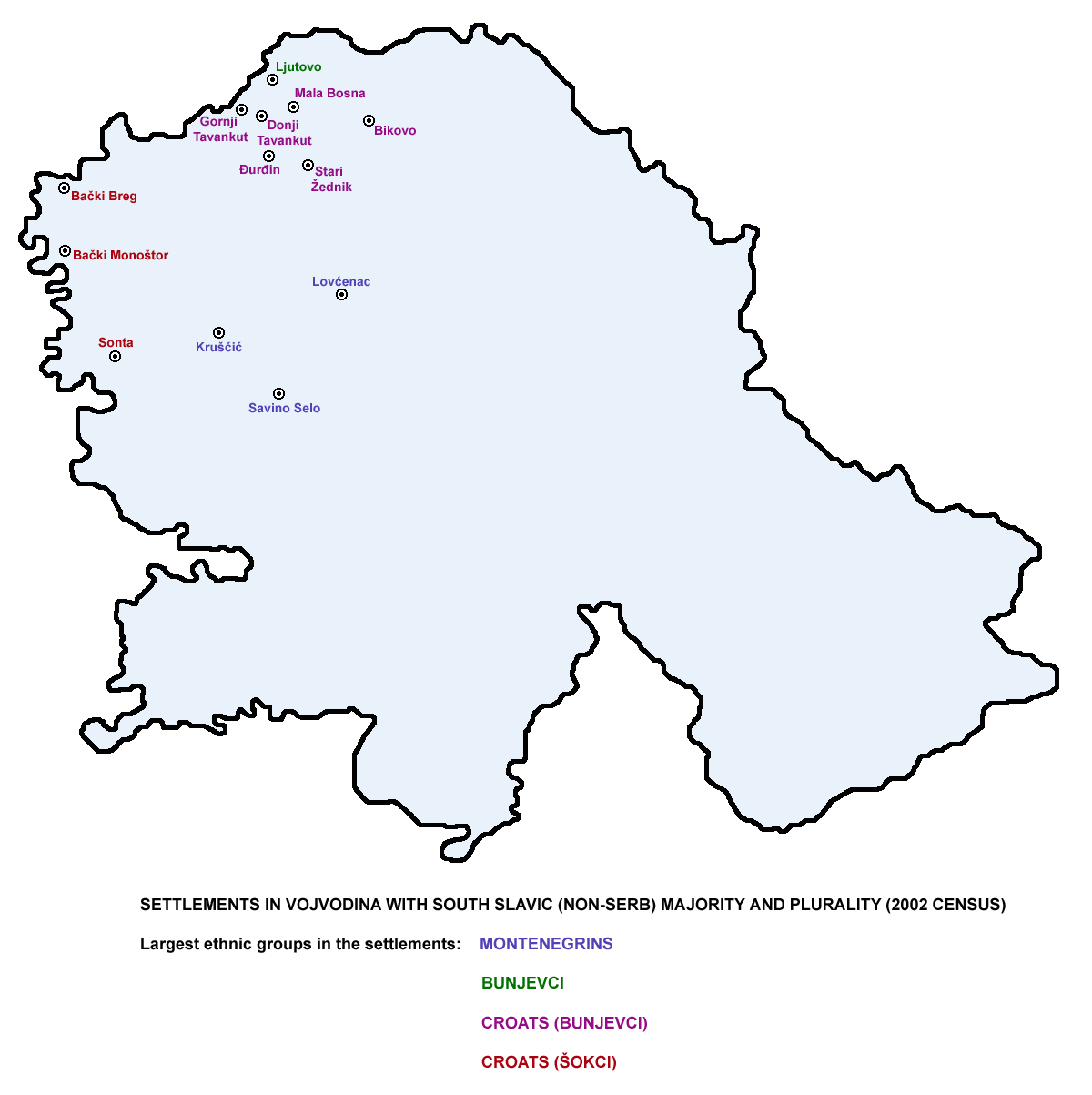
Croats in Vojvodina, Serbia

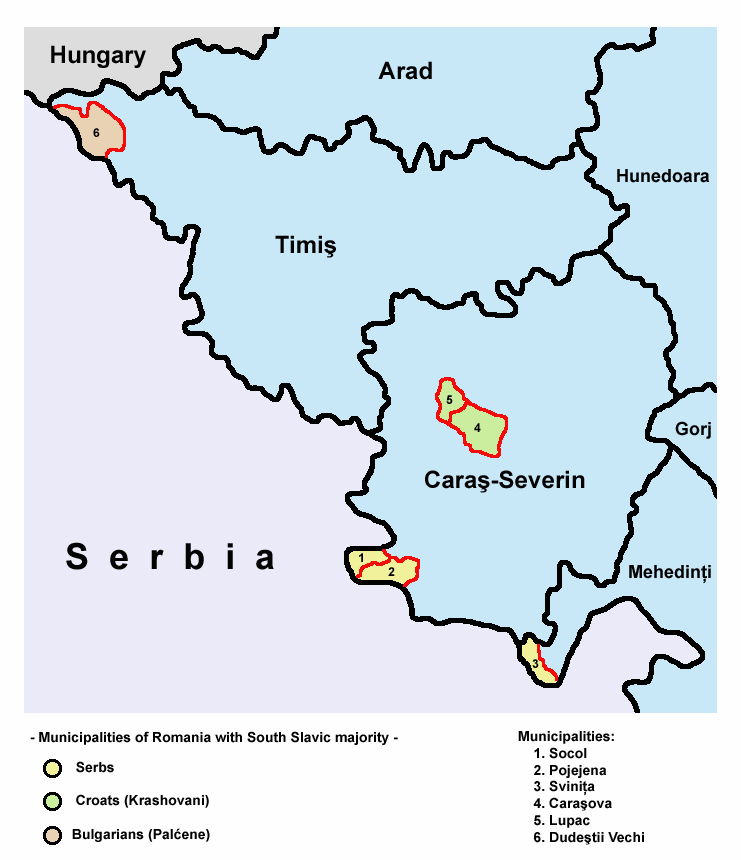
Croats in Romania

== See also ==
- Croatia, nation-state of Croats
- Demographics of Croatia
- Timeline of Croatian history
- List of Croats
- List of rulers of Croatia
- Genetic studies on Croats
- Origin hypotheses of the Croats
- Slavs; Medieval Slav tribes; South Slavs

== Sources ==
- Budak, Neven (2018). Hrvatska povijest od 550. do 1100 [Croatian history from 550 until 1100]. Leykam international. ISBN 978-953-340-061-7. Archived from the original on 3 October 2022.
- Dzino, Danijel (2010), Becoming Slav, Becoming Croat. Identity transformations in post-Roman and Early Medieval Dalmatia, Brill
- Curta, Florin (2001). The Making of the Slavs: History and Archaeology of the Lower Danube Region, c. 500–700. Cambridge: Cambridge University Press. ISBN 978-1-139-42888-0. Archived from the original on 27 September 2023.
- Curta, Florin (2006). Southeastern Europe in the Middle Ages, 500–1250. Cambridge: Cambridge University Press. ISBN 978-0-521-81539-0.
- Fine, John Van Antwerp (1991). The early medieval Balkans: a critical survey from the sixth to the late twelfth century. University of Michigan Press. ISBN 978-0-472-08149-3. Archived from the original on 27 September 2023.
- Fine, John Van Antwerp Jr. (2005). When Ethnicity Did Not Matter in the Balkans: A Study of Identity in Pre-Nationalist Croatia, Dalmatia, and Slavonia in the Medieval and Early-Modern Periods. Ann Arbor, Michigan: University of Michigan Press. ISBN 0-472-02560-0. Archived from the original on 27 September 2023.
- Wolfram, Herwig (2002), "Slavic Princes in the Carolingian Marches of Bavaria", Hortus Artium Medievalium, 8: 205–208, doi:10.1484/J.HAM.2.305235
- I. H. Garipzanov; P. Geary; P. Urbanczyk, eds. (2008), "Identities in Early Medieval Dalmatia (Seventh–Eleventh Centuries)", Franks, Northmen, and Slavs Identities and State Formation in Early Medieval Europe, Brepols
- L. Barać; et al. (2003). "Y chromosomal heritage of Croatian population and its island isolates" (PDF). European Journal of Human Genetics. 11 (7): 535–542. doi:10.1038/sj.ejhg.5200992. PMID 12825075. S2CID 15822710. Archived (PDF) from the original on 17 December 2012.
- S. Rootsi; et al. (2004). "Phylogeography of Y-Chromosome Haplogroup I Reveals Distinct Domains of Prehistoric Gene Flow in Europe" (PDF). American Journal of Human Genetics. 75 (1): 128–137. Bibcode:2004AmJHG..75..128R. doi:10.1086/422196. PMC 1181996. PMID 15162323. Archived (PDF) from the original on 5 September 2020.
- M. Peričić; et al. (2005). "High-resolution phylogenetic analysis of southeastern Europe traces major episodes of paternal gene flow among Slavic populations". Molecular Biology and Evolution. 22 (10): 1964–75. doi:10.1093/molbev/msi185. PMID 15944443.
- V. Battaglia; et al. (2008). "Y-chromosomal evidence of the cultural diffusion of agriculture in southeast Europe". European Journal of Human Genetics. 17 (6): 820–830. doi:10.1038/ejhg.2008.249. PMC 2947100. PMID 19107149.
- S. Cvjetan; et al. (2004). "Frequencies of mtDNA Haplogroups in Southeastern Europe-Croatians, Bosnians and Herzegovinians, Serbians, Macedonians and Macedonian Romani". Collegium Antropologicum. 28 (1): 193–198. PMID 15636075.
- Heršak, Emil; Nikšić, Boris (2007), "Hrvatska etnogeneza: pregled komponentnih etapa i interpretacija (s naglaskom na euroazijske/nomadske sadržaje)" [Croatian Ethnogenesis: A Review of Component Stages and Interpretations (with Emphasis on Eurasian/Nomadic Elements)], Migration and Ethnic Themes (in Croatian), 23 (3), archived from the original on 8 August 2014
