= Tarara (disambiguation) =

Tarará is a gated resort town in Havana, Cuba.

Tarara may refer to:

- Nichifor Tarara (born 1936), Romanian sprint canoer and 1958 Olympic bronze medalist
- Rajeev Tarara (born 1981), Indian politician
- Stefan Tarara, third place violinist in the 2010 Paganini Competition and 2011 Henryk Wieniawski Violin Competition
- Tarara, a character in Utopia, Limited, a Gilbert and Sullivan opera
- Tarara (Māori Croatian ethnic mix), a name given to the members of the Croatian diaspora in New Zealand by Māori
  - Tarara Day
- Tarara, New Zealand, a locality in South Otago
