= Kačić =

Kȁčić (Croatian pronunciation: [kâtʃitɕ]) is a Croatian surname. It is chiefly distributed in the city of Split, and the area of southern and central Dalmatia. Etymologically it derives from the word kača "snake".

It may refer to:

- Kačić noble family, which includes medieval Hungarian branch Kacsics
- Andrija Kačić Miošić (1704–1760), Croatian poet and Franciscan friar
- Hrvoje Kačić (born 1932), former Croatian water polo player, academician and politician
- Miro Kačić (1946–2001), Croatian linguist
- Igor Kačić (1975–1991), youngest victim of the Vukovar massacre
