= Croats in Switzerland =

Ethnic group

The Croats in Switzerland (Croatian: Hrvati u Švicarskoj) number between 31,000 and 44,035. 92% of them follow Christianity, mainly Roman Catholicism (which is followed by 95% of them), and 0.4% of them follow Evangelicalism.

== See also ==
- Croatia–Switzerland relations
- Croats
- List of Croats
- Immigration to Switzerland
- Croats in Austria
- Croats in France
- Croats in Germany
- Croats of Italy
