= Wooden toys of Hrvatsko Zagorje =

Traditional wooden toys made in the region of Hrvatsko Zagorje in Croatia

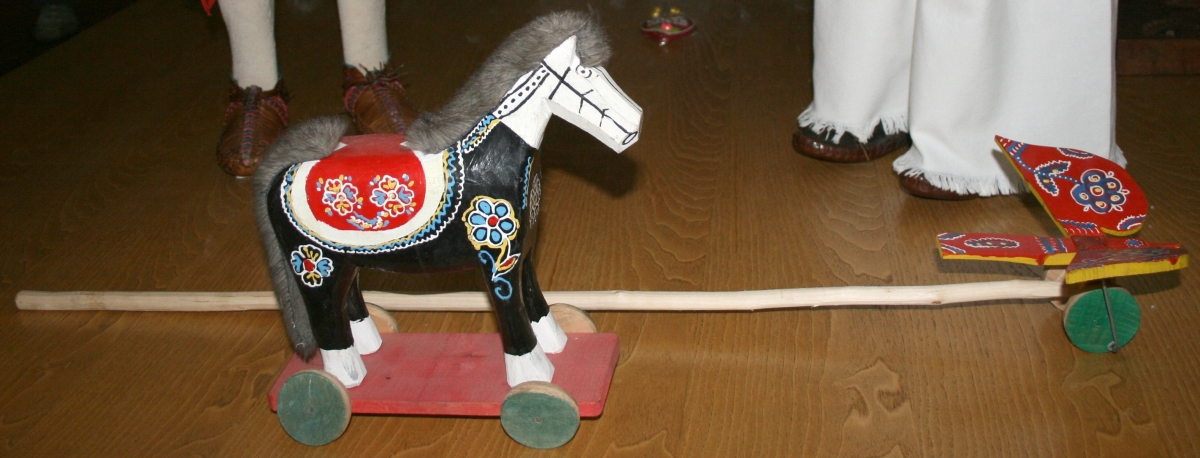
- Traditional toy on display
- Type: Traditional
- Country: Croatia
- Availability: 19th century–present

Traditional manufacturing of children’s wooden toys in Hrvatsko Zagorje
- UNESCO Intangible Cultural Heritage
- Country: Croatia
- Reference: 00233
- Region: Europe and North America

Inscription history
- Inscription: 2009 (4th session)
- List: Representative

Wooden toys of Hrvatsko Zagorje (Croatian: Drvene igračke Hrvatskog zagorja) are traditional wooden toys made in the region of Zagorje in Croatia. The method of production, from starting with raw wood to finishing applications of paint, has been passed down from generation to generation, with families continuing to use traditional techniques even in modern times.

== History ==
The technique for crafting wooden toys dates back to the 19th century, when several villages along the traveling path to the religious pilgrimage site Marija Bistrica began carving wood to make trinkets and toys. Local wood such as maple, willow, beech, and lime were used to carve into various shapes using special tools to achieve precise cuts. After the men created the toys, the women would hand paint unique designs and motifs using bright colors of red, yellow, and blue.

In 2009 the custom was inscribed as part of UNESCO's Representative List of the Intangible Cultural Heritage of Humanity.

== See also ==
- Intangible cultural heritage
