= Tarara Day =

New Zealand national holiday

Tarara Day is held every year on 15 March in New Zealand. It is the day when Tarara—descendants of Croatian men who arrived in the 1890s to dig gum and of Māori women—celebrate their combined heritage.
