= Croatian Ecuadorians =

(Croatia) Croatian Ecuadorians (Ecuador)
Total population
- c. 4,000

Regions with significant populations
- Manta, Bahía de Caráquez, Guayaquil.

Languages
- Spanish, Croatian

Religion
- Roman Catholic

Related ethnic groups
- Croats, Croatian diaspora

Croatian Ecuadorians are Ecuadorians who are descended from migrants from Croatia. There are approximately 4,000 Croats and their descendants living in Ecuador. One can mention two major periods of the immigration of Croats to Ecuador; the first one at the end of the 19th century and the early 20th century and the recent that started in the 1990s. During the first period, Croat immigrants were moistly traders from Dubrovnik, Split and the island of Vis who settled in agricultural parts of Ecuador, especially in the region of Manabí, and in the cities such Bahía de Caráquez, Chone, Manta, Portoviejo and Guayaquil, Cuenca and Quito. The current immigration of Croats began with their arrival in Ecuador and was largely motivated by the interest in the fish industry and the exploration of marine crustaceans. Most of these new immigrants come from the Adriatic coast, especially from Split, and are employed in the tuna and sardines processing industry. Ecuadorian Croats and their descendants have a high cultural and economic status in the society and are quite prominent, particularly in the agricultural and fishing fields, as well as in commerce and industry. Ecuador has a large fleet of ships for banana transportation; also fish and merchant vessels whose crew is also made up of Croats living in Guayaquil. They are, however, not registered as Croatian immigrants. In 2004 an association was established in Ecuador where Croats and their descendants often congregate.

== Notable people ==
- Hugo Savinovich - former WWE Ecuadorian announcer and professional wrestler.
- Radmila Pandžić - ex-Miss Ecuador 1995.
- Tomislav Topić - Ecuadorian businessman.
- Jan Topić - Tomislav Topic's son, businessman and presidential candidate in 2023.
- Mara Topić - Miss Ecuador 2024.
- Édgar Diminich - sailor.

== See also ==
- Croats
- List of people from Croatia
