= Croatian Brazilians =

Croatian Brazilians Croato-brasileiros
- (Brazil) (Croatia)
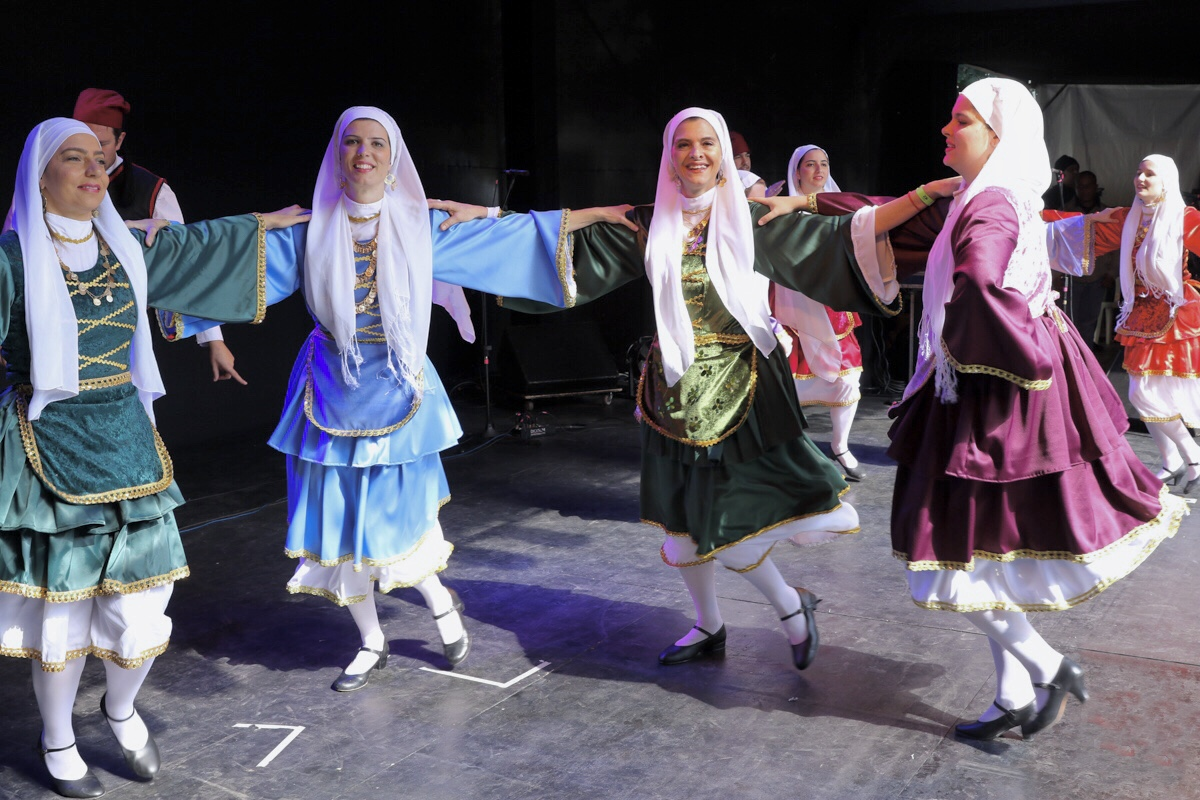
- Croatian descendants in São Paulo.

Total population
- 45,000

Regions with significant populations
- Mainly Southeastern Brazil

Languages
- Portuguese, Croatian

Religion
- Christianity (predominantly Catholic), and others

Related ethnic groups
- Other Brazilians, Croats

Croatian Brazilians (Croato-brasileiro, Croata brasileiro) are Brazilians of full, partial, or predominantly Croat descent, or Croat-born people residing in Brazil.

It is estimated that 45,000 ethnic Croats live in Brazil. The training and work qualifications of Croat emigrants in the inter-war period remained more or less unchanged from what it had been in the earlier period; most emigrants were unskilled farmers and the number of craftsmen who emigrated increased by only a small amount.

However, in the countries of South America which became very important emigration targets in the post-World War I period agricultural workers or other laborers were still in demand, and in those destinations the bulk of emigrants took up employment in agriculture (Argentina and Brazil) or in the mines (Chile and Bolivia).

== History ==
From as far back as the 1830s the first wave of mass emigrations to the countries of the New World occurred, which mainly saw the Croatian population fit into the context of European migration flows of the time. There were many reasons why Croatians emigrated to foreign countries: economic underdevelopment, political reasons, and for reasons of adventure and exploration. But for the majority of people who left their homes at the time the main reason was the economic situation. The most striking example of this was the so-called "Wine Clause," stipulated in an 1891 trade agreement between the Austro-Hungarian Empire and Italy, which was particularly unfavorable to Dalmatian viticulture. The Wine Clause allowed the import of cheap Italian wines under very favorable conditions. The Dalmatian wine industry was heavily affected by this resolution by the Viennese authorities, which reduced its market in Croatia itself. The agreement lasted decades and was not revised for some time.

Political conditions as the main motive of emigration was the result of World War I and became much more significant immediately after World War II and the collapse of the Independent State of Croatia, when hundreds of thousands emigrated for fear of retaliation by the Yugoslav authorities. The emigrants were mostly men from rural areas, young and without professional qualifications. In general, it is safe to say that they performed the hardest and the most dangerous physical labor in the countries they moved to. So-called chain emigration results in compact groups of emigrants, often related by family connections, place of emigration, region, etc. Thus, many emigrants from Dubrovnik have large communities in California, emigrants from the island of Hvar in Argentina, emigrants from Korčula in Brazil, emigrants from the Lika region in the American Midwest, emigrants from Makarska in New Zealand and Dalmatians in Chile and Australia. The most recent research conducted can't conclusively reveal how many Croatians have left their country and how many currently live abroad.

== See also ==
- Brazil–Croatia relations
- Immigration to Brazil
- European immigration to Brazil
- Croats
- List of Croats
