= Međimurska popevka =

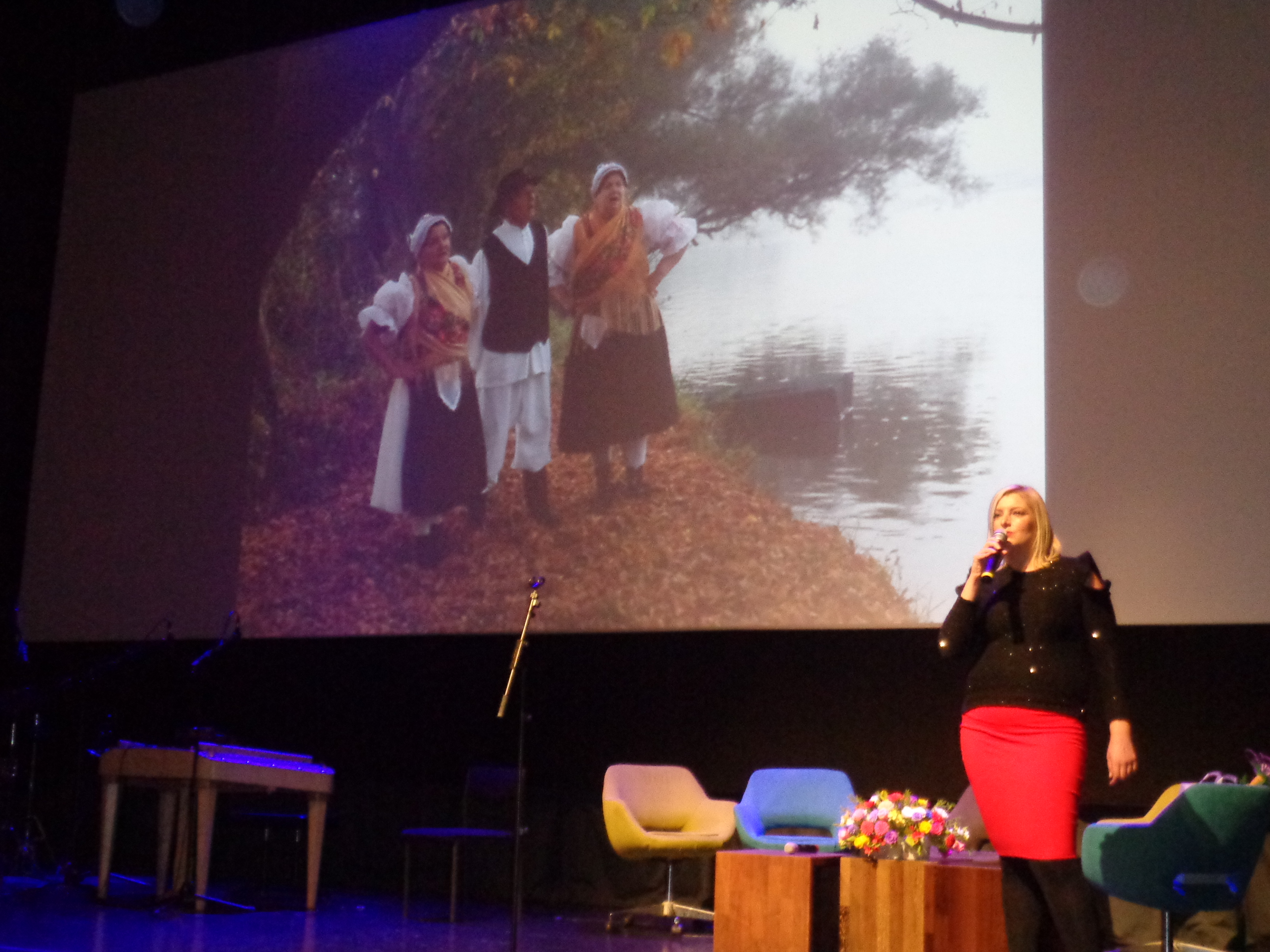
- Međimurska popevka film promotion
- Stylistic origins: Croatian music
- Cultural origins: Međimurje County

Međimurska popevka, a folksong from Međimurje
- UNESCO Intangible Cultural Heritage
- Country: Croatia
- Reference: 01396
- Region: Europe and North America

Inscription history
- Inscription: 2018 (13th session)
- List: Representative

Međimurska popevka is a folk song originating from the Međimurje region of northern Croatia. It was added to UNESCO's Representative List of the Intangible Cultural Heritage of Humanity in 2018.

== Description ==
Međimurska popevka is a form of folksinging widespread throughout the northern part of Croatia bordering Slovenia and Hungary. It has historically been performed by solo female vocalists, although in modern times it is performed both individual and in groups, and both men and women. The songs can be performed in vocal, vocal instrumental, or instrumental as well as monophonic/multipart renditions, as musical genre, or incorporated into dance. Popevka commonly takes place in social and community gatherings, such as weddings, religious gatherings, annual holidays, and in modern times, folk festivals.
