= Croatian Heritage Foundation =

The Croatian Heritage Foundation (Croatian: Hrvatska matica iseljenika) is an organization which works with Croatian emigrants. It helps connect diaspora groups back to the country. The foundation organizes several programs within Croatia and around the world ranging from language to folklore. It publishes its own monthly magazine, Matica, as well as the Croatian Emigrant Almanac (Hrvatski iseljenički zbornik), printed in Croatian, English and Spanish.

A large part of the foundation's work deals with preventing the assimilation of diaspora Croats into other cultures. This is significant because of the relatively large population of Croats living outside of the country. The CHF runs branches in Pula, Rijeka, Zadar, Split, Dubrovnik and Vukovar.

Its current director is Mijo Matić.
