= Karl Käser =

Karl Käser or Kaser may refer to:

- Karl Käser (cyclist)
- Karl Kaser (historian)

== See also ==
- Karl Kaiser, politician from Liechtenstein
