= History of Croatia =

At the height of the Roman Empire, the area of modern Croatia comprised two Roman provinces, Pannonia and Dalmatia. After the collapse of the Western Roman Empire in the 5th century, the area was subjugated by the Ostrogoths for 50 years, before being incorporated into the Byzantine Empire.

Croatia, as a polity, first appeared as a duchy in the 7th century. With the nearby Principality of Lower Pannonia, it was united and elevated into the Kingdom of Croatia which lasted from 925 until 1102. From the 12th century, the Kingdom of Croatia entered a personal union with the Kingdom of Hungary. It remained a distinct state with its ruler (Ban) and Sabor, but it elected royal dynasties from neighboring powers, primarily Hungary, Naples, and the Habsburg monarchy. From the 15th to the 17th centuries was marked by intense struggles between the Ottoman Empire to the south and the Habsburg Empire to the north.

Following the First World War and the dissolution of Austria-Hungary in 1918, Croatian lands were incorporated into the Kingdom of Yugoslavia. Germany invaded Yugoslavia in 1941, operating the puppet state Independent State of Croatia alongside Italy until 1943. The Socialist Republic of Croatia was formed as a constituent republic of Socialist Yugoslavia until Croatia proclaimed independence in 1991. As a modern country, Croatia joined the military alliance NATO in 2009, later ascending into the European Union in 2013.

== Prehistoric period ==
The area known today as Croatia was inhabited by hominids throughout the prehistoric period. Fossils of Neanderthals dating to the middle Palaeolithic period have been unearthed in northern Croatia, with the most famous and best-presented site in Krapina. Remnants of several Neolithic and Chalcolithic cultures have been found throughout the country. Most of the sites are in the northern Croatian river valleys, and the most significant cultures whose presence was discovered include the Starčevo, Vučedol and Baden cultures. The Iron Age left traces of the early Illyrian Hallstatt culture and the Celtic La Tène culture.

=== Protohistoric period ===
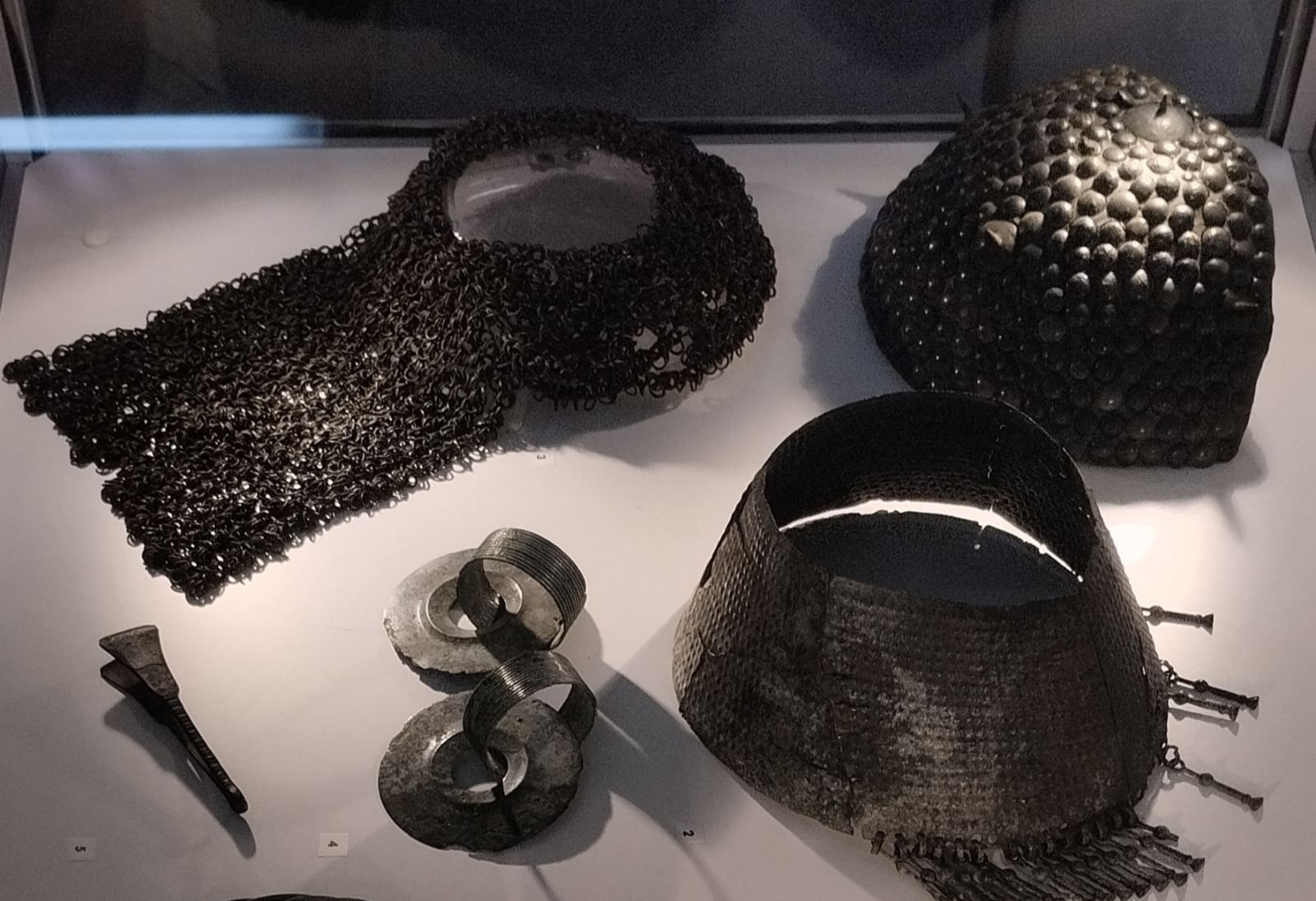
Iapodian headwear and other material culture from Gacka valley, Croatia.

Greek author Hecataeus of Miletus mentions that around 500 BC, the Eastern Adriatic region was inhabited by local tribes such as Histrians, Liburnians, and Illyrians. Greek colonization saw settlers establish communities on of Issa (Vis), Korkyra Melain (Korčula) and Pharos (Starigrad on Hvar) islands as well as trading outposts of Tragurion (Trogir) and Epetion (Stobreč). Somewhere in 3rd century by, Greek colony of Issa formed an alliance with then emerging Roman Republic. As Isseian maritime trade became affected by Illyrian pirating activities, they asked for Roman intervention against the Illyrian kingdom, leading to the First Illyrian War in 229. BC and beginning of Roman expansion on the Eastern Adriatic.

== Roman expansion ==
Before the Roman expansion, the eastern Adriatic coast formed the northern part of the Illyrian kingdom from the 4th century BC to the Illyrian Wars in the 220s BC. In 168 BC, the Roman Republic established a protectorate south of the Neretva river. The area north of the Neretva was slowly incorporated into Roman possession until the province of Illyricum was formally established c. 32–27 BC.

These lands then became part of the Roman province of Illyricum. Between 6 and 9 AD, tribes including the Dalmatae, who gave name to these lands, rose up against the Romans in the Great Illyrian revolt, but the uprising was crushed, and in 10 AD Illyricum was split into two provinces—Pannonia and Dalmatia. The province of Dalmatia spread inland to cover all of the Dinaric Alps and most of the eastern Adriatic coast. Dalmatia was the birthplace of the Roman Emperor Diocletian, who, when he retired as Emperor in 305 AD, built a large palace near Salona, from which the city of Split later developed.

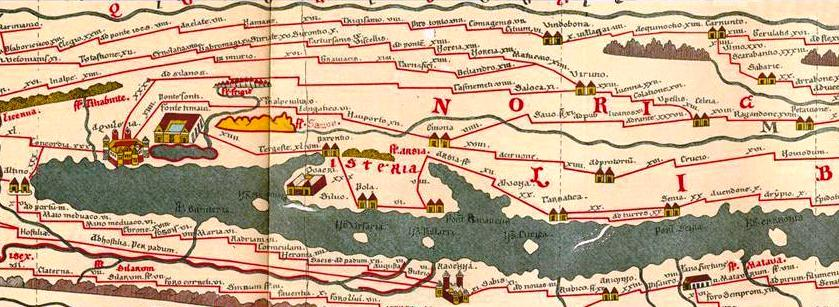
A map of the Istrian peninsula from the Roman map Tabula Peutingeriana, made sometime in the 4th century

Historians such as Theodore Mommsen and Bernard Bavant argue that all of Dalmatia was fully Romanized and Latin-speaking by the 4th century. Others, such as Aleksandar Stipčević, argue that the process of Romanization was selective and involved mostly the urban centers but not the countryside, where previous Illyrian socio-political structures were adapted to Roman administration and political structure only where necessary. Stanko Guldescu has argued that the Vlachs, or Morlachs, were Latin-speaking, pastoral peoples who lived in the Balkan mountains since pre-Roman times. They are mentioned in the oldest Croatian chronicles.

After the Western Roman Empire collapsed in 476, with the beginning of the Migration Period, Julius Nepos briefly ruled his diminished domain from Diocletian's Palace after his 476 flight from Italy. The region was then ruled by the Ostrogoths until 535 when Justinian I added the territory to the Byzantine Empire. Later, the Byzantines formed the Theme of Dalmatia in the same territory.

=== Migration period ===
The Roman period ended with the Avar and White Croat invasions in the 6th and 7th centuries and the destruction of almost all Roman towns. The city of Ragusa was founded by survivors from Epidaurum. According to the work De Administrando Imperio, written by the 10th-century Byzantine Emperor Constantine VII, the Croats arrived in what is today Croatia from southern Poland and Western Ukraine in the early 7th century, and successfully conquered the province of Dalmatia in a war against the Pannonian Avars. However, the claim about the date of arrival is disputed and competing hypotheses date the event between late the 6th-early 7th (mainstream) or the late 8th-early 9th (fringe) centuries. Recent archaeological data established that the migration and settlement of the Slavs/Croats occurred in the late 6th and early 7th centuries.

== Duchy of Croatia (800–925) ==
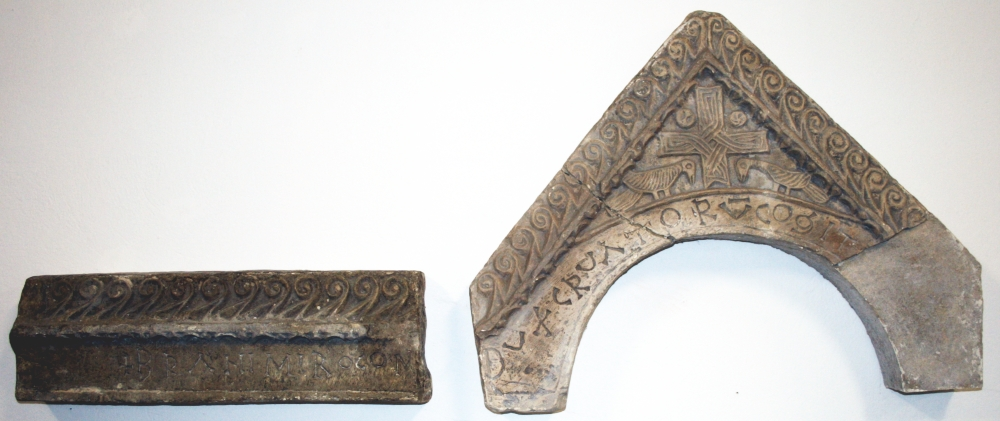
Branimir inscription (879–892), a Latin language reference to Duke Branimir as Dux Cruatorum.

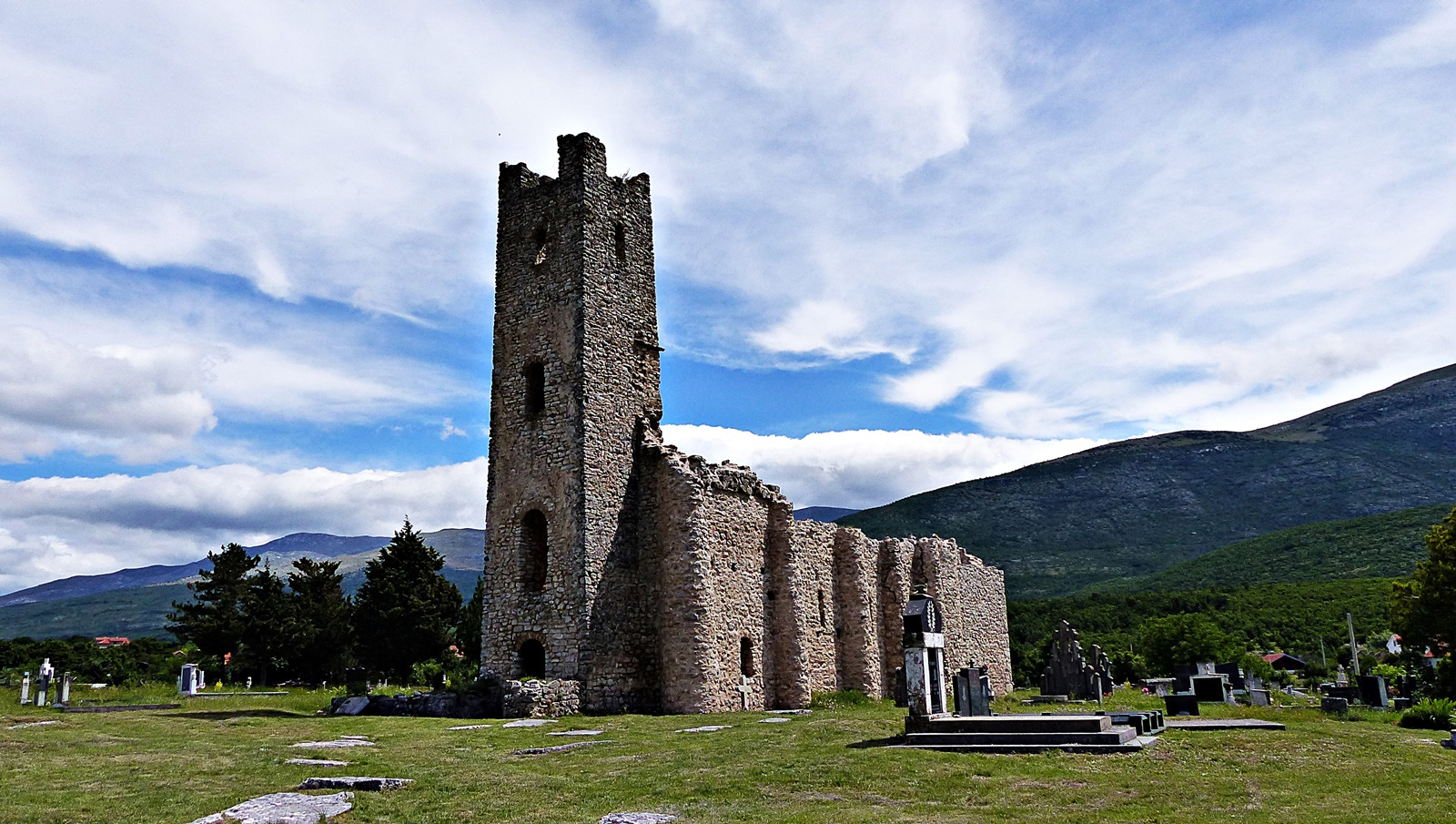
Late 9th century Church of Holy Salvation with a Carolingian westwork, built at the time of duke Branimir of Croatia.

From the middle of the seventh century until the unification in 925, there were two duchies on the territory of today's Croatia, Duchy of Croatia and Principality of Lower Pannonia. Eventually, a dukedom was formed, the Duchy of Croatia, ruled by Borna, as attested by chronicles of Einhard starting in the year 818. The record represents the first documented Croatian realms, vassal states of Francia at the time. The most important ruler of Lower Pannonia was Ljudevit Posavski, who revolted against the Franks between 819 and 823. He ruled Pannonian Croatia from 810 to 823.

The Frankish overlordship ended during the reign of Mislav two decades later. Duke Mislav was succeeded by Duke Trpimir, the founder of the Trpimirović dynasty. Trpimir successfully fought against Byzantium, Venice and Bulgaria. Duke Trpimir was succeeded by Duke Domagoj, who repeatedly led wars against the Venetians and the Byzantines, for which the Venetians called this Croatian ruler "the worst Croatian prince" (dux pessimus Croatorum) According to Constantine VII, the Christianization of Croats began in the 7th century, but the claim is disputed and generally, Christianization is associated with the 9th century. In 879, under Branimir, the duke of Croatia, Dalmatian Croatia received papal recognition as a state from Pope John VIII.

== Kingdom of Croatia (925–1102) ==
A map of 10th-century Croatian counties (županije), as they were mentioned in De Administrando Imperio.

The first king of Croatia is generally considered to have been Tomislav in the first half of the 10th century, who is mentioned as such in notes from Church Councils of Split and the letter of Pope John X.

Important Croatian rulers from that period are:

- Mihajlo Krešimir II, 949–969, who conquered Bosnia and restored the power of the Croatian kingdom. Two Croatian queens are also known from 10th century. The first one is Domaslava and the second one is Helen of Zadar, whose epitaph was found in the Solin area at the end of the 19th century during archaeological excavations conducted by Frane Bulić. The latter was also a mother of King Stjepan Držislav, 969–997. He sided with Byzantium in a war against Bulgarian emperor Samuil, so Bulgarians, in response, raided Croatia and ravaged it as far as Zadar before retreating back to Ohrid. Byzantine emperor Basil II in return named Stjepan Držislav a hereditary King of Croatia and Dalmatia and sent him royal insignia.
- Stjepan, 1030–1058, restored the Croatian kingdom and founded the diocese in Knin.

The medieval Croatian kingdom reached its peak in the 11th century during the reigns of Petar Krešimir IV (1058–1074) and Demetrius Zvonimir (1075–1089). From the time of Petar Krešimir IV kingdom was officially called "Kingdom of Croatia and Dalmatia". He used The Great Schism of 1054 which weakened the Byzantine rule over Dalmatian cities to assert his own control over them. He left the cities a certain amount of self-rule, but also collected a certain amount of tribute and demanded their ships in the case of war. Except for croatization of old cities such as Zadar and Split, Petar Krešimir IV encouraged the development of new cities such as Biograd, Nin, Karin, Skradin and Šibenik. He also encouraged the foundation of new monasteries and gave donations to the Church. Historians such as Trpimir Macan consider that during Krešimir's reign medieval Croatian kingdom reached its greatest extent. Modern historians also consider that his rule probably ended when he was captured by Norman count Amicus of Giovinazzo.

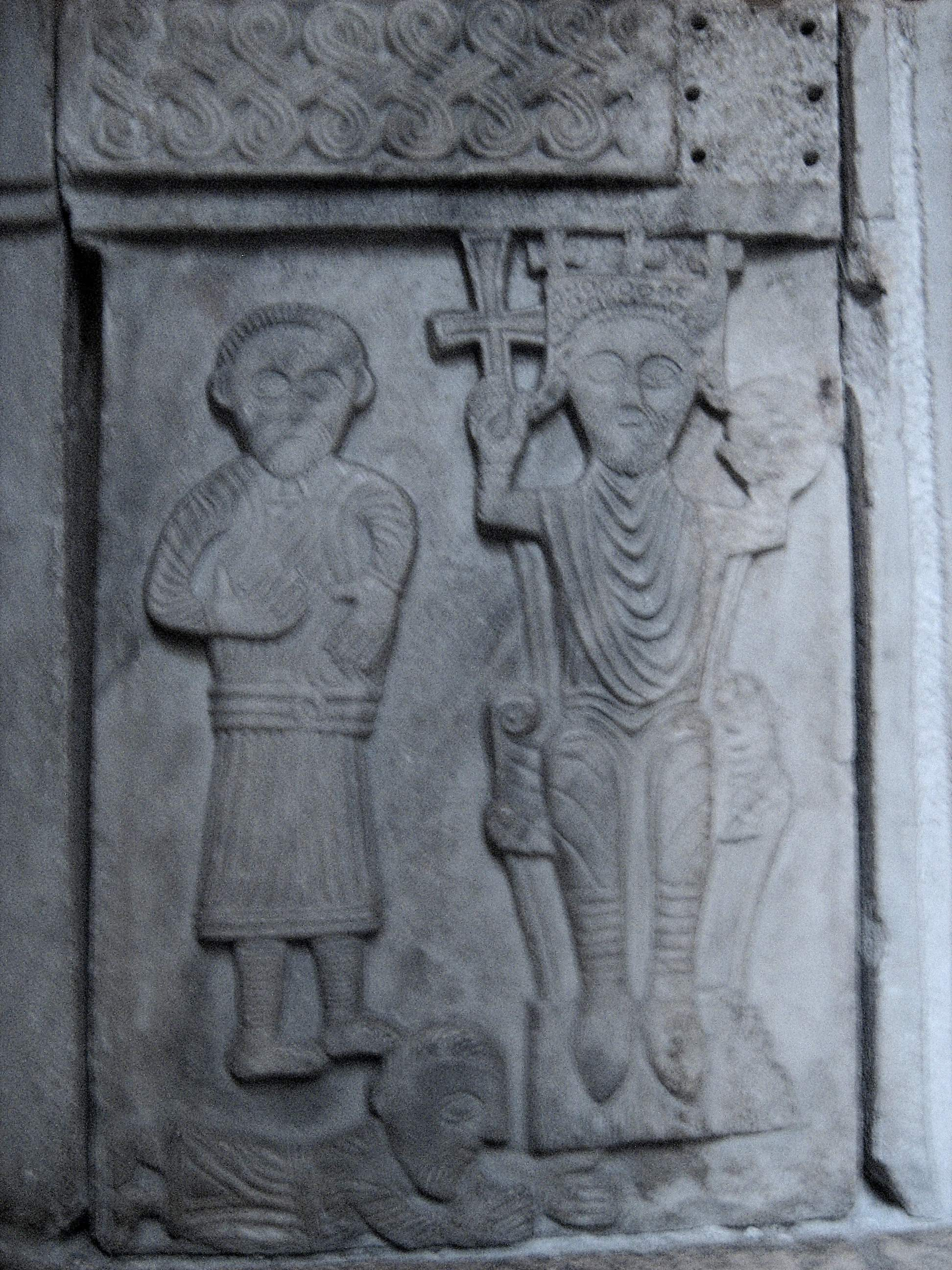
The Split pluteus with the figure of a king, dating from the 11th century. It is hypothesized to depict a Croatian king, probably Petar Krešimir IV or Zvonimir. It was originally situated in Hollow Church.

I Demetrius, also called Zvonimir, by God's mercy duke of Croatia whom you Gebizon - the deputy of Holy See, after receiving the authority from our pope Gregory [...] crowned with a flag, sword, scepter and crown [...] - I pledge to you [...] to fullfill everything His Honourable Holiness orders me. [...] I shall respect justice, defend the churches, take care of everything that belongs to Church, [...] I shall protect the poor, widows and impoverished [...] I shall object to selling people [...] After counselling with my best men I order that each year on Easter my kingdom pays a tribute of 200 Byzantine golden coins to the Saint Peter and I confirm that this will be continued forever by those who succeed me. [...] I also donate and confirm the monastery of St. Gregory, also called Vrana with all its treasures to the Holy See, that is; with a silver box, [...] two crosses, grail, [...] and two golden crowns decorated by jewelry [...] may it forever be a resting place for the deputies of the Holy See and in their complete control [...] which I as well as my successors shall defend. -

— king Zvonimir's coronation oath,

Krešimir IV was succeeded by Demetrius Zvonimir who married Hungarian princess Helen and ruled from Knin as his capital. Zvonimir's rule was marked by stability. He was a papal vassal and enjoyed a papal protection as seen when his kingdom was threatened by an invasion of knight Wezelin, who was deterred after pope threatened to excommunicate him. He had a son named Radovan who died at young age, so Zvonimir left no male heir when he died in 1089.

Meanwhile, in 1096, a group of crusaders led by Raymond of Toulouse going on first crusade passed through mountainous parts of Croatia. The crusaders were met with hostile locals who attacked crusader columns, while Raymond of Toulouse brutally retaliated by mutilating those attackers whom they managed to capture. Historians explains these hostilities by the "state of anarchy" which was then in Croatia.

=== Interregnum ===
King Zvonimir was succeeded by Stjepan II who died in 1091, ending the Trpimirović dynasty. As Kingdom of Croatia descended in another feudal power struggle, Zvonimir's widow Jelena (Helen), who was the daughter of Hungarian king Béla I, invited her brother Ladislaus I of Hungary to come to Croatia and claim Croatian royal crown. Meanwhile, in Croatia, Petar Snačić, another pretender to the royal throne arose, but his army was defeated by Hungarians in Battle of Gvozd Mountain where Snačić was killed. Hungarian king Coloman continued to lay claims on throne of Croatia and eventually a personal union between Croatia and Hungary was created in 1102 with Hungarian king as its ruler. This meant that Croatia and Hungary still remained separate kingdoms which are connected only by a common king, therefore from the reign of Coloman onwards, Hungarian kings bore official title of "king of Hungary, Dalmatia and Croatia". Another example was a coronation process as new kings of Hungary continued to be separately crowned kings of Croatia from the times of Coloman, until Andrew II. There was also an institution of ban (viceroy) of Croatia representing a royal deputy, separate tax system, money and army. According to one group of historians, during this interregnum, Croatia was simply conquered by Hungarians, while another group of historians thinks that king Coloman and Croatian nobility possibly reached some kind of agreement.

== Personal union with Hungary (1102–1527) and the Republic of Venice ==
=== Croatia under the Árpád dynasty ===
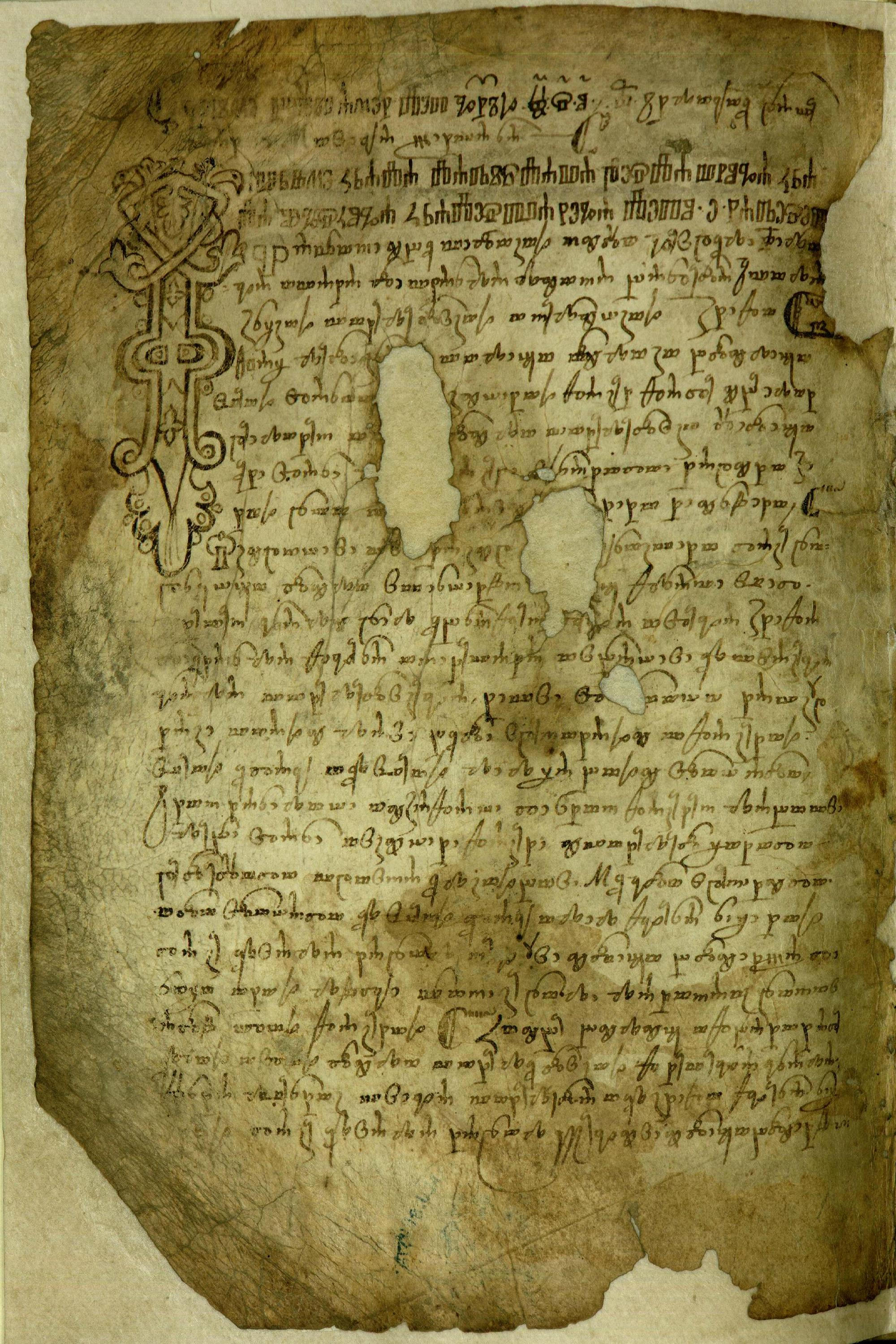
The Law Code of Vinodol from 1288, written in Glagolitic script, is the earliest legal text written in the Croatian language. This code regulated relations between inhabitants of the town of Vinodol and their overlords, the counts of Krk.

One consequence of entering a personal union with Hungary under the Hungarian king was the introduction of a feudal system. Later kings sought to restore some of their influence by giving certain privileges to the towns. Somewhere between Second and Third Crusade, Knights Templars and Hospitallers appeared in Croatian lands for the first time. According to historian Lelja Dobronić the purpose of their arrival appears to be to secure transport routes and protect travelers going from Europe towards the Middle East.

After the proclamation of the Fourth crusade in 1202, the crusader army could not afford to pay the agreed amount of money to the Venetians who were supposed to provide the maritime transport to the Holy Land. The Venetians in turn requested that the crusaders compensate this difference by capturing the town of Zadar (Zara) which was then supposed to be handed over to Venice. The pope issued sharp warnings against this kind of attack and some crusaders refused to participate. When the Venetian-crusader army arrived before Zadar, its citizens posted signs of cross on their town walls to demonstrate their catholic faith. Despite everything, in November 1202 the crusader-Venetian army launched an attack on Zadar, captured it and then looted it. In response, Pope excommunicated the entire crusader army. Hungarian-Croatian king Emeric also provided no real help to the town. He merely wrote a letter to the pope Innocent III, where he asked him to make the crusaders return Zadar to its legitimate ruler.

In year 1217, the Hungarian king Andrew II took the sign of the cross and vowed to go on the Fifth Crusade. After assembling his army king marched by so-called "via exercitualis" (English: the military road) from Hungary proper southwards to Koprivnica and further towards: Križevci, Zagreb, Topusko, Bihać and then Knin, eventually reaching town of Split on the Adriatic coast. As Andrew lacked needed naval fleet to take his army to the Holy Land, he decided to arrange transport with Venetians. In return, Andrew II decided to completely give up the Hungarian kings' rights on Zadar, whom Venetians had captured during the Fourth crusade. After staying in Split for three weeks for logistical reasons and realising that Croatians will not be joining his crusade, king and his army sailed off to the Holy Land. Historian Krešimir Kužić attributes this low desire of Croatians to join king Andrew's crusade to earlier bad memories related to destruction and looting of Zadar in 1202. When king Andrew II returned from the crusade, he brought back a number of relics, some of which remain stored in the treasury of Zagreb Cathedral.

Andrew's son King Béla IV was forced to deal with troubles brought by the first Mongol invasion of Hungary. Following the Hungarian defeat in the Battle of the Sajó River in 1241, the king withdrew to Dalmatia, hoping to take refuge there, with the Mongols in pursuit. The Mongol army followed the king to Split hinterland, which they ravaged. The king took refuge in nearby town of Trogir, hoping to make use of its island-like fort which offered some protection from Mongol onslaught.

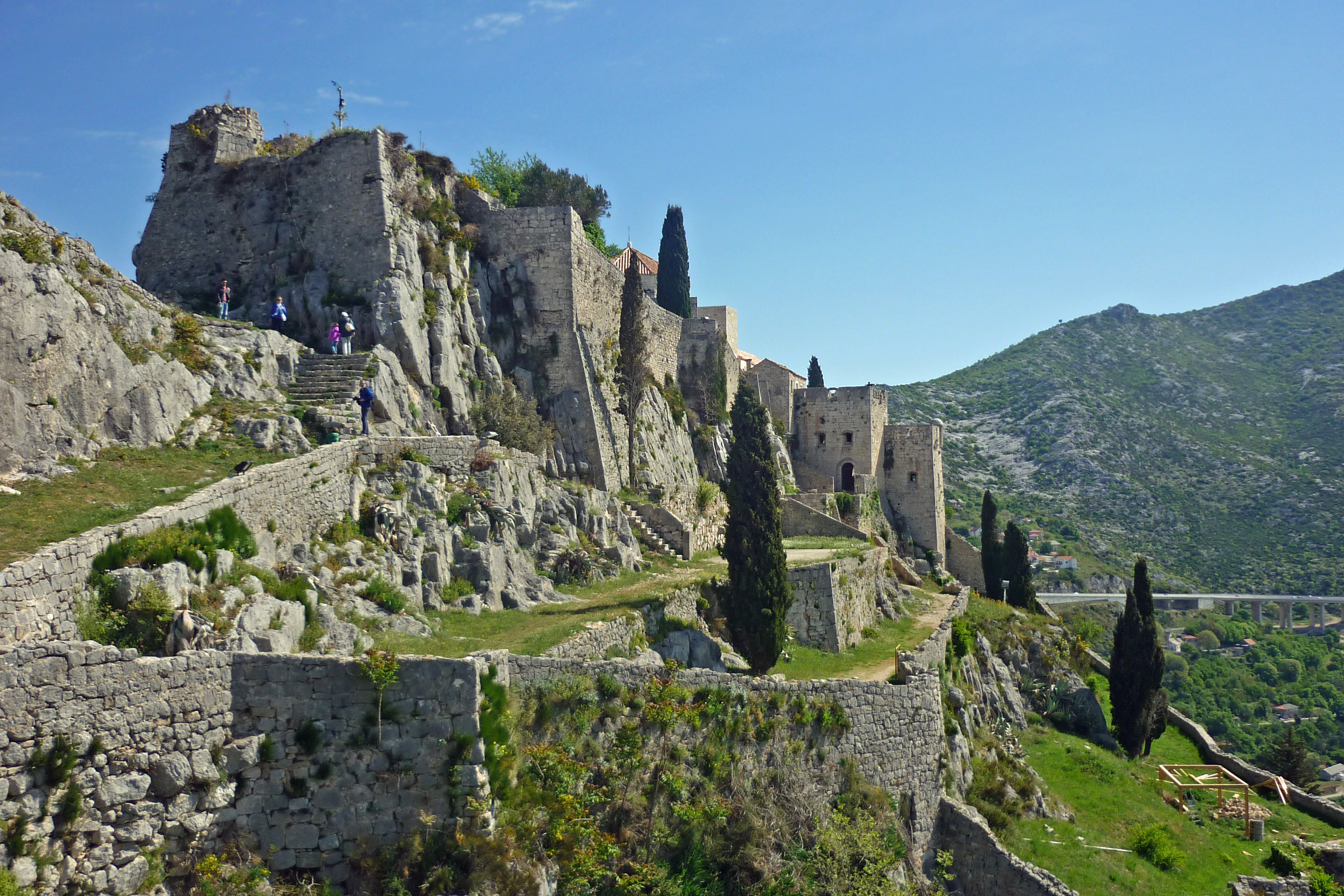
Klis Fortress in the hinterland of town of Split was one of the places that saw action during the First Mongol invasion of Hungary in 1242.

Meanwhile, Mongols thinking that the king was hiding in Klis fortress attempted to scale the steep cliffs of Klis, while the fort defenders hurled rocks on their heads. Eventually hand-to-hand combat ensued inside the fortress, but upon realising that king wasn't there, the Mongols abandoned their attempts to take the fort and headed towards Trogir. As Mongols prepared to attack Trogir, King Bela prepared boats in an attempt to flee across the sea.

This decisive Mongol attack on Trogir never happened as they withdrew upon receiving news about the death of Ögedei Khan. As Croatian historian Damir Karbić notes, during Béla's stay in Dalmatia, members of the Šubić noble family earned merit for sheltering him, so in return, the king granted them the County of Bribir in hereditary possession, where their power grew until reached the peak in the time of Paul I Šubić of Bribir. This period, therefore, saw the rise of the Frankopans and the Šubićs, native nobility, to prominence. Numerous future Bans of Croatia originated from these two noble families. The princes of Bribir from the Šubić family became particularly influential, as they asserted their control over large parts of Dalmatia, Slavonia, and even Bosnia.

=== Croatia under the Anjou dynasty ===
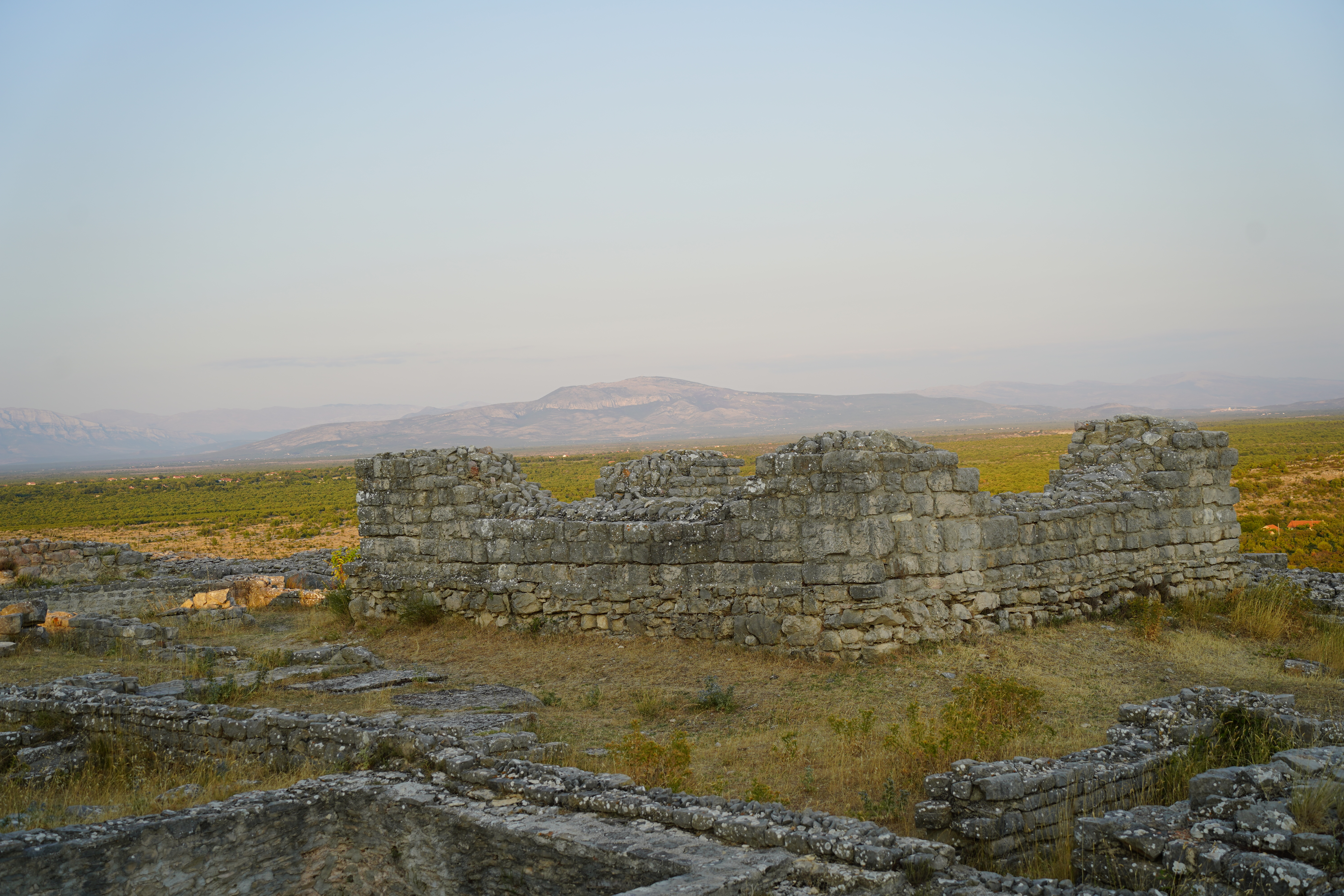
One of the seats of 14th-century magnate Paul Šubić, in Bribir. Paul held the hereditary titles of the Ban of Croatia and Lord of Bosnia. Croatian historians sometimes refer to Paul as "the uncrowned king of Croatia".

By the early 14th century lord Paul Šubić accumulated so much power, that he ruled as a de facto independent ruler. He coined his own money and held the hereditary title of Ban of Croatia. Following the death of king Ladislaus IV of Hungary, who had no male heir, a succession crisis emerged, and in 1300, Paul invited Charles Robert of Anjou to come to the Kingdom of Hungary and take over its royal seat. A civil war ensued, in which Charles' party prevailed after winning a decisive victory in the Battle of Rozgony in 1312.

Coronations of the kings of Croatia gradually fell into abeyance as a custom. Charles Robert was the last to be separately crowned as King of Croatia in 1301, after which Croatia had a separate constitution. Lord Paul Šubić died in 1312, and his son Mladen inherited the title of Ban of Croatia. Mladen's power was diminished due to the new king's policy of centralization, after he and his forces were defeated by the royal army and its allies in the Battle of Bliska in 1322. The power vacuum caused by the downfall of Mladen Šubić was used by Venice to reassert control over Dalmatian cities. Following downfall of Croatian magnates and restoration of royal authority over Croatia, around 1350, first instance of Croatian-Dalmatian Assembly (hrvatski Sabor), attested by historical sources, took place near Benkovac. The assembly was summoned by ban of Croatia in August and it gathered members of twelve Croatian noble families. In subsequent period, the Croatian-Dalmatian assembly most often took place in Knin.

The ensuing reign of King Louis the Great (1342–1382) is considered the golden age of medieval Croatian history. Louis launched a campaign against Venice, with aim of retaking Dalmatian cities, and eventually succeeded, forcing Venice to sign the Treaty of Zadar in 1358. The same peace treaty caused the Republic of Ragusa to gain independence from Venice.

=== Anti-Court struggles period ===
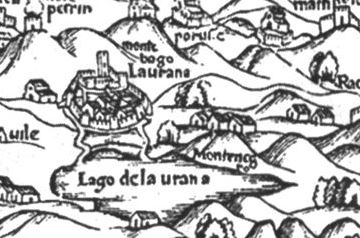
A 16th century depiction of Vrana monastery, seat of John of Palisna.

After King Louis The Great died in 1382, the Kingdom of Hungary and Croatia descended into a period of destructive dynastic struggles called The Anti-Court movement. The struggle was waged between two factions, one of which was centered around late king's daughter Mary, her mother Queen Elizabeth, and her fiancé Sigismund of Luxemburg. The faction which opposed them was a coalition of Croatian nobility which supported Charles of Durazzo to become a new king of Hungary and Croatia. This faction consisted of powerful John of Palisna, and Horvat brothers, who opposed the idea of being ruled by a female and, secondly, of being ruled by Sigismund of Luxemburg whom they considered alien. As alternative, they arranged for Charles of Durazzo to come to Croatia and crowned him as new king of Hungary-Croatia in Szekezfehervar in December 1385. Charles' opponents - queen Elizabeth and princess Mary, responded by organizing Charles' assassination in Buda in February 1386. Enraged anti-court supporters then retaliated by making an ambush for two queens near Gorjani in July 1386, where their escort was eliminated and both queens were taken to captivity in Novigrad Castle near Zadar. Once in Novigrad, queen Elizabeth was strangled to death, but her daughter Mary was eventually rescued by her fiancé Sigismund.

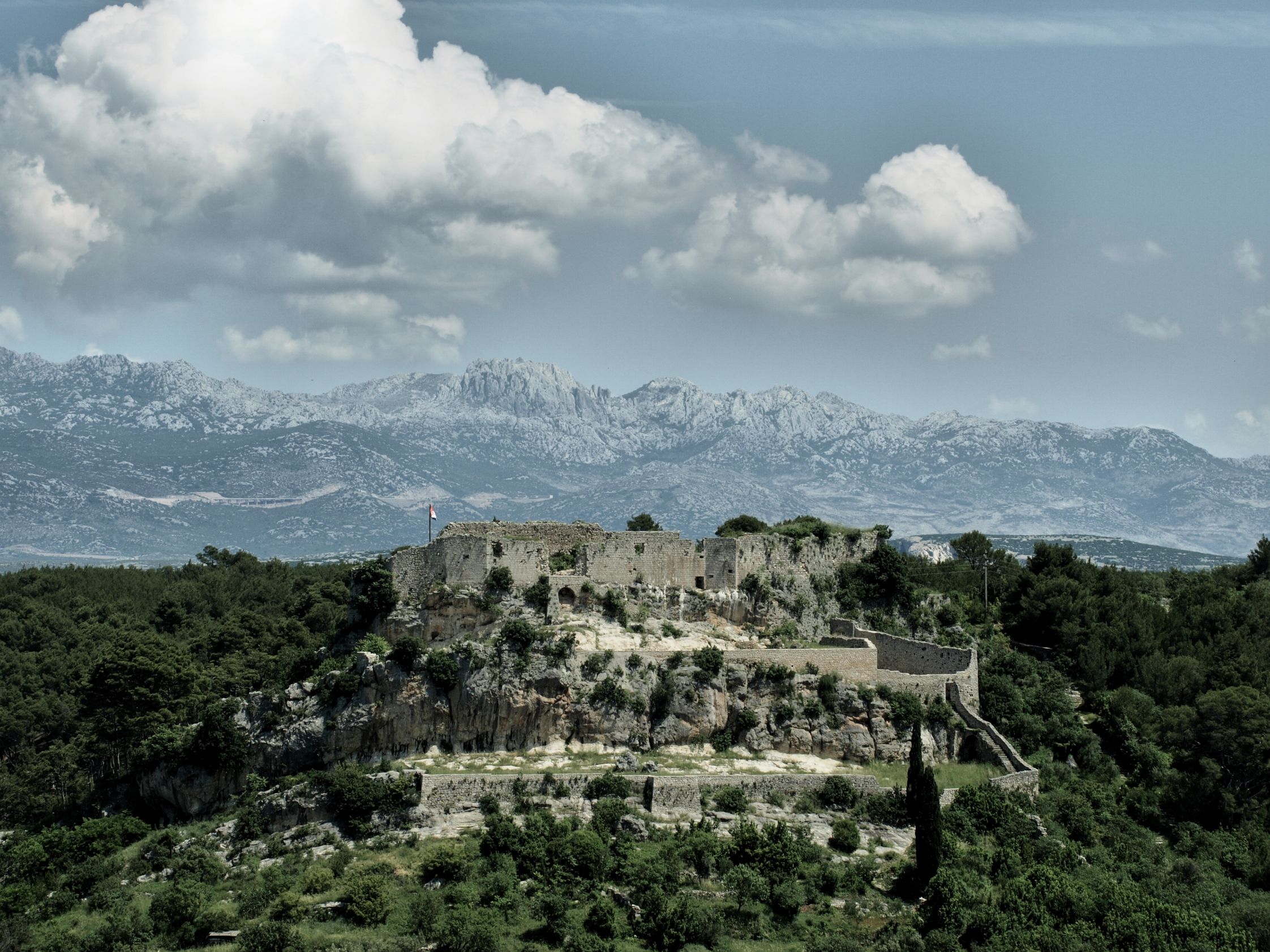
Novigrad Castle, near Zadar was a place where anti-court supporters held queens Mary and Elizabeth in captivity. Velebit mountain can be seen in castle's background.

In 1387, Sigismund of Luxemburg crowned himself a new king of Hungary-Croatia. In following period he too became engaged in power struggle against opposing Croatian and Bosnian nobility in order to assert his rule over the realm. In 1396, Sigismund organized a crusade against the expanding Ottomans which culminated in Battle of Nicopolis. When the battle ended, it was unclear whether Sigismund got out alive or not, so Stephen II Lackfi proclaimed Ladislaus of Naples a new king of Hungary-Croatia. When Sigismund, nonetheless did returned to Croatia, he summoned diet in Križevci in 1397, where he confronted his adversaries and eliminated them. Sigismund was again forced fight for the control, but by 1403 entire southern Croatia and Dalmatian cities defected to Ladislaus of Naples. Sigismund eventually managed to crush anti-court movement by winning 1408 Battle of Dobor in Bosnia. Since anti-king Ladislaus lost hope of prevailing in struggle against Sigismund, he sold all his nominal possessions in Dalmatia to Republic of Venice for 100 000 Ducats in 1409. The Venetians asserted their control over most of Dalmatia by 1428. The rule of Venice over most of Dalmatia continued on for nearly four centuries (c. 1420–1797) until the end of The Republic by Treaty of Campo Formio. Another long term consequence of Anti-Court struggles was arrival of Ottomans to neighbouring Kingdom of Bosnia at the invite of powerful Bosnian duke Hrvoje Vukčić Hrvatinić to help him fight against forces of king Sigismund. The Ottomans gradually strengthened their influence in Bosnia until finally completely conquering the kingdom in 1463.

=== Ottoman invasions ===
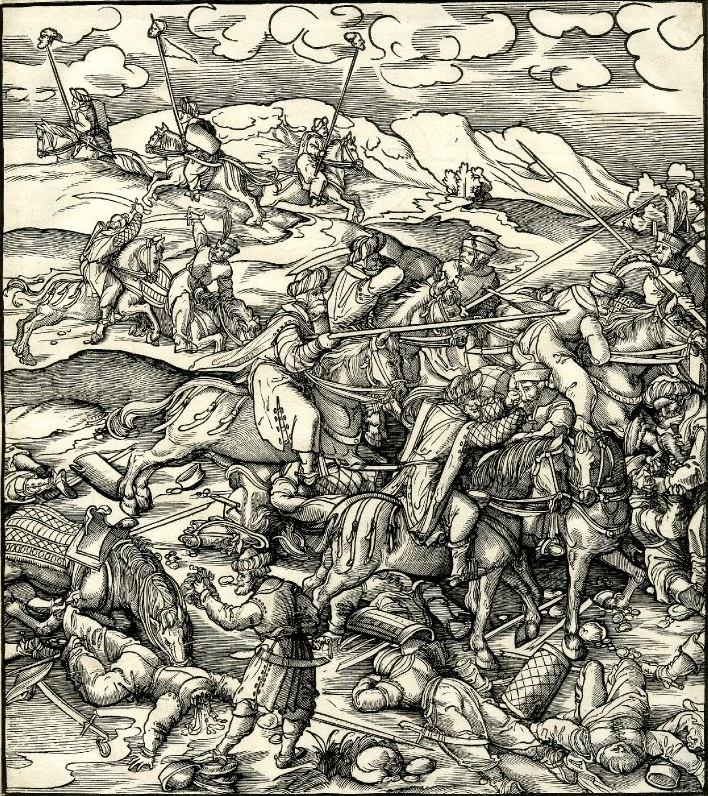
The woodcut by Leonhard Beck, from c. 1515, depicts the Battle of Krbava Field between the Army of Croatian nobility and Ottoman akinjis.

Serious Ottoman attacks on Croatian lands began after the fall of Bosnia to the Ottomans in 1463. At this point main Ottoman attacks were not yet directed towards Central Europe, with Vienna as its main objective, but towards renaissance Italy with Croatia standing on their way between. As the Ottomans launched expansion further into Europe, Croatian lands became a place of permanent warfare. This period of history is considered to be one of the direst for the people living in Croatia. Baroque poet Pavao Ritter Vitezović subsequently described this period of Croatian history as "two centuries of weeping Croatia".

Armies of Croatian nobility fought numerous battles to counter the Ottoman akinji and martolos raids. The Ottoman forces frequently raided the Croatian countryside, plundering towns and villages and captured the local inhabitants as slaves. These "scorched earth" tactics, also called "The Small War", were usually conducted once a year with intention to soften up the region's defenses, but didn't result in actual conquest of territory. According to historian James Tracy, the armies Croatian ban could muster proved too few to counter akinji raids along the long border with the Ottoman Empire. On the other hand, armies of Croatian nobility could never mobilize fast enough to intercept akinji raids "head on", instead, Croatians hoped to intercept Ottoman raiders on their return, as they were slowed down by their booty and hostages.

And after conquering Greece and Bulgaria, Bosnia and Albania, [Turks] flocked onto people of Croatia by sending many armies. Many warlords started frequent battles with Christian people fighting on the fields and in mountain passes and on river fords. That's when all Croatian and Slavonian lands were enslaved all the way to Sava river and Drava and even Mons Claudius, all settlements of Carniola all the way to sea, by enslaving, robbing, burning houses of Lord and crushing Lord's altars. They attacked old people using weapons, young women [...] widows and even squealing children; not only that they took people of God in violent sorrow, shackled in chains, but they also sold people on markets like it is accustomed to do with the cattle.

— The Record of Father Martinac, 15th century Croatian scribe

Frequent Ottoman raids eventually led to the 1493 Battle of Krbava field which ended in Croatian defeat. Meanwhile, after king Mathias Corvinus died in 1490, a succession war ensued, where supporters of Vladislaus II prevailed over those of Maximilian Habsburg, another contester to the throne of Kingdom of Hungary-Croatia. Maximilian gained many supporters among Croatian nobility and a favourable peace treaty he concluded with Vladislaus enabled Croatians to increasingly turn towards Habsburgs when seeking protections from the Ottoman attacks, as their lawful king Vladislaus turned out unable to protect his subjects in Croatia. On same year, the estates of Croatia also declined to recognize Vladislaus II as a ruler until he had taken an oath to respect their liberties and insisted that he strike from the constitution certain phrases which seemed to reduce Croatia to the rank of a mere province. The dispute was resolved in 1492 when according to Lujo Margetić, king Vladislaus recognised the autonomy of both Croatia and Slavonia, whose nobility gave a separate confirmation to the succession agreement between Vladislaus and the house of Habsburg, enabling Croatians and Slavonians to have their say in future interregnum periods.

== Croatia in the Habsburg monarchy (1527–1918) ==
A decisive battle between Hungarian army and the Ottomans occurred on Mohács in 1526, where Hungarian king Louis II was killed and his army was destroyed. As a consequence, in November of the same year, the Hungarian parliament elected János Szapolyai as the new king of Hungary. In December 1526, another Hungarian parliament elected Ferdinand Habsburg as King of Hungary.

=== 1527 Cetingrad Assembly ===
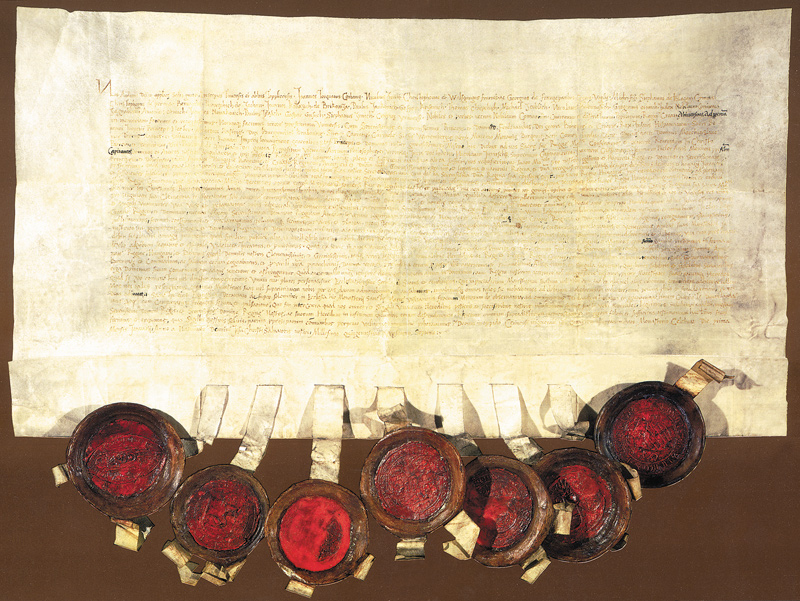
The 1527 Cetingrad Charter, preserved in the National Archives of Austria contains seals of most distinguished Croatian nobles such as: Ivan Karlović, Nikola III Zrinski as well as seal with Croatian checkerboard.

According to historian Milan Kruhek, the crucial decision determining next four centuries of Croatian history happened when Croatian nobles assembled in Cetingrad in 1527 and chose Ferdinand I of the House of Habsburg as the new ruler of Croatia. Albeit Habsburg delegation composed of Pavao Oberstein, Nikola Jurišić and Ivan Puchler arrived in Cetingrad, Croatia, as early as Christmas Eve 1526, they had to wait, as Croat high dignitaries spent Christmas holidays at home. After finally assemblying on New Year's Eve 1526, Croats publicly proclaimed their decision at a Mass held the next day at the Franciscan Monastery in Cetin. In turn, the present Habsburg delegation confirmed that new Habsburg rulers would contribute to the defense of Croatia against the Ottomans and respect its political rights.

An Assembly of neighbouring Slavonia, on the other hand, elected Szapolyai. A civil war between the two rival kings ensued, but later both crowns united as the Habsburgs prevailed over Szapolyai. The Ottoman Empire used these instabilities to expand in the 16th century to include most of Slavonia, western Bosnia (then called Turkish Croatia), and Lika. Those territories initially made up part of Rumelia Eyalet, and subsequently parts of Budin Eyalet, Bosnia Eyalet, and Kanije Eyalet.

=== Remnants of the remnants ===
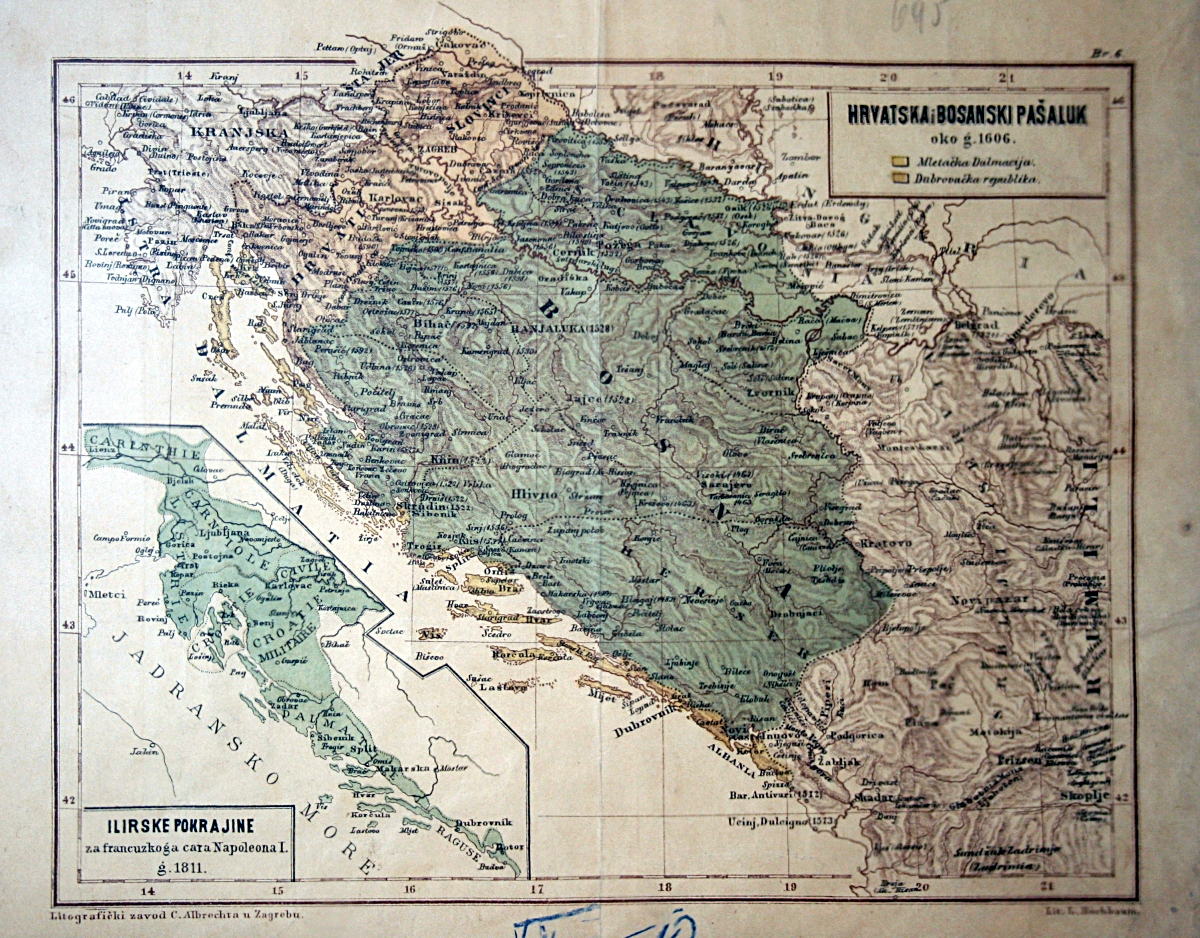
"Remnants of the Remnants" (Reliquiae Reliquiarum), shown on this map in yellow, represent the territory under the jurisdiction of Croatian-Slavonian Sabor at the height of the Ottoman advance

Croats and Slavonians fought an increasing number of battles, but lost increasing swathes of territory to the Ottoman Empire, until being reduced to what is commonly called in Croatian historiography the "Remains of the Remains of Once Glorious Croatian Kingdom" (Reliquiae reliquiarum olim inclyti regni Croatiae), or simply the "Remains of the Remains". By the late 16th century Remnants of the Remnants stretched at around 18200 square kilometers. The eastern border towards the Ottoman Empire went through the Pitomača - Rača - Moslavina line. The southern border towards the Ottoman Empire ran just below the line Sisak - Petrinja - Karlovac and continued southwest towards the Adriatic. The western border towards Carniola and Styria were rivers Kupa and Sutla, while Mura and Drava rivers made frontier towards the Hungary.

==== Amalgamation of medieval Croatia and medieval Slavonia ====
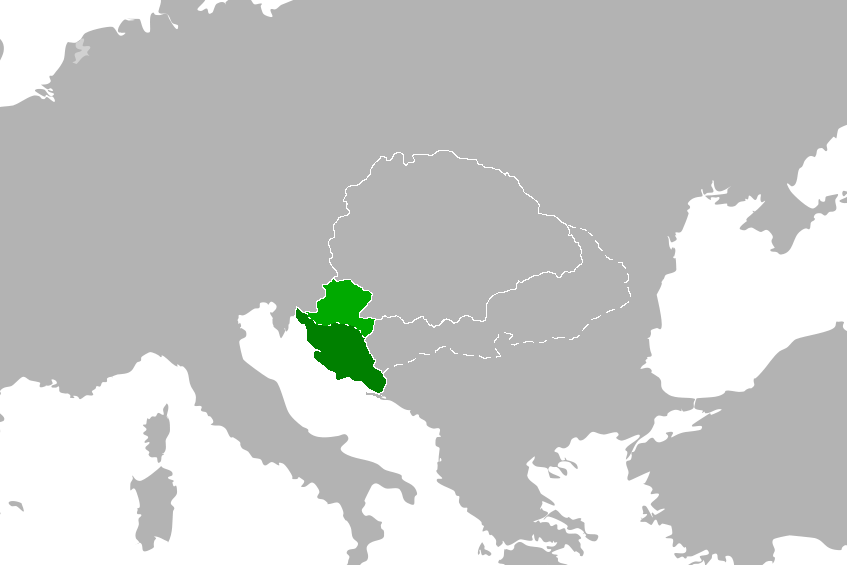
Medieval Croatia (dark green) south of Gvozd Mountain shown in relation to medieval Slavonia (green) centered around Diocese of Zagreb.

The area spanning between rivers Sava and Drava on north–south axis and river Sutla and Požega valley on west–east axis, during medieval period came to be known as Slavonia. Its first recorded Assembly of nobles was held in 1273 in Zagreb. While Slavonia shared certain ties with medieval Croatia, it was more tightly connected to Hungary than Croatia Proper was. In 15th century, during the rule of Vladislaus Jagiellon, Slavonia was granted the status of Kingdom. At the same time, ongoing Ottoman attacks on Croatia, coupled with famines, diseases, and a cold climate, led to widespread depopulation and a refugee crisis as people fled to safer areas. Croatian historian Ivan Jurković points out that due to the combination of these factors, Croatia "lost almost three-fifths of its population" and the compactness of its territory. Consequently, the center of the medieval Croatian state gradually shifted northwards into western Slavonia, around Zagreb. As both nobility and commoners migrated from Croatia to Slavonia, the territory also gradually began to be called Croatia. On 1 September 1558, due to Ottoman pressure, the two assemblies of Kingdom of Slavonia and Kingdom of Croatia were permanently merged into one single assembly then called The Assembly of Kingdom of Croatia and Slavonia (Croatian: Sabor Kraljevine Hrvatske i Slavonije), held in Zagreb. At an assembly session held on 7 March 1577, Zagreb was for the first time called the capital city of Croatia-Slavonia.

==== Formation of Military Frontier ====
Later in 16th century, Croatia was so weak that its parliament authorized Ferdinand Habsburg to carve out large areas of Croatia and Slavonia adjacent to the Ottoman Empire for the creation of the Military Frontier (Vojna Krajina, German: Militaergrenze) - a buffer zone for the Ottoman Empire managed directly by the Imperial War Council in Austria. This buffer area became devastated and depopulated due to constant warfare and was subsequently settled by Serbs, Vlachs, Croats, and Germans. As a result of their compulsory military service to the Habsburg Empire during the conflict with the Ottoman Empire, the population in the Military Frontier was free of serfdom and enjoyed much political autonomy, unlike the population living in the parts managed by the Croatian Ban and Sabor. They were considered free peasant-soldiers who were granted land without the usual feudal obligations, except for the military service. This was officially confirmed by an Imperial decree of 1630 called Statuta Valachorum (Vlach Statutes).

The territory of Military Frontier was initially subdivided into Slavonian Frontier (subsequently known as Varaždin Generalate), Croatian Frontier (subsequently known as Karlovac Generalate) and Žumberak District. The area between villages of Bović and Brkiševina was called Banska Krajina (or subsequently Banovina, Banija). The difference between latter and remaining Military Frontier was that Banska krajina (Ban's Frontier) was under command and financing of ban of Croatia so its defense was basically the responsibility of Croatia. Unlike remaining Military Frontier which was under direct command of Imperial Military Authorities, Banska Krajina was not taken away from Croatia.

==== The Long War: Hasan Pasha's Great Offensive ====
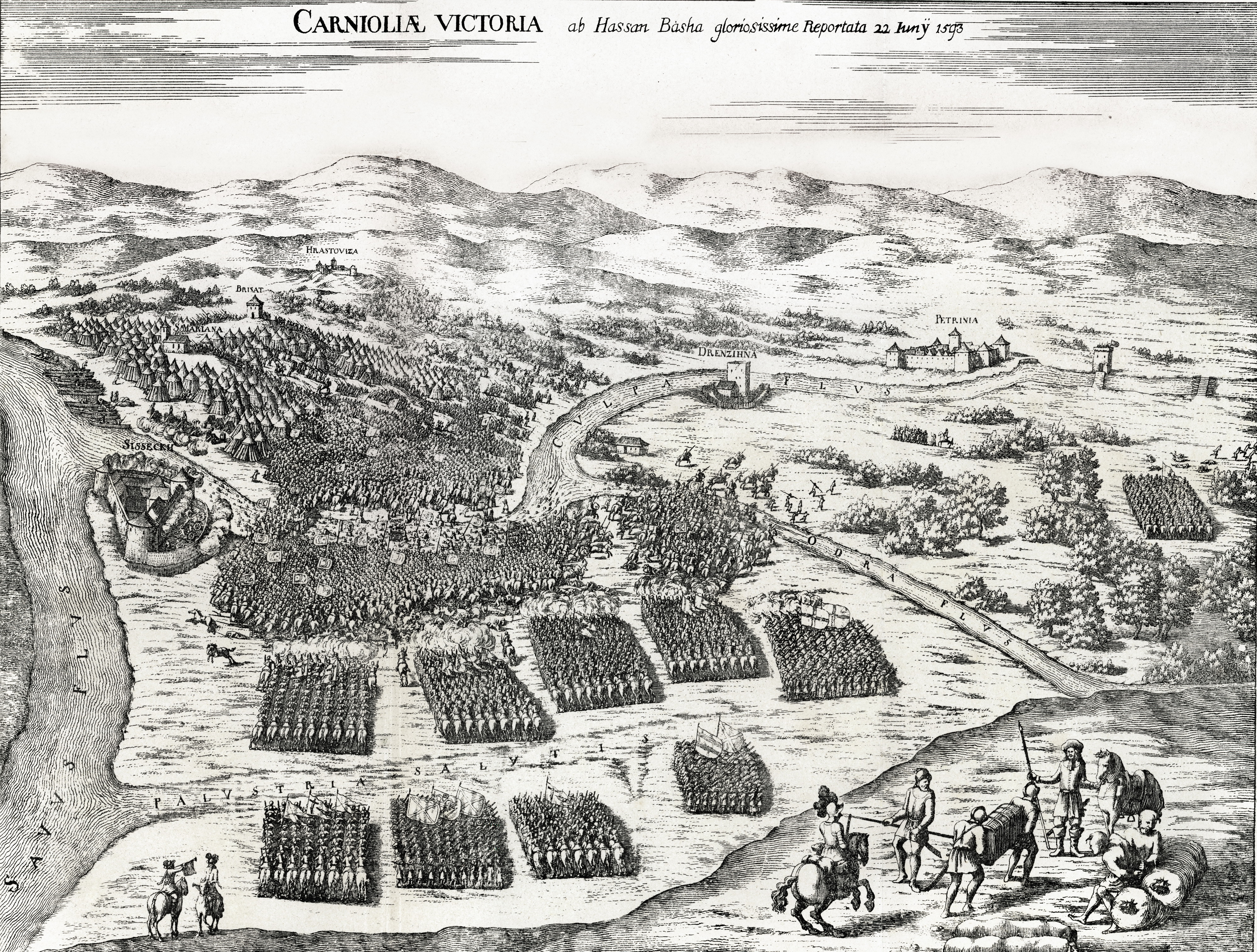
The climax of Hasan Pasha's Great Offensive was third Battle of Sisak on 22 June 1593. The battle is depicted here by Johann Weikhard von Valvasor.

As Ottomans concluded their War against Safavid Persia in 1590, the belligerent Teli Hasan Pasha was appointed new governor of Ottoman Bosnian Eyalet. He launched his great offensive on Croatia, aimed at completely conquering Croatian "Remnants of the Remnants". In order to do that, he mobilized all available troops from his Bosnian Eyalet. Although his offensive did achieve substantial success against Croatians and their allies, such as victories in Siege of Bihać (which Croatians never managed to retake) or in Battle of Brest, his campaign was ultimately stopped at the June 1593 Battle of Sisak. The Ottomans lost this battle, and Hasan Pasha was killed in the fray. News of Bosnian Pasha's defeat near Sisak caused outrage in Constantinople, leading the Ottomans officially to declare war on the Habsburg Monarchy, triggering the start of Long Turkish War. In strategic sense, the Ottoman defeat near Sisak led to stabilization of the border between Croatia and the Ottoman Empire. Historian Nenad Moačanin claims that this stability of Croatian-Ottoman border was a general characteristic of the 17th century, as the Ottoman Empire's might started declining.

=== Zrinski-Frankopan conspiracy ===
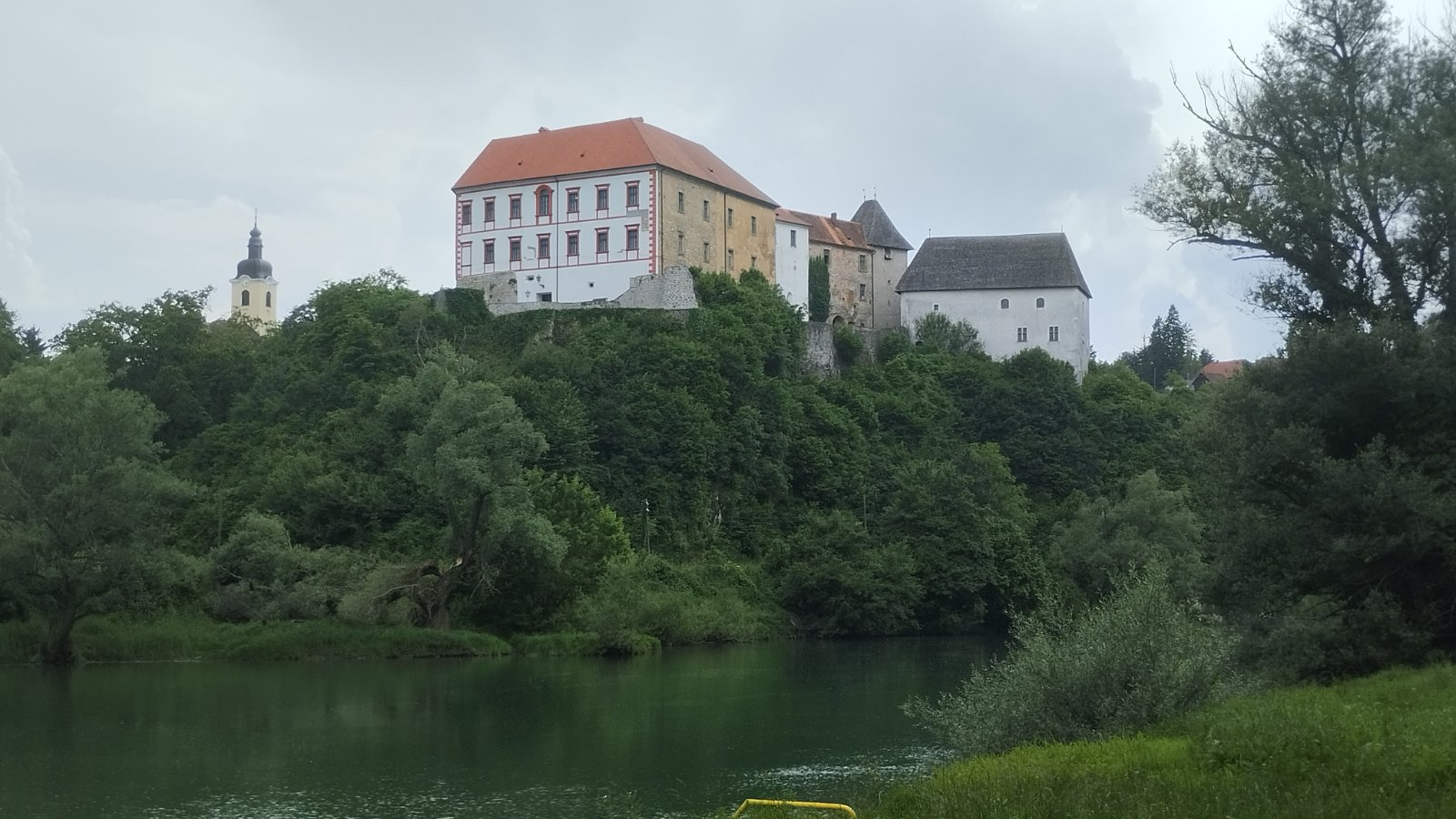
Ozalj Castle - one of Zrinski-Frankopan conspirators center and a center of Ozalj literary-linguistic circle which produced Croatian baroque literature such as: Putni tovaruš, Gazophylacium or Gartlic za čas kratiti.

During the 17th century, distinguished Croatian noble Nikola Zrinski became one of the most prominent Croatian generals in the fight against the Ottomans. In 1663/1664 he led a successful incursion into Ottoman-controlled territory. The campaign ended in the destruction of the vital Osijek bridge, which served as a connection between the Pannonian plain and the Balkan territories. As a reward for his victory against the Ottomans, Zrinski was commended by French king Louis XIV, thereby establishing contact with the French court. Croatian nobility also constructed Novi Zrin castle which sought to protect Croatia and Hungary from further Ottoman advances. At the same time, emperor Leopold of Habsburg sought to impose absolute rule on the entire Habsburg territory, which meant a loss of authority for the Croatian parliament and Ban and caused dissatisfaction with Habsburg rule among Croats.

In July 1664, a large Ottoman army besieged and destroyed Novi Zrin. As this army marched on Austrian lands, its campaign ended at the Battle of St. Gotthard, where it was destroyed by the Habsburg imperial army. Given this victory, Croatians expected a decisive Habsburg counter-offensive to push the Ottomans back and relieve pressure on Croatian lands, but Leopold decided to conclude the unfavorable Vasvar peace treaty with the Ottomans because it solved problems he had on the Rhine with the French at the time. In Croatia, his decision caused outrage among leading nobles and sparked a conspiracy to replace the Habsburgs with different rulers. After Nikola Zrinski died under unusual circumstances while hunting, his relatives Fran Krsto Frankopan and Petar Zrinski supported the conspiracy.

The conspirators established contact with the French, Venetians, Poles, and eventually even the Ottomans, only to be discovered by Habsburg spies at the Ottoman court who served as the sultan's translators. The conspirators were invited to reconcile with the emperor, to which they agreed. However, when they came to Austria, they were charged with high treason and sentenced to death. They were executed in Wiener Neustadt in April 1671. Their families, whose history was intertwined with centuries of Croatian history, were subsequently eradicated by imperial authorities, and all of their possessions were confiscated.

==== Migration of Slavonian name eastwards ====
Friar Luka Ibrišimović, whose monument in Požega can be seen in the picture, was one of the most important allies of Zagreb Diocese in achieving jurisdiction over eastern part of Sava-Drava interfluve. He also took part in Great Turkish War.

During the 17th century, Francisians in eastern part of Sava-Drava interfluve, became unhappy with Franciscan Province of Bosnia, which caused them to turn towards Diocese of Zagreb, in charge of Slavonia. This caused a dispute between Diocese of Zagreb and Francisian Province of Bosnia, in which Diocese of Zagreb attempted to prove that church jurisdiction belongs to them, by claiming that area called Slavonia stretches all the way to Bosut river. The idea was accepted by "separatist" Francisians in the interfleuve. The subsequent victory of Zagreb in this dispute, combined with aspirations of Slavonian-Croatian nobility, as well as new political and demographic realities following Great Turkish War, created a process in which area between Ilova and Bosut river began to be called Slavonia.

=== Great Turkish War: A revived Croatia ===
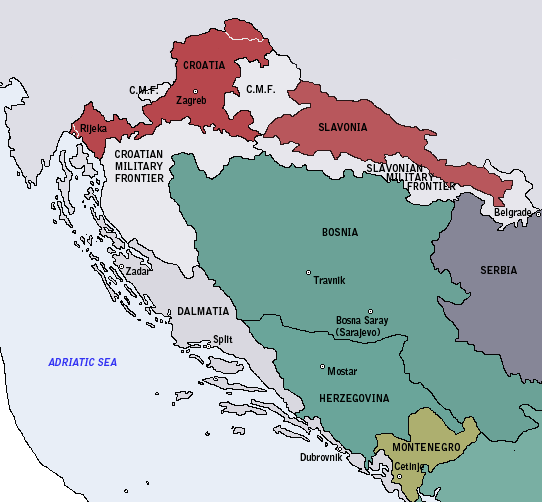
Croatian borders similar to those established with the Peace of Karlowitz in 1699. Although the peace treaty meant relief from Ottoman pressure, Croatia lost the compactness of its territory.

Despite the decline of Ottoman might in the 17th century, the Ottoman high command decided to attack the Habsburg capital of Vienna in 1683, as the Vasvár peace treaty was about to expire. Their attack, however, ended in disaster, and the Ottomans were ultimately routed near Vienna by joint Christian armies defending the city. Soon thereafter, the Holy League was formed and the Great Turkish War was launched. In the Croatian theater of operations, several commanders distinguished themselves, including friar Luka Ibrišimović, whose rebels defeated the Ottomans in Požega, and Marko Mesić, who led the anti-Ottoman uprising in Lika. Hajduk leader Stojan Janković distinguished himself by leading troops in Dalmatia. Croatian Ban Nikola (Miklos) Erdody led his troops in Siege of Virovitica, which was liberated from the Ottomans in 1684. Osijek was liberated by 1687, Kostajnica was liberated by 1688, and Slavonski Brod was liberated by 1691. An attempt to retake Bihać was also made in 1697 but was eventually called off due to lack a of cannons. In the same year, general Eugene of Savoy led a 6500-strong army from Osijek into Bosnia, where he raided the seat of Bosnia Eyalet, Sarajevo, burning it to the ground. After this raid, large groups of Christian refugees from Bosnia settled in what was then an almost empty Slavonia. After the decisive Ottoman defeat in the Battle of Zenta in 1697 by the forces of Eugene of Savoy, the Peace of Karlowitz was signed in 1699, confirming the liberation of all of Slavonia from the Ottomans. For Croatia, nonetheless, large chunks of its late medieval territories between the rivers Una and Vrbas were lost, as they remained part of the Ottoman Bosnia Eyalet. In the following years, the use of the German language spread in the new military borderland and proliferated over the next two centuries as German-speaking colonists settled in the borderlands.

=== Enlightened despotism ===
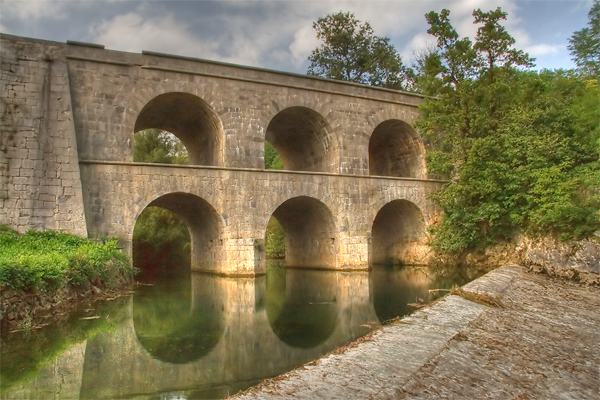
Tounj bridge on Jozephina road

By the 18th century, the Ottoman Empire had been driven out of Hungary, and Austria brought the empire under central control. Since the emperor Charles VI had no male heirs, he wanted to leave the imperial throne to his daughter Maria Theresa of Austria, which eventually led to the War of Austrian Succession of 1741–1748. The Croatian Parliament decided to accept Maria Theresa as a legitimate ruler by drafting the Pragmatic Sanction of 1712, asking in return that whoever inherited the throne recognize and respect Croatian autonomy from Hungary. The king unwillingly granted this. The rule of Maria Theresa brought limited modernization in education and health care. Croatian Royal Council (Consilium Regni Croatiae), which served as the de facto Croatian government, was founded in Varaždin in 1767, but it was abolished in 1779 and its authority was passed to Hungary. The foundation of the Croatian Royal Council in Varaždin made this town the administrative capital of Croatia, however, a large fire in 1776 caused significant damage to the city, so these major Croatian administrative institutions moved to Zagreb.

Maria Theresa's heir, Joseph II of Austria, also ruled in an enlightened absolutist manner, but his reforms were marked by attempts at centralization and Germanization. In this period, roads were built connecting Karlovac with Rijeka, and Jozefina connecting Karlovac with Senj. With the Treaty of Sistova, which ended the Austro-Turkish War (1788–1791), the Ottoman-held areas of Donji Lapac and Cetingrad, along with the villages of Drežnik Grad and Jasenovac, were ceded to the Habsburg monarchy and incorporated into the Croatian Military Frontier.

=== 19th century in Croatia ===
==== Napoleonic Wars ====
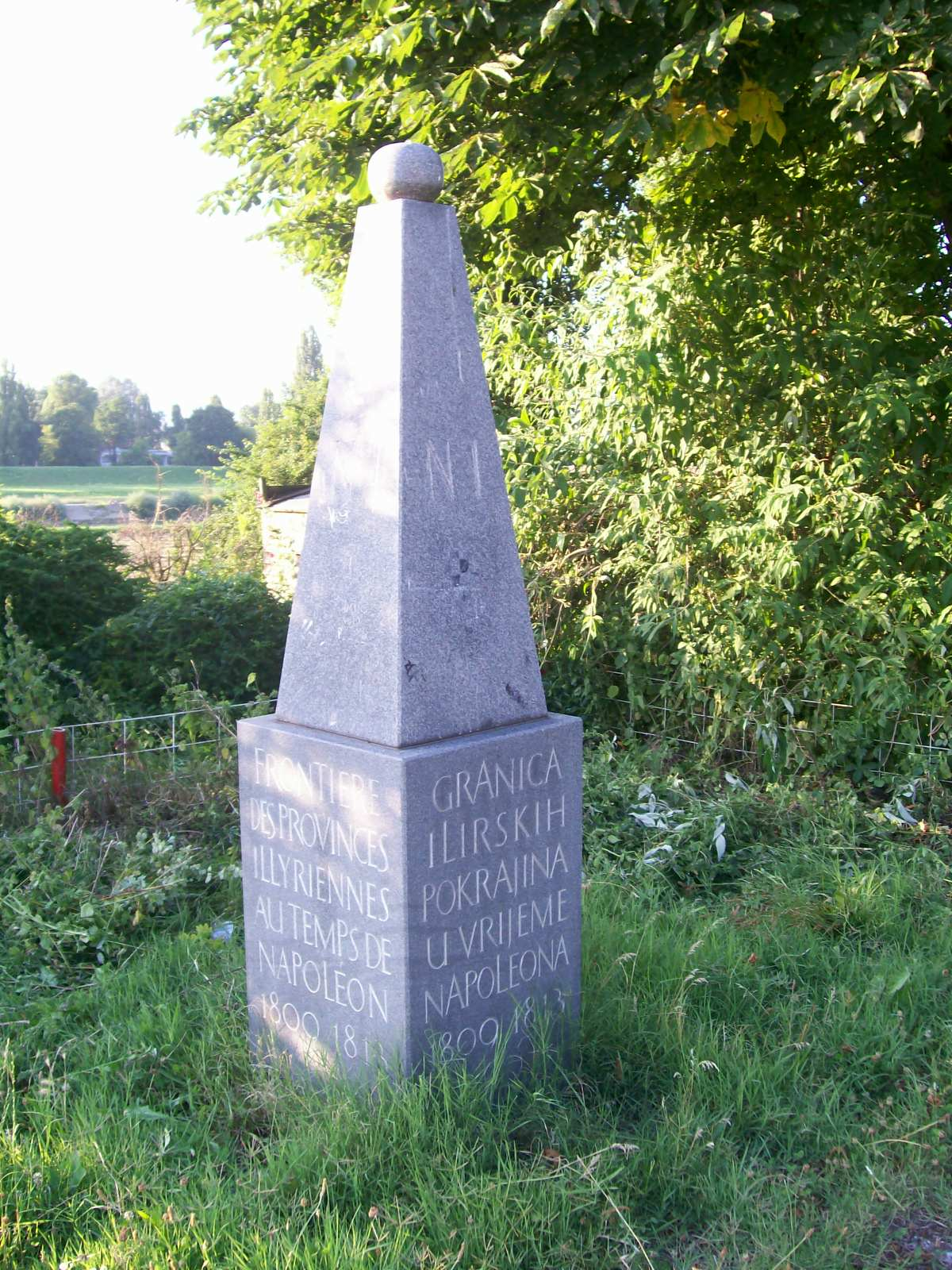
A border marking of Illyrian Provinces on Sava river shores in modern-day Zagreb.

As Napoleon's armies started to dominate Europe, Croatian lands came into contact with the French as well. When Napoleon abolished the Republic of Venice in 1797, former Venetian possessions in Dalmatia came under Habsburg rule. In 1809, as Napoleon defeated the Austrians in the Battle of Wagram, French-controlled territory eventually expanded to the Sava river. The French founded the "Illyrian Provinces" centered in Ljubljana and appointed Marshal Auguste de Marmont as their governor-general. The French presence brought the liberal ideas of the French Revolution to the Croats. The French founded Masonic lodges, built infrastructure, and printed the first newspapers in the local language in Dalmatia. Called Kraglski Datmatin/Il Regio Dalmata, it was printed in both Italian and Croatian. Croatian soldiers accompanied Napoleon in his conquests as far as Russia. In 1808, Napoleon abolished the Republic of Ragusa. Ottomans from Bosnia raided French Croatia and occupied the area of Cetingrad in 1809. Auguste de Marmont reacted by occupying Bihać on 5 May 1810. After the Ottomans promised to stop raiding French territories and withdraw from the Cetingrad, he withdrew from Bihać. With the fall of Napoleon, the French-controlled Croatian lands came back under Austrian rule.

==== Croatian national revival and the Illyrian Movement ====
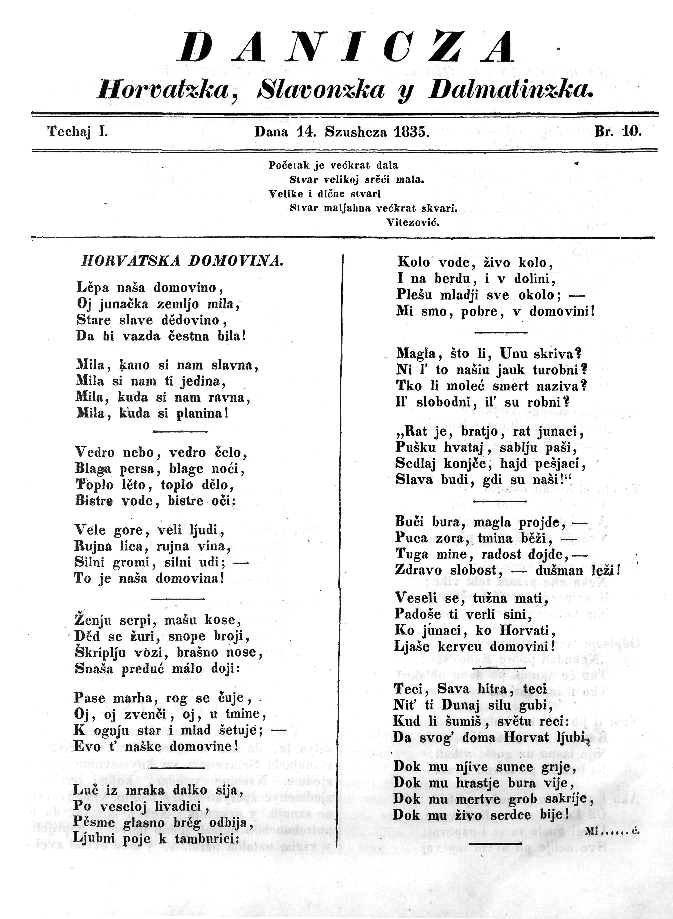
The 1835 issue of the magazine Danicza, with lyrics of what would later become the Croatian national anthem "Lijepa naša domovino" ("Our Beautiful Homeland").

Under the influence of German romanticism, French political thought, and pan-Slavism, Croatian romantic nationalism emerged in the mid-19th century to counteract the Germanization and Magyarization of Croatia. Ljudevit Gaj emerged as a leader of the Croatian national movement. One of the important issues to be resolved was the question of language, where regional Croatian dialects had to be standardized. Since the Shtokavian dialect, widespread among Croats, was also common with Serbs, this movement likewise had a South-Slavic characteristic. At the time, "Croatian" only referred to the population in southwestern parts of what is today Croatia, while "Illyrian" was used throughout the south-Slavic world; wider masses of people were attempted to attract by using the Illyrian name.

Illyrian activists chose the Shtokavian dialect over Kajkavian as the standardized version of Croatian language. The Illyrian movement was not accepted by the Serbs or the Slovenes, and it remained strictly a Croatian national movement. In 1832, Croatian count Janko Drašković wrote a manifesto of Croatian national revival called Disertacija (Dissertation). The manifesto called for the unification of Croatia with Slavonia, Dalmatia, Rijeka, the Military Frontier, Bosnia, and Slovene lands into a single unit inside the Hungarian part of the Austrian Empire. This unit would have Croatian as the official language and would be governed by Ban. The movement spread throughout Dalmatia, Istria and among Bosnian Francisian monks. It resulted in the emergence of the modern Croatian nation and eventually the formation of the first Croatian political parties. On Croatian Parliament of 1843, the two political parties appeared for the first time. The first party was pro-Illyrian People's Party, while the other one was pro-Hungarian Croatian-Hungarian Party. As the usage of Illyrian name became banned in 1843; the proponents of Illyrianism changed their name from Illyrian to Croatian.

On 2 May 1843, Ivan Kukuljević Sakcinski held the first speech on Croatian language in the Croatian Sabor, requesting that the Croatian language be made the official language in public institutions. At this point, this was a significant step, because Latin was still in use in public institutions in Croatia. In the Sabor in 1847 Croatian was proclaimed as an official language in Croatia. According to Croatian historian Nenad Moačanin, appearance of Romanticism also affected portion of Vlachs settled in Croatian depopulated areas who declared themselves as Serbs.

==== Croats in revolutions of 1848 ====
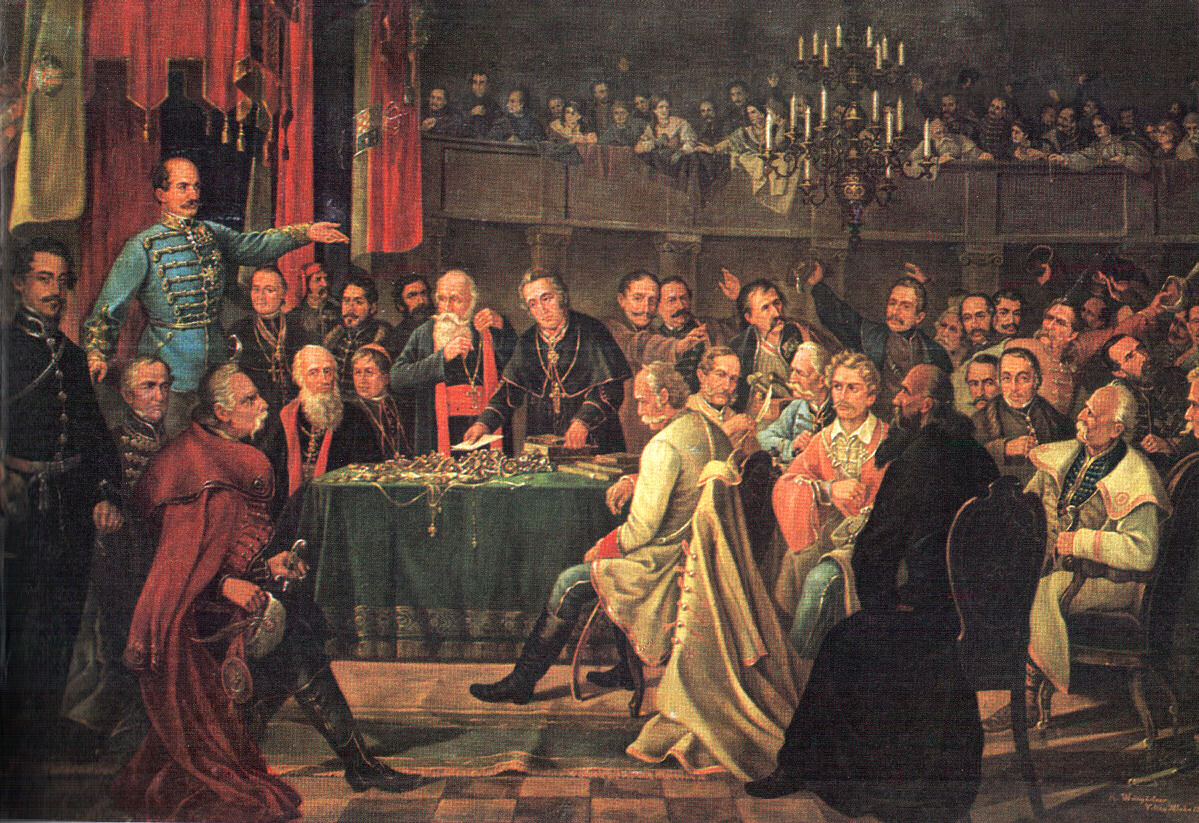
Ban Josip Jelačić at the opening of the first Croatian civic Parliament (Sabor) whose deputies were elected on 5 June 1848. In earlier Sabors, members represented feudal estates rather than citizens. The Croatian tricolor flag can also be seen in the background. Dragutin Weingärtner, 1885.

In the Revolutions of 1848, the Triune Kingdom of Croatia, Slavonia, and Dalmatia, driven by resistance to Magyar nationalism, sided with Habsburg royal court against Hungarian revolutionary forces. In March 1848 news of revolution in Paris and collapse of Metternich's regime in Vienna, mobilized People's Party supporters in Zagreb. During a session of the Croatian Sabor held on 25 March 1848 a petition called "Demands of The People" (Zahtjevanja naroda) was drafted to be handed over to the Austrian Emperor. The first of these demands was request for Military Frontier colonel Josip Jelačić to be appointed Ban of Croatia.

Other liberal demands asked for unification of Croatia and Slavonia with Dalmatia, a Croatian government responsible to the Croatian parliament - independent of Hungary, financial independence from Hungary, the introduction of the Croatian language in official use, freedom of the press, religious freedom, abolishment of serfdom, abolishment of nobility privileges, the foundation of a people's army, and equality before the law. King Ferdinand fearing pro-Hungarian ban of Croatia agreed and appointed Jelačić ban of Croatia.

As the Hungarian government denied the existence of the Croatian name and nationhood and treated Croatian institutions like provincial authorities, Jelačić severed ties between Croatia and Hungary. In May 1848, Ban's Council was formed which had all the executive powers of the Croatian government. The Croatian parliament also abolished feudalism, serfdom and demanded that the Monarchy become a constitutional federal state of equal nations with independent national governments and one federal parliament in the capital of Vienna. The Croatian parliament also demanded the unification of the Military Frontier and Dalmatia with Croatia proper. Sabor also asked for an undefined alliance with Istria, Slovene lands and parts of southern Hungary inhabited with Croats and Serbs.

Jelačić was also appointed the governor of Rijeka and Dalmatia as well as the "Imperial Commander of Military Frontier", thus practically having most of the Croatian lands under his command. The breakdown of negotiations between Croats and the Hungarians eventually led to war. Jelačić declared war to Hungary on 7 September 1848. On 11 September 1848, the Croatian army crossed the Drava river and annexed Međimurje. Upon crossing Drava, Jelačić ordered his army to switch Croatian national flags with Habsburg Imperial flags. Despite the contributions of its Ban Josip Jelačić in quenching the Hungarian war of independence, in the aftermath, Croatia was not treated any more favorably by Vienna than the Hungarians and therefore lost its domestic autonomy.

==== Croatia in Dual Monarchy ====
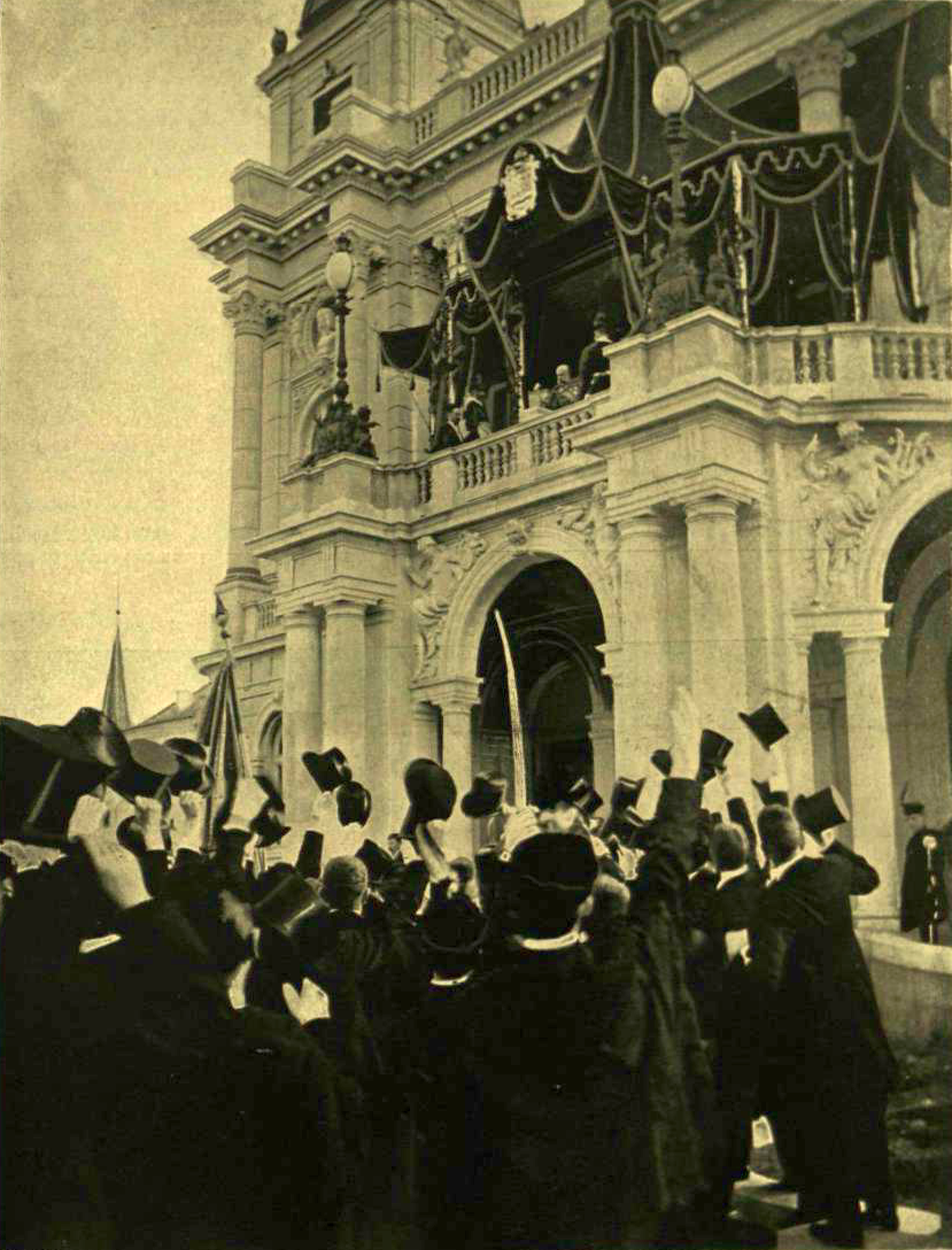
A visit of Austro-Hungarian emperor Franz Joseph to Zagreb in 1895, where he officially opened the Croatian National Theatre building.

The dual monarchy of Austria-Hungary was created in 1867 through the Austro-Hungarian Compromise. Croatian autonomy was restored in 1868 with the Croatian–Hungarian Settlement, which was comparatively favorable for the Croatians, but still problematic because of issues such as the unresolved status of Rijeka. In 1873, the territory of Military Frontier was demilitarized and in July 1871 a decision was made to incorporate it into Croatia with Croatian ban Ladislav Pejačević taking over the authority. Pejačević's successor Károly Khuen-Héderváry caused further problems by violating the Croatian-Hungarian Settlement through his hardline Magyarization policies in period from 1883 to 1903. Héderváry's Magyarization of Croatia led to massive riots in 1903, when Croatian protesters burnt Hungarian flags and clashed with the gendarmes and the military, resulting in the death of several protesters. As a consequence of these riots, Héderváry left his position as Ban of Croatia, but was appointed prime minister of Hungary.

A year earlier, in 1902, Srbobran, the newspaper of Zagreb Serbs, published an article titled "Do istrage naše ili vaše" (Until us, or you get exterminated). The article was filled with Greater Serbian ideology; its text denied the existence of the Croatian nation and the Croatian language and announced Serbian victory over "servile Croats", who would, the article proclaimed, be exterminated. The article sparked major anti-Serb riots in Zagreb, in which barricades were raised and Serb-owned properties were attacked. Serbs of Zagreb eventually distanced themselves from the opinions published in the article.

Two parts of the Triune Kingdom: Croatia-Slavonia (number 17) and Dalmatia (number 5) within Austria-Hungary

World War I brought an end to the Dual Monarchy. Croatia suffered a great loss of life in World War I. Late in the war, there were proposals to transform the dualist monarchy into a federalist one, with a separate Croatian/South Slavic section, however, these plans were never carried out, due to Woodrow Wilson's announcement of a policy of self-determination for peoples of Austria-Hungary.

Shortly before the end of the war in 1918, the Croatian Parliament severed relations with Austria-Hungary after receiving the news that the Czechoslovak parts had also separated from Austria-Hungary. The Triune Kingdom of Croatia, Slavonia, and Dalmatia became a part of the newly created provisional State of Slovenes, Croats and Serbs. This internationally unrecognized state was composed of all of the South Slavic territories of the old Austro-Hungarian Monarchy with a transitional government located in Zagreb. Its biggest issue, however, was the advancing Italian army that sought to capture the Croatian Adriatic territories promised to them by the Treaty of London in 1915. A solution was sought through unification with the Kingdom of Serbia, which had an army capable of confronting the Italians as well as the international legitimacy among the members of the Entente Cordiale, which was about to carve new European borders at the Paris Peace Conference.

== Croats inside the first Yugoslavia (1918–1941) ==
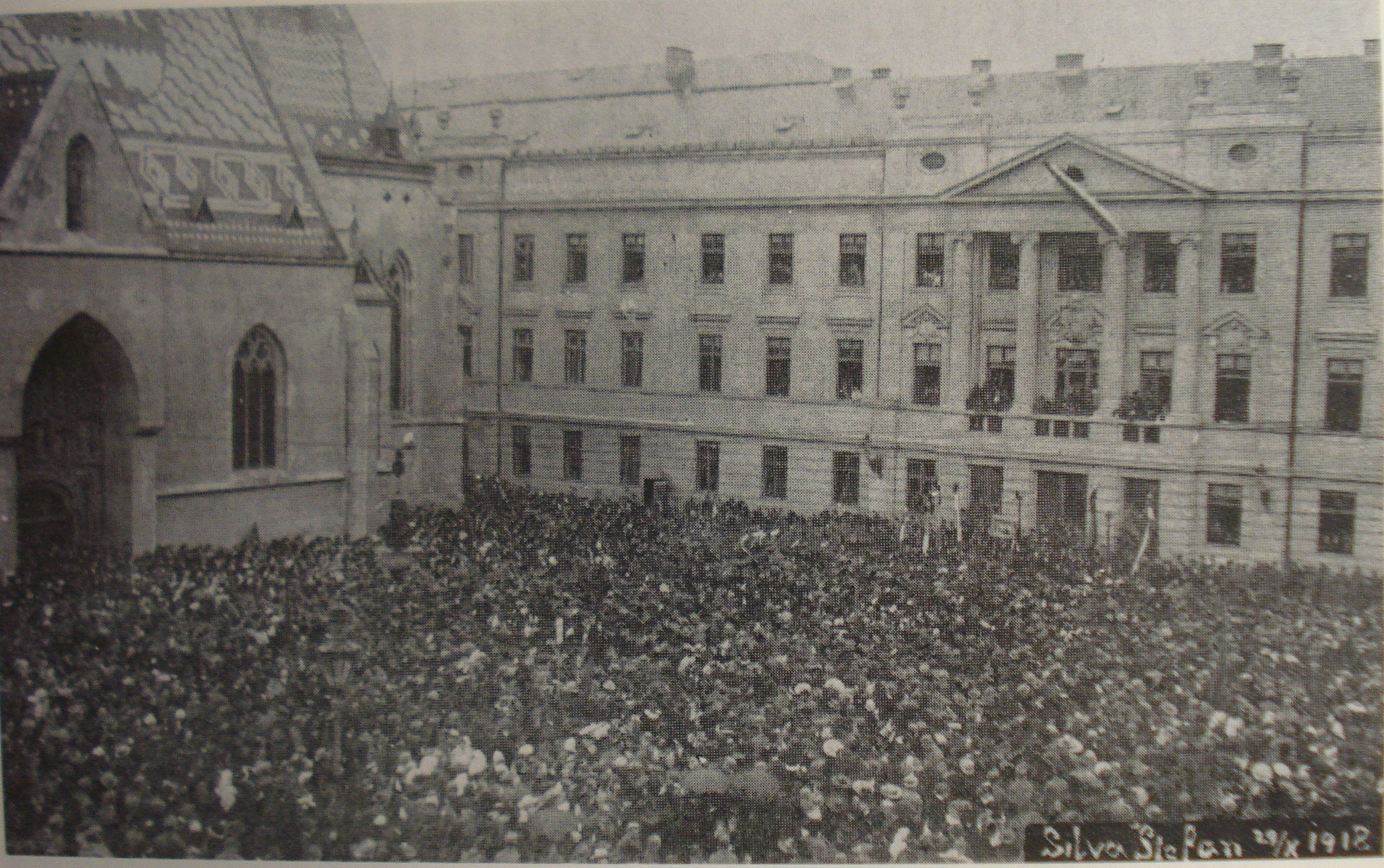
Proclamation of severing ties with Austria-Hungary in front of Croatian Sabor in 1918.

A new state was created in late 1918. Syrmia left Croatia-Slavonia and joined Serbia together with Vojvodina, shortly followed by a referendum to join Bosnia and Herzegovina to Serbia. The People's Council of Slovenes, Croats and Serbs (Narodno vijeće), guided by what was by that time a half-century-long tradition of pan-Slavism and without the sanction of the Croatian Sabor, merged with the Kingdom of Serbia into the Kingdom of the Serbs, Croats, and Slovenes. In the immediate aftermath of the war, the Allies of World War I occupied the eastern Adriatic within the framework of resolution of the Adriatic question. An attempt at resolution of the issue came in 1920 with the Treaty of Rapallo.

The Kingdom underwent a crucial change in 1921 to the dismay of Croatia's largest political party, the Croatian Peasant Party (Hrvatska seljačka stranka). The new constitution abolished historical/political entities, including Croatia and Slavonia, centralizing authority in the capital of Belgrade. The Croatian Peasant Party boycotted the government of the Serbian People's Radical Party throughout the period, except for a brief interlude between 1925 and 1927, when external Italian expansionism was at hand with her allies, Albania, Hungary, Romania, and Bulgaria, threatening Yugoslavia as a whole. Two differing concepts of how the new common state should be governed became the main source of conflict between Croatian elites led by the Croatian Peasant Party and Serbian elites. Leading Croatian politicians sought a federalized new state in which Croats would have certain autonomy (similar to what they had before in Austria-Hungary), while Serb-centered parties advocated unitarist policies, centralization, and assimilation. The new country's military was also a predominately Serbian institution; by 1938 only about 10% of all Army officers were Croats. The new school system was Serb-centered with Croatian teachers being either retired, purged, or transferred. Serbs were also posted as high state officials. The replacement of old Austro-Hungarian krones was conducted through an unfair rate of four Krones for one Serbian Dinar.

In the early 1920s, the Yugoslav government of Serbian prime minister Nikola Pašić used police pressure on voters and ethnic minorities, confiscation of opposition pamphlets, and election-rigging to keep the opposition, mainly the Croatian Peasant Party and its allies, in the minority in the Yugoslav parliament. Pašić believed that Yugoslavia should be as centralized as possible, creating a Greater Serbian national concept of concentrated power in the hands of Belgrade in place of distinct regional governments and identities.

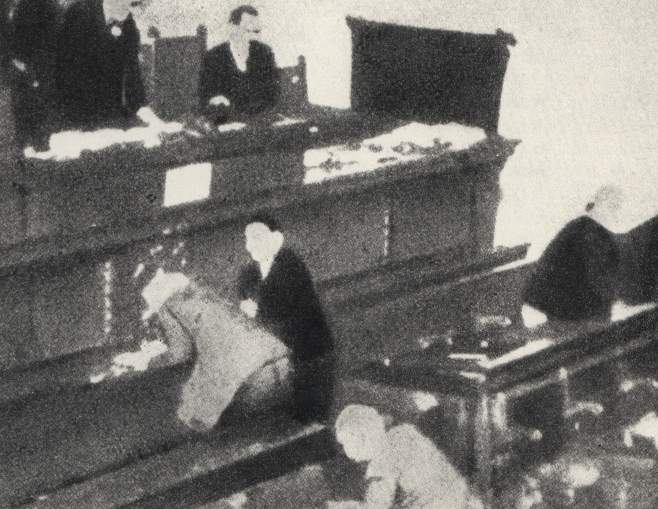
The assassination of Croatian MPs in the National Assembly in Belgrade was one of the events which greatly damaged relations between Serbs and Croats in the Kingdom of Serbs, Croats and Slovenes.

=== Murders of 1928 and royal dictatorship ===
During a Parliament session in 1928, Puniša Račić, a deputy of the Serbian Radical People's Party, shot at Croatian deputies, resulting in the killing of Pavle Radić and Đuro Basariček and the wounding of Ivan Pernar and Ivan Granđa. Stjepan Radić, a Croatian political champion at the time, was wounded and later succumbed to his wounds. These multiple murders caused the outrage of the Croatian population and ignited violent demonstrations, strikes, and armed conflicts throughout Croatian parts of the country. The Greater Serbian-influenced Royal Yugoslav Court even considered "amputation" of Croatian parts of the country, while leaving Yugoslavia only inside Greater Serbian borders, however, Croatian Peasant Party leadership rejected this idea. While Račić was subsequently tried for multiple murders, he served his sentence in a luxurious villa in Požarevac, where he had several servants at his disposal and was allowed to leave and return at any time.

In response to the shooting at the National Assembly, King Alexander abolished the parliamentary system and proclaimed a royal dictatorship. He imposed a new constitution aimed at removing all existing national identities and imposing "integral Yugoslavism". He also renamed the country from the Kingdom of Serbs, Croats and Slovenes to the Kingdom of Yugoslavia. The territory of Croatia was largely divided among the Sava Banovina and the Littoral Banovina. Political parties were banned and the royal dictatorship took on an increasingly harsh character. Vladko Maček, who had succeeded Radić as leader of the Croatian Peasant Party, the largest political party in Croatia, was imprisoned. Ante Pavelić was exiled from Yugoslavia and created the ultranationalist Ustaše Movement, with the ultimate goal of destroying Yugoslavia and making Croatia an independent country. According to the British historian Misha Glenny, the murder in March 1929 of Toni Schlegel, editor of the pro-Yugoslavian newspaper Novosti, brought a "furious response" from the regime. In Lika and west Herzegovina in particular, described as "hotbeds of Croatian separatism", Glenny wrote that the majority-Serb police acted "with no restraining authority whatsoever". In the words of a prominent Croatian writer, Schlegel's death became the pretext for terror in all forms. Politics was soon "indistinguishable from gangsterism". In 1931, the royal regime organized the assassination of Croatian scientist and intellectual Milan Šufflay on the streets of Zagreb. The assassination was condemned by globally renowned intellectuals such as Albert Einstein and Heinrich Mann. In 1932, the Ustaše Movement unsuccessfully planned the Velebit uprising in Lika. Despite the oppressive climate, few rallied to the Ustaša cause and the movement was never able to gain serious support among the Croatian population.

=== Banovina of Croatia ===
In 1934, King Aleksandar was assassinated during a state visit to Marseille by a coalition of the Ustaše and the Bulgarian Internal Macedonian Revolutionary Organization (IMRO), thus ending the Royal dictatorship. The government of Serbian Radical Milan Stojadinović, which took power in 1935, distanced Yugoslavia from its former allies of France and the United Kingdom and moved the country closer to Fascist Italy and Nazi Germany. In 1937 Yugoslav gendarmes led by Radical Party member Jovo Koprivica killed dozens of youth members of the Croatian Peasant Party in Senj because they sang Croatian patriotic songs. With the rise of Nazis in Germany and the looming possibility of another European war, Serbian political elites decided that it was time to fix relations with the Croats, the second largest ethnic group in the country, so that in the event of a new war the country would be united and without ethnic divisions. Negotiations started, resulting in the Cvetković–Maček Agreement and the creation of Banovina of Croatia, an autonomous Croatian province inside Yugoslavia. Banovina of Croatia was created in 1939 out of the two Banates, as well as parts of the Zeta, Vrbas, Drina, and Danube Banates. It had a reconstructed Croatian Parliament which would choose a Croatian Ban and Viceban. This Croatia included a part of Bosnia, most of Herzegovina, and Dubrovnik and its surroundings.

== World War II and the Independent State of Croatia (1941–1945) ==
Flag of the Independent State of Croatia

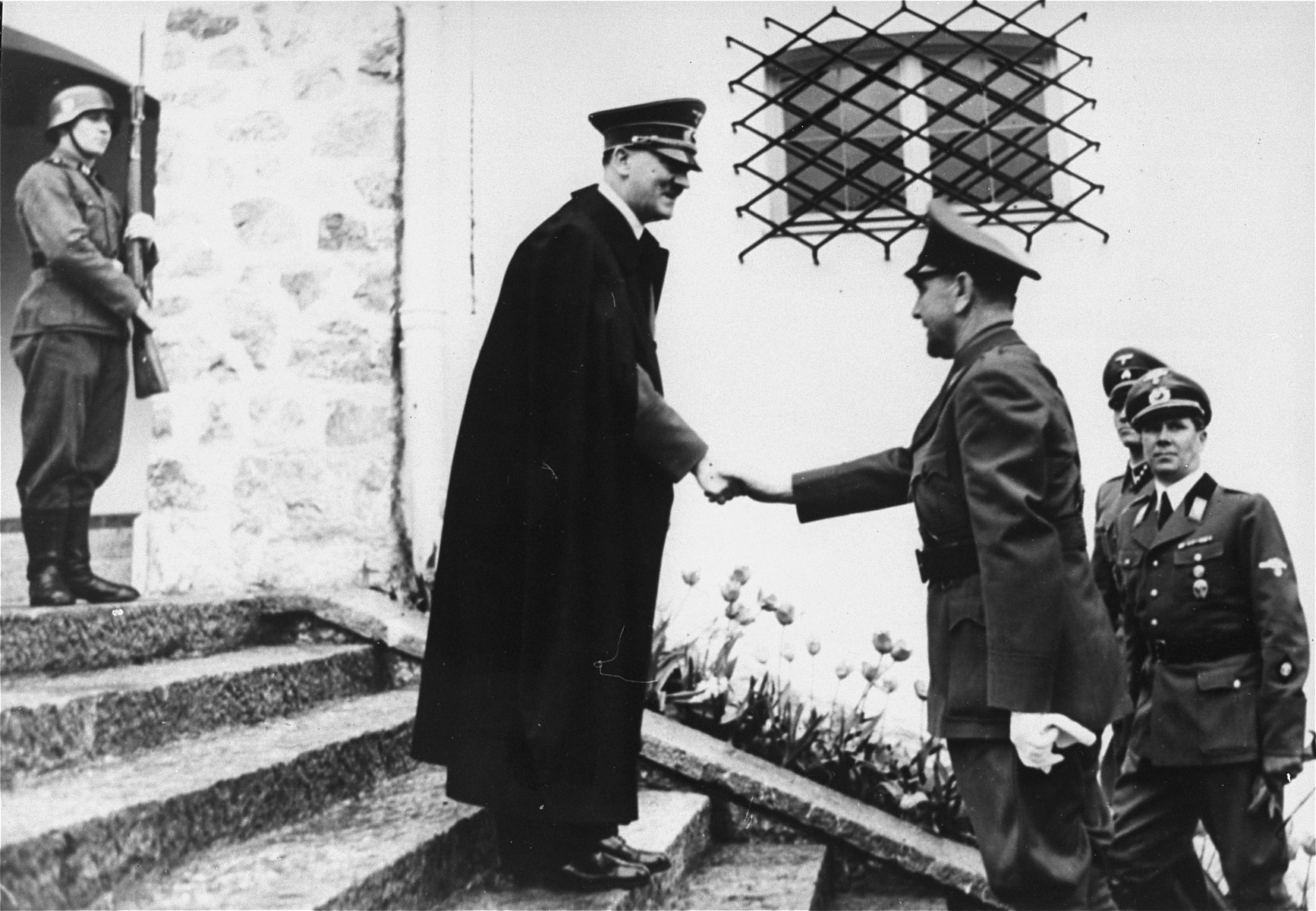
Poglavnik of the Independent State of Croatia, Ante Pavelić, shakes hands with Adolf Hitler in 1941.

The Axis occupation of Yugoslavia in 1941 allowed the Croatian radical right Ustaše to come into power, forming the "Independent State of Croatia" (Nezavisna Država Hrvatska, NDH), led by Ante Pavelić, who assumed the role of Poglavnik. Following the pattern of other fascist regimes in Europe, the Ustaše enacted racial laws and formed eight concentration camps targeting minority Serbs, Romas, and Jewish populations, as well as Croatian and Bosnian Muslim opponents of the regime. The biggest concentration camp was Jasenovac in Croatia. The NDH had a program, formulated by Mile Budak, to purge Croatia of Serbs, by "killing one third, expelling the other third and assimilating the remaining third". The main targets for persecution were the Serbs, of whom approximately 330,000 were killed.

Various Serbian nationalist Chetnik groups also committed atrocities against Croats across many areas of Lika and parts of northern Dalmatia. During World War II in Yugoslavia, the Chetniks killed an estimated 18,000-32,000 Croats.

The anti-fascist communist-led Partisan movement, based on a pan-Yugoslav ideology, emerged in early 1941 under the command of Croatian-born Josip Broz Tito, and spread quickly into many parts of Yugoslavia. The 1st Sisak Partisan Detachment, often hailed as the first armed anti-fascist resistance unit in occupied Europe, was formed in Croatia, in the Brezovica Forest near the town of Sisak. As the movement began to gain popularity, the Partisans gained strength from Croats, Bosniaks, Serbs, Slovenes, and Macedonians who believed in a unified, but federal, Yugoslav state.

By 1943, the Partisan resistance movement had gained the upper hand and in 1945, with help from the Soviet Red Army (passing only through small parts such as Vojvodina), expelled the Axis forces and local supporters. The State Anti-Fascist Council for the National Liberation of Croatia (ZAVNOH) functioned since 1942 and formed an interim civil government by 1943. NDH's ministers of War and Internal Security Mladen Lorković and Ante Vokić tried to switch to the Allied side. Pavelić was, in the beginning, supporting them but when he found that he would need to leave his position he imprisoned them in Lepoglava prison where they were executed.

Following the defeat of the Independent State of Croatia at the end of the war, a large number of Ustaše, civilians supporting them (ranging from sympathizers, young conscripts or anti-communists), Chetniks and anti-Communists attempted to flee in the direction of Austria, hoping to surrender to British forces and to be given refuge. Following the Bleiburg repatriations, they were instead interned by British forces, and returned to the Partisans where they were subject to mass executions.

== Socialist Yugoslavia (1945–1991) ==
=== Tito's leadership of the LCY (1945–1980) ===
Coat of arms of the Socialist Republic of Croatia

Croatia was one of six constituent socialist republics of the Socialist Federative Republic of Yugoslavia. Under the new communist system, privately owned factories and estates were nationalized, and the economy was based on a type of planned market socialism. The country underwent a rebuilding process, recovered from World War II, went through industrialization, and started developing tourism.

The country's socialist system also provided free apartments from large companies, which with the workers' self-management investments paid for the living spaces. From 1963, the citizens of Yugoslavia were allowed to travel to almost any country because of the neutral politics. No visas were required to travel to eastern or western countries or capitalist or communist nations. Such free travel was unheard of at the time in the Eastern Bloc countries, and in some western countries as well (e.g., Spain or Portugal, both dictatorships at the time). This proved to be helpful for Croatia's inhabitants who found working in foreign countries more financially rewarding. Upon retirement, a popular plan was to return to live in Croatia (then Yugoslavia) to buy more expensive property.

In Yugoslavia, the people of Croatia were guaranteed free healthcare, free dental care, and secure pensions. The older generation found this very comforting as pensions would sometimes exceed their former paychecks. Free trade and travel within the country also helped Croatian industries that imported and exported throughout all the former republics.

Students and military personnel were encouraged to visit other republics to learn more about the country, and all levels of education, including secondary education and higher education, were free. In reality, the housing was inferior with poor heat and plumbing, the medical care often lacking even in the availability of antibiotics, schools were propaganda machines and travel was a necessity to provide the country with hard currency. The government severely restricted free speech and did not protect citizens from ethnic attacks.

Croatia in the Socialist Federal Republic of Yugoslavia

Membership in the League of Communists of Yugoslavia was as much a prerequisite for admission to colleges and government jobs as in the Soviet Union under Joseph Stalin or Nikita Khrushchev. Private sector businesses did not grow as the taxes on private enterprise were often prohibitive. Inexperienced management sometimes ruled policy and controlled decisions by brute force. Strikes were forbidden, and owners/managers were not permitted to make changes or decisions which would impact their productivity or profit.

The economy developed into a type of socialism called samoupravljanje (self-management), in which workers controlled socially owned enterprises. This kind of market socialism created significantly better economic conditions than in the Eastern Bloc countries. Croatia went through intensive industrialization in the 1960s and 1970s with industrial output increasing several-fold and with Zagreb surpassing Belgrade in industry. Factories and other organizations were often named after Partisans who were declared national heroes. This practice also spread to street names, as well as the names of parks and buildings.

Before World War II, Croatia's industry was not developed, with the vast majority of the people employed in agriculture. By 1991, the country was completely transformed into a modern industrialized state. At the same time, the Croatian Adriatic coast had become a popular tourist destination, and the coastal republics (but mostly SR Croatia) profited greatly from this, as tourist numbers reached levels still unsurpassed in modern Croatia. The government brought unprecedented economic and industrial growth, high levels of social security, and a very low crime rate. The country completely recovered from WWII and achieved a very high GDP and economic growth rate, significantly higher than those of the present-day republic.

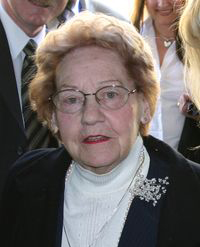
Savka Dabčević-Kučar, Croatian Spring participant; Europe's first female prime minister

The constitution of 1963 balanced power in the country between the Croats and the Serbs and alleviated the imbalance coming from the fact that the Croats were again in a minority position. Trends after 1965 (like the fall of OZNA and UDBA chief Aleksandar Ranković from power in 1966), however, led to the Croatian Spring of 1970–71, when students in Zagreb organized demonstrations to achieve greater civil liberties and greater Croatian autonomy. The regime stifled public protest and incarcerated the leaders, but this led to the ratification of a new constitution in 1974, giving more rights to the individual republics.

Radical Ustaše cells of Croatian émigrés based in Australia and Western Europe planned and attempted to carry out acts of sabotage within Yugoslavia, including an incursion from Austria of 19 armed men in June 1971, who unsuccessfully aimed to incite a popular Croatian uprising against what they called the "Serbo-communist" regime in Belgrade.

=== Until the breakup of Yugoslavia (1980–1991) ===
In 1980, after Tito's death, economic, political, and religious difficulties started to mount and the federal government began to crumble. The crisis in Kosovo and, in 1986, the emergence of Slobodan Milošević in Serbia provoked a very negative reaction in Croatia and Slovenia; politicians from both republics feared that his motives would threaten their republics' autonomy. With the climate of change throughout Eastern Europe during the 1980s, the communist hegemony was challenged (at the same time, the Milošević government began to gradually concentrate Yugoslav power in Serbia, and calls for free multi-party elections were becoming louder).

In June 1989, the Croatian Democratic Union (HDZ) was founded by Croatian nationalist dissidents led by Franjo Tuđman, a former fighter in Tito's Partisan movement and a JNA General. At this time, Yugoslavia was still a one-party state and open manifestations of Croatian nationalism were considered dangerous, so a new party was founded in an almost conspiratorial manner. It was only on 13 December 1989 that the governing League of Communists of Croatia agreed to legalize opposition political parties and hold free elections in the spring of 1990.

On 23 January 1990, at its 14th Congress, the Communist League of Yugoslavia voted to remove its monopoly on political power. The same day, it effectively ceased to exist as a national party when the League of Communists of Slovenia walked out after SR Serbia's President Slobodan Milošević blocked all their reformist proposals, which caused the League of Communists of Croatia to further distance themselves from the idea of a joint state.

== Republic of Croatia (1991–present) ==
=== Introduction of multi-party political system ===
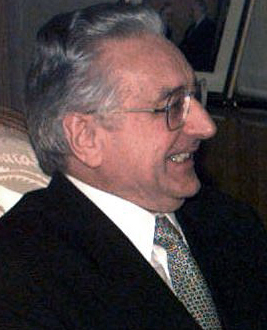
Franjo Tuđman, the 1st president of the modern independent Republic of Croatia

On 22 April and 7 May 1990, the first free multi-party elections were held in Croatia. Franjo Tuđman's Croatian Democratic Union (HDZ) won by a 42% margin against Ivica Račan's reformed communist Party of Democratic Change (SDP) who won 26%. Croatia's first-past-the-post election system enabled Tuđman to form the government relatively independently, as the win translated into 205 mandates (out of 351 total). The HDZ intended to secure independence for Croatia, contrary to the wishes of some ethnic Serbs in the republic and federal politicians in Belgrade. The excessively polarized climate soon escalated into complete estrangement between the two nations and spiraled into sectarian violence.

On 25 July 1990, a Serbian Assembly was established in Srb, north of Knin, as the political representation of the Serbian people in Croatia. The Serbian Assembly declared "sovereignty and autonomy of the Serb people in Croatia". Their position was that if Croatia could secede from Yugoslavia, then the Serbs could secede from Croatia. Milan Babić, a dentist from the southern town of Knin, was elected president. The rebel Croatian Serbs established some paramilitary militias under the leadership of Milan Martić, the police chief in Knin.

On 17 August 1990, the Serbs of Croatia began what became known as the Log Revolution, where barricades of logs were placed across roads throughout the South as an expression of their secession from Croatia. This effectively cut Croatia in two, separating the coastal region of Dalmatia from the rest of the country. The Croatian government responded to the road blockades by sending special police teams in helicopters to the scene, but they were intercepted by SFR Yugoslav Air Force fighter jets and forced to turn back to Zagreb.

The Croatian constitution was passed in December 1990, categorizing Serbs as a minority group along with other ethnic groups. On 21 December 1990, Babić's administration announced the creation of a Serbian Autonomous Oblast of Krajina (or SAO Krajina). Other Serb-dominated communities in eastern Croatia announced that they would also join SAO Krajina and ceased paying taxes to the Zagreb government.

On Easter Sunday, 31 March 1991, the first fatal clashes occurred when police from the Croatian Ministry of the Interior (MUP) entered the Plitvice Lakes National Park to expel rebel Serb forces. Serb paramilitaries ambushed a bus carrying Croatian police into the national park on the road north of Korenica, sparking a day-long gun battle between the two sides. During the fighting, one Croat and one Serb policeman were killed. Twenty other people were injured and twenty-nine Krajina Serb paramilitaries and policemen were taken prisoner by Croatian forces. Among the prisoners was Goran Hadžić, who would later become the President of the Republic of Serbian Krajina.

On 2 May 1991, the Croatian parliament voted to hold an independence referendum. On 19 May 1991, with a turnout of almost 80%, 93.24% voted for independence. Krajina boycotted the referendum. They had held their referendum a week earlier on 12 May 1991 in the territories they controlled and voted to remain in Yugoslavia. The Croatian government did not recognize their referendum as valid. On 25 June 1991, the Croatian Parliament declared independence from Yugoslavia. Slovenia declared independence from Yugoslavia on the same day.

=== War of Independence (1991–1995) ===
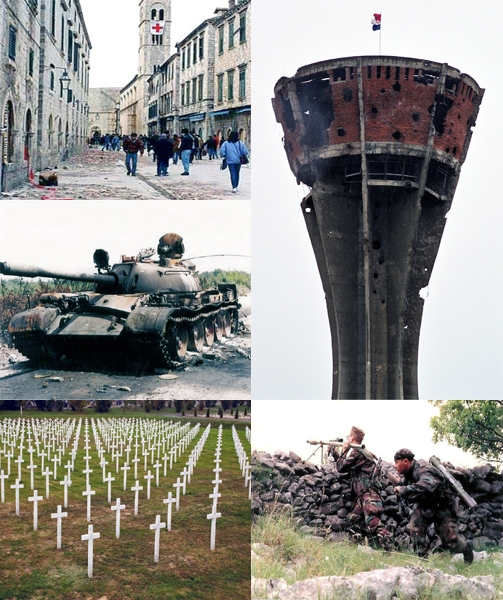
Clockwise from top left: The central street of Dubrovnik, the Stradun, in ruins during the Siege of Dubrovnik; the damaged Vukovar water tower, a symbol of the early conflict, flying the Croatian tricolor; soldiers of the Croatian Army getting ready to destroy a Serbian tank; the Vukovar Memorial Cemetery; a Serbian T-55 tank destroyed on the road to Drniš

During the Croatian War of Independence, the civilian population fled the areas of armed conflict en masse, with hundreds of thousands of Croats moving away from the Bosnian and Serbian border areas. In many places, masses of civilians were forced out by the Yugoslav National Army (JNA), which consisted mostly of conscripts from Serbia and Montenegro, and irregulars from Serbia, participating in what became known as ethnic cleansing.

The border city of Vukovar underwent a three-month siege during the Battle of Vukovar. It left most of the city destroyed and a majority of the population was forced to flee. The city was taken over by the Serbian forces on 18 November 1991 and the Vukovar massacre occurred. Subsequent United Nations-sponsored cease fires followed, and the warring parties were mostly entrenched. The Yugoslav People's Army retreated from Croatia into Bosnia and Herzegovina where a new cycle of tensions was escalating—the Bosnian War was about to start. During 1992 and 1993, Croatia also handled an estimated 700,000 refugees from Bosnia, mainly Bosnian Muslims.

Armed conflict in Croatia remained intermittent and mostly small-scale until 1995. In early August, Croatia embarked on Operation Storm, an attack that quickly reconquered most of the territories from the Republic of Serbian Krajina authorities, leading to a mass exodus of the Serbian population. Estimates of the number of Serbs who fled before, during and after the operation range from 90,000 to 200,000.

As a result of this operation, a few months later the Bosnian War ended with the negotiation of the Dayton Agreement. A peaceful integration of the remaining Serbian-controlled territories in eastern Slavonia was completed in 1998 under UN supervision. The majority of the Serbs who fled from former Krajina did not return due to fears of ethnic violence, discrimination, and property repossession problems; and the Croatian government has yet to achieve the conditions for full reintegration. According to the United Nations High Commissioner for Refugees, around 125,000 ethnic Serbs who fled the 1991–1995 conflict are registered as having returned to Croatia, of whom around 55,000 remain permanently.

=== Transition period ===
Croatia became a member of the Council of Europe in 1996. Between 1995 and 1997 Franjo Tuđman became increasingly more authoritiarian and refused to formally acknowledge local election results in City of Zagreb, leading to the Zagreb crisis. In 1996 his government attempted to shut down Radio 101, a popular radio station which was critical towards HDZ and often made fun of HDZ and Tuđman himself. When Radio 101's broadcasting rights were revoked in 1996, some 120,000 Croatian citizens protested in Ban Jelačić Square against the decision. Tuđman gave the order to suppress the protest with a riot police, but then-minister of the internal affairs Ivan Jarnjak disobeyed his order for which he was subsequently dismissed from his position. While the years 1996 and 1997 were a period of post-war recovery and improving economic conditions, in 1998 and 1999 Croatia experienced an economic depression resulting in the unemployment of thousands.

The remainder of former self-proclaimed Krajina, adjacent to the FR Yugoslavia, negotiated a peaceful reintegration process with the Croatian government. The so-called Erdut Agreement made the area a temporary protectorate of the UN Transitional Administration for Eastern Slavonia, Baranja and Western Sirmium. The area was formally re-integrated into Croatia by 1998. Franjo Tuđman's government started to lose popularity as it was criticized for its involvement in suspicious privatization deals in the early 1990s, as well as for international isolation. The country experienced a mild recession in 1998 and 1999.

Tuđman died in 1999 and in the early 2000 parliamentary elections, the nationalist Croatian Democratic Union (HDZ) government was replaced by a center-left coalition under the Social Democratic Party of Croatia, with Ivica Račan as prime minister. At the same time, presidential elections were held which were won by a moderate, Stjepan Mesić. The new Račan government amended the constitution, changing the political system from a presidential system to a parliamentary system, transferring most executive presidential powers from the president to the institutions of the parliament and the prime minister.

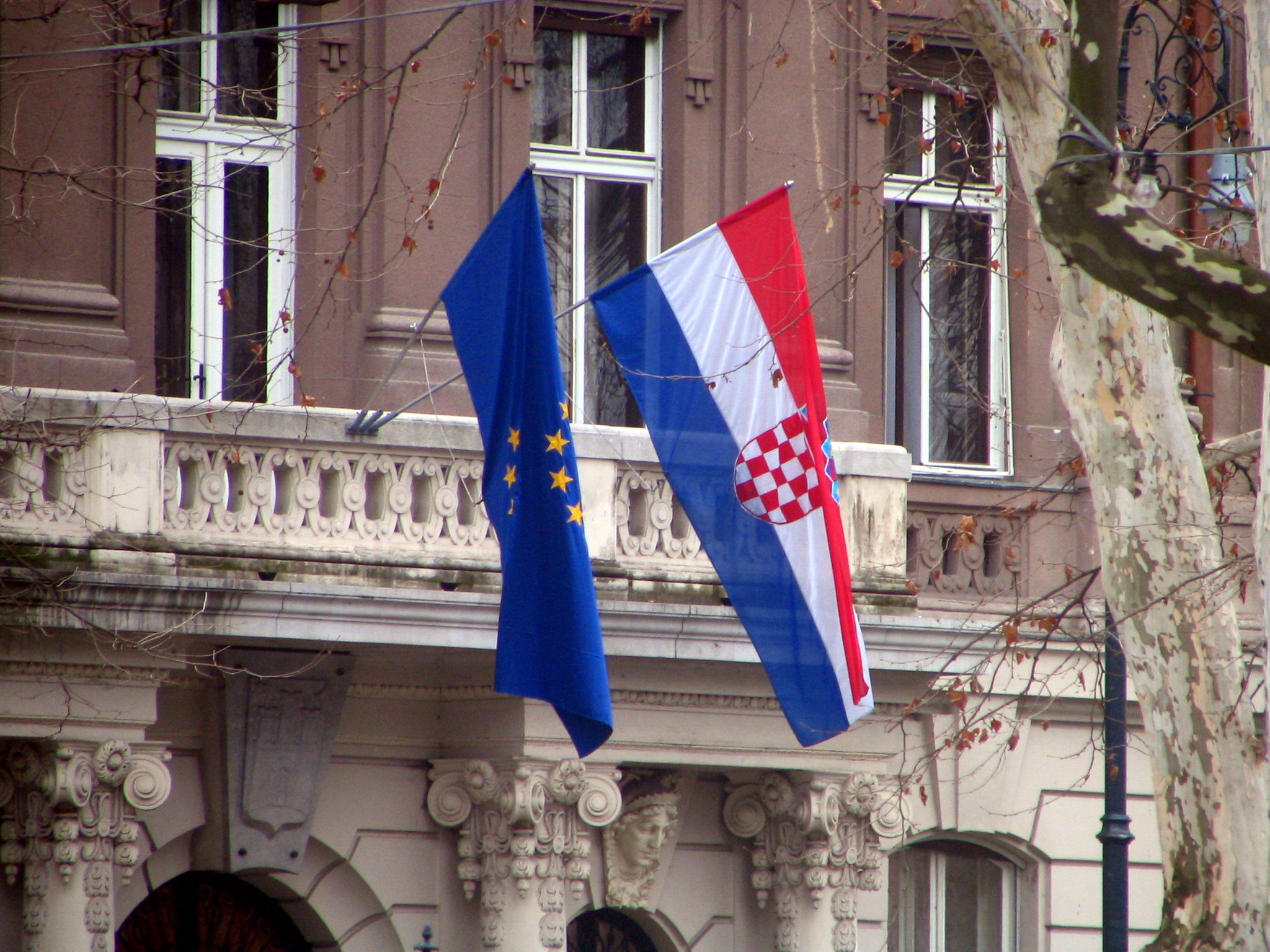
The flag of Croatia was hoisted together with the flag of Europe on the building of the Ministry of Foreign and European Affairs in Zagreb as a symbol of Croatia's membership in both the Council of Europe and the European Union

The new government also started several large building projects, including state-sponsored housing, more rebuilding efforts to enable refugee return, and the building of the A1 highway connenting Zagreb and Split - two of Croatia's largest cities. The country achieved notable economic growth during these years, while the unemployment rate continued to rise until 2001 when it finally started falling. Croatia became a World Trade Organization (WTO) member in 2000 and started the Accession of Croatia to the European Union in 2003.

In late 2003, new parliamentary elections were held and a reformed HDZ party won under the leadership of Ivo Sanader, who became prime minister. European accession was delayed by controversies over the extradition of army generals to the International Criminal Tribunal for the former Yugoslavia (ICTY), including the runaway Ante Gotovina. Sanader was reelected in the closely contested 2007 parliamentary election. Other complications continued to stall the EU negotiating process, most notably Slovenia's blockade of Croatia's EU accession in 2008–2009. In June 2009, Sanader abruptly resigned from his post and named Jadranka Kosor in his place. Kosor introduced austerity measures to counter the economic crisis and launched an anti-corruption campaign aimed at public officials. In late 2009, Kosor signed an agreement with Borut Pahor, the premier of Slovenia, that allowed the EU accession to proceed.

In the Croatian presidential election, 2009–2010, Ivo Josipović, the candidate of the SDP won a landslide victory. Sanader tried to come back into HDZ in 2010 but was then ejected, and USKOK soon had him arrested on several corruption charges. In November 2012, a court in Croatia sentenced former Prime Minister Ivo Sanader, in office from 2003 to 2009, to 10 years in prison for taking bribes. Sanader tried to argue that the case against him was politically motivated. In 2011, the accession agreement was concluded, giving Croatia the all-clear to join. The 2011 Croatian parliamentary election was held on 4 December 2011, and the Kukuriku coalition won. After the election, the center-left government was formed led by new prime minister Zoran Milanović.

=== European Union and NATO Membership (2013–present) ===
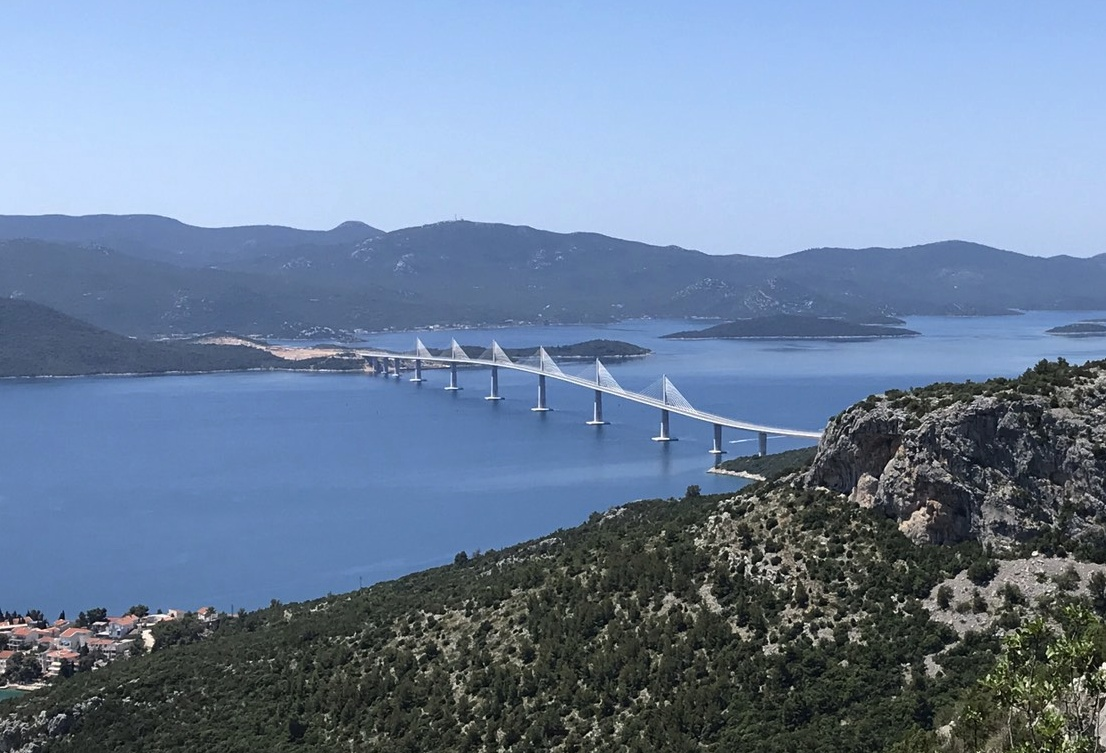
Pelješac Bridge in June 2022.

Following the ratification of the Treaty of Accession 2011 and the successful 2012 Croatian European Union membership referendum, Croatia joined the EU on 1 July 2013. The accession of Croatia to NATO took place in 2009. The country entered into Partnership for Peace in 2000, which began the process of accession into the alliance. It received an invitation to join at the 2008 Bucharest summit and became a full member on 1 April 2009. Following the 2012 ascension of Tomislav Karamarko to the leadership of the Croatian Democratic Union (HDZ), the main opposition party underwent a significant rightward ideological shift. Under this new direction, war veteran organizations were increasingly mobilized by HDZ against the center-left government. This political strategy culminated between October 2014 and May 2016 in a major, months-long protest by war veterans in Zagreb targeting social-democratic Minister of Veterans' Affairs Predrag Matić. The demonstrations, which included direct clashes with police on St. Mark's Square, successfully shifted the country's political climate and paved the way for the right-wing coalition governments that followed the 2014–15 presidential elections and 2015 parliamentary elections. In the 2014–15 Croatian presidential election, Kolinda Grabar-Kitarović became the first Croatian female President. The 2015 Croatian parliamentary election resulted in the victory of the Patriotic Coalition which formed a new government with the Bridge of Independent Lists. However, a vote of no confidence brought down the Cabinet of Tihomir Orešković. After the 2016 Croatian parliamentary election, the Cabinet of Andrej Plenković was formed.

In January 2020, the former prime minister Zoran Milanović of the Social Democrats (SDP) won the presidential election. He defeated center-right incumbent Kolinda Grabar-Kitarović of the ruling Croatian Democratic Union (HDZ). In March 2020, the Croatian capital Zagreb experienced a 5.3 magnitude earthquake which caused significant damage to the city. In July 2020, the ruling center-right party HDZ won the parliamentary election. On 12 October 2020 right-wing extremist Danijel Bezuk attempted an attack on the building of the Croatian government, wounded a police officer in the process, and then killed himself. In December 2020. Banovina, one of the less developed regions of Croatia was shaken by a 6.4 M earthquake which killed several people and destroyed the town of Petrinja. Throughout two and half years of the global COVID-19 pandemic, 16,103 Croatian citizens died from the disease. In March 2022, a Soviet-made Tu-141 drone crashed in Zagreb, most likely due to the 2022 Russian invasion of Ukraine. On 26 July 2022, Croatian authorities opened Pelješac Bridge, thus connecting the southernmost part of Croatia with the rest of the country. On 1 January 2023 Croatia became a member of both the Eurozone and Schengen Area. Following the 2024 parliamentary elections, the governing coalition between the conservative HDZ and the right-wing populist Homeland Movement marked a shift in the country's political landscape. This period saw heightened polarization and criticism regarding the normalization of controversial historical symbols and revisionism in the public sphere, as highlighted by international civil rights monitoring. These tensions culminated in late 2025 and 2026 through a series of widespread anti-fascist marches and subsequent legal and public debates over the freedom of assembly and speech.

== See also ==
- Bans of Croatia
- Croatian art
- Croatian History Museum
- Croatian Military Frontier
- Croatian nobility
- Culture of Croatia
- History of Dalmatia
- History of Hungary
- History of Istria
- Hundred Years' Croatian–Ottoman War
- Kingdom of Dalmatia
- Kingdom of Slavonia
- Kings of Croatia
- List of noble families of Croatia
- List of rulers of Croatia
- Military history of Croatia
- Timeline of Croatian history
- Turkish Croatia
- Twelve noble tribes of Croatia

== Bibliography ==
- Roy Adkins; Lesley Adkins (2008). The War for All the Oceans. Penguin Books. ISBN 978-0-14-311392-8.
- Damir Agičić; Dragutin Feletar; AnitaFilipčić; Tomislav Jelić; Zoran Stiperski (2000). Povijest i zemljopis Hrvatske: priručnik za hrvatske manjinske škole [History and Geography of Croatia: Minority School Manual] (in Croatian). Nakladna kuća "Dr. Feletar". ISBN 978-953-6235-40-7.
- Ivo Banac (1984). The national question in Yugoslavia: origins, history, politics. Cornell University Press. ISBN 978-0-8014-9493-2.
- Mark Biondich (2000). Stjepan Radić, the Croat Peasant Party, and the politics of mass mobilization, 1904–1928. University of Toronto Press. ISBN 978-0-8020-8294-7.
- Peterjon Cresswell (10 July 2006). Time Out Croatia (First ed.). London, Berkeley & Toronto: Time Out Group Ltd & Ebury Publishing, Random House. ISBN 978-1-904978-70-1.
- Sharon Fisher (2006). Political change in post-Communist Slovakia and Croatia: from nationalist to Europeanist. Palgrave Macmillan. ISBN 978-1-4039-7286-6.
- Joerg Forbrig; Pavol Demeš (2007). Reclaiming democracy: civil society and electoral change in central and eastern Europe. The German Marshall Fund of the United States. ISBN 978-80-969639-0-4.
- Richard C. Frucht (2005). Eastern Europe: An Introduction to the People, Lands, and Culture. ABC-CLIO. ISBN 978-1-57607-800-6.
- Mirjana Kasapović, ed. (2001). HRVATSKA POLITIKA 1990.-2000 [Croatian Politics 1990–2000] (in Croatian). University of Zagreb, Faculty of Political Science. ISBN 978-953-6457-08-3.
- Kaser, Karl (1997). Slobodan seljak i vojnik: rana krajiška društva, 1545–1754 [Free Peasant and Soldier: Early Krajina Societies, 1545–1754] (in Croatian). Zagreb: Naprijed.
- Matjaž Klemenčič; Mitja Žagar (2004). The former Yugoslavia's diverse peoples: a reference sourcebook. ABC-CLIO. ISBN 978-1-57607-294-3.
- Frederic Chapin Lane (1973). Venice, a Maritime Republic. JHU Press. ISBN 978-0-8018-1460-0.
- Branka Magaš (2007). Croatia through history: the making of a European state. Saqi Books. ISBN 978-0-86356-775-9.
- Ivan Mužić (2007). Hrvatska povijest devetoga stoljeća [Croatian Ninth Century History] (PDF) (in Croatian). Naklada Bošković. ISBN 978-953-263-034-3. Archived from the original (PDF) on 8 August 2019.
- Patterson, Patrick Hyder. "The futile crescent? Judging the legacies of Ottoman rule in Croatian history". Austrian History Yearbook, vol. 40, 2009, p. 125+. online.
- Tapon, Francis (2012). The Hidden Europe: What Eastern Europeans Can Teach Us. WanderLearn Press. ISBN 9780976581222.
