= Karl Kaser (historian) =

Austrian academic

- Born: 1954
- Died: April 11, 2022 (aged 67–68)
- Education: University of Graz

Karl Kaser (1954 – 11 April 2022) was an Austrian historian who specialized in Southeastern Europe.

== Education and career ==
Kaser was born in Pischelsdorf in der Steiermark, Austria in 1954. He studied at the University of Graz, majoring in History and minoring in Slavic Languages and Literature in 1974. He received a PhD from Graz in Southeast European History in 1980. That same year, he began his career as a researcher and Professor of Southeastern Europe at the university. In 1988, he was appointed Adjunct Assistant Professor and in 1996 as full Professor for Southeast European History and Anthropology.

Kaser's main area of interest was on the history of family and gender relations as well visual cultures in the Balkans.

Kaser died on 11 April 2022 in Piran, Slovenia.

== Selected bibliography ==
- Kaser, Karl (1992). Hirten, Kämpfer, Stammeshelden: Ursprünge und Gegenwart des balkanischen Patriarchats [Shepherds, Fighters, Tribal Heroes: Origins and Present of the Balkan Patriarchate]. Böhlau Verlag Wien. ISBN 9783205055457.
- Kaser, Karl; Katschnig-Fasch, Elisabeth (2005). Gender and Nation in South Eastern Europe. LIT Verlag Münster. ISBN 9783825888022.
- Kaser, Karl, ed. (2005). Anthropological yearbook of European cultures. LIT-Verlag. ISBN 9783825888022.
- Kaser, Karl (2008). Patriarchy After Patriarchy: Gender Relations in Turkey and in the Balkans, 1500-2000. LIT Verlag Münster. ISBN 9783825811198.
- Kaser, Karl (2011). The Balkans and the Near East: Introduction to a Shared History. LIT Verlag Münster. ISBN 9783643501905.
- Kaser, Karl, ed. (2012). Household and Family in the Balkans: Two Decades of Historical Family Research at University of Graz. LIT Verlag Münster. ISBN 9783643504067.
- Gutmeyr, Dominik; Kaser, Karl, eds. (2018). Europe and the Black Sea Region: A History of Early Knowledge Exchange (1750-1850). LIT Verlag Münster. ISBN 9783643802866.
- Kaser, Karl (2021). Femininities and Masculinities in the Digital Age: Realia and Utopia in the Balkans and South Caucasus. Springer Nature. ISBN 9783030784126.
