= Trpimirović royal family tree =

Family tree of the Trpimirović Dynasty, a Croatian royal family, from 845 to 1091.

== Chronology and genealogy ==
As stated in the Croatian Encyclopedia, "due to the lack of sources, some genealogical questions related to the dynasty cannot be definitively resolved, nor can the exact years of the reign be determined for most of the rulers". The common chronology of the dukes and kings of Croatia was conceptualized by Franjo Rački and Ferdo Šišić, but although generally accepted, has several controversial claims about the 9th and 10th century line of the Trpimirović dynasty. In their interpretation of the De Administrando Imperio (which is mentioning in chronological order prince Terpimer father of Krasimer, prince Krasimer father of Miroslav who was killed by ban Pribina) the rulers, including Trpimir known from other sources as ruling cca. 845–864, have actually ruled in the first part of the 10th century and invented Trpimir II whose not mentioned in historical sources. Due to such discrepancies and historiographical inventions, there were proposed revised chronologies and family tree.

== Family tree ==
Trpimir I Duke of Croatia (845–864)
Petar	Zdeslav; Duke of Croatia (878–879)	Muncimir; Duke of Croatia (892–910)
Tomislav; Duke of Croatia (910–925), King of Croatia (925 – March 11th, 928)	Trpimir II; King of Croatia (928–935)
Krešimir I King of Croatia (935–945)	Domaslava
Miroslav; King of Croatia (945–949)	Michael Krešimir II "The Great"; King of Croatia (949–969)	Jelena of Zadar; Regent (969 -975)
Stephen Držislav; King of Croatia (969–997)
Svetoslav Suronja; King of Croatia (997–1000)	Krešimir III; King of Croatia (1000–1030)	Gojslav ( co- ) King of Croatia (1000–1020)
Stjepan Svetoslavić; Ban of Slavonia (northern Croatia)	Stephen I King of Croatia (1030–1058)	Joscella (Hicela) Orseolo of Venice
Peter Krešimir IV; King of Croatia (1058–1074)	Častimir
Demetrius Zvonimir; King of Croatia (1075 – April 20th,1089)	Jelena Lijepa of Hungary (married 1063, died 1091)	Neda (or Nada)	Stephen II; King of Croatia (1089–1091) last male Trpimirović
Radovan died at an early age (before 1089)	Klaudija	Vonick, Voivode of Lapčani
