= Ban of Croatia =

Historical title of rulers and viceroys in Croatian history

- Hrvatski ban
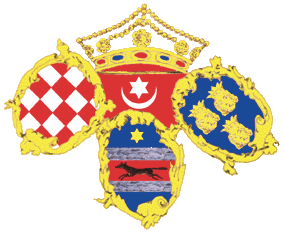
- The heraldic standard of the Croatian ban in the 19th century
- Reports to: King of Croatia; Croatian Parliament
- Seat: Banski dvori, Zagreb, Croatia
- Term length: No fixed term length
- Formation: c. 949
- First holder: Pribina
- Final holder: Ivan Šubašić
- Abolished: 10 April 1941 (de facto); 13 June 1943 (de jure)

Ban of Croatia (Croatian: Hrvatski ban) was the title of local rulers or office holders and after 1102, viceroys of Croatia. From the earliest periods of the Croatian state, some provinces were ruled by bans as a ruler's representative (viceroy) and supreme military commander. In the 18th century, Croatian bans eventually became the chief government officials in Croatia.

They were at the head of the Ban's Government, effectively the first prime ministers of Croatia. The institution of ban persisted until the first half of the 20th century, when it was officially superseded in function by that of a parliamentary prime minister.

== Origin of title ==
South Slavic ban (Croatian pronunciation: [bâːn], with a long [a]), is directly attested in 10th-century Constantine Porphyrogenitus' book De Administrando Imperio as βο(ε)άνος, in a chapter dedicated to Croats and the organization of their state, describing how their ban "has under his rule Krbava, Lika and Gacka."

== Bans during the Trpimirović dynasty ==
References from the earliest periods are scarce, but history recalls that the first known Croatian ban is Pribina from the 10th century. In the early Middle Ages, the ban was the royal district governor of Lika, Gacka and Krbava. Later, the meaning of the title was elevated to that of provincial governor in the Kingdom of Croatia. King Demetrius Zvonimir was originally a ban serving under King Peter Krešimir IV.

Name (Birth–Death)	Term start	Term end	Notes	Monarch (Reign)
Pribina	c. 949	c. 969	The first historically attested Ban of Croatia. Pribina deposed of King Miroslav during a civil war in the Croatian Kingdom, and replaced him with Michael Krešimir. He ruled over the Gacka, Krbava and Lika counties, according to De Administrando Imperio. He is also possibly referred to in a charter as potens banus, meaning "powerful ban".	Miroslav (945–949)
Pribina	c. 949	c. 969	The first historically attested Ban of Croatia. Pribina deposed of King Miroslav during a civil war in the Croatian Kingdom, and replaced him with Michael Krešimir. He ruled over the Gacka, Krbava and Lika counties, according to De Administrando Imperio. He is also possibly referred to in a charter as potens banus, meaning "powerful ban".	Michael Krešimir II (949–969)
Godemir	c. 969	c. 997	Also called Godimir. He is mentioned to have served kings Michael Krešimir and Stephen Držislav in a charter of King Peter Krešimir IV from 1068.	Michael Krešimir II (949–969)
Godemir	c. 969	c. 997	Also called Godimir. He is mentioned to have served kings Michael Krešimir and Stephen Držislav in a charter of King Peter Krešimir IV from 1068.	Stephen Držislav (969–997)
Gvarda	c. 997	c. 1000	Mentioned in a charter of King Peter Krešimir IV from 1068.	Stephen Držislav (969–997)
Gvarda	c. 997	c. 1000	Mentioned in a charter of King Peter Krešimir IV from 1068.	Svetoslav Suronja (997–1000)
Božeteh	c. 1000	c. 1030	Mentioned in a charter of King Peter Krešimir IV from 1068.	Svetoslav Suronja (997–1000)
Božeteh	c. 1000	c. 1030	Mentioned in a charter of King Peter Krešimir IV from 1068.	Krešimir III (1000–1030); Gojslav (1000–1020)
Stephen Praska	c. 1035	c. 1058	According to the chronicle of Archdeacon Goricensis John, he was named as ban by King Stephen I around 1035 (after his military expeditions to the east), thus succeeding Božeteh as Croatian ban. He eventually attained a Byzantine imperial title of protospatharios somewhere between 1035 and 1042, which governed his influence over the Dalmatian theme.	Stephen I (1030–1058)
Gojčo	c. 1059	c. 1069	He was possibly the brother of King Peter Krešimir IV, who was rumored to have murdered his other brother called Gojslav.	Peter Krešimir IV (1058–1074)
Demetrius Zvonimir	c. 1064/1070	c. 1075	Croatian charters at the time were issued in the names of both King Peter Krešimir and Ban Zvonimir. In 1074, Normans from southern Italy invaded Croatia and captured a certain Croatian ruler whose name is not known, certainly King Peter Krešimir, who died soon after and was succeeded by Demetrius Zvonimir.	Peter Krešimir IV (1058–1074)
Petar Snačić	c. 1075	c. 1091	Ban of Croatia according to a later addenda to Supetar Cartulary.	Demetrius Zvonimir (1075–1089)
Petar Snačić	c. 1075	c. 1091	Ban of Croatia according to a later addenda to Supetar Cartulary.	Stephen II (1089–1091)

== Croatian bans after 1102 ==
After the Croats elected King Coloman of Hungary as King of Croatia 1102, the title of ban acquired the meaning of viceroy. Bans were appointed by the Hungarian king as his representatives in Kingdom of Croatia, heads of the parliament (sabor) and also as supreme commander of Croatian Army.

Croatia was governed by the viceregal ban as a whole from 1102 until 1225, when it was split into two separate regions of Slavonia and Croatia. Two different bans were occasionally appointed until 1476, when the institution of a single ban was resumed. Most bans were native nobles but some were also of Hungarian ancestry. In the 13th and 14th centuries, the more extensive title of Duke of Slavonia (meaning all lands of the Kingdom of Croatia and Dalmatia and Slavonian domain) was also granted, mainly to relatives of Hungarian monarchs or other major noblemen. Most notable bans from this period were Pavao Šubić and Peter Berislavić.

=== Bans of Croatia, Dalmatia and Slavonia ===
Portrait	Name (Birth–Death)	Term start	Term end	Notes	Monarch (Reign)
	Ugra/Ugrin	1102	1105	In 1105 commanded the Hungarian fleet that successfully attacked the island of Rab and others in the Gulf of Kvarner, and remained for a year on the island of Krk as comes alongside another Slavic ban. In historiography by ancestry is considered to be a Hungarian, or Croatian nobleman.	Coloman (1102–1116)
	Sergije/Sergius	1105			Coloman (1102–1116)
	Klaudije	1116	1117		Stephen II (1116–1131)
	Aleksije/Alexius	c. 1130	c. 1141		Béla II (1131–1141)
	Beloš (1083–1163)	1142	c. 1158		Géza II (1141–1162)
	Apa	1158			Géza II (1141–1162)
	Beloš (1083–1163)	1163			Stephen III (1162–1172)
	Ampudije/Ampudin	1164	c. 1180		Stephen III (1162–1172)
	Maurus	1181			Béla III King Béla III (1172–1196)
	Denis/Dionysius	c. 1180	c. 1183	Ban only in the littoral part	Béla III King Béla III (1172–1196)
	Subanus/Šoban	1183	1185		Béla III King Béla III (1172–1196)
	Kalán Bár-Kalán (c. 1152–1218)	1190	1193		Béla III King Béla III (1172–1196)
	Dominic Miskolc	1194	c. 1195		Béla III King Béla III (1172–1196)
	Andrija	1198		for Duke Andrew	Emeric (1196–1204)
	Nicholas I of Transylvania	1198 (?)	1199	for King Emeric	Emeric (1196–1204)
	Benedict Osl	1199	1200	for King Emeric	Emeric (1196–1204)
	Nicholas, Palatine of Hungary	1200	1201 (?)	for Duke Andrew	Emeric (1196–1204)
	Martin Hont-Pázmány	1202		for Duke Andrew	Emeric (1196–1204)
	Hipolit	1204		for King Emeric	Emeric (1196–1204)
	Mercurius	1205	1206		Ladislaus III (1204–1205)
	Csépán Ják	1206	1207		Andrew II (1205–1235)
	Bánk Bár-Kalán	1208	1209		Andrew II (1205–1235)
	Thomas Monoszló	1209			Andrew II (1205–1235)
	Berthold Andechs-Merana	1209	1211		Andrew II (1205–1235)
	Michael Kacsics	1212			Andrew II (1205–1235)
	Martin Hont-Pázmány	1213			Andrew II (1205–1235)
	Julius I Kán	1213		Ban only in Slavonia	Andrew II (1205–1235)
	Simon Kacsics	1212	1214		Andrew II (1205–1235)
	Ohuz	1213	1214		Andrew II (1205–1235)
	Ivan	1215		Ban only in Slavonia	Andrew II (1205–1235)
	Pousa/Poša	1216		meanwhile in 1217 Pontius de Cruce was a regent of Croatia and Dalmatia	Andrew II (1205–1235)
	Bánk Bár-Kalán	1217	1218		Andrew II (1205–1235)
	Julius I Kán	1219		Ban only in Slavonia	Andrew II (1205–1235)
	Ernej/Ernst Hontpâzmân	c. 1220	1221		Andrew II (1205–1235)
	Ohuz	1219	1220		Andrew II (1205–1235)
	Solomon Atyusz	c. 1222	c. 1224		Andrew II (1205–1235)

=== Bans of Croatia and Dalmatia ===
From 1225 to 1476, there were parallel Bans of Croatia and Dalmatia and of Slavonia. The following is the list of the former, the latter are listed at the article Ban of Slavonia. During the period of separate titles of ban, several persons held both titles, which is indicated in the notes.

After the death of King Louis I of Hungary, his daughter Mary succeeded to the throne, which led to kings Charles III and Ladislaus of Naples claiming the Kingdom of Hungary. A war erupted between forces loyal to Mary, and later to her husband and successor Sigismund of Luxembourg, and those loyal to Ladislaus.

During this time, Sigismund appointed Nicholas II Garai (who was also count palatine) the Ban of Croatia and Dalmatia in 1392, Butko Kurjaković in 1394, and then again Garai in the period from 1394 to 1397. Nicholas II Garai was also at the time the Ban of Slavonia, succeeded by Ladislav Grđevački (1402–1404), Paul Besenyő (1404), Pavao Peć (1404–1406), Hermann II of Celje (1406–1408).

Ladislaus in turn appointed his own bans. In 1409, this dynastic struggle was resolved when Ladislaus sold his rights over Dalmatia to the Republic of Venice.

Portrait	Name (Birth–Death)	Term start	Term end	Notes	Monarch (Reign)
	Vojnić	1225			Andrew II (1205–1235)
	Valegin	1226			Andrew II (1205–1235)
	Stephen II Babonić	1243	1249		Béla IV (1235–1270)
	Butko of Podgorje	1259			Béla IV (1235–1270)
	Stephen of Klis	1263	1266		Béla IV (1235–1270)
	Nicholas Gutkeled	1275			Ladislaus IV (1272–1290)
	Pavao I Šubić	1278	1312		Ladislaus IV (1272–1290)
	Pavao I Šubić	1278	1312		Andrew III (1290–1301)
	Pavao I Šubić	1278	1312		Charles I (1301–1342)
	Mladen II Šubić	1312	1322		Charles I (1301–1342)
	John Babonić	1322	1322		Charles I (1301–1342)
	Nicholas Hahót	1345	1346		Louis I (1342–1383)
	Stephen I Lackfi	1350	1352		Louis I (1342–1383)
	John Csúz	1356	1358		Louis I (1342–1383)
	Nicholas Szécsi	1358	1366		Louis I (1342–1383)
	Kónya Szécsényi	1366	1367		Louis I (1342–1383)
	Emeric I Lackfi	1368			Louis I (1342–1383)
	Simon Mauritius of Pok	1369	1371		Louis I (1342–1383)
	Charles of Durazzo	1371	1376		Louis I (1342–1383)
	Nicholas Szécsi	1377	1380	Second term	Louis I (1342–1383)
	Emeric I Bebek	1380	1383		Louis I (1342–1383)
	Stephen II Lackfi	1383	1384		Mary (1382–1395)
	Thomas of St George	1384	1385		Mary (1382–1395)
	Ivan Paližna	1385	1386	Co-ruled with relative Ivan Anjou Horvat (1385–1387). Also at the time the Ban of Slavonia.	Mary (1382–1395)
	Ladislaus Lackfi	1387			Mary (1382–1395)
	Denis of Lučenec	1387	1389		Mary (1382–1395)
	Ivan Paližna	1389		Second term. Also at the time the Ban of Slavonia.	Mary (1382–1395)
	Butko Kurjaković	1394			Mary (1382–1395)
	Nicholas II Garai	1395	1397		Charles II (1385–1386)
	Hermann II of Celje	1406	1407	Also at the time the Ban of Slavonia.	Sigismund (1387–1437)
	Karlo Kurjaković	1408	1409		Sigismund (1387–1437)
	Ivan Kurjaković	1410	1411		Sigismund (1387–1437)
	Pavao Kurjaković	1410	1411	Co-ruled with Ivan Kurjaković.	Sigismund (1387–1437)
	Peter Albeni	1412	1413		Sigismund (1387–1437)
	John Albeni	1414	1419		Sigismund (1387–1437)
	Ivaniš Nelipić	1419	1419		Sigismund (1387–1437)
	Albert Nagymihályi	1419	1426		Sigismund (1387–1437)
	Nikola IV Frankopan	1426	1432	Son of Ban Ivan Frankopan	Sigismund (1387–1437)
	Ivan VI Frankopan	1434	1436		Sigismund (1387–1437)
	Stephen III Frankopan	1434	1437	Co-ruled with Ivan Frankopan and later Matko Talovac	Sigismund (1387–1437)
	Peter Talovac	1438	1453	Co-ruled with Matko Talovac and Franko Talovac	Albert I (1437–1439)
	Peter Talovac	1438	1453	Co-ruled with Matko Talovac and Franko Talovac	Vladislaus I (1440–1444)
	Peter Talovac	1438	1453	Co-ruled with Matko Talovac and Franko Talovac	Ladislaus V (1444–1457)
	Ladislaus Hunyad	1453			Ladislaus V (1444–1457)
	Pavao Špirančić	1459	1463		Ladislaus V (1444–1457)
	Pavao Špirančić	1459	1463		Matthias I (1458–1490)
	Stephen Frankopan	1463			Matthias I (1458–1490)
	Nicholas of Ilok	1457	1463	Also at the time the Ban of Slavonia (1457–1463)	Matthias I (1458–1490)
	Emeric Zápolya	1464	1465	Also at the time the Ban of Slavonia	Matthias I (1458–1490)
	John Thuz	1466	1467	Also at the time the Ban of Slavonia	Matthias I (1458–1490)
	Blaise Magyar	1470	1472	Also at the time the Ban of Slavonia	Matthias I (1458–1490)
	Damjan Horvat	1472	1473	Also at the time the Ban of Slavonia	Matthias I (1458–1490)

=== Bans of Dalmatia, Croatia and Slavonia ===
From 1476 onwards, the titles of Ban of Dalmatia and Croatia, and Ban of Slavonia are again united in the single title of Ban of Croatia, Slavonia and Dalmatia (banus regnorum Dalmatiae et Croatiae et totius Sclavoniae).

Portrait	Name (Birth–Death)	Term start	Term end	Notes	Monarch (Reign)
	Andrew Bánffy	1476	1477		Matthias I (1458–1490)
	Ladislaus of Egervár	1477	1481		Matthias I (1458–1490)
	Blaise Magyar	1482			Matthias I (1458–1490)
	Matthias Gereb	1483	1489	Known for the Battle of Una.	Matthias I (1458–1490)
	Ladislaus of Egervár	1489	1493		Matthias I (1458–1490)
	Ladislaus of Egervár	1489	1493		Vladislaus II (1490–1516)
	John Both	1493			Vladislaus II (1490–1516)
	Mirko Derenčin	1493		Known for the Battle of Krbava field.	Vladislaus II (1490–1516)
	Ladislaus Kanizsai	1493	1495		Vladislaus II (1490–1516)
	John Corvinus	1495	1498		Vladislaus II (1490–1516)
	George Kanizsai	1498	1499		Vladislaus II (1490–1516)
	John Corvinus	1499	1504		Vladislaus II (1490–1516)
	Andrew Both	1504	1507		Vladislaus II (1490–1516)
	Marko Mišljenović	1505	1507		Vladislaus II (1490–1516)
	John Ernuszt	1508	1509		Vladislaus II (1490–1516)
	George Kanizsai	1508	1509		Vladislaus II (1490–1516)
	Andrew Both	1510	1511		Vladislaus II (1490–1516)
	Emeric Perényi	1512	1513		Vladislaus II (1490–1516)
	Peter Berislavić	1513	1520	Known for the Battle of Dubica.	Vladislaus II (1490–1516)
	Peter Berislavić	1513	1520	Known for the Battle of Dubica.	Louis II (1516–1526)
	Ivan Karlović	1521	1524		Louis II (1516–1526)
	John Tahy	1525			Louis II (1516–1526)
	Ferenc Batthyány	1525	1526		Louis II (1516–1526)
	Christoph I Frankopan (1482–1527)	1526	1527	Appointed as supporter of John Zápolya	Louis II (1516–1526)

== Habsburg-era bans ==
The title of ban persisted in Croatia after 1527 when the country became part of the Habsburg monarchy, and continued all the way until 1918.

Among the most distinguished bans in Croatian history were the three members of Zrinski family Nikola Šubić Zrinski and his great-grandsons Nikola Zrinski and Petar Zrinski. Also there are two notable Erdődys: Toma Erdődy, great warrior and statesman, and Ivan Erdődy, to whom Croatia owes much for protecting her rights against the Hungarian nobility, his most widely known saying in Latin is Regnum regno non praescribit leges (A kingdom may not proscribe laws to another kingdom.)

In the 18th century, Croatian bans eventually became chief government officials in Croatia. They were at the head of Ban's Government, effectively the first prime ministers of Croatia. The most known bans of that era were Josip Jelačić, Ivan Mažuranić and Josip Šokčević.

=== Bans in the Habsburg Monarchy ===
The Habsburg dynasty ruled Kingdom of Croatia and Kingdom of Slavonia between 1527 and 1918.

Portrait	Name (Birth–Death)	Term start	Term end	Notes	Monarch (Reign)
	Ivan Karlović (c. 1485–1531)	1527	1531		Ferdinand I (1526–1564)
	Simon Erdődy (c. 1489–1543)	1530	1534		Ferdinand I (1526–1564)
	Louis Pekry	1532	1537		Ferdinand I (1526–1564)
	Thomas Nádasdy (1498–1562)	1537	1539		Ferdinand I (1526–1564)
	Peter Keglević (1478–c. 1554)	1537	1542		Ferdinand I (1526–1564)
	Nikola Šubić Zrinski (1508–c. 1566)	1542	1556		Ferdinand I (1526–1564)
	Péter Erdődy (1508–c. 1566)	1557	1567		Ferdinand I (1526–1564)
	Franjo Frankopan Slunjski	1567	1572		Maximilian II (1563–1576)
	Juraj Drašković (1525–1587)	1567	1576		Maximilian II (1563–1576)
	Gašpar Alapić (?–1584)	1575	1577		Maximilian II (1563–1576)
	Kristóf Ungnad	1578	1583		Rudolf II (1572–1608)
	Thomas Erdődy (1558–1624)	1583	1595		Rudolf II (1572–1608)
	Gašpar Stankovački (1555–1596)	1595	1596		Rudolf II (1572–1608)
	Ivan II Drašković (1550–1613)	1595	1607		Rudolf II (1572–1608)
	Thomas Erdődy (1558–1624)	1608	1615		Matthias II (1608–1618)
	Benedict Thuroczy	1615	1616		Matthias II (1608–1618)
	Nikola IX Frankopan (1584–1647)	1617	1622		Matthias II (1608–1618)
	Juraj V Zrinski (1599–1626)	1622	1626		Ferdinand II (1618–1637)
	Sigismund Erdődy (1596–1639)	1627	1639		Ferdinand II (1618–1637)
	Ivan III Drašković (1595–1648)	1640	1646		Ferdinand III (1625–1657)
	Nikola Zrinski (1620–1664)	1647	1664		Ferdinand III (1625–1657)
	Peter Zrinski (1621–1671)	1665	1670		Leopold I (1657–1705)
	Miklós Erdődy (1630–1693)	1670	1693		Leopold I (1657–1705)
	Adam II. Batthyány (1662–1703)	1693	1703		Leopold I (1657–1705)
	János Pálffy (1664–1751)	1704	1732		Joseph I (1705–1711)
	Ivan V Drašković (1660–1733)	1732	1733		Charles VI (1711–1740)
	Josef Esterházy (1682–1748)	1733	1741		Charles VI (1711–1740)
	György Branyng (1677–1748)	1741	1742		Maria Theresa (1740–1780)
	Karl Josef Batthyány (1697–1772)	16 March 1743	6 July 1756		Maria Theresa (1740–1780)
	Ferenc Nádasdy (1708–1783)	1756	1783		Maria Theresa (1740–1780)
	Ferenc Eszterházy (1715–1785)	1783	1785		Joseph II (1780–1790)
	Ferenc Balassa (1736–1807)	1785	1790		Joseph II (1780–1790)
	Ivan Erdődy (1733–1806)	1790	1806		Leopold II (1790–1792)
	Ignác Gyulay (1763–1831)	1806	1831		Francis II (1792–1835)
	Franjo Vlašić (1766–1840)	10 February 1832	16 May 1840		Ferdinand V (1835–1848)
	Juraj Haulik (1788–1869)	1840	16 June 1842	Acting ban	Ferdinand V (1835–1848)
	Franz Haller (1796–1875)	16 June 1842	1845		Ferdinand V (1835–1848)
	Juraj Haulik (1788–1869)	1845	23 March 1848	Acting ban	Ferdinand V (1835–1848)

=== Bans after the Revolutions of 1848 ===
Croatia was a Habsburg crown territory during the Revolutions of 1848 and remained one up until 1867.

Portrait	Name (Birth–Death)	Term start	Term end	Notes	Monarch (Reign)
	Josip Jelačić (1801–1859)	23 March 1848	19 May 1859		Franz Joseph I (1848–1916)
	Johann Baptist Coronini-Cronberg (1794–1880)	28 July 1859	19 June 1860		Franz Joseph I (1848–1916)
	Josip Šokčević (1811–1896)	19 June 1860	27 June 1867		Franz Joseph I (1848–1916)

=== Bans in Austria-Hungary ===
Croatia was returned to Hungarian control in 1867 when the Habsburg Empire was reconstituted as the dual monarchy of Austria-Hungary. Between then and 1918 the following bans were appointed:

Portrait	Name (Birth–Death)	Term start	Term end	Notes	Monarch (Reign)
	Levin Rauch (1819–1890)	27 June 1867	26 January 1871	Member of the Unionist Party that advocated for more integration of Croatia into Hungary. Notable for securing victory of the Unionist Party through changing the election law and terrorising those who were able to vote.	Franz Joseph I (1848–1916)
	Koloman Bedeković (1818–1889)	26 January 1871	12 February 1872	Bedeković was the leader of the Unionist Party and fought against Croatia's autonomy from Hungary. Dissatisfaction with the obstruction of parliament led to the Rakovica Revolt. Early elections were subsequently called for in 1872. The failure of Bedeković to convene the previous parliament resulted in him being removed from the post of ban and replaced with the first non-noble ban, Ivan Mažuranić.	Franz Joseph I (1848–1916)
	Antun Vakanović (1808–1894)	17 February 1872	20 September 1873	Acting ban	Franz Joseph I (1848–1916)
	Ivan Mažuranić (1814–1890)	20 September 1873	21 February 1880	Mažuranić was the first Croatian ban not to hail from old nobility, as he was born a commoner. He was a member of the People's Party. He accomplished the transition of Croatian lands from a semi-feudal legal and economic system to a modern civil society similar to those emerging in other countries in Central Europe.	Franz Joseph I (1848–1916)
	Ladislav Pejačević (1824–1901)	21 February 1880	4 September 1883	As the reincorporation of the Military Frontier into the Kingdom of Croatia-Slavonia was proclaimed on 15 July 1881, Pejačević was given the task to follow it through. On 1 August 1881, he took over the administration of the former Frontier. On 24 August 1883, he quit after the Council of Ministers in Vienna concluded that bilingual Hungarian official emblems, installed by Hungarian officials in Croatia-Slavonia, were not allowed to be removed from the official buildings and were to stay along the Croatian ones.	Franz Joseph I (1848–1916)
	Hermann Ramberg (1820–1899)	4 September 1883	1 December 1883	Acting ban	Franz Joseph I (1848–1916)
	Karoly Khuen-Héderváry (1849–1918)	4 December 1883	27 June 1903	Khuen's reign was marked by strong Magyarization. After a series of riots broke out against him in 1903, Khuen was relieved of his duty and appointed prime minister of Hungary.	Franz Joseph I (1848–1916)
	Teodor Pejačević (1855–1928)	27 June 1903	26 June 1907	At the beginning of the 20th century, he was faced with a new direction of Croatian policy marked by political alliance between Croats and Serbs in Austria-Hungary for mutual benefit. A Croat-Serb Coalition was formed in 1905, and it governed the Croatian lands from 1906 until the dissolution of the Dual Monarchy in 1918. As Pejačević supported the ruling Coalition in its resistance towards the Hungarian request in 1907 to make the Hungarian language an official language on railways in Croatia, he was forced to resign.	Franz Joseph I (1848–1916)
	Aleksandar Rakodczaj (1848–1924)	26 June 1907	8 January 1908		Franz Joseph I (1848–1916)
	Pavao Rauch (1865–1933)	8 January 1908	5 February 1910	From the very beginning of Rauch's rule, the Croato-Serbian Coalition announced that it would refuse to co-operate in any manner with the new unionist ban. After the Croatian Parliament had been disbanded on 12 March 1908, because of its refusal to co-operate and the insults it directed at the ban, Pavao Rauch ruled through decrees and civil servants. Despite all opposition predictions, Rauch remained in power for two years. On 5 February 1910, he received the king's letter of dismissal.	Franz Joseph I (1848–1916)
	Nikola Tomašić (1864–1918)	5 February 1910	19 January 1912		Franz Joseph I (1848–1916)
	Slavko Cuvaj (1851–1931)	19 January 1912	21 July 1913	He was appointed in January 1912, when anti-Habsburg sentiments were on the rise in Croatia, often manifesting in sympathies for Serbia and calls for creation of a Yugoslav state. Cuvaj tried to curb those trends by series of decrees directed at curbing the freedom of the press, limiting rights of assembly and local autonomy. This created a backlash in the form of strikes and demonstrations. Some young radicals even engaged in terrorism. Cuvaj himself was target of two assassination attempts in 1912.	Franz Joseph I (1848–1916)
	Ivan Skerlecz (1873–1951)	21 July 1913	29 June 1917	Skerlecz managed to reconvene the Croatian Parliament in Zagreb by 1915. The Croats made further demands for local authority, as well as unification of Croatia-Slavonia with Dalmatia and Bosnia and Herzegovina.	Franz Joseph I (1848–1916)
	Ivan Skerlecz (1873–1951)	21 July 1913	29 June 1917	Skerlecz managed to reconvene the Croatian Parliament in Zagreb by 1915. The Croats made further demands for local authority, as well as unification of Croatia-Slavonia with Dalmatia and Bosnia and Herzegovina.	Charles IV (1916–1919)
	Antun Mihalović (1868–1949)	29 June 1917	20 January 1919		Charles IV (1916–1919)

== Croatian bans in the Kingdom of Yugoslavia ==
Ban was also the title of the governor of each province (banovina) of the Kingdom of Yugoslavia between 1929 and 1941. The weight of the title was far less than that of a medieval ban's feudal office. Most of Croatian territory was divided between the Sava and Littoral Banovina, but also some parts were outside this provinces.

In 1939 Banovina of Croatia was created with Cvetković-Maček agreement as a unit of limited autonomy. It consisted of the Sava and Littoral Banovinas along with smaller parts of Vrbas, Zeta, Drina and Danube Banovina's. Ivan Šubašić was appointed for the Ban of Banovina of Croatia until the collapse of Kingdom of Yugoslavia in 1941. Šubašić was also the last person who held the position of Croatian Ban.

=== Bans within the Kingdom of Serbs, Croats and Slovenes ===
Following a brief period of self-rule at the end of World War I, Croatia was incorporated into the Kingdom of the Serbs, Croats and Slovenes in 1918, under the Karađorđević dynasty.

Portrait	Name (Birth–Death)	Term start	Term end	Notes	Monarch (Reign)
	Ivan Paleček (1868–1945)	20 January 1919	24 November 1919		Peter I (1918–1921)
	Tomislav Tomljenović (1877–1945)	25 November 1919	19 February 1920		Peter I (1918–1921)
	Matko Laginja (1852–1930)	20 February 1920	28 November 1920		Peter I (1918–1921)
	Teodor Bošnjak (1876–1942)	28 November 1920	28 February 1921		Peter I (1918–1921)
	Tomislav Tomljenović (1877–1945)	28 February 1921	28 June 1921		Peter I (1918–1921)

=== Bans of the Sava Banovina ===
In 1929, the new Constitution of the Kingdom renamed it Kingdom of Yugoslavia and split up the country into banovinas.

Portrait	Name (Birth–Death)	Term start	Term end	Notes	Monarch (Reign)
	Josip Šilović (1858–1939)	3 October 1929	10 January 1931		Alexander I (1921–1934)
	Ivo Perović (1881–1958)	11 January 1931	11 October 1934		Alexander I (1921–1934)
	Marko Kostrenčić (1884–1976)	11 October 1934	2 May 1936		Peter II (1934–1941)
	Viktor Ružić (1893–1976)	2 May 1936	25 August 1938		Peter II (1934–1941)
	Stanoje Mihaldžić (1892–1956)	25 August 1938	26 August 1939		Peter II (1934–1941)

=== Bans of the Littoral Banovina ===
Portrait	Name (Birth–Death)	Term start	Term end	Notes	Monarch (Reign)
	Ivo Tartaglia (1880–1949)	9 October 1929	5 July 1932		Alexander I (1921–1934)
	Josip Jablanović (1875–1961)	5 July 1932	20 September 1938		Alexander I (1921–1934)
	Mirko Buić (1894–1967)	20 September 1938	26 August 1939		Peter II (1934–1941)

=== Bans of the Banovina of Croatia ===
In 1939, the Banovina of Croatia was created with Cvetković-Maček agreement as a unit of limited autonomy within Kingdom of Yugoslavia. It consisted of the Sava and Littoral Banovinas along with smaller parts of Vrbas, Zeta, Drina and Danube Banovinas.

Portrait	Name (Birth–Death)	Term start	Term end	Notes	Monarch (Reign)
	Ivan Šubašić (1892 –1955)	26 August 1939	10 April 1941	Last person to hold the title of ban.	Peter II (1934–1941)

== See also ==
- Croatian Parliament
- List of rulers of Croatia
- History of Croatia
- Timeline of Croatian history
- Tabula Banalis
