= Siege of Zadar (998) =

Part of the third Croatian-Bulgarian war

Coordinates: 44.116667°N 15.216667°E

- Part of the Croatian–Bulgarian wars
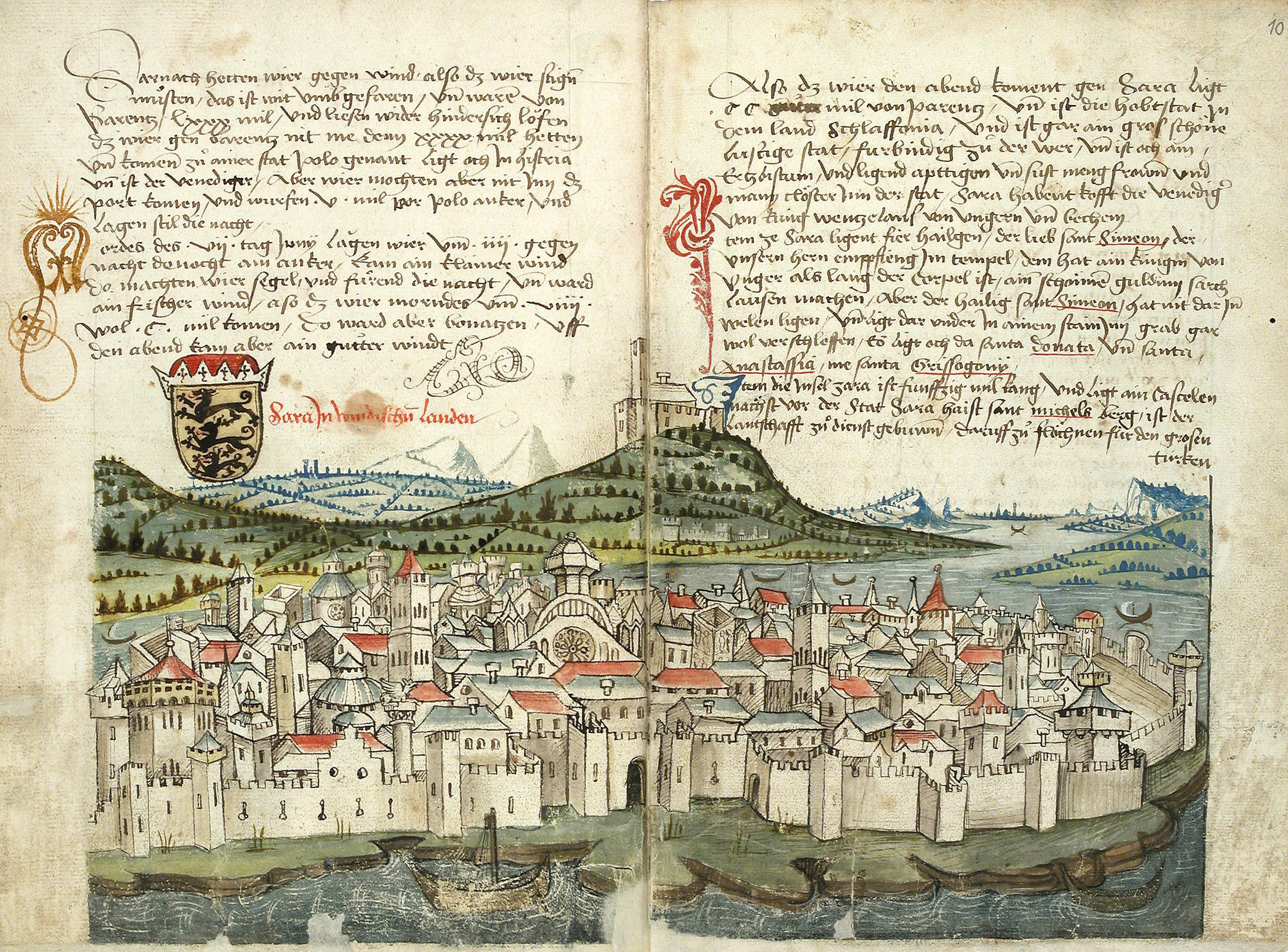
- Image of Zadar in the Middle Ages
Date	998
Location	Zadar, Theme of Dalmatia, Kingdom of Croatia
Result	Inconclusive: Eventual retreat of the Bulgarian forces

Belligerents
Bulgarian Empire	Kingdom of Croatia; Support: Principality of Serbia; Byzantine Empire

Commanders and leaders
Samuil	Svetoslav

Casualties and losses
Heavy	Heavy

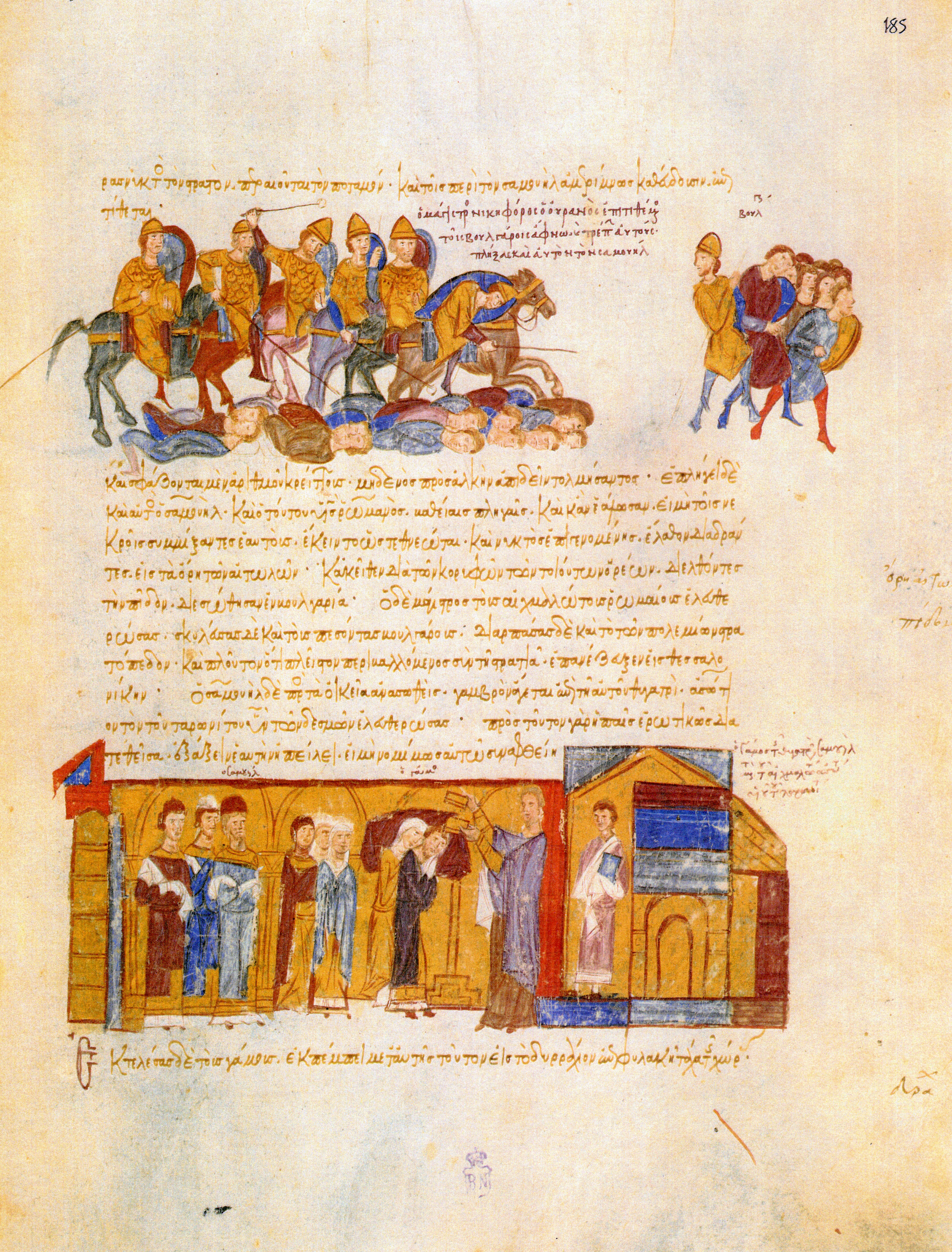
Depiction of one of the battles involving Samuil's army

The siege of Zadar in 998 was part of the third Croatian–Bulgarian war and one of the last military conflicts between Croatian forces of King Svetoslav Suronja (r. 997–1000), supported by Venice and the Byzantine Empire, and the army of Emperor Samuil (r. 997–1014), who launched a large-scale Bulgarian military campaign against the Kingdom of Croatia.

Samuil's army besieged the fortified city of Zadar in order to aid the king's rebel brothers Krešimir and Gojslav, who asked Samuil to come and help them to remove Svetoslav Suronja from the Croatian throne. The siege was unsuccessful and Samuil's forces withdrew in the direction of the Croatian hinterland and Bosnia, finally tracing their way back home.

== Background ==
In the last three decades of the 10th century, the Kingdom of Croatia was ruled by Stjepan Držislav, an ally of the Byzantine Empire, which in turn recognized him as the King of Croatia and Dalmatia. After his death in 997, his son and successor Svetoslav Suronja continued the pro-Byzantine policy of his father, but his younger brothers Krešimir and Gojslav started to organize a rebellion against him, since he rejected to share power over the Kingdom. The brothers asked Samuil, the new ruler of the Bulgarian Empire, also called the Western Bulgarian–Macedonian Empire, for help, knowing that he was at war with the Byzantine Empire.

The Byzantines had conquered the north-eastern regions of the Bulgarian Empire in 971, including the capital Preslav, and in the beginning of his rule Samuil controlled only the western half of the country centred in the important province of Kutmichevitsa (approximately present-day Republic of Macedonia and southern Albania). At first he controlled only the Slavic Macedonians' lands at the southwestern part of the former large Bulgarian Empire, but later conquered a lot of Balkans.

By 997, however, he had liberated north-eastern Bulgaria and pushed the Empire's borders south to include Thessaly. At the height of his power, Samuil accepted the proposal of Croatian rebel princes. He attacked Croatia in 998, starting the Third Croatian–Bulgarian war. In his military campaign, he took almost all of the Dalmatian coast of Croatia up to the Zadar area, including cities like Trogir and Split. King Svetoslav Suronja was forced to withdraw westwards, in the direction of Zadar.

== Siege ==
Having taken the most of Dalmatia, Tsar Samuil turned his army further to the west and besieged the city of Zadar. It is not known whether King Svetoslav Suronja resided in the city during the siege and led the defence forces himself, but the large and thick stone city walls, as well as its defenders, resisted the attack and the siege failed. Having had no success, Samuil's army withdrew from the siege and then marched towards the Croatian hinterlands, including the territory which is now part of Bosnia and Herzegovina. Later, the Bulgarian army returned home using the Bosnian route. Thus, the third and last of three Croatian–Bulgarian wars came to its end.

== Aftermath ==
The Croatian territory conquered by Samuil's forces during the campaign was taken over by Krešimir and Gojslav, who finally won the Croatian civil war and came to power in the Kingdom in 1000. Svetoslav Suronja, the Byzantine and Venetian ally, was forced into exile. When the Byzantines eventually conquered the Bulgarian Empire in 1018 after 50 years of bitter warfare, Krešimir and Gojslav became Byzantine vassals.

== See also ==
- Croatian–Bulgarian battle of 926 or 927
- Medieval Bulgarian army
- Timeline of Croatian history
- Military history of Bulgaria
- Military history of Croatia
- List of Bulgarian monarchs
- List of Croatian rulers
