= 997 =

Calendar year

997 in various calendars
- Gregorian calendar: 997; CMXCVII
- Ab urbe condita: 1750
- Armenian calendar: 446; ԹՎ ՆԽԶ
- Assyrian calendar: 5747
- Balinese saka calendar: 918–919
- Bengali calendar: 403–404
- Berber calendar: 1947
- Buddhist calendar: 1541
- Burmese calendar: 359
- Byzantine calendar: 6505–6506
- Chinese calendar: 丙申年 (Fire Monkey); 3694 or 3487 — to — 丁酉年 (Fire Rooster); 3695 or 3488
- Coptic calendar: 713–714
- Discordian calendar: 2163
- Ethiopian calendar: 989–990
- Hebrew calendar: 4757–4758
- Hindu calendars
- Vikram Samvat: 1053–1054
- Shaka Samvat: 918–919
- Kali Yuga: 4097–4098
- Holocene calendar: 10997
- Iranian calendar: 375–376
- Islamic calendar: 386–387
- Japanese calendar: Chōtoku 3 (長徳３年)
- Javanese calendar: 898–899
- Julian calendar: 997; CMXCVII
- Korean calendar: 3330
- Minguo calendar: 915 before ROC 民前915年
- Nanakshahi calendar: −471
- Seleucid era: 1308/1309 AG
- Thai solar calendar: 1539–1540
- Tibetan calendar: མེ་ཕོ་སྤྲེ་ལོ་ (male Fire-Monkey); 1123 or 742 or −30 — to — མེ་མོ་བྱ་ལོ་ (female Fire-Bird); 1124 or 743 or −29

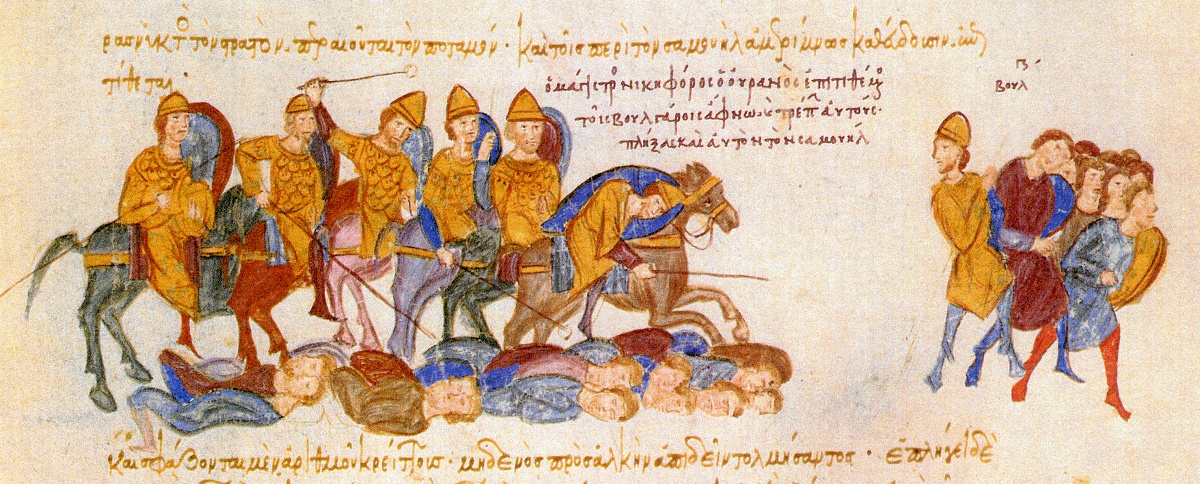
The Bulgars are put to flight at the Battle of Spercheios (Chronicle of John Skylitzes).

Year 997 (CMXCVII) was a common year starting on Friday of the Julian calendar.

== Events ==
=== By place ===
==== Japan ====
- 1 February: Empress Teishi gives birth to Princess Shushi - she is the first child of the emperor, but because of the power struggle between Michinaga and Korechika, the empress is not allowed to go to the palace.
- 18 May: The imperial court decides to pardon Korechika and Takaie, under the illness of Teishi.

==== Byzantine Empire ====
- July 16 – Battle of Spercheios: Byzantine forces, under General Nikephoros Ouranos, defeat the Bulgarians at the Spercheios River in Greece. During a night battle, the Bulgarian co-ruler Samuel is wounded; he and his son Gavril Radomir evade capture, by feigning death among the bodies of their slain soldiers. Samuel sets off to Bulgaria, and retreats with the remnants of his army, into the Pindus Mountains. Ouranos returns to Constantinople, with 1,000 heads of Bulgarian soldiers and 12,000 captives.

==== Europe ====
- Al-Mansur, the de facto ruler of Al-Andalus, assaults and partially destroys the city of Santiago de Compostela. He is accompanied in his raid by Christian Portuguese lords, who all receive a share of the booty. On their way, they sack the cities of Zamora and León.
- Summer – Roman of Bulgaria dies in captivity in Constantinople. He is succeeded by his brother Samuel (a member of the Cometopuli dynasty) who takes the Bulgarian title of tsar. He possibly receives his 'imperial crown' from Gregory V (approximate date).
- King Stephen Držislav of Croatia dies after a 28-year reign. His three sons, Svetoslav, Krešimir III and Gojslav, open a violent contest for the throne, weakening the kingdom and allowing Samuel to encroach on the Croatian possessions along the Adriatic.
- Winter – Emperor Otto III travels to Italy, leaving the government of the Holy Roman Empire in the hands of his aunt, Matilda of Quedlinburg. He is accompanied by Bishop Gilbert of Aurillac, his teacher and advisor.
- Trondheim is founded by King Olav Tryggvason. This will function as the main city and capital of Norway, until Bergen is founded in 1070.

==== Scotland ====
- King Constantine III dies after a 2-year reign, possibly murdered by a dynastic conflict between two rival lines of royalty. He is succeeded by Kenneth III as sole ruler of Alba (Scotland).

==== Central Asia ====
- Sabuktigin, founder of the Ghaznavid dynasty, dies after a 20-year reign. He is succeeded by his son Ismail as emir of Ghazna. But many in the court favor his elder brother Mahmud.

==== China ====
- May 8 – Emperor Tai Zong (Zhao Jiong) dies at Kaifeng after a 21-year reign. He is succeeded by his son Zhen Zong as the third ruler of the Song dynasty.

=== By topic ===
==== Religion ====
- Spring – Pope Gregory V is exiled during a rebellion led by Crescentius II (the Younger), patrician (the de facto ruler) of Rome. The Crescentii family appoints Giovanni Filagato (former tutor of Otto III) as an antipope under the name John XVI (or XVII), until 998.
- April 23 – Adalbert, exiled bishop of Prague, organises a mission to convert the Old Prussians in north-east Poland. On his way, Adalbert is murdered by pagans on the Baltic coast. His body is bought back for its weight in gold by Duke Bolesław I (the Brave).
- The first documented reference of Gdańsk is made by Adalbert. During his mission he baptises the inhabitants of the city called Gyddannyzc.

== Births ==
- Alan III (de Bretagne), duke of Brittany (d. 1040)
- Bertha of Milan, Lombard duchess and regent (approximate date)
- Godfrey III, duke of Lower Lorraine (approximate date)
- Gusiluo, Tibetan religious leader of Buddhism (d. 1065)
- Gytha Thorkelsdóttir, Danish noblewoman (approximate date)
- Ibn al-Wafid, Andalusian pharmacologist (d. 1074)
- Rhys ap Tewdwr, king of Deheubarth (d. 1093)

== Deaths ==
- April 23 – Adalbert of Prague, Bohemian bishop
- May 8 – Tai Zong, Chinese emperor (b. 939)
- July 23 – Nuh II, Samanid emir (b. 963)
- August 20 – Conrad I, duke of Swabia
- October 6 – Minamoto no Mitsunaka, Japanese samurai (b. 912)
- November 29 – Seongjong, Korean king (b. 961)
- Abu Bakr Ibn Al-Qutia, Andalusian historian
- Constantine III, king of Alba (Scotland)
- Géza (or Gejza), Grand Prince of Hungary
- Gonzalo Menéndez, Portuguese nobleman
- Gonzalo Sánchez, count of Aragon (Spain)
- Ibn Battah al-Ukbari, Arab theologian (b. 917)
- Idwal ap Meurig, king of Gwynedd (Wales)
- Máel Coluim, king of Strathclyde (Scotland)
- Waldrada of Tuscany, dogaressa of Venice
- Ma'mun I ibn Muhammad, ruler of Khwarezm
- Roman, ruler (tsar) of the Bulgarian Empire
- Sabuktigin, founder of the Ghaznavid dynasty
- Stephen Držislav (Dirzislaus), king of Croatia
- Tailapa II, ruler of the Western Chalukya Empire
- Teresa Ansúrez, queen and regent of León
