= Stephen (honorific) =

Honorific title in historic Serbia monarchy

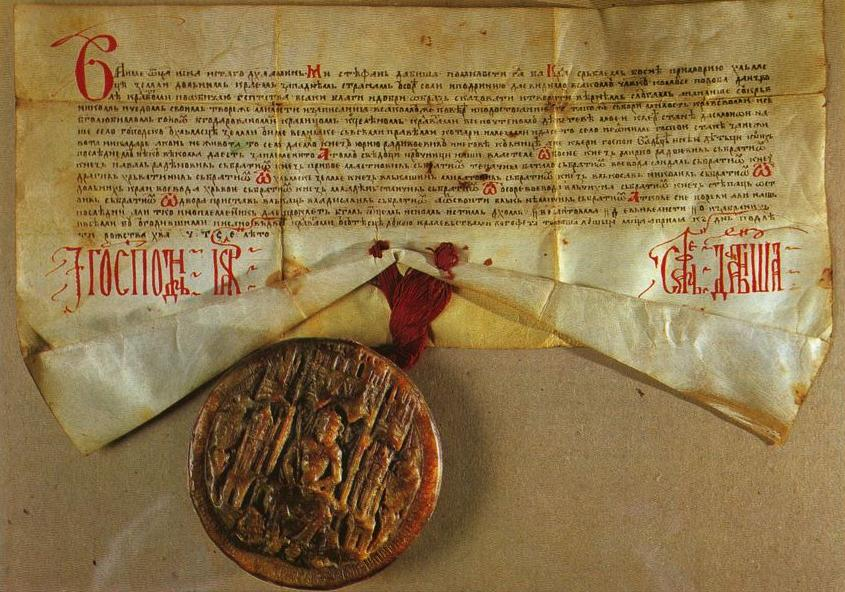
Charter of King Stephen Dabiša of Bosnia; his name is in the bottom right corner

The name Stephen (Serbo-Croatian: Stefan / Стефан, Stjepan / Стјепан, Stipan / Стипан, and others), long popular among South Slavic monarchs, was used as an honorific or as a royal title. It was used by various rulers, like the Trpimirović kings of Croatia, Vojislavljević kings of Duklja, Nemanjić kings of Serbia and the Kotromanić kings of Bosnia.

== Onomastics ==
The name Stephen is derived from Greek Stephanos (Στέφανος, tr. Stéphanos), meaning literally "crown". Early Slavs did not use the voice /f/, so the Greek Stephanos was adapted into Stjepan (Стјепан) and Stipan (Стипан) in modern-day Bosnia-Herzegovina and Croatia, Šćepan (Шћепан) in modern-day Montenegro, and Stevan (Стеван) and Stepan (Степан) in modern-day Serbia. The name has had hundreds of variants in Serbo-Croatian, most of which are hypocoristics that can now only be deduced from surnames. The Serbian Orthodox Church, however, retained the original pronunciation (minus the suffix -os) in its liturgy, leading to the form Stefan (Стєфань) being used to refer to the (mostly canonized) Serbian kings. The Swiss Slavist Robert Zett noted that the usage of Stefan indicated social hierarchy, being an honorific rather than a regnal name: while Uroš I (r. 1243–76) used Stefan, his son was christened Stepan. Uroš IV Dušan (r. 1331–55) signed as Stefan but humbly used Stepan in a prayer book. Some Serbian kings minted coins with St. Stephen called Stefan on the obverse and themselves called Stepan on the reverse.

== History ==
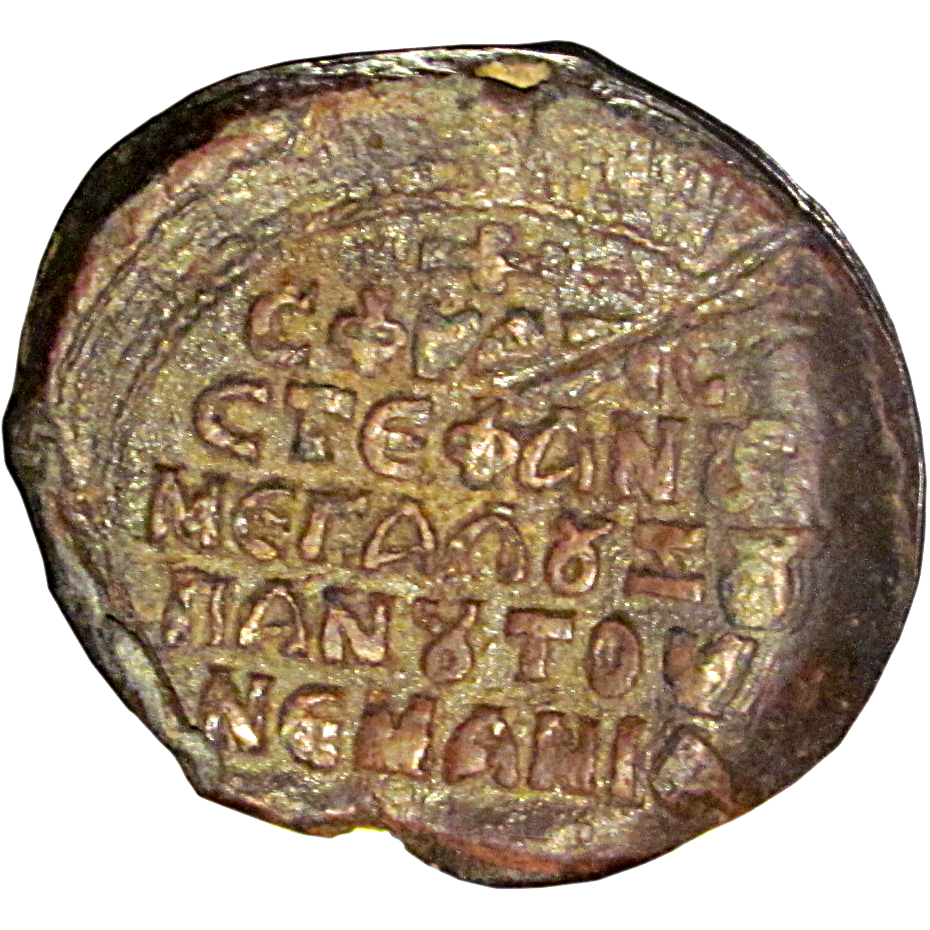
Seal of Stefan Nemanjic, king of Serbia, 11th century

The name Stephen enjoyed great popularity among medieval South Slavic rulers. With the Christianization of South Slavs, Christian names begin to appear in rulers; in the generation after Serbian ruler Mutimir (r. 850–891), Stephen and Peter are found. Several members of the Trpimirović kings of Croatia had the name, such as Stephen Držislav (r. 969–997), Stephen I (r. 1030–58) and Stephen II (r. 1089–91). It was also adopted as a second name upon accession, a Christian name in addition to the Slavic ("folk") name, as was the case with Stephen Držislav, and several Serbian rulers, Stefan Vojislav (r. 1018–43), and the brothers Miroslav, Stracimir and Nemanja. Several bans of Bosnia also held it: Stephen Vojislavljević (fl. 1084-95), Stephen Kulinić (r. 1204–32) and the Kotromanić bans Stephen I (r. 1287–99) and Stephen II (r. 1322–53).

The royal tradition of using the name Stefan as an honorific added to the original Slavic name began with the Serbian grand prince Nemanja (r. 1166–96). His son Stephen (r. 1196–1228) had himself crowned king, and all the subsequent Nemanjić kings of Serbia took the honorific Stephen in addition to their Slavic name upon their accession. The popularity of the name in medieval Serbia stems from the influence of Byzantine culture and the status of Stephen the Protomartyr as both patron saint of Serbia and symbol of the Byzantine Empire. The veneration of Saint Stephen was so important that he was depicted on the reverse of the royal seals of the early Nemanjić rulers and on their basic coins. Historians such as Dušan J. Popović and John Van Antwerp Fine, Jr. maintain that to Serbian rulers, Stephen was more than "a mere name" and "came close to being part of a title". According to Sima Ćirković, it had a special symbolical meaning to the Serbian state.

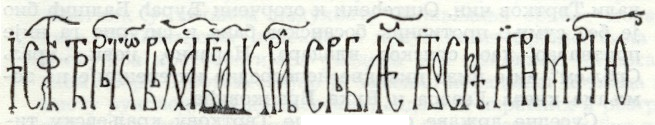
Signature of Stephen Tvrtko I

When the Nemanjić line went extinct with the death of Stephen Uroš V (r. 1355–71) in 1371, Serbia's throne became vacant and the country disintegrated. The Bosnian ban Tvrtko I (r. 1353–91), a cognatic great-grandson of Stephen Dragutin (r. 1276–1316), started advancing his own claim on the defunct kingdom and had himself crowned King of Serbia and Bosnia in 1377. In an effort to emulate the Nemanjić, Tvrtko added the name Stephen to his own and at times even omitted his real name, using only the royal honorific. Even though the Kotromanić claim to Serbia lost all practical significance already during Stephen Tvrtko I's reign, the subsequent kings of Bosnia followed his suit and adopted the name Stephen upon accession. The last of them, Stephen Tomašević (r. 1461–63), having been christened with the name, even called himself Stefan Štipan (Стефан Штипан) or Štefan Stipan (Штефан Стипан) after his accession (effectively being "Stephen Stephen").

The kings of Bosnia were not the only to claim the title Stephen. They were never accepted as suzerains by the lords of petty states that developed following the disintegration of the Serbian Empire. Lazar Hrebeljanović (r. 1373–89) and his son-in-law Vuk Branković (r. 1378–89), who ruled two of these states, at times called themselves Stefan although they never claimed the kingship.

== Sources ==
- Brković, Mirko (1998). "Povelja bosanskog kralja Tvrtka I. Mlečanima iz godine 1385. (23. VIII); Latinska povelja bosanskog kralja Tvrtka I. izdana Braču godine 1390". Radovi Zavoda za povijesne znanosti HAZU u Zadru. 40. Zadar: Hrvatska akademija znanosti i umjetnosti. Zavod za povijesne znanosti Zadar.
- Budak, Neven (2010). "Hrvatska i Bizant u 10. stoljeću" [Croatia and Byzantium in the 10th century]. Tabula (in Croatian). Pula: Juraj Dobrila University of Pula: 51–63. doi:10.32728/tab.12.2014.05.
- Ćirković, Sima M. (1964). Istorija srednjovekovne bosanske države. Srpska književna zadruga.
- Fine, John Van Antwerp Jr. (1994). The Late Medieval Balkans: A Critical Survey from the Late Twelfth Century to the Ottoman Conquest. Michigan: University of Michigan Press. ISBN 0-472-08260-4.
- Maguire, Henry (2004). Byzantine court culture from 829 to 1204. Dumbarton Oaks. ISBN 978-0-88402-308-1.
- Marjanović-Dušanić, Smilja (1997). Vladarska ideologija Nemanjića: diplomatička studija. Srpska književna zadruga. ISBN 978-86-379-0637-7.
- Matica srpska (1975). Proceedings in history. Novi Sad: Odeljenje za društvene nauke, Matica srpska.
- SANU (1959). Glasnik (in Serbian). Vol. 11. SANU.
- Šimunović, Petar (1995). Hrvatska prezimena: podrijetlo, značenje, rasprostranjenost. Golden Marketing. ISBN 953-6168-16-2.
- Vlasto, A. P. (1970). The Entry of the Slavs Into Christendom: An Introduction to the Medieval History of the Slavs. CUP Archive. ISBN 978-0-521-07459-9.
