= Stjepan Svetoslavić =

Ban of Slavonia
- In office c. 1030 – 1060
- Monarch: Stephen I
- Succeeded by: Demetrius Zvonimir

Personal details
- Children: Demetrius Zvonimir
- Parent: Svetoslav (father)

Stjepan was a son of Croatian King Svetoslav Suronja, member of Trpimirović dynasty.

As his father was allied with Venetian Republic in Croatian civil wars and Croatian-Bulgarian wars, as well as in campaign of Pietro II Orseolo against Croatia in 1000, it was decided to strengthen those bonds even more.

After the coup d'état in Venice, Svetoslav Suronja and his family went to Hungary in exile and died.

Stjepan used the anarchy and made a conquest in Croatian Slavonia with Hungarians against the fratricide king. Stjepan later received the title Ban of Slavonia.

He was the father of Demetrius Zvonimir of Croatia.
