= Krešimir Berto Balabanić =

Croatian poet

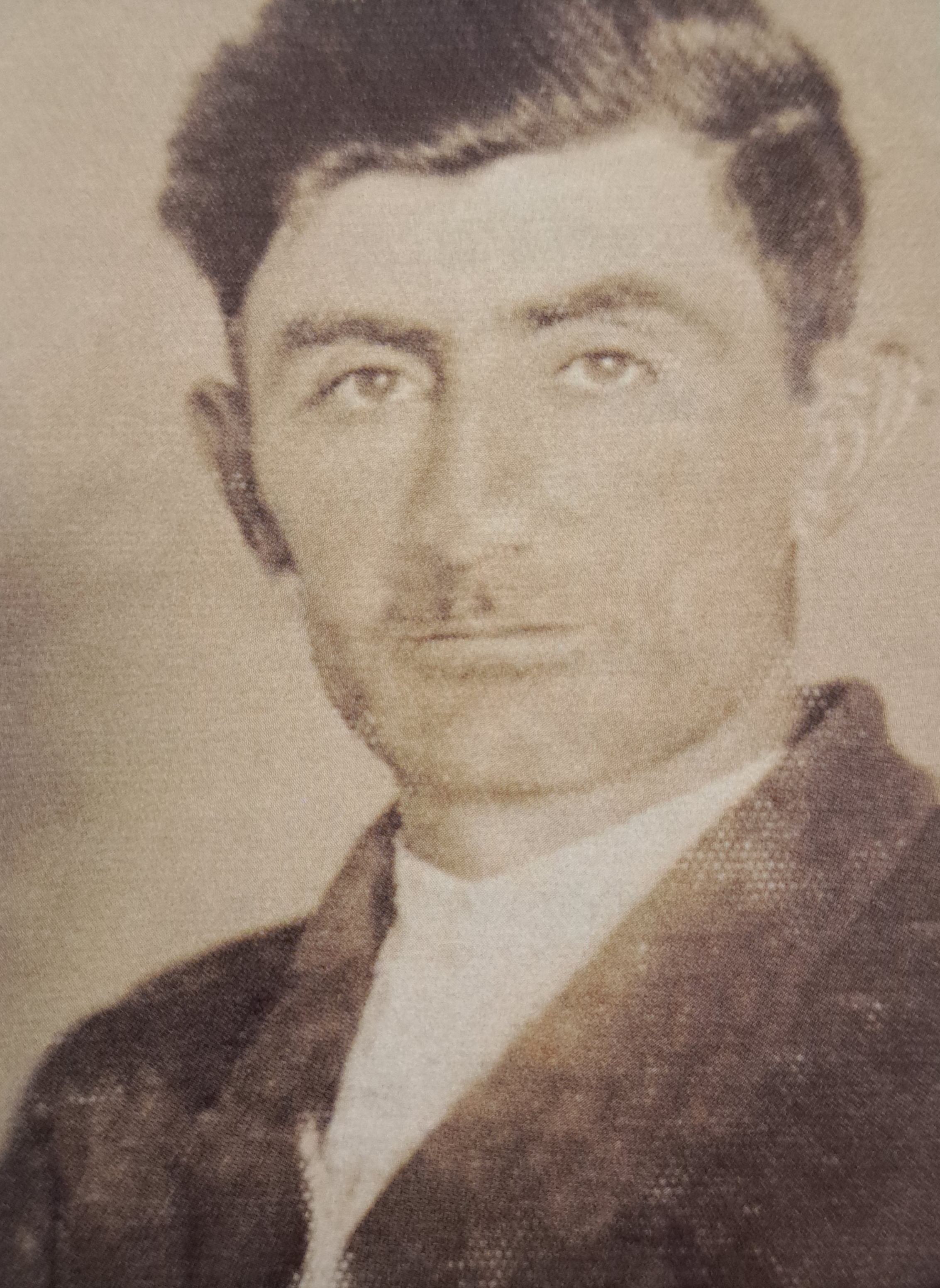
- Berto in younger days
- Born: 20 July 1909; Kolan, Island of Pag
- Died: 25 October 1987 (aged 78); Kolan, Island of Pag
- Occupations: Farmer, Poet
- Spouse: Stoše (born Zubović)
- Children: 4

Krešimir Berto Balabanić (20 July 1909 – 25 October 1987) was a Croatian folk poet from the island of Pag. His work is studied and taught to students at the Department of Croatian Studies at the University of Zadar. He wrote thousands of verses, mostly in the traditional decasyllable, and his poems have been published in several books:

- Hrvatskoga težaka kob. O 430. obljetnici seljačke bune M. Gubca
- Vila Hrvatica
- Radovan i Ljudmila
- Duhovna oporuka

== Biography ==
Krešimir Berto Balabanić was born in 1909 in Kolan on the island of Pag, where he spent his entire life working as a farmer and shepherd. He was married to Stoše (born Zubović), with whom he had four children. He died in his birthplace in 1987.

== Work ==
Balabanić began writing poetry very early. He wrote his first poem in 1928, following the assassination of Stjepan Radić. Due to the political circumstances and the interest of the gendarmes in his work, he burned that first poem himself.

After a longer period of reduced activity, in the late 1960s—influenced by the social movements preceding the Croatian Spring—he became more actively engaged in writing again. In 1969 he wrote the poem Naše more (Our Sea) on the occasion of the 900th anniversary of the donation charter of King Peter Krešimir IV.

Balabanić's poetic talent and thousands of written verses fully came to light thanks to later research by historian and archivist Nikola Crnković and Professor Vanda Babić from the Department of Croatian Studies at the University of Zadar.

His works have been compiled and published in several separate books, and his epic poems have also served as inspiration for drama-dance projects.
