= Michael Krešimir II =

King of Croatia

King of Croatia
- Reign: 949–969
- Predecessor: Miroslav
- Successor: Stephen Držislav
- Died: 969
- Burial: Church of St. Mary, Solin
- Spouse: Helen of Zadar
- Issue: Stephen Držislav
- Dynasty: Trpimirović
- Father: Krešimir I
- Religion: Christianity

Michael Krešimir II (Croatian: Mihajlo Krešimir II., Latin: Michael Cresimirus), called the Great, was King of Croatia from 949 until his death in 969. He was a member of the Trpimirović dynasty. Michael Krešimir II was a son of Krešimir I and the younger brother of Miroslav, who preceded him as King of Croatia in 945.

Krešimir was brought to the throne by the powerful Ban Pribina, who rebelled against the former king Miroslav for having his jurisdiction restrained from some areas. The civil war eventually ended with Miroslav's death in 949 and the reign of Mihajlo began, restoring realm's glory.

According to the semi-mythical late 13th century Chronicle of the Priest of Duklja, certain Crescimirus of White Croatia (usually identified with Krešimir II), ravaged the Bosnian župas Uskoplje, Luka and Pliva (anachronism), and eventually conquered the whole region of Bosnia. The Bosnian ban fled to Hungary, after realizing he couldn't fight back and Michael established full control. His son Stjepan (would be actual son Stephen Držislav) succeeded him in ruling of Croatia and Bosnia. Croatian historians like Nada Klaić, Tomislav Raukar and Neven Budak consider that the account has a "historical core", but remains doubtful.

Mihajlo and his wife Helen of Zadar had good relations with, and possibly even ruled over, the Dalmatian cities. He gifted estate of Diklo to the monastery of Church of Saint Chrysogonus, Zadar, as mentioned in the 1066/1067 charter by Peter Krešimir IV (which has chronology of Croatian kings since Cresimiri maioris). Helen built the royal family mausoleum in Salona (in today's Solin) where, at the end of the 19th century, an inscription of her grave was found and translated, bearing her title "Queen".

== See also ==
- List of rulers of Croatia

Regnal titles
Preceded by Miroslav	King of Croatia; 949–969	Succeeded by Stephen Držislav
