= Stephen I of Croatia =

King of Croatia

Stephen I

King of Croatia
- Reign: 1030–1058
- Predecessor: Krešimir III
- Successor: Peter Krešimir IV
- Born: c. 988
- Died: 1058 or 1060
- Burial: Church of St. Stephen, Solin
- Spouse: Hicela Orseolo ?
- Issue: Peter Krešimir IV; Gojslav II
- Dynasty: Trpimirović
- Father: Krešimir III
- Religion: Christianity

Croatian Kingdom c. 1025.

Stephen I (Croatian: Stjepan I.; c. 988 – 1058) was King of Croatia from c. 1030 until his death in 1058 or 1060 and a member of the Krešimirović branch of the so-called Trpimirović dynasty. Stephen I was the first Croatian king whose given name was simply "Stephen" ("Stjepan"), as Držislav added the name Stephen at his coronation. His ban was Stephen Praska.

== Biography ==
=== Background ===
Stephen I was the son of King Krešimir III, but has often been conflated with his like-named cousin, Stephen, the son of Svetoslav Suronja, who had been sent as hostage to the Venetian doge, Pietro II Orseolo, and apparently married the latter's daughter, Hicela Orseolo. Stephen I's son Peter Krešimir IV names Krešimir III as his grandfather, and therefore Stephen I's father.

=== Reign as king ===
Stephen formally succeeded his father Krešimir III in 1030, although it is likely that he co-ruled with him from 1028. The King continued his predecessors' ambitions of spreading rule over the coastal cities and expended much effort in that regard, but it was all eventually in vain.

In 1035, Croatia under Stephen involved itself in the affairs of the neighbouring Holy Roman Empire between the Carinthian count Adalbero and Holy Roman Emperor Conrad II. Aldabero was accused on 18 May 1035 during the Bamberg assembly of conspiring against the emperor with help from the Croats. Because of this, the Emperor strengthened the southeastern part of his state, where it bordered with Croatia. At least temporarily, Stephen took over parts of Carinthia, expanding the jurisdiction of the bishop of Knin to the Drava.

Between 1038 and 1041, Stephen increased his navy, and managed to successfully conquer Zadar from the Venetians for a short period, possibly with the help of the newly crowned Hungarian king Peter Orseolo, his wife's nephew. Stephen controlled the city until 1050, when it was reconquered by doge Domenico I Contarini.

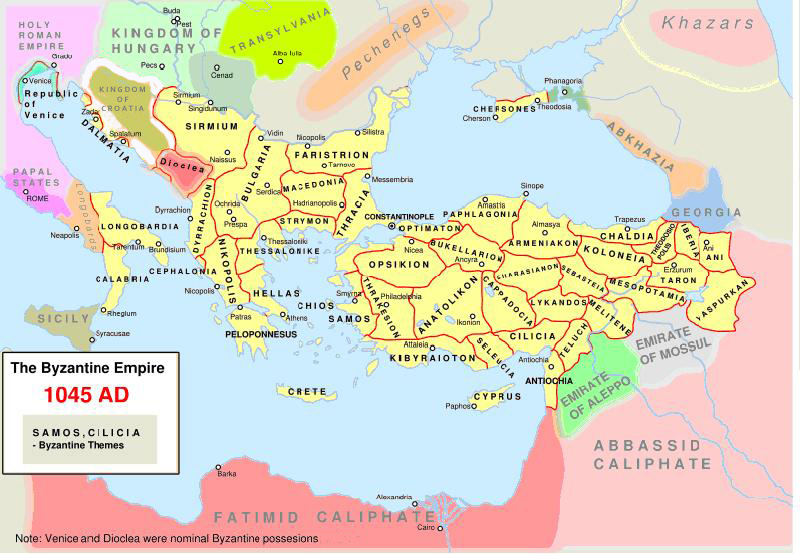
Croatian Kingdom c. 1045, during the reign of king Stephen I of Croatia

In an effort to maintain Roman influence over the Dalmatian cities, the Byzantine emperor granted Stephen Praska, a ban serving under king Stephen I, the title of Protospatharios.

=== Later life and death ===
Stephen I established the diocese of Knin in 1040, which stretched to the north until it met the river Drava. The bishop of Knin had also the nominal title of "Croatian bishop" (Latin: episcopus Chroatensis).

Trade and commerce flourished under Stephen I. A burgeoning aristocracy emerged in Zadar, Biograd, Knin, Split and other coastal cities.

It is traditionally considered that Stephen I ruled until 1058 when his son, Petar Krešimir IV, took over. However, according to historical sources, he ruled until the beginning of the 1060 and had good relationship with papal reforms and even gifting a parrot to Pope Leo IX.

His successors referenced his burial place as the "fields of Elysium" (Elisio campo). In the 1920s, when the Hollow Church was excavated, romantic nationalists interpreted this instead as "fields of Klis" (Clisio campo).

== Family ==
King Stephen I of Croatia married (possibly Hicela Orseolo, but she is generally considered the wife of his cousin Stephen) and had at least two sons and possibly a daughter:

- Peter Krešimir IV of Croatia (? – 1074), King of Croatia from 1058 or 1060.
- Gojslav (elsewhere named Častimir), who fathered Stephen II of Croatia, the last male Trpimirović.
- Cika, sister of Peter Krešimir IV, eventually abbess at Zadar.

== See also ==
- Trpimirović dynasty
- History of Croatia
- List of rulers of Croatia

== Sources ==
- Fine (Jr), John V. A., The Early Medieval Balkans: A Critical Survey from the Sixth to the Late Twelfth Century, Ann Arbor, 1983.
- Kostrenčić, Marko, ed., Codex Diplomaticus Regni Croatiae, Dalmatiae et Slavoniae, vol. 1 (743 to 1100), Zagreb, 1967.
- Šokčević, Dinko, Hrvatska od stoljeća 7. do danas, Zagreb, 2016.
- Royal Croatia

Stephen I of Croatia Trpimirović Dynasty Born: c. 988 Died: 1058/9
Regnal titles
Preceded by Krešimir III of Croatia	King of Croatia; 1030–1058	Succeeded by Peter Krešimir IV
