= Trpimirović dynasty =

Croatian medieval dynasty

Trpimirović
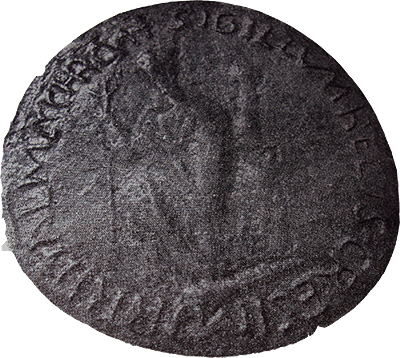
- The seal of King Krešimir, written on it is Sigillum Regis Cresimir Ri Dalmat Chroat
- Country: Duchy of Croatia; Kingdom of Croatia
- Founded: 845; 1181 years ago
- Founder: Trpimir I
- Final ruler: Stephen II
- Titles: King of Croatia; Duke of Croatia; Ban of Slavonia
- Dissolution: 1091
- Cadet branches: Krešimirović; Svetoslavić

The Trpimirović dynasty (Croatian: Trpimirovići) was a native Croatian dynasty that ruled in the Duchy and later the Kingdom of Croatia, with interruptions by the Domagojević dynasty from 845 until 1091. It was named after Trpimir I, the first member and founder. The most prominent rulers of the Trpimirović Dynasty include Tomislav (first king of Croatia), Petar Krešimir IV and Demetrius Zvonimir. The house gave four dukes, thirteen kings and a queen.

== History ==
Since its mid-9th century foundation, the house reached independent rule at some later point and dissolved at the end of the 11th century. During that time, the state had slight territorial changes, most notably in Bosnia and southern Dalmatia, where the wars against Venetians and others were waged.

== Dukes and Kings of Croatia ==
The Trpimirović dynasty was a ruling dynasty of Croatia from the 9th to the 11th century. The ruling estate (Latin: terra regalis) of the Trpimirović dynasty was located in the area between Trogir and Split (today Kaštela, Solin area and Klis from where they ruled), and Split and Omiš and later in other parts of the land. After the death of Duke Trpimir I, the power was temporarily assumed by Domagoj, a member of the assumed Domagojević dynasty. In 878, Trpimir I's son Zdeslav overthrew Domagoj, but he was overthrown by Branimir and then around 892, Zdeslav's brother Muncimir became duke, restoring the dynasty to power.

The rulers of the dynasty initially ruled as vassals of the Franks. They fought with the Venetian Republic and Byzantine Empire for control of the coast, and at the end of the 9th century achieved greater autonomy. In the first half of the 10th century, the first King of Croatia, Tomislav united Lower Pannonia ("Pannonian Croatia") and Dalmatian Croatia and created the Kingdom of Croatia. According to scarce and disputed historical sources, Croatia was a powerful state under his rule. King Tomislav maintained an alliance with the pope and successfully defended Croatia from the invading Hungarians, while at the local level he participated at the Church Councils of Split in 925 and 928. The struggle with the Byzantines and the Venetians over Dalmatian coastal cities continued after his death.

Tomislav's successors failed to maintain a stable kingship and the country was affected by a dynastic crisis in the middle of the 10th century. Even Pribina, the Croatian ban (viceroy), got involved in the dispute between brothers Miroslav and Michael Krešimir II. Pribina took the side of Michael Krešimir which resulted in the murder of King Miroslav in 949. Political and social recovery of Croatia occurred during the reign of Michael Krešimir II and his son King Stephen Držislav. Split chronicler Thomas the Archdeacon (1200–1268) wrote that Stephen Držislav had received royal honours and that since then, Croatian rulers were verifiably referred to as the "Kings of Dalmatia and Croatia".

After the death of King Stephen Držislav in 997, he was succeeded by three sons: Svetoslav Suronja, Krešimir III and Gojslav. The two younger brothers rebelled against Svetoslav Suronja, which started a new dynastic conflict that ended with the dethroning of Svetoslav. On thus the rulership was jointly taken over by Krešimir III and Gojslav. From Svetoslav and his offspring the Svetoslavić branch was created. The descendants of Krešimir III were part of the Krešimirović branch that continued to rule Croatia.

The dynasty reached its peak during the reign of King Petar Krešimir IV, who consolidated and expanded the kingdom. The dynasty ended in 1091 with the death of Petar Krešimir IV's nephew Stephen II, the successor to King Demetrius Zvonimir who did not leave a male heir.

== Chronology ==
As stated in the Croatian Encyclopedia, "due to the lack of sources, some genealogical questions related to the dynasty cannot be definitively resolved, nor can the exact years of the reign be determined for most of the rulers". The common chronology of the dukes and kings of Croatia was conceptualized by Franjo Rački and Ferdo Šišić, but although generally accepted, has several controversial claims about the 9th and 10th century line of the Trpimirović dynasty. In their interpretation of the De Administrando Imperio (which is mentioning in chronological order prince Terpimer father of Krasimer, prince Krasimer father of Miroslav who was killed by ban Pribina) the rulers, including Trpimir known from other sources as ruling cca. 845–864, have actually ruled in the first part of the 10th century and invented Trpimir II whose not mentioned in historical sources. Due to such discrepancies and historiographical inventions, there were proposed revised chronologies.

== Rulers ==
=== Dukes of Croatia ===
- Trpimir I (845–864)
- Zdeslav (878–879)
- Muncimir (892–910)
- Tomislav (910–925)

=== Kings of Croatia ===
- Tomislav (925–928)
- Trpimir II (928–935)
- Krešimir I (935–945)
- Miroslav (945–949)
- Michael Krešimir II (949–969)
- Stephen Držislav (969–997)
- Svetoslav Suronja (997–1000)
- Krešimir III (1000–c. 1030)
- Gojslav (1000–c. 1020)
- Stephen I (c. 1030–1058)
- Peter Krešimir IV (1058–1074)
- Demetrius Zvonimir (1075–1089)
- Stephen II (1089–1091)

== See also ==
- List of rulers of Croatia
- History of Croatia
- House of Domagojević
- Trpimirović Royal Family Tree
