= Krešimir III =

King of Croatia

King of Croatia
- Reign: 1000–1030
- Predecessor: Svetoslav Suronja
- Successor: Stephen I
- Died: 1030
- Burial: Church of St. Stephen, Solin
- Issue: Stephen I of Croatia
- Dynasty: Trpimirović
- Father: Stjepan Držislav
- Religion: Christianity

Krešimir III (Latin: Cresimir) was King of Croatia from 1000 until his death in 1030. He was from the Trpimirović dynasty and founder of the Krešimirović branch of the family. He was the middle son of former King Stjepan Držislav. Until 1020, he co-ruled with his brother Gojslav.

== Biography ==
=== Reign ===
Croatian Kingdom c. 1025.

After Croatia's King Stjepan Držislav died in 997, his son Svetoslav Suronja became King of Croatia, apparently sidelining his brothers, Gojslav and Krešimir, who opposed him, resulting in civil war. Svetoslav's brothers may have used his alliance with the Byzantine Empire to obtain help from Bulgaria. The Bulgarian monarch Samuil pillaged the Dalmatian cities as far north as Zadar, as well as parts of Bosnia on his return. During the last two years (999–1000) of the Croatian civil war, the rebels, probably with some Bulgarian help, had managed to depose Svetoslav Suronja, who allied himself with the Venetian Doge Pietro II Orseolo in 1000. The Doge then began a successful campaign in Dalmatia.

In Trogir, which was brought under Venetian control, the Doge and the deposed king reached an agreement in which Svetoslav's son Stephen was to be taken hostage and marry the Doge's daughter, Hicela Orseolo. This Stephen has been sometimes confused with Krešimir III's son and successor Stephen I. At that point, all the Dalmatian rulers submitted to the Doge "except for the King of the Croats".

Around 1015, Krešimir was given the honorary title of patrician from the Byzantines, possibly as a token of gratitude for his policy in the Balkans.

The war between Venice and Croatia was renewed in Summer 1018, when Krešimir launched a campaign against the Dalmatian cities in an attempt to retake the lost territories. The cities requested help from Otto Orseolo, who intervened on the eastern coast of the Adriatic Sea and managed to successfully repel these incursions from Croatia. According to surviving legal documents, the islands Krk and Rab, previously under Croatian control, repledged their allegiance to Venice and promised to pay an annual tribute.

Krešimir III and his brother Gojslav spent their reign attempting to restore control over the Dalmatian cities that were now under Venetian rule. After describing the defeat and absorption of the First Bulgarian Empire by Emperor Basil II, John Skylitzes records that certain Croats "who had two brothers as their rulers", after approaching Basil, subjected themselves to him, after which the tribes did as well. The later chronicler Cedrenus makes a similar record, but implies instead that the two brothers subjected themselves to him in person.

=== Later years ===
Around spring 1024, Basil Boioannes, Byzantine general and governor of the Catapanate of Italy, sailed across the Adriatic from Bari and invaded Croatia. In subsequent clashes, he captured Krešimir's wife and son, who were first taken to Bari, and then to Constantinople as hostages. Although Croatia and Boioannes possibly harbored ill will towards each other, this clash does not necessarily prove that Constantinople itself had poor relations with Croatia.

After the death of Emperor Basil II in 1025, Krešimir stopped paying tribute to the empire. Around 1027, he collaborated with Stephen I of Hungary against Venice in an attempt to regain the cities of Dalmatia. The Hungarian king previously took his nephew Peter Urseolo, who was forced to flee from the republic when his father was deposed in a 1026 revolt. It is also assumed by one chronicle that Krešimir took part in the 1030 war against the Holy Roman Emperor Conrad on the Hungarian side, though this is not corroborated in any other source. Stephen I also might have betrothed his son, Emeric, to one of Krešimir's daughters, but records show that the preparations were cancelled due to Emeric's sudden death.

Krešimir III was succeeded by his son Stephen around 1030, who should not be confused with Krešimir's nephew, also named Stephen, the son of Svetoslav, who had moved from Venice to Hungary in c. 1024 and was subsequently able to assert himself in Slavonia.

== See also ==
- Croatian-Bulgarian Wars
- Trpimirović dynasty
- History of Croatia
- List of rulers of Croatia

== Literature ==
- Ferdo Šišić, Povijest Hrvata u vrijeme narodnih vladara, Zagreb, 1925 ISBN 86-401-0080-2
- Fine (Jr), John V. A., The Early Medieval Balkans: A Critical Survey from the Sixth to the Late Twelfth Century, Ann Arbor: University of Michigan Press, 1983.
- Fine (Jr), John V. A., When Ethnicity Did Not Matter in the Balkans: A Study of Identity in Pre-Nationalist Croatia, Dalmatia, and Slavonia in the Medieval and Early-Modern Periods, Ann Arbor: University of Michigan Press, 2006.
- Mladen Švab, Prilog kritici "kronologije" dijela pripisivanog arhiđakonu goričkomu Ivanu, Historijski zbornik, god. XXXVI pp. 119–160
- Živković, Tibor (ed.), Gesta Regum Sclavorum, vol. 1, Belgrade, 2009.

== Footnotes ==
Krešimir III Trpimirović Dynasty Died: c. 1030
Regnal titles
Preceded by Svetoslav Suronja	King of Croatia; 1000–1030; With: Gojislav	Succeeded by Stephen I
