= Peter Krešimir IV =

King of Croatia and Dalmatia from 1058 to 1074

Petar Krešimir IV
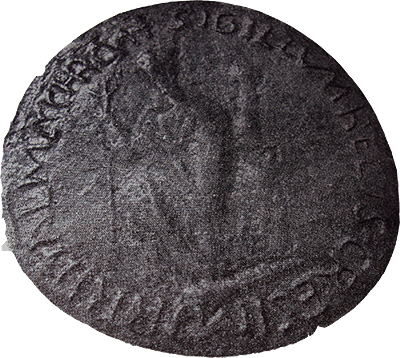
- Krešimir IV's effigy on a seal

King of Croatia and Dalmatia
- Reign: 1058–1074
- Coronation: 1059
- Predecessor: Stephen I
- Successor: Demetrius Zvonimir
- Died: 1074
- Burial: Church of St. Stephen, Solin
- Dynasty: Trpimirović
- Father: Stephen I
- Mother: Hicela Orseolo
- Religion: Catholicism

Peter Krešimir IV (Croatian: Petar Krešimir IV.) was King of Croatia and Dalmatia from 1058 until his death in 1074. He was the last ruler of the Krešimirović branch of the Trpimirović dynasty.

Under Peter Krešimir IV, the Croatian realm reached its peak territorially. He kept his seat at Nin and Biograd na Moru; however, the city of Šibenik holds a statue of him and is sometimes called "Krešimir's city" (Croatian: "Krešimirov grad") because he is generally credited as the founder.

== Biography ==
=== Early years ===
Peter Krešimir was born as one of two children to king Stephen I (Stjepan I) and his wife Hicela, daughter of the Venetian Doge Pietro II Orseolo. Krešimir succeeded his father Stephen I upon his death in 1058 and was crowned the next year. It is not known where his coronation took place, but some historians suggest Biograd as a possibility.

From the outset, he continued the policies of his father, and was immediately requested in letter by Pope Nicholas II first in 1059 and then in 1060 to further reform the Croatian church in accordance with the Roman rite. This was especially significant to the papacy in the aftermath of the Great Schism of 1054, when a papal ally in the Balkans was a necessity. Upon a visit of the papal legate Mainardius in 1060, at Church sabor in Split in 1061, Krešimir and the upper nobility lent their support to the pope and the church of Rome. To his time period, and possibly rulership over Bosnia as well, dates the foundation of the Roman Catholic Diocese of Bosnia (somewhere between 1060 and 1074).

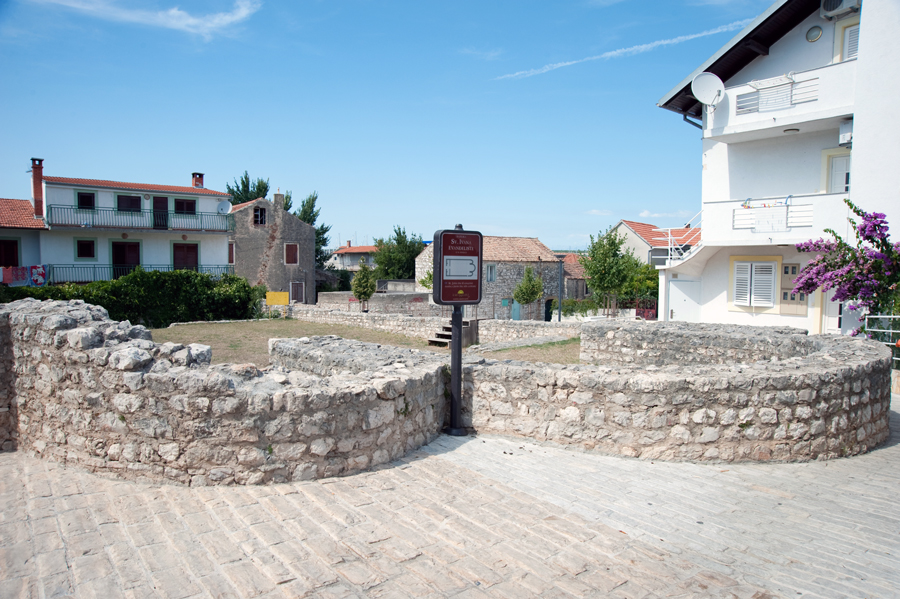
Ruins of Monastery of Saint John the Evangelist in Biograd na Moru.

Church conclusions were made also against the Croatian Glagolitic priesthood and other having long beards and hair style, marriages, and that the secular government does not interfere in the affairs of the church, in aim to distance them from Byzantine orientalism. More so, the ecclesiastical service was likely practiced in the native Slavonic (Glagolitic), whereas the pope demanded practice in Latin. This caused a rebellion of the clergy led by a bishop of Krk Cededa and a certain priest named Vuk (Ulfus), who had presented the demands and gifts of the Croats to the Pope during his stay in Rome, but was told nothing could be accomplished without the consent of the Split see and the king. They protested against celibacy and the Roman Rite in 1063, but they were proclaimed heretical at a synod of 1064 and excommunicated, a decision which Krešimir supported. Krešimir harshly quelled all opposition and sustained a firm alignment towards western Romanism, with the intent of more fully integrating the Dalmatian populace into his realm.

In turn, he could then use them to balance the power caused by the growing feudal class. By the end of Krešimir's reign, feudalism had made permanent inroads into Croatian society and Dalmatia had been permanently associated with the Croatian state, and the last Byzantine protospatharios and katepano of Dalmatia, named Leo, is mentioned in 1067 and 1069.

The income from the cities further strengthened Krešimir's power, and he subsequently fostered the development of more cities, such as Biograd, Nin, Šibenik, Karin, and Skradin. He also had several monasteries constructed, like the Benedictine monasteries of St John the Evangelist (1060) and St Thomas (c. 1066) in Biograd, and donated much land to the Church. In 1066, he granted a charter to the new monastery of St. Mary in Zadar, where the founder and first nun was his cousin, the abbess Čika. This remains the oldest Croatian monument in the city of Zadar, and became a spearhead for the reform movement. During the same year, he gave his nephew Stephen Trpimirović the office of Duke of Croatia, which designated him as his co-ruler and successor.

In 1067, the northern part of the kingdom was invaded by Ulric I, Margrave of Carniola, who occupied a part of Kvarner and the eastern coast of Istria, the "March of Dalmatia". As the king was at that time preoccupied with the liturgical issues and reforms in Dalmatia, these parts were eventually liberated by his ban Demetrius Zvonimir.

=== Territorial policy ===
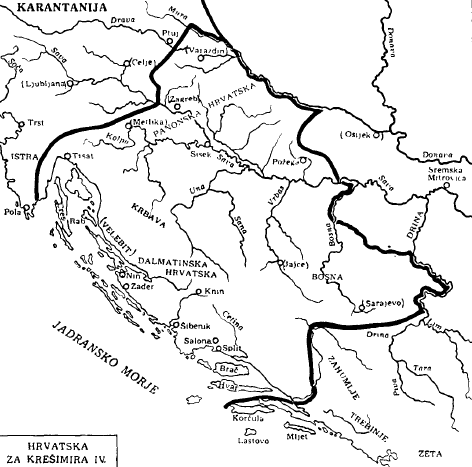
Approximate borders of the Croatian Kingdom during the reign of king Petar Krešimir IV

It was during his rule that, for the first time, the high-ranking office of ban started to branch, as multiple bans were first mentioned in 1067. Older generation of historians like Ferdo Šišić and Miho Barada assumed, apart from the ban of Croatia, that the banate of Slavonia existed during this period, and that was held by Krešimir's successor Demetrius Zvonimir. However, other historians like Nada Klaić and Neven Budak reject or doubt such a thesis because there is lack of historical evidence.

The city of Šibenik is for the first time mentioned during his rule in 1066, which was his seat for some time and is for these reasons referred to as "Krešimir's city" in modern times. In 1069, he gave the island of Maun, near Nin, to the monastery of St. Krševan in Zadar, in thanks for the "expansion of the kingdom on land and on sea, by the grace of the omnipotent God" (quia Deus omnipotens terra marique nostrum prolungavit regnum). In his surviving document, Krešimir nevertheless did not fail to point out that it was "our own island that lies on our Dalmatian sea" (nostram propriam insulam in nostro Dalmatico mari sitam, que vocatur Mauni).

Around 1070, Krešimir was rumored to have previously murdered his brother Gojslav (some historians identify with Gojčo, Ban of Croatia who served until 1069). Eventually, when the rumors reached abroad, Pope Alexander II sent one of his legates, Mainardius, to inquire about the death of Gojslav. Only after the monarch and 12 Croatian župans had taken an oath that he did not kill his brother, the Pope symbolically restored the royal power to Krešimir. According to Neven Budak, these events happened at the very beginning of Krešimir's reign because was titled only as princeps and it happened before Mainardius calling of Church sabor in 1060. Krešimir in turn made Demetrius Zvonimir the new Ban of Croatia, and subsequently elevated him as his principal adviser with the title Duke of Croatia.

=== Relations with Byzantium and the Normans ===
In 1069, he had the Byzantine Empire recognize him as supreme ruler of the Theme of Dalmatia, which Byzantium had controlled since the Croatian dynastic struggle of 997. At the time, the Byzantine empire was at war both with the Seljuk Turks in Asia and the Normans in southern Italy, so Krešimir took the opportunity and, avoiding an imperial nomination as proconsul or eparch, consolidated his holdings as the regnum Dalmatiae et Chroatia. This was not a formal title, but it designated a unified political-administrative territory, which had been the chief desire of the Croatian kings.

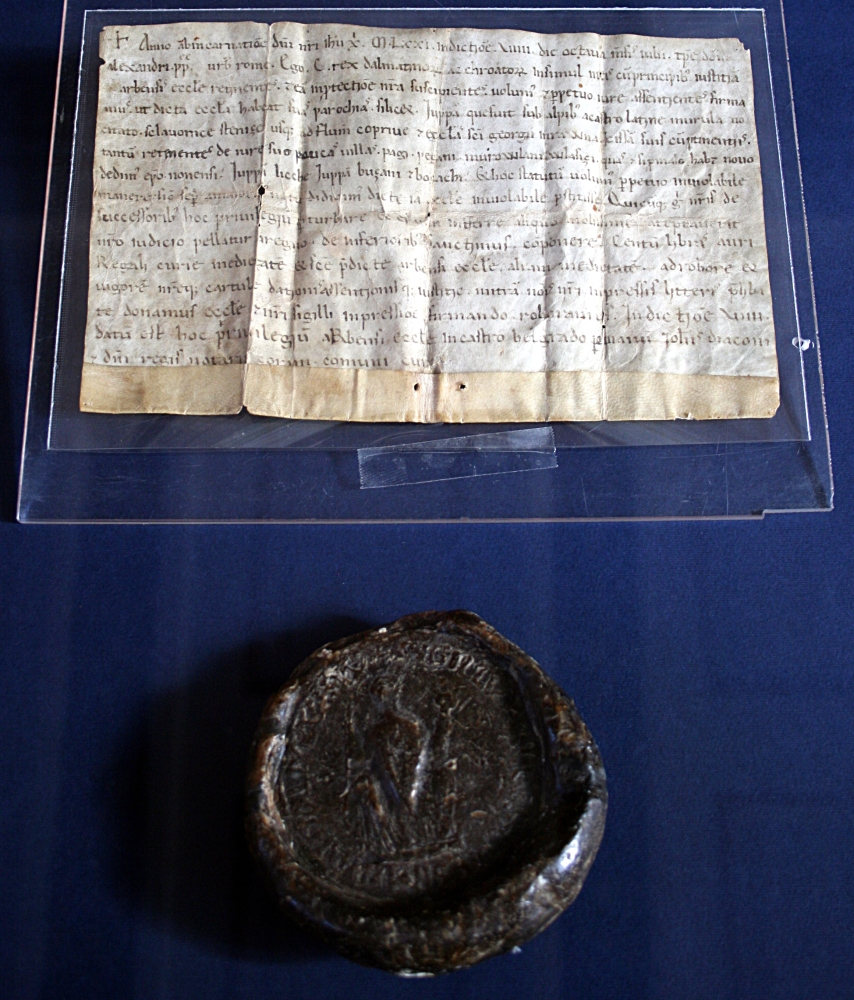
Peter Krešimir IV's confirmation of donating land parcels to the diocese of Rab.

In the meantime, the Normans from southern Italy became involved in Balkan politics and Krešimir soon came in contact with them. After the 1071 Battle of Manzikert, where the Seljuk Turks routed the Eastern Imperial army, the Diocleans, Serbs and other Slavs instigated the Bulgarian uprising of Georgi Voyteh against the Byzantium, and in 1072 Krešimir is alleged to have lent his aid to this uprising. However in 1074, at the invitation of the Dalmatian coastal cities and Byzantium, the Normans invaded the Dalmatian possessions of Croatia from southern Italy, ruling since 19 March the towns of Split, Trogir, Biograd na Moru and Zadar for almost a year. During the invasion, the Norman count Amico of Giovinazzo, who was in Byzantine service and Byzantines instigated the attack on Krešimir because he abandoned emperor's sovereignty, also besieged the island of Rab for almost a month (14 April to early May). The siege failed, but he managed to take the island of Cres on 9 May. It was during these clashes that the Croatian king himself was captured by Amico at an unidentified location. The capture was mentioned on Church Sabor of Split in November 1074, which is the last time King Petar Krešimir's name was mentioned. In February 1075, the Republic of Venice expelled the Normans and assumed control of the Dalmatian cities for themselves.

=== Death and succession ===
Near the end of his reign, having no sons, Peter Krešimir designated Demetrius Zvonimir as his heir. It seems that Petar Krešimir died in a Norman prison by November 1074 because on 25 January 1075 was sent a letter by Pope Gregory VII to Sweyn II of Denmark in search of a candidate for a new ruler of, to the Pope, nearby "rich land by the sea which became mastered by vulgar and cowardly heretics", meaning Croatia and Amico's Normans. The help from Danish king wasn't needed as Venice soon expelled the Normans and was the coronation of Zvonimir who pledged loyalty to the Holy See.

Krešimir was buried in the church of St. Stephen in Salona (today's Solin) which served as the Mausoleum of Croatian Kings. Several centuries later the Ottoman Turks destroyed the church, banished the monks who had preserved it, and destroyed the graves.

== Legacy ==
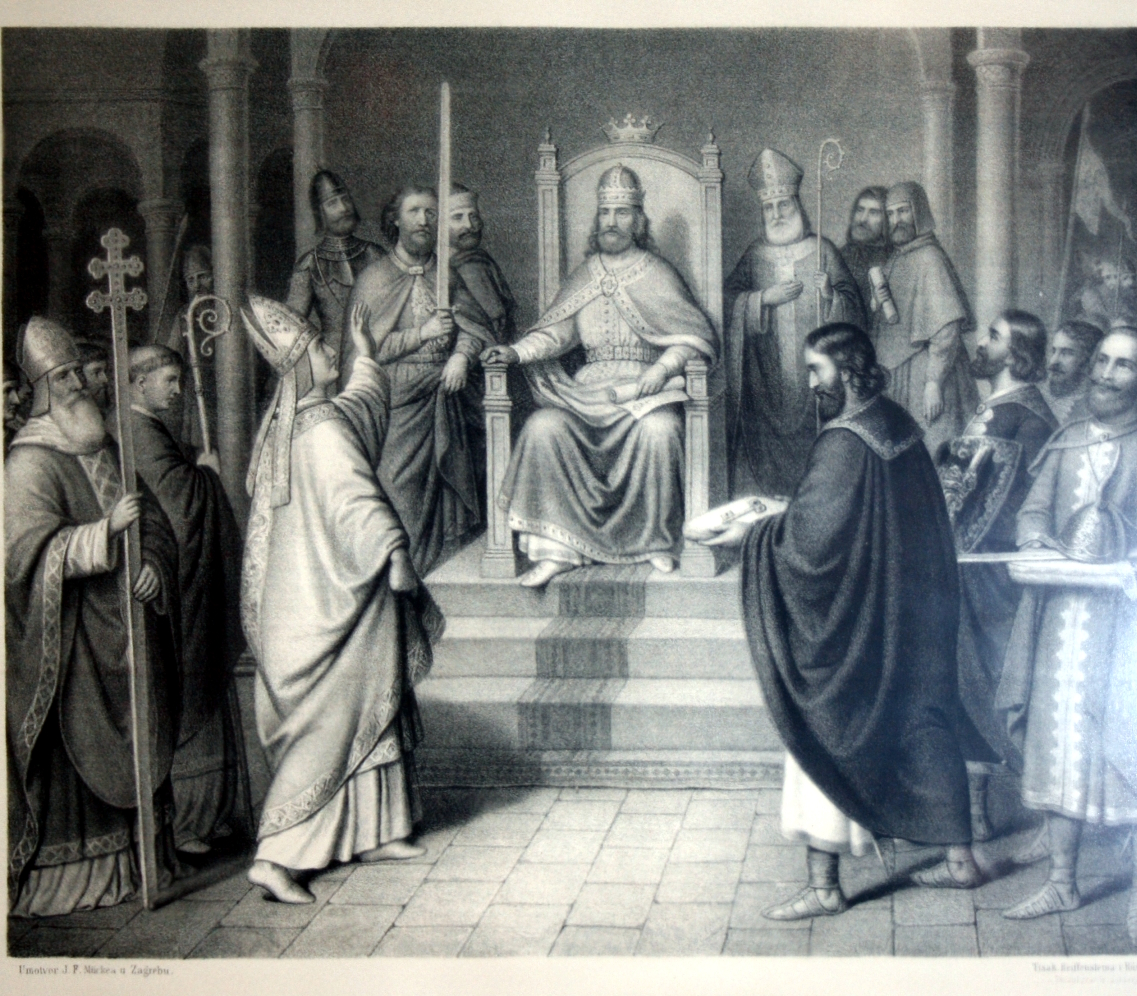
Engraving by J.F. Mücke, Reiffenstein & Röch, 1868

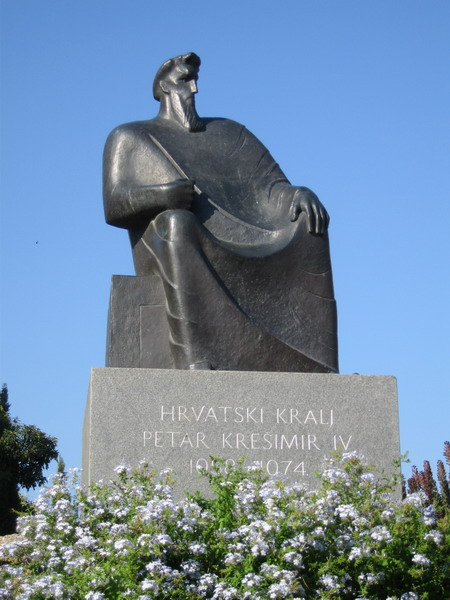
Statue of Krešimir in Šibenik, 2000

Krešimir is, by some historians, regarded as one of the greatest Croatian rulers. The RTOP-11 of the Croatian navy was named after Krešimir. The city of Šibenik holds a statue of him and some schools in the vicinity are named after Krešimir.

== Literature ==
- Budak, Neven (2018). Hrvatska povijest od 550. do 1100 [Croatian history from 550 until 1100]. Leykam international. ISBN 978-953-340-061-7. Archived from the original on 2022-10-03.
- Ferdo Šišić, Povijest Hrvata u vrijeme narodnih vladara, 1925, Zagreb ISBN 86-401-0080-2

Peter Krešimir IV Trpimirović Dynasty Died: 1074
Regnal titles
Preceded by Stephen I	King of Croatia; 1058–1074	Succeeded by Demetrius Zvonimir
