= Stephen Držislav =

King of Croatia from 969 to c. 997

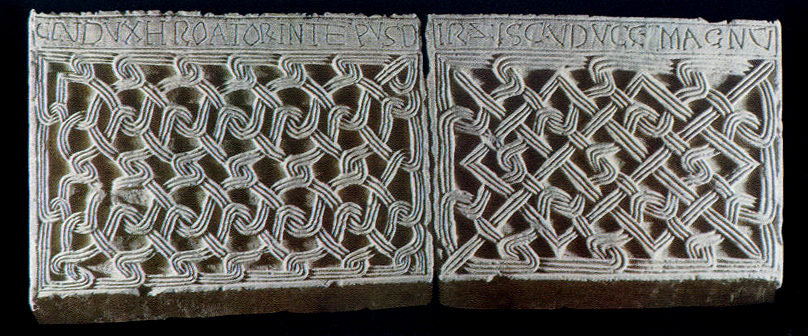
- The pleter with inscription of Stephen Držislav, 10th century.

King of Croatia
- Reign: 969–997
- Predecessor: Michael Krešimir II
- Successor: Svetoslav Suronja
- Regent: Helen of Zadar (969–976)
- Died: c. 997
- Burial: Church of St. Stephen, Solin
- Issue: Svetoslav; Krešimir III; Gojslav
- Dynasty: Trpimirović
- Father: Michael Krešimir II
- Mother: Helen of Zadar
- Religion: Christianity

Stephen Držislav (Croatian: Stjepan Držislav, Latin: Dircislauus, Dirscisclavus, Dirzisclavus, Dirzsci[s]clavus, Dirzislaus, Stefanus) was King of Croatia from AD 969 until his death around 997. He was a member of the Trpimirović dynasty, and in preserved documents and inscriptions held titles of reges (king), dux magnus, patriarch and eparchi.

== Biography ==
=== Rule ===
Stephen Držislav was a son of king Michael Krešimir II and Queen Helen of Zadar. His church name Stephen (Stefani regis) is mentioned on the epitaph of the Helen's sarcophagus with date 976. Helen acted as regent for the young king from 969 until her death on 8 October 976. As in the inscription his named as "Stephen (honorific)" he probably already by 976 received royal insignia.

During Byzantine emperor Basil II's war against Tsar Samuil of Bulgaria who in his conquest became neighbor of Croatia, Stephen Držislav actively allied with the Byzantines. After Basil managed to defend every single Adriatic coastal city during Samuil's rampage towards Zadar in 986, the cities were returned to Croatian control. According to Thomas the Archdeacon, Stephen Držislav received royal insignia and the titles as an act of recognition from the Byzantine Emperor, becoming reges Dalmatie et Chroatie with titles of patritii and eparchi, which gave him formal authority over the Theme of Dalmatia (but some historians believe not over the Dalmatian city-states), and his descendants having the same titles. Since his period, the official title of Croatian kings changed from gentile (king of Croats) to territorial (king of Croatia and Dalmatia).

The 13th-century work Historia Salonitana by Thomas the Archdeacon notes that Zachlumia (or Chulmie) was a part of the Kingdom of Croatia, before and after Stephen Držislav. The late 13th-century Chronicle of the Priest of Duklja states that certain Stjepan (son of Croatian ruler Krešimir, identified with Michael Krešimir II) ruled over Croatia and Bosnia.

During his rule Godemir was Ban of Croatia.

Stone panels from the altar of a 10th-century church in Knin, reveal the following inscription in Latin: [SVETOS]CLV DUX HROATOR[UM] IN TE[M]PUS D IRZISCLV DUCE[M] MAGNU[M] (in English, Svetoslav, Duke of the Croats at the time of Drzislav the Great Duke). As written, before the end of his reign, Stephen Držislav as Latin: dux magnus gave Svetoslav, his oldest son, the title of dux Hroatorum and Svetoslav became his co-ruler. The title of dux magnus had the meaning of rex (king). The stone panels are kept at the Museum of Croatian Archaeological Monuments in Split.

In 996, Venetian Doge Pietro II Orseolo stopped paying tax for safe passage to the Croatian King after a century of peace, renewing old hostilities. Stephen Držislav, together with the Neretvians, possibly fought the Venetian fleet led by Badorai Bragadin at Vis, but with little success. Some historians argue that the Venetians attacked in that year because Držislav already died hence dating his death to 996 instead of 997.

Držislav's rule was one of the longest of Kings in Croatia, spanning nearly three decades. In addition to Svetoslav, he had two other sons, Krešimir, and Gojslav, and all three of them were to hold the title of King of Croatia over the following decades.

=== Croatian checkerboard legend ===
According to a legend and folk tradition, it is said that he was captured by the Venetians and played a chess match against Doge Pietro II Orseolo. He won all 3 matches and gained freedom, later incorporating the red checkerboard into the Croatian coat of arms.

== Inscription ==
In 1892, Lujo Marun documented how a stone slab was found in Kapitul near Knin that contained an epigraph of Držislav together with the Croatian interlace.

== See also ==
- History of Croatia
- List of rulers of Croatia

Stephen Držislav Trpimirović Dynasty Died: 997
Regnal titles
Preceded by Mihajlo Krešimir II	King of Croatia; 969–997	Succeeded by Svetoslav Suronja
