= Dalmatian city-states =

Romance-populated city-states in Dalmatia

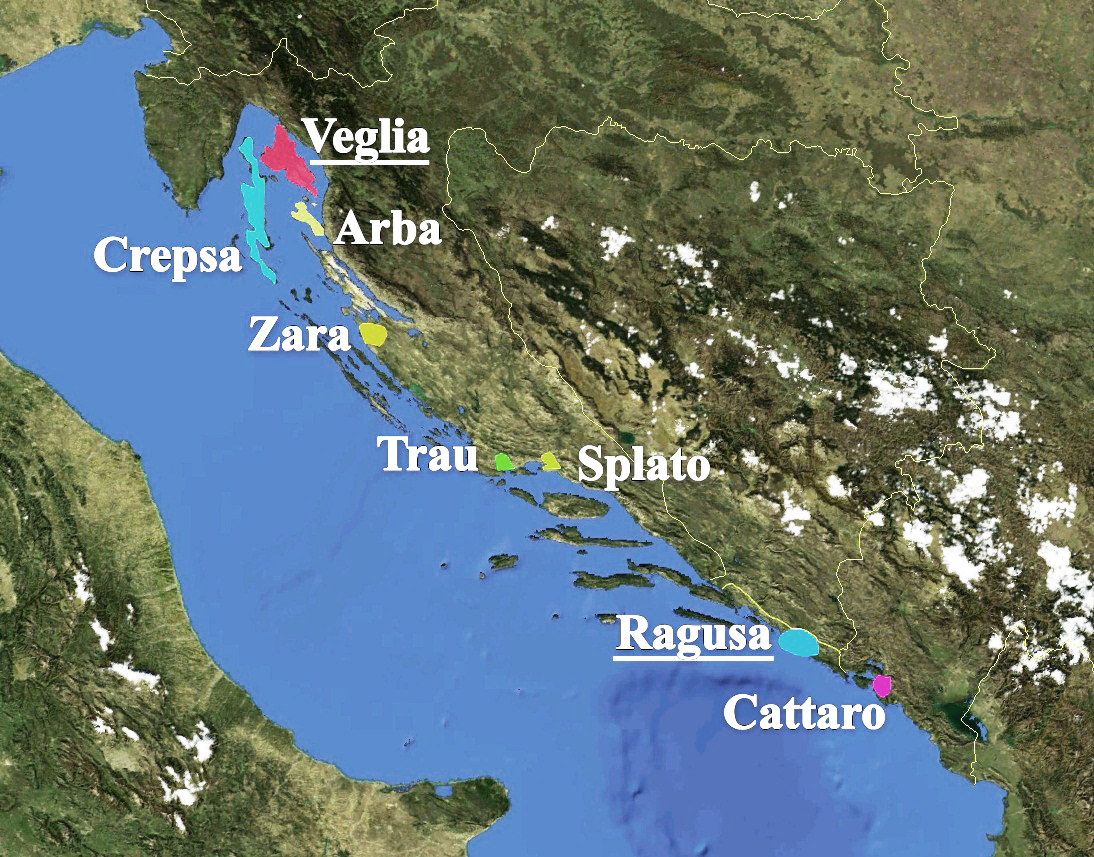
Areas of the Dalmatian city-states with their respective dialects, showing Veglia for the "Vegliot" and Ragusa for the "Ragusan"

Dalmatian city-states were formerly Roman municipalities in Dalmatia where the local Romance population survived the Barbarian invasions after the fall of the Western Roman Empire in the 400s AD. Eight little cities were created by the indigenous Illyro-Roman inhabitants of the region, who maintained political links with the Eastern Roman Empire, which in return defended these cities, enabling their commercial trade with Byzantium.

The original names of these city-states were Arba, Cattarum, Crespa, Jadera, Ragusium, Spalatum, Tragurium, and Vecla. The language and the laws were initially Latin, but after a few centuries, they developed their own vulgar Latin language, Dalmatian, which survived into the 19th century. The cities were maritime centers with important commerce links, mainly with the Italian Peninsula and with the rising Republic of Venice.

== History ==
Dalmatia was inhabited by autochthonous Illyrian tribe Dalmatae since the Iron Age. The Roman–Dalmatae Wars lasted until 33 BC when Octavian installed Roman hegemony in Dalmatia. The defeat of the Great Illyrian Revolt began the integration of Dalmatia which in turn led to the Romanization of the region by the early Middle Ages. Dalmatian language evolved from the vulgar Latin of the Illyro-Romans. After the fall of the Western Roman Empire, Dalmatia consisted of a group of coastal cities functioning much like city-states, with extensive autonomy, but without control of the rural hinterland controlled by the Slavic tribes who arrived after 640 AD. These city-states were characterized by common Latin laws, Catholic religion, language, commerce, and political and administrative structures.

The eight city-states were:

- Jadera (now called in Italian: Zara; Croatian: Zadar) – Originally a small island in the central Dalmatia coast
- Spalatum (Italian: Spalato; Croatian: Split) – Initially created inside the Diocletian Palace
- Crespa (Italian: Cherso; Croatian: Cres) – On an island in northern Dalmatia
- Arba, (Italian: Arbe; Croatian: Rab) – On a small island in front of the northern Velebit mountains
- Tragurium (Italian: Trau; Croatian: Trogir) – On a small island not far away from Roman Salona
- Vecla (Italian: Veglia; Croatian: Krk) – On an island near the northern Dalmatia coast
- Ragusium (Italian: Ragusa; Croatian: Dubrovnik) – Originally a promontory in southern Dalmatia
- Cattarum (Italian: Cattaro; Serbo-Croatian: Kotor) – Inside the Bay of Kotor, today in Montenegro

Later were added other cities in north-central Dalmatia, like Sebenicum (now Šibenik), Flumen (now Rijeka), and Pagus (now Pag). According to Kingsley Garland Jayne:

The great Slavonic migration into Illyria, which wrought a complete change in the fortunes of Dalmatia, took place in the first half of the 7th century. In other parts of the Balkan Peninsula these invaders—Serbs, Croats or Bulgars—found little difficulty in expelling or absorbing the native population. But here they were baffled when confronted by the powerful maritime city-states, highly civilized, and able to rely on the moral if not the material support of their kinsfolk in Italy. Consequently, while the country districts were settled by the Slavs, the Latin or Italian population flocked for safety to Ragusa, Zara and other large towns, and the whole country was thus divided between two frequently hostile communities. This opposition was intensified by the schism between Eastern and Western Christianity (1054), the Slavs as a rule preferring the Orthodox or sometimes the Bogomil creed, while the Italians were firmly attached to the Papacy. Not until the 15th century did the rival races contribute to a common civilization in the literature of Ragusa. To such a division of population may be attributed the two dominant characteristics of local history—the total absence of national as distinguished from civic life, and the remarkable development of art, science and literature. Bosnia, Servia and Bulgaria had each its period of national greatness, but remained intellectually backward; Dalmatia failed ever to attain political or racial unity, but the Dalmatian city-states, isolated and compelled to look to Italy for support, shared perforce in the march of Italian civilization. Their geographical position suffices to explain the relatively small influence exercised by Byzantine culture throughout the six centuries (535–1102) during which Dalmatia was part of the Eastern empire. Towards the close of this period Byzantine rule tended more and more to become merely nominal.

In the Early Medieval period, Byzantine Dalmatia was ravaged by an Avar-Slavic invasion (more specifically the Croats per Thomas the Archdeacon) that destroyed its capital, Salona, in 639 AD. This event allowed for the settlement of the nearby Diocletian's Palace in Spalatum by Salonitans, greatly increasing the importance of the city, followed by South Slavic settlement in the hinterland.

The Slavs, loosely allied with the Avars, permanently settled the region in the first half of the 7th century AD and remained its predominant ethnic group ever since. The Croats soon formed their own realm: the Principality of Dalmatian Croatia which in 925 became Kingdom of Croatia. The meaning of the geographical term "Dalmatia" now shrunk to the cities and their immediate hinterland. These cities and towns remained influential as they were well-fortified and maintained their connection with the Byzantine Empire. Since the time of duke Branimir of Croatia, Venetians had to pay taxes to Croatia and to the Narentines for their ships traveling along the eastern Adriatic coast, while the Dalmatian city-states paid 710 ducats of tribute to the Croatian ruler.

The two communities were somewhat hostile at first, but as the Croats became Christianized, this tension gradually subsided. A degree of cultural mingling soon took place, in some enclaves stronger, in others weaker, as Slavic influence and culture were more accentuated in Ragusium and Cattarum while the influence from the Italian peninsula was stronger in the northern Dalmatia islands and in Jadera and Spalatum. According to the analysis of the anthroponyms of the Dalmatian city-states Split and Trogir in the 11th century, it is estimated that 25% of upper class and 50% of citizens of Split had Slavic/Slavicized names, while both in Trogir were predominantly Slavic/Slavicized. In 1177, Pope Alexander III was welcomed by the citizens of Zadar "with endless songs and chants of praise ringing about him in their Slavonic tongue". By the 13th century, 64% of names in Zadar had Slavic origin.

Around 950 AD, as the Dalmatian city-states gradually lost all protection by Byzantium, being unable to unite in a defensive league hindered by their internal dissensions, they had to turn to Venice for support. Each of the Dalmatian city-states needed protection (even from piracy), based mostly on economic reasons. In the year 1000 AD, an expedition of Venetian ships in coastal Istria and Dalmatia secured the Venetian suzerainty in the area, and the Narentines (Slav) pirates were suppressed permanently. On the occasion, Doge Orseolo named himself "Duke of Dalmatia", starting the colonial Empire of Venice. Croatia again had a period of control over the theme and Dalmatian city-states under Peter Krešimir IV by 1069, but during the 1074 invasion of the Normans he died in February 1075 the Venetians banished the Normans and secured the Dalmatian cities for themselves. The doge Domenico Selvo self-titled himself as the doge of "Venice, Dalmatia and Croatia" (later only of "Dalmatia"), but did not have nominal power over Dalmatia and Croatia. In October 1075 was crowned Demetrius Zvonimir as the king of "Croatia and Dalmatia" by the Holy See and his power was felt even on the island of Krk and Cres. His death in 1089 caused succession crisis in Croatia and Dalmatia, but although doge Vitale I Michiel made with Coloman, King of Hungary agreement of 1098—the so-called Conventio Amicitiae—determined the spheres of interest of each party by allotting the coastal regions of Croatia to Hungary and Dalmatia to the Republic of Venice, Coloman in 1105 successfully conquered coastal cities of Dalmatia.

The Venetians, to whom the Dalmatians were already bound by language and culture, could afford to concede liberal terms as its main goal was to prevent the development of any dangerous political or commercial competitor on the eastern Adriatic. The seafaring community in Dalmatia looked to Venice as the new "queen" of the Adriatic Sea. In return for protection, these eight Neo-Latin cities often furnished a contingent to the army or navy of their suzerain, and sometimes paid tribute either in money or in kind. Arbe (now Rab), for example, annually paid ten pounds of silk or five pounds of gold to Venice. The Dalmatian cities might elect their own chief magistrate, bishop, and judges; their Roman law remained valid, and they were even permitted to conclude separate alliances.

In these centuries, the Dalmatian language started to disappear, assimilated by the Venetian language. Dalmatian was spoken on the Dalmatian coast from Flumen (now Rijeka) as far south as Cottorum (Kotor) in Montenegro. Speakers lived mainly in the coastal towns of Jadera (Zadar), Tragurium (Trogir), Spalatum (Split), Ragusium (Dubrovnik), and also on the islands of Curicta (Krk), Crepsa (Cres), and Arba (Rab). Almost every city developed its own dialect, but the most important dialects now known were Vegliot, a northern dialect spoken on the island of Curicta, and Ragusan, a southern dialect spoken in and around Ragusa (Dubrovnik).

The cities of Jadera, Spalatum, Tragurium, and Ragusium and the surrounding territories each changed hands several times between Venice, Hungary, and Byzantium during the 12th century. In 1202, the armies of the Fourth Crusade rendered assistance to Venice by occupying Jadera, which started to be officially called Zara. In 1204, the same army conquered Byzantium and finally eliminated the Eastern Empire from the list of contenders on the Dalmatian territory.

The late 13th century was marked by a decline in external hostilities. The Dalmatian cities started accepting complete foreign sovereignty, mainly that of the Republic of Venice. The only exception was Ragusium, which remained independent creating the Republic of Ragusa, which later ended in 1808 after the Napoleon conquest.

From 1420 started the Venetian domination of the other seven of the original Dalmatian city-states, which were fully integrated with the Venetian (and Italian) society of the Italian Renaissance. Zara become the capital of Venetian Dalmatia—as part of the Stato da Mar—until the end of the Republic of Venice (1797). In the next centuries, the city was the main center of the Dalmatian Italians.

The last speaker of any Dalmatian dialect of the Dalmatian city-states was Tuone Udaina (Italian: Antonio Udina), who was accidentally killed in an explosion on June 10, 1898, on the island of Veglia (now Krk). With him disappeared the last vestige of the Dalmatian Neo-Latin cities. His language was studied by the scholar Matteo Bartoli, himself a native of nearby Istria, who visited Udaina in 1897 and wrote down approximately 2,800 words, stories, and accounts of his life. These were published in a book which has since provided much information on the vocabulary, phonology, and grammar of the language. Bartoli wrote in Italian and published a translation in German (Das Dalmatische) in 1906; this book is considered the first on ethnic minority disappearance in world literature.

== Dalmatian Pale ==
The boundaries of the eight original Dalmatian city-states were defined by the so-called Dalmatian Pale, the boundary of Roman local laws.

Historian Johannes Lucius included Flumen (now Rijeka) and Sebenico (now Šibenik) after the year 1000, when Venice started to take control of the region, in the Dalmatian Pale.

Indeed, Flumen was the former Roman Tarsatica: a small, fortified city under the Italian Aquileia (and Pola) bishops, enclosed within the town walls which had several defense towers. The town, called Flumen, was granted autonomy in the 11th century by the bishop and was divided into two parts: in the upper part was the medieval Trsat Castle (formerly a Roman fort) and the church of St. Vitus (thus the name 'Flumen Sancti Viti'), while in the lower part (the popular) there was a commercial and trading center where many Italian merchants settled around the year 1000.

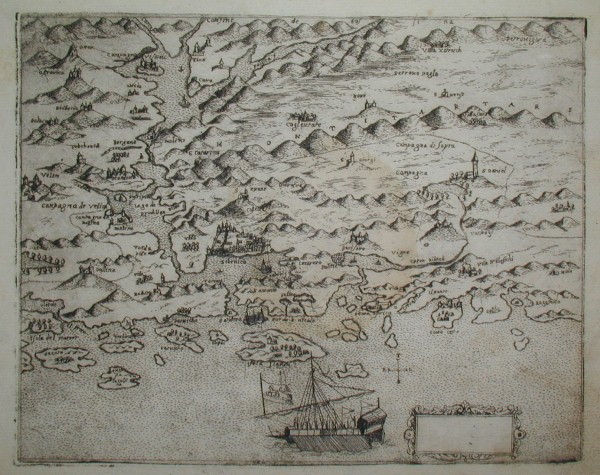
16th-century map of Sebenicum

South of the ancient Roman municipium of Burnum, which disappeared after its heyday in the 2nd century, the town of Šibenik or Sebenico was founded by the Croats. In 1298, Pope Boniface VIII signed a "bolla" that declared a bishop for the town, that so was to be a "free city" from the local Ban Paul I Šubić of Bribir.

Furthermore, about Sebenico, Thomas Jackson wrote that:

In 1167 Stephen III raised Sebenico to the rank of a 'free city' conferring on it a charter and privileges similar to those enjoyed by the old Dalmatian cities of Trau and Spalato, and from that time forward Sebenico must be reckoned as within the 'Dalmatian Pale', though a Croatian town by descent and tradition. Lucio says the Sebenzani were some time in learning to wear their new privileges easily; accustomed for so long to be governed despotically, they accommodated themselves with difficulty to the Dalmatian (Latin) laws; they had Counts appointed for life, and not for a short term like the other cities, who were with difficulty restrained from their old habits of piracy, and they were more exposed than the other cities to the arbitrary interference of the Ban. Gradually however the Sebenzani became Latinized, and in later ages, the city was described by Fortis as next to Zara the best built-in Dalmatia, and inhabited by the greatest number of noble families, as far removed from the barbarous manners of ancient pirates as their houses are unlike the former cottages or sibice; and the same writer tells us that in the sixteenth century the arts and sciences flourished in this city more than in any other of Dalmatia.

Lucius wrote even that Pagus (the Venetian Pago, now called Pag) had municipal autonomy and was virtually independent for centuries around the year 1000. In 1244, the Hungarian King Béla IV named it a "free royal city" and in 1376, Louis I of Hungary granted it autonomy. In 1409, Pago, together with the whole island, passed permanently to the Republic of Venice and reconfirmed their communal autonomy guaranteed by a board of 50 civic local aristocratic families (this board was created in 1451).

== See also ==
- Venetian Dalmatia
- Dalmatian Italians
- Stato da Mar

== Bibliography ==
- Cattalinich, Giovanni. Storia della Dalmazia (Books 1-2; editore Battara, 1834). Oxford University. Oxford, 2007
- Florin, Curta. Southeastern Europe in the Middle Ages, 500-1250. Cambridge University Press. Cambridge, 2006. ISBN 978-0-521-81539-0 ()
- *Fortis, Alberto (1778), Travels into Dalmatia; containing general observations on the natural history of that country and the neighboring islands; the natural productions, arts, manners and customs of the inhabitants: in a series of letters from Abbe Alberto Fortis., London: J. Robson, OCLC 4895425
- Jackson, Thomas. Dalmatia, the Quarnero and Istria with Cettigne in Montenegro and the Island of Grado. Clarendon Press. Oxford, 1887
- Jayne, Kingsley Garland (1911). "Dalmatia" . In Chisholm, Hugh (ed.). Encyclopædia Britannica. Vol. 07 (11th ed.). Cambridge University Press. pp. 772–776.
