= Svetoslav Suronja =

King of Croatia

King of Croatia
- Reign: 997–1000
- Predecessor: Stephen Držislav
- Successor: Krešimir III; Gojslav
- Issue: Stjepan Svetoslavić
- Dynasty: Trpimirović (founder of the Svetoslavić branch)
- Father: Stephen Držislav
- Religion: Christianity

Svetoslav Suronja (Croatian pronunciation: [sʋětoslaʋ sǔːroɲa]), was King of Croatia from 997 to 1000. A member of the Trpimirović dynasty, he reigned with the help of his ban, Varda. John the Deacon (d. 1009) called him "Surinja" (Latin: "Surigna"), adopted in Croatian historiography as "Suronja", meaning "dark man" or "cold man", probably due to his temper. He was the oldest son of king Stephen Držislav, from whom he received the title of duke, and was designated as his successor.

== Rebellion ==
After the death of their father, his brothers Krešimir III and Gojslav started organizing a rebellion against him since Svetoslav rejected sharing power over the kingdom. The brothers had asked Bulgarian emperor Samuil for aid, even though the emperor was at war with the Byzantine Empire. In the war, the Byzantines were supported by Venice and Svetoslav Suronja, who had continued his father's policy. Samuil had accepted the revolters' invitation and attacked Croatia in 998, which started the last of three Croatian-Bulgarian wars. In his rampage, he took all of Croatian Dalmatia up to Zadar after which he ended his rampage, returning home to Bulgaria through Bosnia. Samuil gave all the territory he took to the revolters Krešimir and Gojslav. Using this newly gained territory and further Bulgarian aid, the brothers overthrew their elder brother, Svetoslav Suronja, and became rulers of Croatia.

== War with Venice ==
Svetoslav's reign was particularly unpleasant for the Dalmatian cities, as they were occasionally raided and pillaged by his supporters. The cities asked the Venetian Republic for help in the autumn of 999, which encouraged Venice to make a pact with the Byzantine Empire in order to secure the cities for themselves. Taking the Croatian raids as a casus belli, the Venetian Doge Pietro II Orseolo launched a campaign in Dalmatia against Croatia in 1000. In May, Croatia lost the islands Cres, Lošinj, Krk and Rab to the Doge, who was eventually received in Zadar and recognised as its master. Svetoslav sent envoys to the city offering peace, but the Doge declined and decided to further his campaign. From here the island Pašman was taken and, with negotiations, the city of Biograd.

He was the father of Stjepan Svetoslavić.

== See also ==
- Croatian-Bulgarian Wars
- Trpimirović dynasty
- History of Croatia
- List of rulers of Croatia

== Sources ==
- Intervju - ДИНАСТИЈЕ и владари јужнословенских народа. Special Edition 12, 16 June 1989.

Svetoslav Suronja Trpimirović Dynasty Died: c. 1000
Regnal titles
Preceded by Stjepan Držislav	King of Croatia; 997–1000	Succeeded by Krešimir III and Gojslav
