= Kingdom of Croatia (925–1102) =

Medieval kingdom

Kingdom of Croatia (and Dalmatia): Regnum Croatiae (et Dalmatiae) (Latin)
- c. 925^{a}–1102
- Depiction of the Crown of Zvonimir

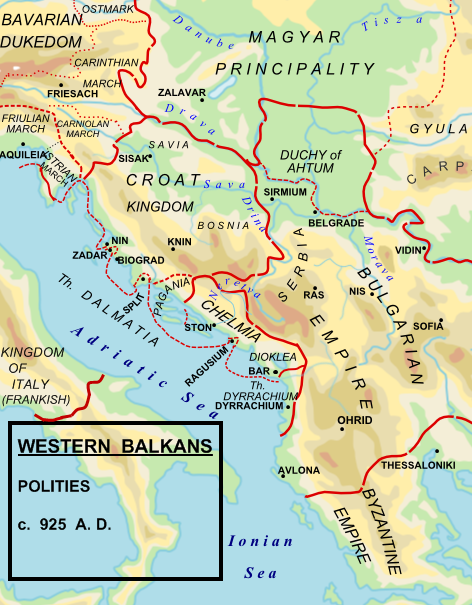
- Croatia during the reign of King Tomislav
- Capital: Varied through time Nin; Biograd; Solin; Knin
- Common languages: Old Croatian; Old Church Slavonic; Latin
- Religion: Chalcedonian Christianity (925–1054); Roman Catholicism (from 1054)
- Demonyms: Croatian, Croat
- Government: Feudal Monarchy
- King
  - 925–928 (first): Tomislav^{a}
  - 1093–1097 (last): Petar Snačić
- Ban (Viceroy)
  - c. 949–969 (first): Pribina
  - c. 1075–1091 (last): Petar Snačić
- Historical era: Middle Ages
  - Elevation to kingdom: c. 925
  - Succession crisis and coronation of King Coloman of Hungary: 1102
Preceded by	Succeeded by
Duchy of Croatia; Duchy of Lower Pannonia	Kingdom of Croatia in union with Hungary
- 1. Tomislav is regarded as the first king due to being addressed as Rex (King) in a letter sent by Pope John X and the Council conclusions of Split in 925 AD. Circumstances and the date of his coronation are unknown. The authenticity of the Papal letter has been questioned, but later inscriptions and charters confirm that his successors called themselves "kings".

The Kingdom of Croatia (Modern Croatian: Kraljevina Hrvatska, Hrvatsko Kraljevstvo; Latin: Regnum Croatiæ), and since 1060 known as Kingdom of Croatia and Dalmatia (Latin: Regnum Croatiae et Dalmatiae), was a medieval kingdom in Southern Europe comprising most of what is today Croatia (without western Istria, some Dalmatian coastal cities, and the part of Dalmatia south of the Neretva River), as well as most of the modern-day Bosnia and Herzegovina. The Croatian Kingdom was ruled for part of its existence by ethnic dynasties, and the Kingdom existed as a sovereign state for nearly two centuries. Its existence was characterized by various conflicts and periods of peace or alliance with the Bulgarians, Byzantines, Hungarians, and competition with Venice for control over the eastern Adriatic coast. The goal of promoting the Croatian language in the religious service was initially introduced by the 10th century bishop Gregory of Nin, which resulted in a conflict with the Pope, later to be put down by him. In the second half of the 11th century Croatia managed to secure most coastal cities of Dalmatia with the collapse of Byzantine control over them. During this time the kingdom reached its peak under the rule of kings Peter Krešimir IV (1058–1074) and Demetrius Zvonimir (1075–1089).

The state was ruled mostly by the Trpimirović dynasty until 1091. At that point the realm experienced a succession crisis and after a decade of conflicts for the throne and the aftermath of the Battle of Gvozd Mountain, the crown passed to the Árpád dynasty with the coronation of King Coloman of Hungary as "King of Croatia and Dalmatia" in Biograd in 1102, uniting the two kingdoms under one crown.

The precise terms of the relationship between the two realms became a matter of dispute in the 19th century. The nature of the relationship varied through time, with Croatia retaining a large degree of internal autonomy overall, while the real power rested in the hands of the local nobility. Modern Croatian and Hungarian historiographies mostly view the relations between the Kingdom of Croatia and the Kingdom of Hungary from 1102 as a form of unequal personal union of two internally autonomous kingdoms united by a common Hungarian king.

== Name ==
The first official name of the country was "Kingdom of the Croats" (Latin: Regnum Croatorum; Croatian: Kraljevstvo Hrvata), but over the course of time the name "Kingdom of Croatia" (Regnum Croatiae; Kraljevina Hrvatska) prevailed. Although already Tomislav, King of Croatia in 925 "ruled in the province of the Croats and in the Dalmatian regions" (in provincia Croatorum et Dalmatiarum finibus), only from 1060 when king Peter Krešimir IV gained control over the Dalmatian city-states of the Theme of Dalmatia, formerly under the Byzantine Empire, the official and diplomatic name of the kingdom became "Kingdom of Croatia and Dalmatia" (Regnum Croatiae et Dalmatiae; Kraljevina Hrvatska i Dalmacija), with which title of "Rex Chroatie atque Dalmatie" was crowned Demetrius Zvonimir in 1075/1076. Another often Hungarian synonym, as used by Ladislaus I of Hungary in his 1091 diplomatic letter, was Sclavoniam iam fere totam (acquisivi) ("Whole of S(c)lavonia"). In other European documents Sclavonia was also a common synonym for Croatia and Dalmatia.

== Background ==
The Slavs arrived in southeastern Europe in the early 7th century and established several states, including the Duchy of Croatia. The Christianization of the Croats began soon after their arrival and was completed by the beginning of the 9th century. The rule over the duchy alternated between the rival Domagojević and Trpimirović dynasties. The duchy was rivaled by the neighbouring Republic of Venice, fought and allied with the First Bulgarian Empire, and went through periods of vassalage to the Carolingian Empire and the Byzantine Empire. In 879, Pope John VIII recognized Duke Branimir as an independent ruler.

== History ==
=== Kingdom ===
==== Establishment ====
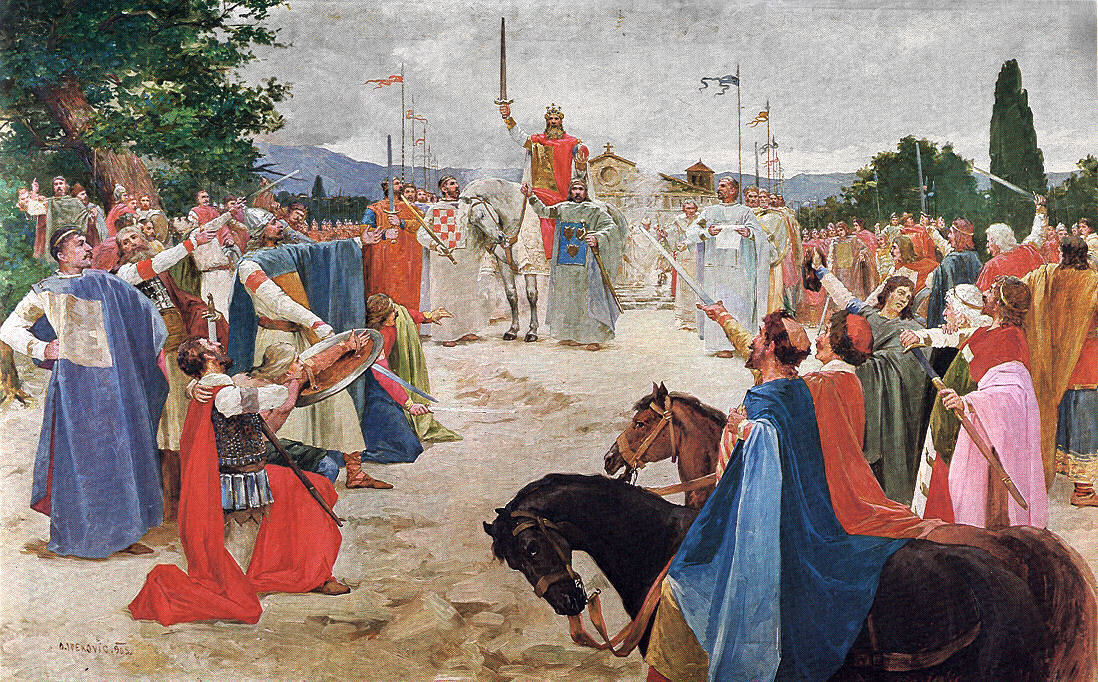
Coronation of King Tomislav as imagined by Croatian romanticist painter Oton Iveković.

Croatia was elevated to the status of kingdom somewhere around 925. Tomislav was the first Croatian ruler whom the papal chancellery honoured with the title "king". It is generally said that Tomislav was crowned in 925, but it is not known when or by whom he was crowned, or, indeed, if he was crowned at all. Tomislav is mentioned as a king in two preserved documents published in the Historia Salonitana. First in a note preceding the text of the conclusions of the Council of Split in 925, where it is written that Tomislav is the "king" ruling "in the province of the Croats and in the Dalmatian regions" (in prouintia Croatorum et Dalmatiarum finibus Tamisclao rege), while in the 12th canon of the Council conclusions the ruler of the Croats is called "king" (rex et proceres Chroatorum). In a letter sent by Pope John X, Tomislav is named "King of the Croats" (Tamisclao, regi Crouatorum). The Chronicle of the Priest of Duklja titled Tomislav as a king and specified his rule at 13 years. Although there are no inscriptions of Tomislav to confirm the title, later inscriptions and charters confirm that his 10th century successors called themselves "kings". Under his rule, Croatia became one of the most powerful kingdoms in the Balkans.

Tomislav, a descendant of Trpimir I, is considered one of the most prominent members of the Trpimirović dynasty. Sometime between 923 and 928, Tomislav succeeded in uniting the Croats of Pannonia and Dalmatia, each of which had been ruled separately by dukes. Although the exact geographical extent of Tomislav's kingdom is not fully known, Croatia probably covered most of Dalmatia, Pannonia, and northern and western Bosnia. Croatia at the time was administered as a group of eleven counties (županije) and one banate (Banovina). Each of these regions had a fortified royal town.

Croatia soon came into conflict with the Bulgarian Empire under Simeon I (called Simeon the Great in Bulgaria), who was already in a war with the Byzantines. Tomislav made a pact with the Byzantine Empire, for which he may have been rewarded by the Byzantine Emperor Romanos I Lekapenos with some form of control over the coastal cities of the Byzantine Theme of Dalmatia and with a share of the tribute collected from them. After Simeon conquered the Principality of Serbia in 924, Croatia received and protected the expelled Serbs with their leader Zaharija. In 926, Simeon tried to break the Croatian-Byzantine pact and afterwards conquer the weakly defended Byzantine Theme of Dalmatia, sending Duke Alogobotur with a formidable army against Tomislav, but Simeon's army was defeated in the Battle of the Bosnian Highlands. After Simeon's death in 927 peace was restored between Croatia and Bulgaria with the mediation of the legates of Pope John X. According to the contemporary De Administrando Imperio, the Croatian army and navy at the time could have consisted of approximately 100,000 infantry units, 60,000 cavaliers, and 80 larger (sagina) and 100 smaller warships (condura), but these numbers are generally taken as a considerable exaggeration. According to the palaeographic analysis of the original manuscript of De Administrando Imperio, the population of medieval Croatia was estimated at between 440,000 and 880,000 people, while the military force was most probably composed of 20,000–100,000 infantrymen and 3,000–24,000 horsemen organized into 60 allagions.

==== 10th century ====
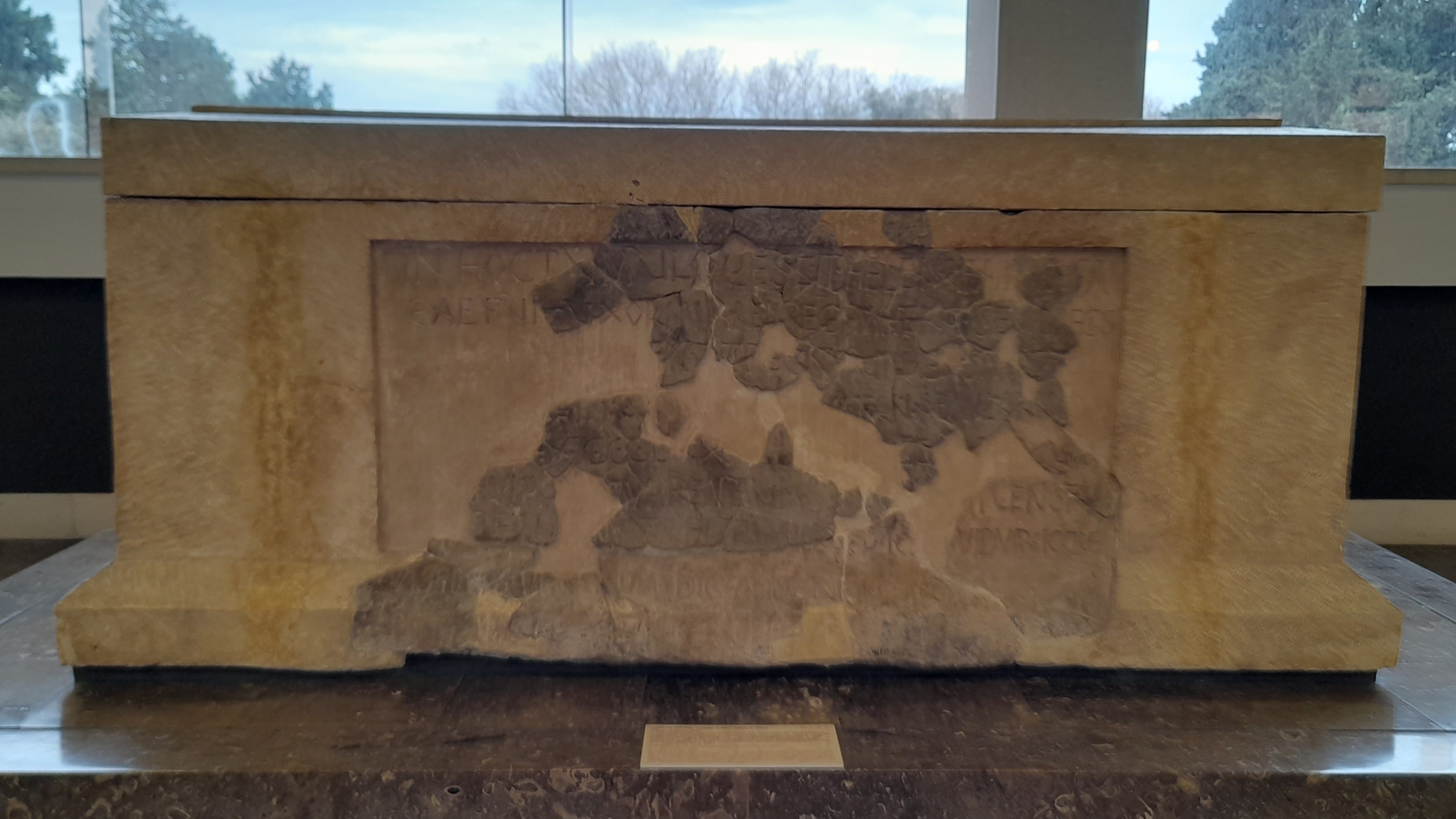
10th century Queen Helen's Epitaph.

Croatian society underwent major changes in the 10th century. Local leaders, the župani, were replaced by the retainers of the king, who took land from the previous landowners, essentially creating a feudal system. The previously free peasants became serfs and ceased being soldiers, causing the military power of Croatia to fade.

Tomislav was succeeded by Trpimir II (c. 928–935) and Krešimir I (c. 935–945), who each managed to maintain their power and keep good relations with both the Byzantine Empire and the Pope. This period, on the whole, however, is obscure. The rule of Krešimir's son Miroslav was marked by a gradual weakening of Croatia. Various peripheral territories took advantage of unsettled conditions to secede. Miroslav ruled for 4 years when he was killed by his ban, Pribina, during an internal power struggle. Pribina secured the throne to Michael Krešimir II (949–969), who restored order throughout most of the state. He kept particularly good relations with Dalmatian city-states, he and his wife Helen donating land and churches to Zadar and Solin. Michael Krešimir's wife Helen built the Churches of Saint Mary and Saint Stephen in Solin that served as the tomb of Croatian rulers (see Church of Saint Stephen on Otok). Helen died on 8 October 976 and was buried in that church, where a royal inscription on her sarcophagus was found that called her "Mother of the Kingdom".

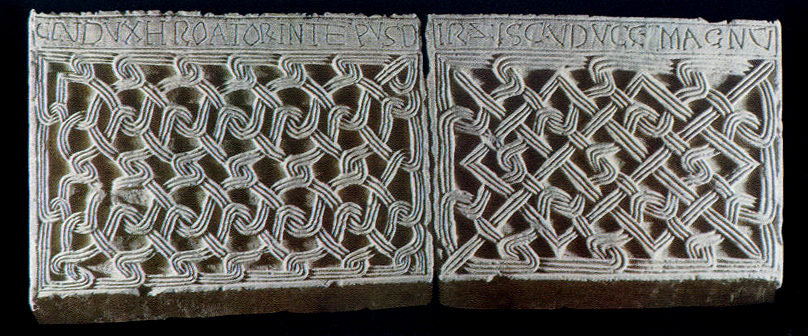
The wattle (pleter) with the inscription of king Stephen Držislav, 10th century.

Michael Krešimir II was succeeded by his son Stephen Držislav (969–997), who established better relations with the Byzantine Empire and their Theme of Dalmatia. According to Historia Salonitana, Držislav received royal insignia from the Byzantines, together with the title of eparch and patricius. Also, according to this work, from the time of Držislav's reign his successors called themselves "kings of Croatia and Dalmatia". Stone panels from the altar of a 10th-century church in Knin with the inscription of Držislav, possibly when he was the heir to the throne, show that there was a precisely defined hierarchy regulating the matters of succession to the throne.

==== 11th century ====
As soon as Stjepan Držislav had died in 997, his three sons, Svetoslav (997–1000), Krešimir III (1000–1030), and Gojslav (1000–1020), opened a violent contest for the throne, weakening the state and allowing the Venetians under Pietro II Orseolo and the Bulgarians under Samuil to encroach on the Croatian possessions along the Adriatic. In 1000, Orseolo led the Venetian fleet into the eastern Adriatic and gradually took control of the whole of it, first the islands of the Gulf of Kvarner and Zadar, then Trogir and Split, followed by a successful naval battle with the Narentines upon which he took control of Korčula and Lastovo, and claimed the title dux Dalmatiæ. Krešimir III tried to restore the Dalmatian cities and had some success until 1018, when he was defeated by Venice allied with the Lombards. The same year his kingdom briefly became a vassal of the Byzantine Empire until 1025 and the death of Basil II. His son, Stjepan I (1030–1058), only went so far as to get the Narentine duke to become his vassal in 1050.

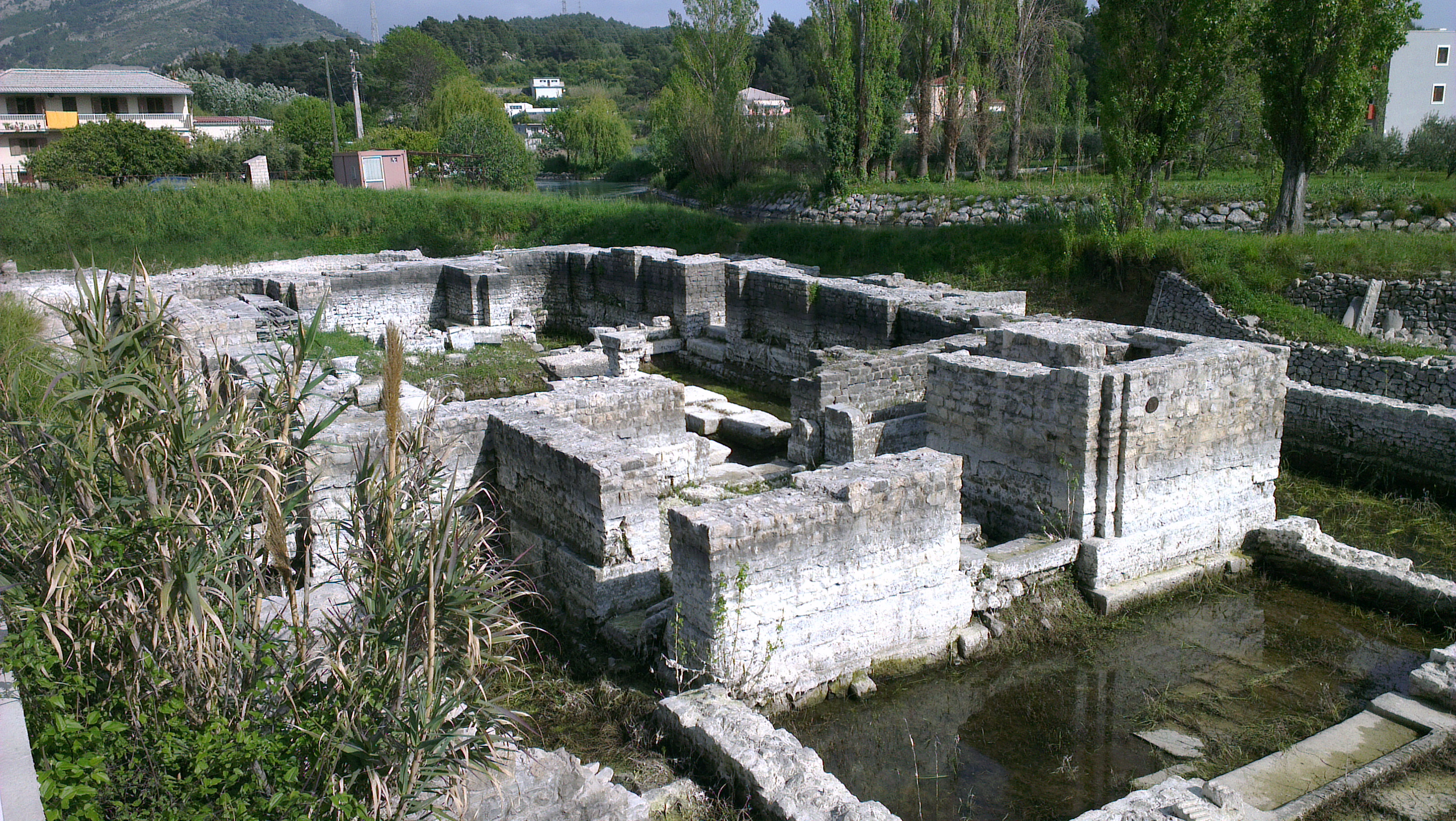
King Zvonimir's corronation place in Church of Saint Peter and Moses in Solin.

During the reign of Krešimir IV (1058–1074), the medieval Croatian kingdom reached its territorial peak. Krešimir managed to get the Byzantine Empire to confirm him as the supreme ruler of the Dalmatian cities, i.e., over the Theme of Dalmatia, excluding the theme of Ragusa and the Duchy of Durazzo. He also allowed the Roman curia to become more involved in the religious affairs of Croatia, which consolidated his power but disrupted his rule over the Glagolitic clergy in parts of Istria after 1060. Croatia under Krešimir IV was composed of twelve counties and was slightly larger than in Tomislav's time. It included the closest southern Dalmatian duchy of Pagania, and its influence extended over Zahumlje, Travunia, and Duklja. The župans (heads of counties) had their own private armies. The names of court titles in their vernacular form appear for the first time during his reign, such as vratar ("door-keeper") Jurina, postelnik ("chamberlain") and so on. The Roman Catholic Church reforms, which imposed a ban on the use of Slavonic liturgy and introduced Latin as obligatory, were confirmed by Pope Alexander II in 1063. This led to a rebellion in the kingdom by the counter-reform camp, primarily in the Kvarner region. While King Krešimir IV sided with the Pope, expecting a victory of the pro-Latin clergy, support for the counter-reform clergy was provided by Antipope Honorius II. The rebellion was led by a priest named Vulfo on the island of Krk. Although the rebels were quickly suppressed, Slavonic liturgy held out in the Kvarner region, as well as the use of Glagolitic script.

However, in 1072, Krešimir assisted the Bulgarian and Serb uprising against their Byzantine masters. The Byzantines retaliated in 1074 by sending the Norman count Amico of Giovinazzo to besiege Rab. They failed to capture the island, but did manage to capture the king himself, and the Croatians were then forced to settle and give away Split, Trogir, Zadar, Biograd, and Nin to the Normans. In 1075, Venice expelled the Normans and secured the cities for itself. The end of Krešimir IV in 1074 also marked the de facto end of the Trpimirović dynasty, which had ruled the Croatian lands for over two centuries.

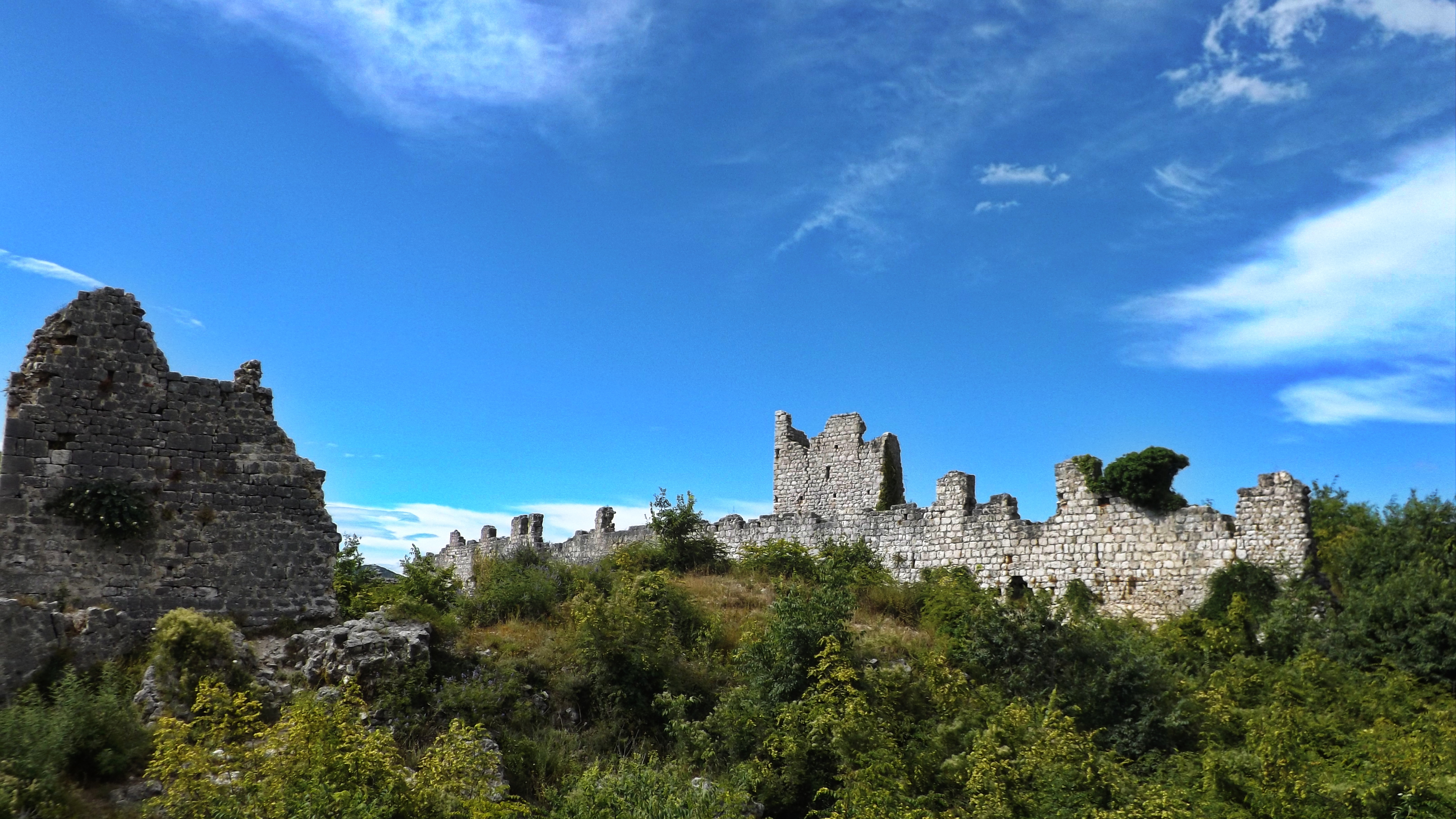
Upon being crowned King of Dalmatia and Croatia in 1075, king Zvonimir donated the Vrana monastery, whose ruins can be seen in the picture, to the Holy See as their permanent residence in Croatia.

Krešimir was succeeded by Demetrius Zvonimir (1075–1089) of the Svetoslavić branch of the House of Trpimirović. He was previously a ban of Croatia in the service of Peter Krešimir IV and later the Duke of Croatia. He gained the title of king with the support of Pope Gregory VII and was crowned at Hollow Church in Solin as King of Croatia in Solin on 8 October 1075. Zvonimir aided the Normans under Robert Guiscard in their struggle against the Byzantine Empire and Venice between 1081 and 1085. Zvonimir helped to transport their troops through the Strait of Otranto and to occupy the city of Dyrrhachion. His troops assisted the Normans in many battles along the Albanian and Greek coast. Due to this, in 1085, the Byzantines transferred their rights in Dalmatia to Venice.

Zvonimir's kinghood is carved in stone on the Baška Tablet, preserved to this day as one of the oldest written Croatian texts, kept in the archæological museum in Zagreb. Zvonimir's reign is remembered as a peaceful and prosperous time, during which the connection of Croats with the Holy See was further affirmed, so much so that Catholicism would remain among Croats until the present day. In this time the noble titles in Croatia were made analogous to those used in other parts of Europe at the time, with comes and baron used for the župani and the royal court nobles, and vlastelin for the noblemen. The Croatian state was edging closer to western Europe and further from the east. Demetrius Zvonimir married Helen of Hungary in 1063. Queen Helen was a Hungarian princess, the daughter of King Béla I of the Hungarian Árpád dynasty, and was the sister of the future Hungarian King Ladislaus I. Zvonimir and Helen had a son, Radovan, who died in his late teens or early twenties. King Demetrius Zvonimir died in 1089. The exact circumstances of his death are uncertain. According to a later, likely unsubstantiated legend, King Zvonimir was killed during a revolt in 1089.

There was no permanent state capital, as the royal residence varied from one ruler to another; five cities in total reportedly obtained the title of a royal seat: Nin (Krešimir IV), Biograd (Stephen Držislav, Krešimir IV), Knin (Zvonimir, Petar Snačić), Šibenik (Krešimir IV), and Solin (Krešimir II).

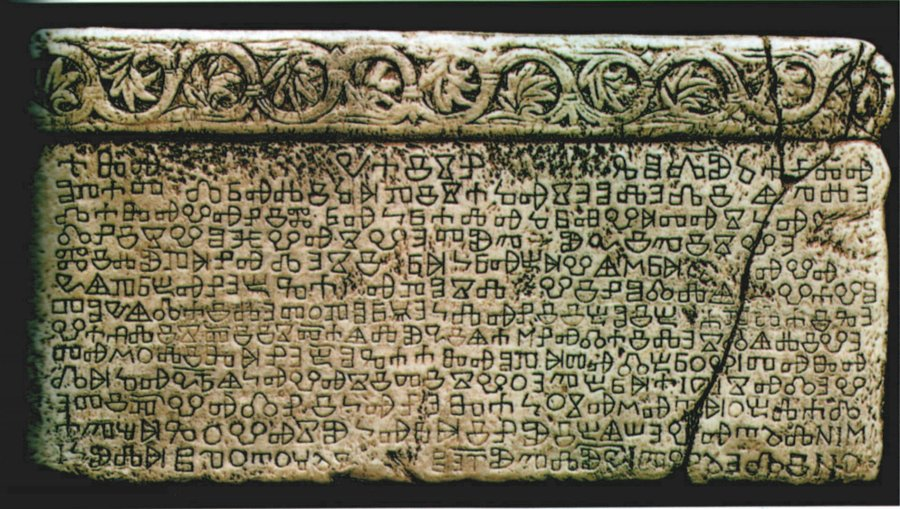
11th century Baška tablet.

According to the Provinciale Vetus (published in late 12th century), in the Kingdom of Croatia and Dalmatia around 1075 existed 20 bishopric civitas, including civitas Salona (Solin-Split), Jadera (Zadar), Scandona (Skradin), Tragurium (Trogir), Belgradum (Biograd na Moru), Arbum (Rab), Absara (Osor), Vecla (Krk), Sissia (Sisak), Ragusium (Dubrovnik), Catara (Kotor), Stagnum (Ston), Mucrona (Muccur, Makar), Bosna (Visoko), Dulcinium (Ulcinj), Suacium (Svač), Antibarum (Bar), Delmenia (Omiš) and Nona (Nin). Roughly similar boundaries are reproduced in the 14th century Croatian redaction of the Chronicle of the Priest of Duklja (the Hungarian king "gained possession of all the parts of the [Croatian] kingdom: Bosnia, Croatia, Dalmatia, Narona. But the Croats, as rebels and parricide of their lord, he oppressed with labor and servitude. Moreover, when after this the kingdom was divided into parts, the Bosnians got their lord, the Narentines theirs, only the Croats a foreigner"), and Catalogus ducem et regum Dalmatie et Croatie ("after this, as the holy king had prophesied, the Croats were ruled by the Hungarians, and the Bosnians and also the Neretva people obeyed their own prince").

=== Succession crisis ===
Stephen II (reigned 1089–1091) of the main Trpimirović line came to the throne at an old age. Stephen II was to be the last king of the House of Trpimirović. His rule was relatively ineffectual and lasted less than two years. He spent most of this time in the tranquility of the Monastery of St. Stephen beneath the Pines near Split. He died at the beginning of 1091, without leaving an heir. Since there was no living male member of the House of Trpimirović, civil war broke out shortly afterward.

The widow of the late King Zvonimir, Helen, probably tried to keep power in Croatia during the succession crisis. According to some sources, several Dalmatian cities also asked King Ladislaus for assistance, and Petar Gusić with Petar de genere Cacautonem presented themselves as "White Croats" (Creates Albi), on his court. Thus the campaign launched by Ladislaus was not purely a foreign aggression, nor did he appear on the Croatian throne as a conqueror, but rather as hereditary successor. In 1091 Ladislaus crossed the Drava river and conquered the entire province of Slavonia (Messia, meaning middle province, while Sclavonia denoted Kingdom of Croatia and Dalmatia) without encountering opposition, but his campaign was halted near the Gvozd Mountain (Mala Kapela). Since the Croatian nobles were divided, Ladislaus had some success in his campaign, yet he wasn't able to establish his control over the entirety of Croatia, although the exact extent of his conquest is not known. At this time the Kingdom of Hungary was attacked by the Cumans, who were likely sent by Byzantium, so Ladislaus was forced to retreat from his campaign in Croatia. Ladislaus appointed his nephew Prince Álmos to administer the controlled area of Croatia, established the Diocese of Zagreb as a symbol of his new authority and went back to Hungary. In the midst of the war, Petar Snačić was elected king by Croatian feudal lords in 1093. Petar's seat of power was based in Knin. His rule was marked by a struggle for control of the country with Álmos, who wasn't able to establish his rule and was forced to withdraw to Hungary in 1095.

Ladislaus died in 1095, leaving his nephew Coloman to continue the campaign. Coloman, as well as Ladislaus before him, wasn't seen as a conqueror but rather as a pretender to the Croatian throne. The written experiences of Raymond of Aguilers, and later William of Tyre, of the First Crusaders, specifically the passage of the army of Raymond IV, Count of Toulouse from "Istria near Aquileia and at length reached Dalmatia" a land which "extends longitudinally between Hungary and the Adriatic sea" with "four large cities: Zara, Salona, also called Spalato, Antivari, and Ragusa", was through forest and marshes of Lika and Dalmatia in late 1096, and show that in the country called Sclavonia or Dalmatia i.e. Kingdom of Croatia and Dalmatia, was no authority to agree the terms of passage and relations with the people. This indicates "state of anarchy". In the Crusader's accounts (of Raymond of Aguilers), described with biblical expression, the army travelled for 40 days through the mountains, forests and fog without trade and guide from "barbaric" and "fierce" native population who avoided them, leaving strongholds and villages desolate and attacked army's rearguard. In retaliation and to discourage further attacks, count Raymond of Toulouse ordered mutilation of six captured Slavs. Peter Tudebode in Historia de Hierosolymitano itinere wrote that Raymond "lost many noble knights while passing through Sclavonia". After passing across Sclavonia they arrived to Shkodër the capital of the kingdom of Duklja where Raymond came in contact with Constantine Bodin.

Coloman eventually assembled a large army to press his claim on the throne and in 1097 defeated King Petar's troops in the Battle of Gvozd Mountain, where the latter was killed. Since the Croatians didn't have a leader any more and Dalmatia had numerous fortified towns that would be difficult to defeat, negotiations started between Coloman and the Croatian feudal lords. It took several more years before the Croatian nobility recognised Coloman as the king. Coloman was crowned in Biograd in 1102 and the title now claimed by Coloman was "King of Hungary, Dalmatia, and Croatia". Some of the terms of his coronation are summarized in Pacta Conventa by which the Croatian nobles agreed to recognise Coloman as king. In return, the 12 Croatian nobles that signed the agreement retained their lands and properties and were granted exemption from tax or tributes. The nobles were to send at least ten armed horsemen each beyond the Drava River at the king's expense if his borders were attacked. Despite the fact that the Pacta Conventa is not an authentic document from 1102, there was almost certainly some kind of contract or agreement between the Croatian nobles and Coloman which regulated the relations in the same way.

==== Unification ====
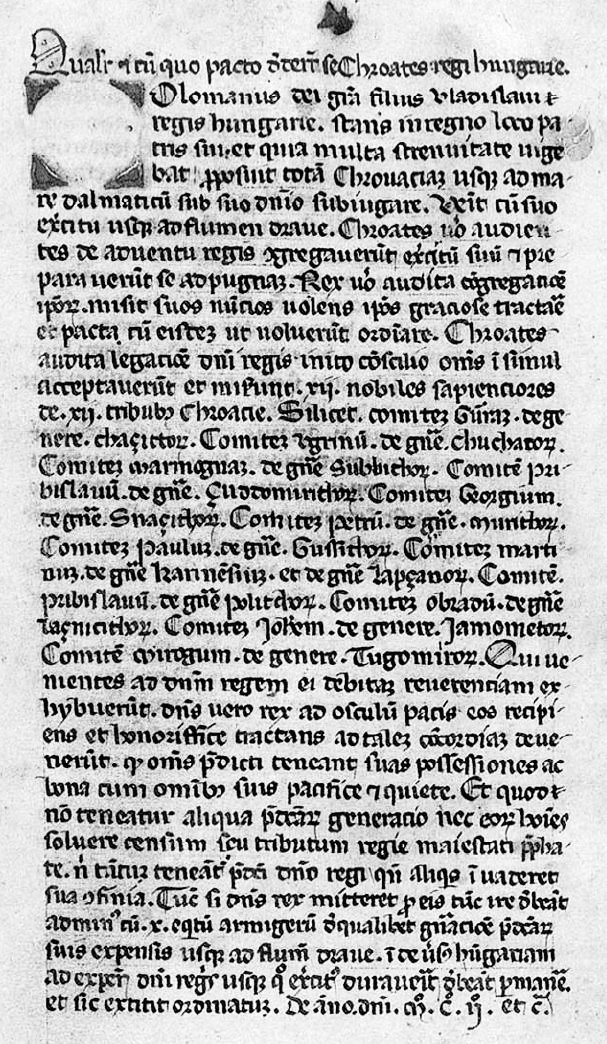
A 14th-century transcript of the Pacta conventa, preserved in the Hungarian National Museum. Most historians consider it a forgery, but that the contents of it corresponds to the reality of rule in Croatia.

In 1102, after the succession crisis, the crown passed into the hands of the Árpád dynasty, with the crowning of King Coloman of Hungary as "King of Croatia and Dalmatia" in Biograd. The precise terms of the union between the two realms became a matter of dispute in the 19th century. The two kingdoms were united under the Árpád dynasty either by the choice of the Croatian nobility or by Hungarian force. Croatian historians hold that the union was a personal one in the form of a shared king, a view also accepted by a number of Hungarian historians, while Serbian and Hungarian nationalist historians preferred to see it as a form of annexation. The claim of a Hungarian occupation was made in the 19th century during the Hungarian national reawakening. Thus in older Hungarian historiography Coloman's coronation in Biograd was a subject of dispute and their stance was that Croatia was conquered. Although these kinds of claims can also be found today, since the Croatian-Hungarian tensions are gone, it has generally been accepted that Coloman was crowned in Biograd as king. Today, Hungarian legal historians hold that the relationship of Hungary with the area of Croatia and Dalmatia in the period till 1526 and the death of Louis II was most similar to a personal union, resembling the relationship of Scotland to England.

According to the Worldmark Encyclopedia of Nations and the Grand Larousse encyclopédique, Croatia entered a personal union with Hungary in 1102, which remained the basis of the Hungarian-Croatian relationship until 1918, while Encyclopædia Britannica specified the union as a dynastic one. According to the research of the Library of Congress, Coloman crushed opposition after the death of Ladislaus I and won the crown of Dalmatia and Croatia in 1102, thus forging a link between the Croatian and Hungarian crowns that lasted until the end of World War I. Hungarian culture permeated northern Croatia, the Croatian-Hungarian border shifted often, and at times Hungary treated Croatia as a vassal state. Croatia had its own local governor, or Ban; a privileged landowning nobility; and an assembly of nobles, the Sabor. According to some historians, Croatia became part of Hungary in the late 11th and early 12th century, yet the actual nature of the relationship is difficult to define. Sometimes Croatia acted as an independent agent and at other times as a vassal of Hungary. However, Croatia retained a large degree of internal independence. The degree of Croatian autonomy fluctuated throughout the centuries as did its borders.

The alleged agreement called Pacta conventa (English: Agreed accords) or Qualiter (first word of the text) is today viewed as a 14th-century forgery by most modern Croatian historians. According to the document King Coloman and the twelve heads of the Croatian nobles made an agreement, in which Coloman recognised their autonomy and specific privileges. Although it is not an authentic document from 1102, nonetheless there was at least a non-written agreement that regulated the relations between Hungary and Croatia in approximately the same way, while the content of the alleged agreement is concordant with the reality of rule in Croatia in more than one respect.

The official entering of Croatia into a personal union with Hungary, later becoming part of the Lands of the Crown of St. Stephen, had several important consequences. Institutions of separate Croatian statehood were maintained with the Sabor (parliament) and the ban (viceroy) in the name of the king. A single ban governed all Croatian provinces until 1225, when the authority was split between one ban of the whole of Slavonia and one ban of Croatia and Dalmatia. The positions were intermittently held by the same person after 1345, and officially merged back into one by 1476.

== Union with Hungary ==
In the union with Hungary, the crown was held by the Árpád dynasty, and after its extinction, under the Anjou dynasty. Institutions of separate Croatian statehood were maintained through the Parliament (Croatian: Sabor – an assembly of Croatian nobles) and the ban (viceroy) responsible to the King of Hungary and Croatia. In addition, the Croatian nobles retained their lands and titles. Coloman retained the institution of the Sabor and relieved the Croatians of taxes on their land. Coloman's successors continued to crown themselves as Kings of Croatia separately in Biograd na Moru until the time of Béla IV. In the 14th century a new term arose to describe the collection of de jure independent states under the rule of the Hungarian King: Archiregnum Hungaricum (Lands of the Crown of Saint Stephen). Croatia remained a distinct crown attached to that of Hungary until the abolition of the Austro-Hungarian Empire in 1918.

== Legacy ==
In March 2024, Sabor proclaimed 2025 as "The year of marking the 1100th anniversary of the Kingdom of Croatia" (Croatian: Godina obilježavanja 1100. obljetnice hrvatskoga kraljevstva).

== See also ==
- Kingdom of Croatia (Habsburg)
- Kingdom of Croatia-Slavonia
- History of Croatia
- Pacta conventa (Croatia)
- Crown of Zvonimir
- Bans of Croatia
- Timeline of Croatian history
- List of rulers of Croatia
