= Stephen II of Croatia =

Stephen II

King of Croatia
- Reign: 1089–1090/91
- Coronation: 1089
- Predecessor: Demetrius Zvonimir
- Successor: Petar Snačić
- Died: December 1090 or beginning of 1091
- Burial: Church of St. Stephen, Solin
- Dynasty: Trpimirović
- Father: Gojslav II
- Religion: Catholicism

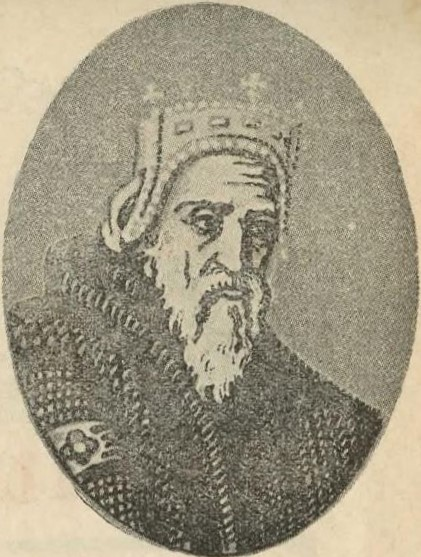
Stephen II of Croatia

Stephen II (Croatian: Stjepan II) was the last member of the Trpimirović dynasty and last native king of Croatia to rule the entire medieval Croatian Kingdom. Stephen's father was Gojslav, the younger brother of Peter Krešimir IV of Croatia. Stephen was duke of Croatia under Krešimir around 1066.

He was due to succeed Peter Krešimir IV but was sidelined by the people and clergy in 1075 who instead bestowed the title of king on Demetrius Zvonimir, previously a ban in Slavonia.

Stephen II was forced to live in the monastery of St Stephen Beneath the Pines (Sv. Stjepan pod borovima) on the peninsula of Sustipan, near Split. The formal reason for life in the monastery is an alleged illness, so in his charter from 1078, Stephen writes:

I, Stephen, once glittering Prince of the Croats, devastated by a bad illness, call upon the honorable priests of the Croatian kingdom to find a remedy for my sins. Of their advice I took heed, and let myself be brought to the monastery of St Stephen. Here I was relieved of all my honours and had chosen the grabe, recommending the monastery's leader to mention me in his prayers.

King Demetrius Zvonimir was a member of the junior Svetoslavić branch of the House of Trpimirović (descendants of Svetoslav Suronja). By the time Demetrius Zvonimir died in 1089, Stephen was old and seriously affected by ill health. Nevertheless, he assumed the throne after being persuaded by the aristocracy and clergy.

Stephen's rule was relatively ineffectual and lasted less than two years. He spent most of this time in the tranquility of the monastery near Split, where he stayed before becoming king. Zvonimir's widow, Queen Jelena, reportedly plotted the inheritance of the Croatian Crown for her brother, King Ladislaus I of Hungary.

Stephen II died peacefully in December 1090, or at the beginning of 1091, without leaving an heir. War and unrest broke out in Croatia shortly afterward, with the southern nobility electing Petar Snačić as King of Croatia in 1093, immediately entering into conflict with the Hungarian king Ladislaus. The war culminated in the Battle of Gvozd Mountain in 1097 leading to a personal union of Croatia and Hungary in 1102, ruled by Coloman.

== See also ==
- List of rulers of Croatia

Regnal titles
Preceded by Demetrius Zvonimir	King of Croatia; 1089–1091	Succeeded by Ladislaus
