= Crown of Zvonimir =

Medieval Croatian crown decorated with crosses

Heraldic depictions

Details
- Country: Croatia
- Made: Before 1075
- Arches: None (circlet)
- Notable stones: 5 gemstones
- Other elements: 3 crosses

The Crown of Zvonimir was bestowed on king Demetrius Zvonimir of Croatia in 1075 by the papal legate of Pope Gregory VII at the Basilica of Saint Peter and Moses (known today as the Hollow Church) at Salona.

It was the third crown of the Croatian Kingdom, as two other golden crowns decorated with gems are mentioned in the coronation charter, located at the Benedictine monastery of St. Gregory in Vrana, the first related to king Tomislav (925–928) and the second to king Stephen Držislav (969–997).

Zvonimir ruled Croatia until 1089 after which the crown was possibly used in the coronation of his successor Stephen II and by the numerous Hungarian monarchs after the unification of the Kingdom of Croatia and Kingdom of Hungary in 1102 (but could have been used instead the previous Croatian crown as were crowned not at Salona yet Biograd na Moru near Vrana). The custom of separate coronation by Hungarian kings was ended by Béla IV of Hungary (1235). By some Croatian crown was crowned Ladislaus of Naples in 1403 at the Zadar Cathedral.

== Overview ==
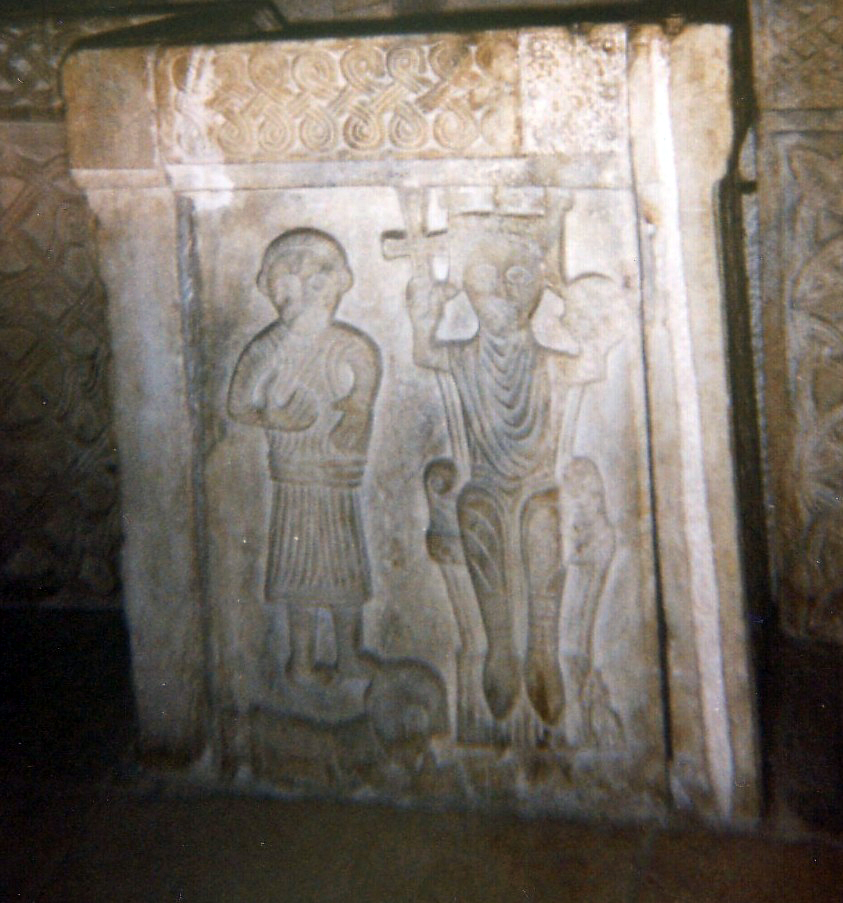
Baptistery with figure of Croatian king from the 11th century, now in the Split Cathedral. The king is suggested to be Petar Krešimir IV or Demetrius Zvonimir.

According to the 11th-century engraving found in a baptistry in Split Cathedral, the crown of the Croatian king, whom some identify with Petar Krešimir IV or Demetrius Zvonimir, resembles the western-styled crown with three crosses, one in the middle and two on the sides. There are five precious stones on the crown. The distinctive long sides could be hanging pendilia as found adorning the Holy Crown of Hungary which was also an 11th-century papal gift. The depicted deditio is considered to be influenced by the Gospel Book of Henry II, Holy Roman Emperor (1014–1024).

Another depiction of a very similar if not the same crown and king Demetrius Zvonimir or Ladislaus I of Hungary is on the latter's mantle dated to 11th century from the Zagreb Cathedral.

A stylised version of the crown is used on several provincial and county flags in modern Croatia and is consistently of the design illustrated here which is taken from an 11th-century engraving found in a baptistry in Split.

Coloman, King of Hungary was crowned King of Croatia and Dalmatia in 1102 in Biograd na Moru, and since then it has been obligatory for Hungarian kings to be crowned separately as King of Croatia and Dalmatia in the same lands. According to the royal charters, and phrase "Cum autem ad vos coronandus aut vobiscum regni negotia tractaturus aduenero" (when I come to be crowned among you), it is considered that the custom of separate coronation by Hungarian kings was last held by Andrew II of Hungary (1205). Those kings from the Arpad dynasty (until 1199), as heirs, first were crowned as the kings of Croatia and Dalmatia to later inherit the Hungarian throne. This custom ended with king Béla IV of Hungary (1235) who was crowned in the same ceremony as the king of Hungary and Croatia.

== Disappearance ==
It is not known whether the medieval Crown of Zvonimir still exists. It is quite possible that all Croatian crowns were lost during the 1520s when the Ottoman Turks captured and sacked the royal capitals of Solin and Knin. However, they could have disappeared even before that, after 1138 when Vrana was occupied by Knights Templar and Knights Hospitaller, after 1403/1409 when Ladislaus of Naples was crowned and Dalmatia was sold to the Republic of Venice, while later, could have been held among treasures of the Zrinski family as supposed by Vjekoslav Klaić.

Recently, Croatian archaeologists M. Ilkić and D. Filipčić proposed thesis that the crown did not disappear, but was partly incorporated into the Holy Crown of Hungary as the "corona latina" (compared to "corona greca" part of the crown). Probably it happened for the coronation of king Béla IV (1235), and according to them, "the only plausible place where Zvonimir's crown could end up, while maintaining the legitimacy of the coronation of new Hungarian-Croatian kings and respecting the tradition and legality of the coronation of Béla IV's predecessors, is within the Hungarian crown". Croatian historian Mladen Ančić disputed the thesis.

== World War II appropriation ==
In 1941, the fascist Ustaše regime assumed control of Croatia and decided to reinstate a monarchy in the Independent State of Croatia, also appropriating the symbols of the medieval Croatian state. They created another "Crown of Zvonimir", though with little resemblance to the original, described as "a wreath of golden clover leaves surmounted by a cross". That crown, as well as an orb in the form of an apple, was then presented to King Victor Emmanuel III of Italy with the request he choose a suitable member of the House of Savoy to be elevated to the proposed Croatian throne as king. He chose Prince Aimone, Duke of Aosta who was then named "King Tomislav II". It seems likely he came into possession of the regalia, though he was never crowned. It is unknown whether this crown remains in existence.

== See also ==
- Medal of the Crown of King Zvonimir
