= Petar Snačić =

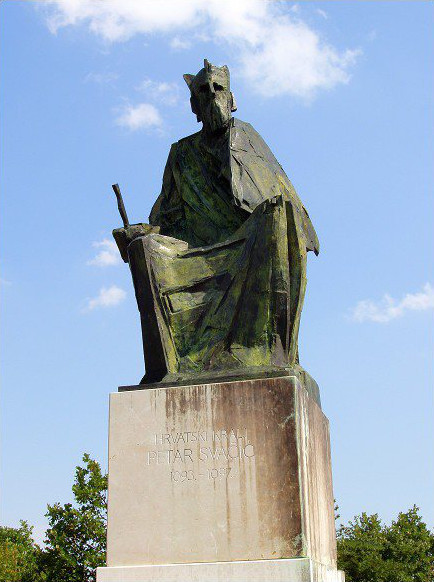
- Monument to Petar Snačić in Miljevci by Kažimir Hraste

Ban of Croatia
- Reign: 1075/1076–c.1089/1091
- Predecessor: Demetrius Zvonimir
- Successor: Ugra

King of Croatia Contested by Ladislaus I
- Reign: 1093–1097
- Predecessor: Stephen II
- Successor: Coloman (in union with Hungary)
- Died: 1097
- House: Snačić
- Religion: Catholicism

Petar, commonly called Petar Svačić or Petar Snačić, was a feudal lord, notable for being one of the claimants of the Croatian throne between c. 1093 and 1097. He came to power in turbulent times after the death of the last Trpimirović, Stephen II. It is assumed that he began as a ban serving under the king Demetrius Zvonimir of Croatia and later (self-)proclaimed as a new king, contesting Ladislaus I of Hungary claim to the throne. Petar's seat of power was in Knin. His rule was marked by a struggle for control of the country with Coloman of Hungary, dying at the Battle of Gvozd Mountain in 1097. Following his death, after Coloman's coronation in Croatia and signing of Pacta conventa (1102), the Árpád dynasty officially ruled over the whole Kingdom of Croatia and Dalmatia.

== Background ==
The only reliable mention of Petar comes from the 13th century Hungarian chronicle Gesta Hunnorum et Hungarorum by Simon of Kéza. Probably ruling only central Croatia, it is unknown whether Petar was crowned king.

A note added in the 14th century to the Supetar Cartulary that a ban during the rule of King Zvonimir was a certain Petar from the Snačić family, is not considered reliable enough to identify King Petar with him. This is, however, usually done thanks to a misinterpretation by historian Franjo Rački, and both the name and identity of King Petar was accepted to be Petar Svačić or Snačić in the historiography and the public.

Ferdo Šišić's identification of Petar with Petar Slaven is also deemed unsuccessful. Petar Slaven was also a Ban of Croatia, son of Rusin and nephew of Slavac, who was also a pretender to the Croatian throne and titled as king, per Supetar Cartulary.

According to Croatian historian Mladen Ančić, all these personalities bearing the name of Petar most probably indicate the same person. Neven Budak considers that Petar was "previously possibly a ban from the genus Snačić".

== Struggle for the succession ==
He assumed the throne amid deep tension throughout the Kingdom. His predecessor, Stephen II (1089–1091) died without leaving an heir, sparking a major political crisis. Jelena or Ilona, the widow of King Dmitar Zvonimir (1074–1089) supported her brother, King Ladislaus I of Hungary, in the inheritance of the throne of Croatia. Croatia was invaded in 1091 by Ladislaus I, encountering opposition only upon reaching the mountain Gvozd, where he successfully engaged in warfare with the local nobility, but only until Northern Dalmatia. Meanwhile, as a part of Croatia's dignitaries and clergy did not support Ladislaus' claim, they elected, or a Croatian nobleman self-proclaimed as a new king, first being dux Simeon, then king Slavac, and lastly king Petar.

Shortly after his army's success, Ladislaus died (1095), leaving his nephew Coloman to continue the campaign. In 1097, Petar departed from Knin to meet Coloman in battle, resulting in Coloman's victory and Petar's death. According to Pacta conventa, whose authenticity is debated, a historic settlement was subsequently reached by which the Croats agreed to recognize Coloman as king. In return, he promised to guarantee Croatia's self-governance under a ban (royal governor), and to respect all the rights, laws and privileges of the Croatian Kingdom. Petar was the last native king of Croatia, and the personal union with Kingdom of Hungary lasted until 1918.

Regnal titles
Preceded by Álmos	King of Croatia; 1093–1097	Succeeded by Coloman
Preceded by Demetrius Zvonimir	Ban of Croatia; 1075/1076–c.1089/1091	Succeeded by Ugra
