= Demetrius Zvonimir =

King of Croatia and Dalmatia from 1075 to 1089

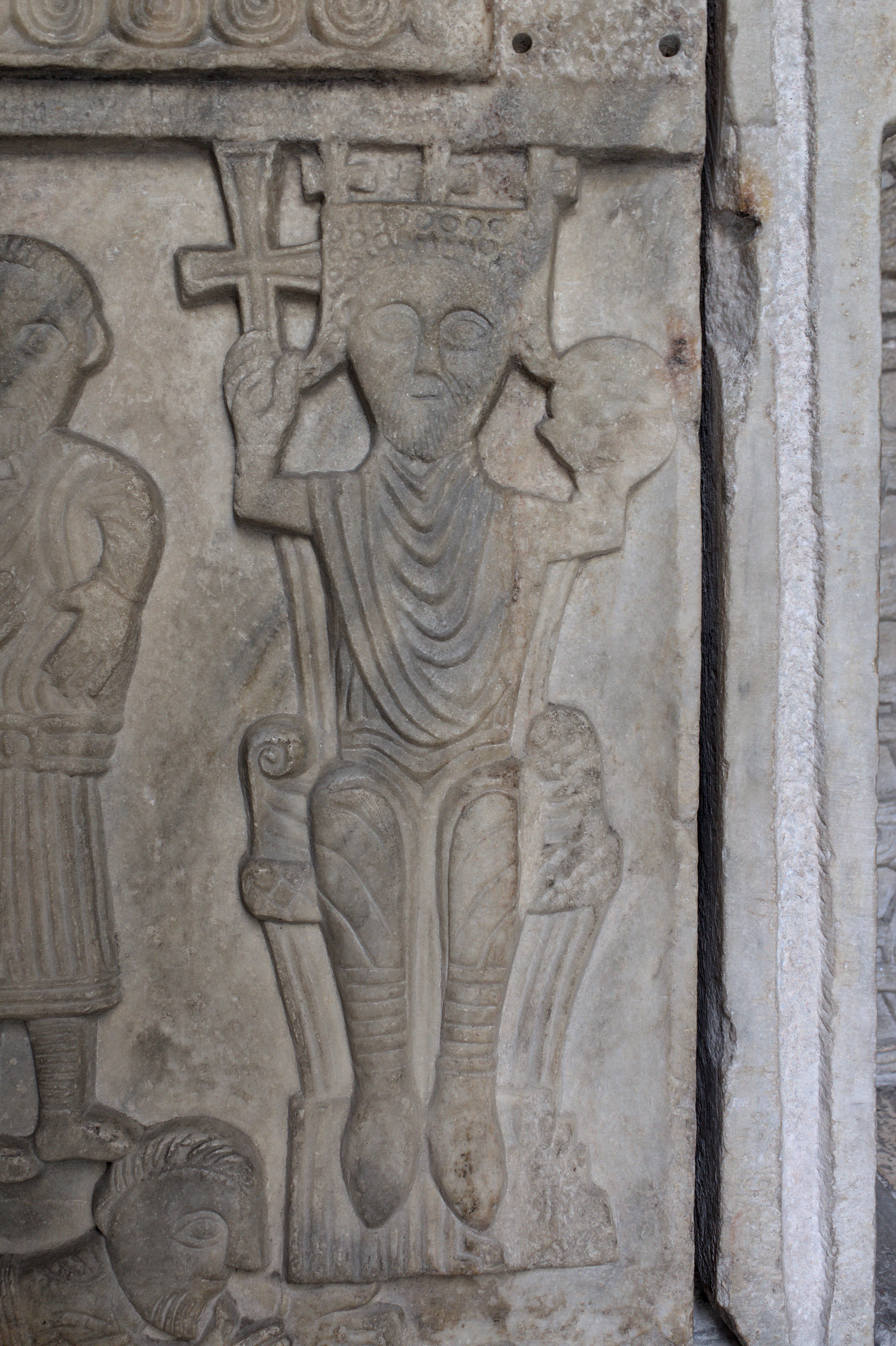
- 11th century depiction of a king, suggested to be Peter Krešimir IV or Demetrius Zvonimir

Ban of Croatia
- Reign: c. 1064/1070 – 1074
- Predecessor: Gojčo
- Successor: Petar Snačić

King of Croatia and Dalmatia
- Reign: 1075/1076–1089
- Coronation: 8/9 October 1075/1076
- Predecessor: Peter Krešimir IV
- Successor: Stephen II
- Died: 1089; Knin, Croatia
- Burial: Church of St. Bartholomew, Knin, Croatia
- Spouse: Helen of Hungary
- Issue: Radovan; Claudia; Vinica
- House: Trpimirović
- Religion: Catholicism

Demetrius Zvonimir (Croatian: Dmitar Zvonimir, pronounced [dmîtar zʋônimiːr]; Old Church Slavonic: ⰸⱏⰲⱏⱀⰻⰿⰻⱃⱏ; died 1089) was a King of Croatia and Dalmatia from 1075 or 1076 until his death in 1089. Prior to that, Zvonimir also served as Ban of Croatia (1064/1070–1074). His native name was Zvonimir, but adopted the forename Demetrius at his coronation.

He first served as ban in the service of King Peter Krešimir IV. Afterwards, Peter Krešimir IV appointed him duke and declared him as his heir. In 1075 or 1076, Demetrius Zvonimir succeeded to the Croatian throne through papal diplomacy. His reign is characterized as relatively peaceful, with no extensive war campaigns, focused instead on Croatia's economic and cultural development. He inherited the Croatian state at its height and ruled from the city of Knin. Medieval legends allege his assassination, but his death and succession are subjects of controversy in historiography. His reign was followed by a period of anarchy, which ended with the ascension of the Hungarian Árpád dynasty and the creation of a union with Hungary.

== Early years ==
Zvonimir's exact origin and background are uncertain. It is believed that he was a member of the native Trpimirović dynasty, and some historians have proposed that he is a descendant of Svetoslav Suronja's son Stjepan Svetoslavić which also allowed for the thesis that he began his career as Ban of Slavonia. Others rejected his Trpimirović descent and argued he was a member of some other prominent Croatian noble family possibly from Sidraga županija, but his early marriage to Árpád's princes shows he must have been of some extraordinary lineage. The historical sources also mention his magistro ("teacher") Scestaki (Šestak), and uncle Strezata (Streza) to whom he allowed tax collection in Mosor and from Solin to Bijaći.

== Ban of Croatia ==
During the reign of King Peter Krešimir IV, his relative also through the Orseoli family of Venice, older generation of historians conjectured that Zvonimir initially administered Slavonia, specifically the land between the rivers Drava and Sava, with the title of ban. The term "Slavonia" (Latin: Sclavonia) at the time referred to both modern day Slavonia and North-West Croatia. However, there's lack of historical evidence that Zvonimir ever held the title of Ban of Slavonia, or ruled over the region.

The neighboring Holy Roman Empire under Henry IV invaded Hungary in 1063 to restore Solomon, husband of his sister, to the Hungarian throne. Hungary was then ruled by Solomon's uncle Béla I, whose third daughter Helen was engaged to Zvonimir. According to Chronicon Pictum, Croatia was also attacked around 1063 by the Carantanian army of Ulric I, who occupied a part of Kvarner and the eastern coast of Istria, the "March of Dalmatia". Since the Croatian king was preoccupied with rebellion in Dalmatia, also due to the prohibition of Slavic liturgy, Zvonimir was compelled to seek protection from then King Solomon instead. Géza I and Solomon helped Zvonimir in restoring authority between 1064 and 1067 in the "March of Dalmatia". After they jointly repelled the Carantanians from Croatia, Zvonimir sent many gold, silver and other valuables to Solomon and Géza I as a sign of gratitude. Shortly afterwards in 1070 Zvonimir is first mentioned as a Ban of Croatia in three charters from Zadar, succeeding Ban Gojčo. Croatian charters at the time were issued in the names of both King Peter Krešimir and Ban Zvonimir.

In March 1074, Normans from southern Italy, led by Count Amico of Giovinazzo, invaded Dalmatia on the invitation of Dalmatian cities and Byzantium. They occupied the cities of Split, Trogir, Biograd na Moru and Zadar, but also managed to capture a certain Croatian king whose name is not mentioned, but certainly meant King Peter Krešimir, who died by November 1074. Norman crisis lasted until February 1075, when Venice expelled Amico and his forces from Dalmatia. Zvonimir probably helped Venice in the process. Although the Venetians freed Dalmatia and parts of Croatia previously occupied by the Normans, with the doge Domenico Selvo even self-titling himself as the doge of Venice, Dalmatia and Croatia (later only of Dalmatia), the Venetians with their close contacts with the Byzantium and Holy Roman Empire were not favourable to the Holy See. In such events the Holy See and Zvonimir came into contact with mutual interest.

Meanwhile, another contender for the throne, Stephen II Trpimirović, who had also been the Duke of Croatia until 1066 under King Petar Krešimir, relinquished his claim and relocated later to the Church of St. Stephen beneath the pines in the vicinity of Split, where he was to live a secluded life. It seems that Zvonimir was chosen as an heir to the throne already during Petar Krešimir's late life.

== Reign as king ==
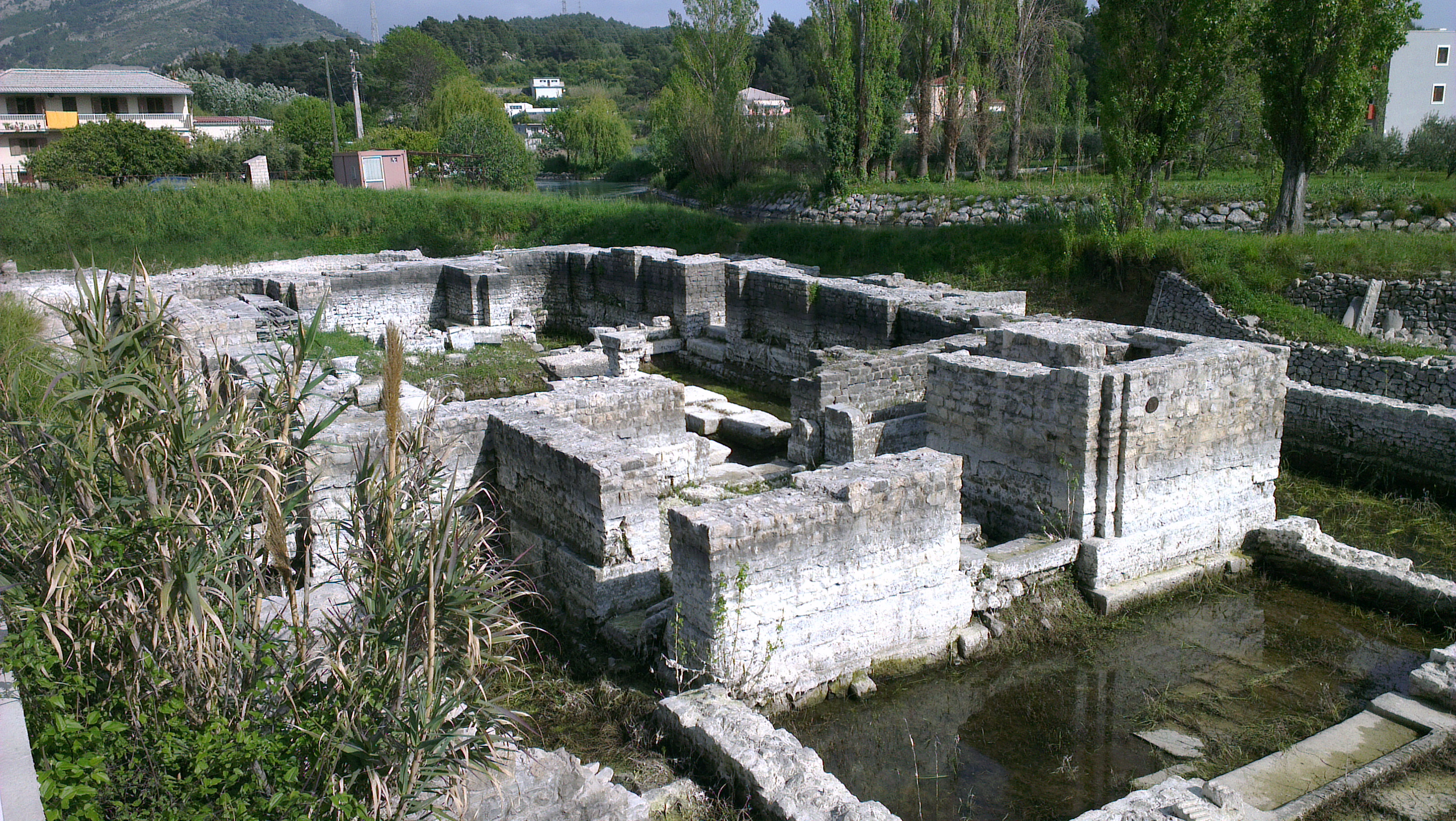
The remains of Basilica of Saint Peter and Moses in Solin, today known as the Hollow Church. This is where Zvonimir's coronation took place.

Zvonimir was crowned with regalia - crown, scepter, sword and flag - in October 1075 or 1076 in the Basilica of Saint Peter and Moses (known today as the Hollow Church) at Salona (today's Solin, Croatia), by Gebizon a representative of Pope Gregory VII (1073–1085). There's a dispute between historians whether he was crowned in 1075 or 1076 due to some dating uncertainties in the coronation charter. The day itself is not mentioned, however it is argued to be 8 or 9 October as on 9 October is St. Demetrius feast day whose name Zvonimir took at the coronation.

He was granted the royal title from the Pope after pledging "Peter's Pence", thus becoming a vassal to the Holy See. During this occasion, he promised defence and care of the churches and monks, poor and orphans, prosecute unlawful marriages between cousins, establish lawful marriages with a ring and priest blessing, and defend such marriages from depravity, also oppose trade of humans. Zvonimir took an oath of fealty to the Pope, promising to support the implementation of the Church reforms in Croatia. He also gave the Benedictine monastery of St. Gregory in Vrana (with two golden crowns with gems, probably being the previous Croatian crowns received by Byzantines) to the Holy See, both as a sign of loyalty and as accommodation for papal legates visiting Croatia. The title of Zvonimir continued to be "King of Croatia and Dalmatia" (Latin: Rex Chroatie atque Dalmatie), while his name and title in Croatian, as found on the Baška tablet, was "Zvonimir, kral hrvatski" (English: Zvonimir, Croatian king), in Glagolitic script zvъnъmirъ, kralъ xrъvatъskъ.

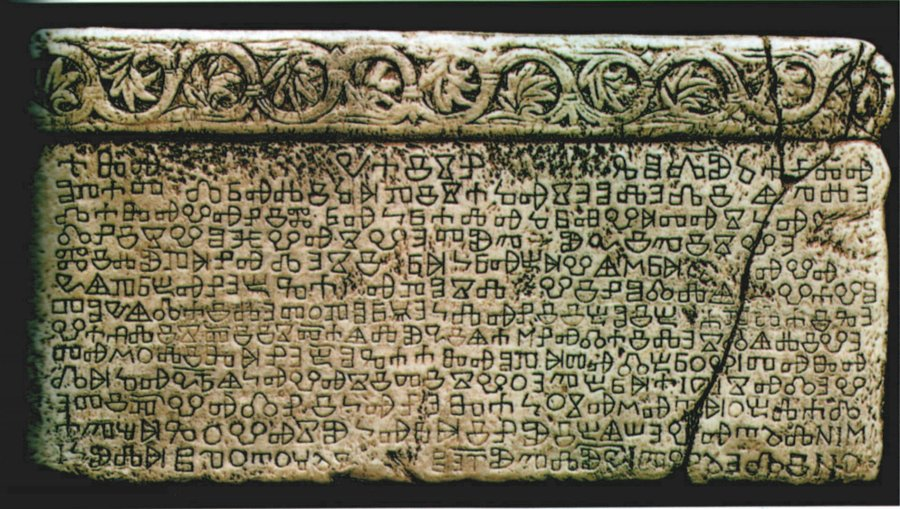
The Baška tablet is the oldest Glagolitic monument in Croatia. It documents the donation of land gifted by king Zvonimir to the Benedictine Church of St. Lucy, Jurandvor, Krk.

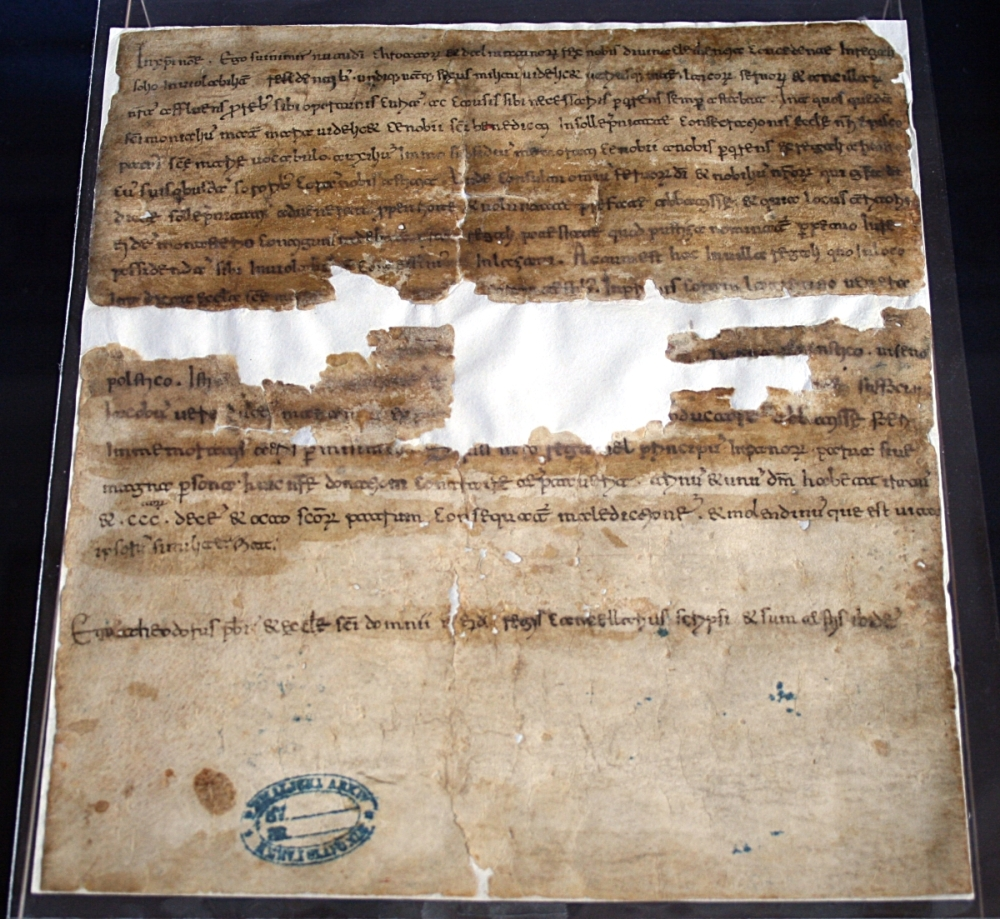
Grant of Zvonimir to the monastery of the abbess of St. Benedict in Split for land Pustica in Lažani, 1076–1078.

Zvonimir's coronation signified the end of political and religious relations between Croatia and Byzantine Empire, but also the end of complete independence because the kingdom became a vassal of the Holy See. Following the coronation, the papal legates summoned a church council in Split, which reiterated the king on the use of Slavic in liturgy and the condemnation of the Glagolitic or Cyrillic alphabet, which the council of 1060 had branded as heresy. The king instituted the Gregorian reform; he also promised the eventual abolition of slavery, but with little success (see Supetar cartulary). He maintained authority over Dalmatia, which could be felt as far as the distant town of Osor on the island of Cres, where he is referenced in a 1082 lauda.

Demetrius Zvonimir sought to gain firmer control of his kingdom by ousting various local nobles (hereditary provincial leaders and landlords) from local administration and replacing them with his own supporters, court nobles and, reflecting his close papal ties, high clerics. The provincial nobles were governing their provinces (županije) with a significant level of internal independence. In 1080, he bethrothed his daughter Claudia to the noble Vniha of the Lapčani tribe, to whom he also granted the county (županija) of Karin in Dalmatia as a dowry.

Around 1079, tensions arose between Croatia and the neighboring Holy Roman Empire, whose duke Vecelin (a servant of emperor Henry IV) was preparing for an attack on Croatia from his estates in Istria. The pope intervened on behalf of Zvonimir, under threat of excommunication, urging Vecelin to make any complaint to him directly regarding any issues with the king. The Annales Carinthiæ and Chronica Hungarorum record that Zvonimir eventually invaded Carinthia to aid Hungary in war between 1079 and 1083, but this is disputed. Demetrius Zvonimir also took a hard line against Byzantium. After Robert Guiscard the Duke of Apulia reconciled with the Pope, a military alliance was formed against the new Byzantine emperor Alexios I Komnenos. Zvonimir, due to his pledge to the Holy See, sent naval troops to the aid of the Norman invasion in the 1080s. During these years, Zvonimir's vicar and deputy over Dalmatian cities was Pribimir.

== Death and succession ==
Kingdom of Croatia and Dalmatia during Zvonimir's reign, at the beginning of 1089.

There are several versions of Zvonimir's date and circumstances of death. The last known document while alive is dated to 8 October 1087. The 13th century chronicler Thomas the Archdeacon in his Historia Salonitana, and a charter of king Stephen II from 8 September 1089 (said to have been issued closely after the death of king Zvonimir), both indicate that Zvonimir died of natural causes. This view had been mostly accepted in the historiography since the 16th century, but some historians like Ferdo Šišić and archaeologist Stjepan Gunjača argued in favor of a documented violent death. Various later sources give the date 20 April as the date of his death. They also name the village of Kosovo (today's Biskupija near Knin) with five churches and the place by the basilica of Saint Cecillia at Petrovo/Kosovo Polje as the place of death. These sources were typically associated with the allegations of his assassination, which by now is often believed to be a medieval legend. It is argued that his resting place moved between the Cathedral of Saint Bartholomew in Kapitul near Knin and Church of St. Stephen at Salona (today's Solin) where was the Mausoleum of Croatian Kings.

Demetrius Zvonimir was married to his distant relative Jelena, the sister of Ladislaus I of Hungary. Through Helen, he was connected to the royal families of not only Hungary, but also Poland, Denmark, Bulgaria, and Byzantium. They had a son, Radovan, who predeceased Zvonimir, and two daughters, Vinica and Claudia, the latter married to the voivode Vniha Lapčan. Since Zvonimir died without leaving an heir from his posterity, he was succeeded by Stephen II, last of the Trpimirović dynasty. Stephen II ruled briefly until his death in 1091.

According to the chronicles and historical documents, Croatia subsequently entered a period of 10 years of anarchy without social authority, with various sides and nobles fighting over supremacy in the kingdom. The chronicles subsequently narrate two separate stories that, or some Sclavonian-White Croatian noblemen (sometimes named as Petar Gusić and Petar de genere Cacautonem/Chuchanorum identified with Kukari) went to Hungary and invited Ladislaus to seize the Croatian Kingdom, or widow Jelena had requested her brother Ladislaus to intervene and conquer the kingdom. In reality probably happened both scenarios, with widow Jelena seizing some power and receiving support from a small part of Croatian nobility (Lapčani, Gusići and Kukari among others) which eased Ladislaus's intervention.

Historical documents show that Ladislaus by the end of 1091 conquered a big part of Slavonia i.e. Croatia placing his nephew Prince Álmos as "Duke of Croatia", however, there also emerged Croatian noblemen who showed resistance. First were a dux Simeon, and certain Slavac from Split who appropriated the royal title, his brothers had estates between Split and Omiš, brother Rusin even during the Zvonimir's reign was dux Marianorum and Morsticus, while Rusin's son Petar was Ban of Croatia. Evidence that Ladislaus and Álmos did not consolidate power over whole Croatia, but mainly only those regions North of Sava river and maybe up to Ravni Kotari west of river Krka in Dalmatia and without Kvarner in the westernmost part of the kingdom, is that they influenced the religious organization only in Zagreb and Eastern Slavonia (1094). The written experiences of Raymond of Aguilers during the First Crusade in late 1096 show that in the country called Sclavonia and Dalmatia could not find any authority to agree the terms of passage and relations with the people, and there is no mention of Hungarian king on the Baška tablet. When in 1095 Ladislaus died, the throne was contested between previously Ban now "king" Petar who ruled from Knin, identified as Petar Snačić, and Hungarian king Coloman, who fought at the Battle of Gvozd Mountain (1097), followed by Coloman's supposed signing of Pacta Conventa and recorded coronation in 1102 at Biograd na Moru. Prior to this Venetian doge also showed interest for Dalmatia and Croatia, which ended in agreement of 1098—the so-called Conventio Amicitiae—determined the spheres of interest of each party by allotting the coastal regions of Croatia to Hungary and Dalmatia to the Republic of Venice, but Coloman in 1105 successfully conquered coastal cities of Dalmatia.

== Legacy ==
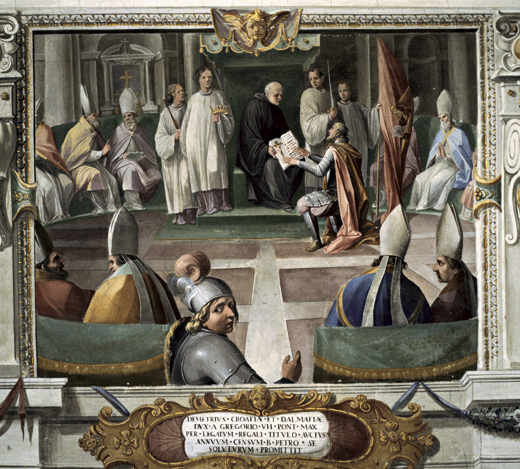
The Oath of Zvonimir, Vatican fresco from 1611.

Demetrius Zvonimir is viewed in contemporary Croatia as the last native king who held any real power and is regarded as one of the national heroes from the medieval period. The untimely death of his son, Radovan, and the short reign of Stephen II plunged Croatia resulted in a union with Hungary lasting until 1918.

The culturally and historically significant Baška tablet was inscribed shortly after his death and contains references to him and a number of his nobles of the 11th century. For the first time, the Baška tablet mentions the title of Croatian kings in Croatian: kral (kralj in modern Croatian). His name is also contained in the 11th or 12th-century Jurandvor fragments from the same church in Baška, on the island of Krk, and six written documents from the 12th century about various estates which were gifted by Zvonimir.

=== Legend about death ===
There are preserved several variations of the legend of his often violent death. These variations commonly refer to Zvonimir as the last Croatian king without any mention of Stephen II, and show Zvonimir and his rule in a very positive light. Zvonimir is portrayed as a good, heartful, soulful, faithful, holy king and defender of the Christian faith, while his reign is a serene, fair and rich time for the kingdom and people. The myth of the "Curse of King Zvonimir" according to which Zvonimir cursed the Croats to never again have a lord of their native language/nation yet to forever serve one of a foreign language/nation, which happened for almost a thousand years, is based on the legend of his assassination.

However, the account of assassination by the hands of Croats, which is reminiscent of and compared in the historical sources to the Jewish sin of killing Jesus, is argued by Ivo Goldstein to be historiographically impossible, without precedent in medieval Europe and contradictory to the overwhelming medieval fanaticism about Christianity and in favour of the crusades. Also, the First Crusade happened several years after Zvonimir's death, and there's no evidence that the Pope or others before Council of Clermont (1095) were taking active measures at European royal courts. The negative experience of Croats with the First and later Crusaders possibly remained in memory and influenced the content of the legend.

Further proof of Zvonimir's death by natural causes is the lack of any initiative by the Holy See or others for him to be declared a martyr and saint. Ivo Goldstein argues that Zvonimir, the last historically notable Croatian king, was combined with his less known successors Stephen II and Petar Snačić who lived closer to the time of First Crusade; for example his violent death was derived from the death of Petar Snačić. The praise of the ruler and his relation to faith, killing and comparison to the Jews are arguably inspired by the legend of St. Wenceslaus of Bohemia, which was popular in Glagolitic literature. The anti-Hungarian and pro-Papal sentiment from the Croatian perspective might be the result of the 14th-15th century Hungarian centralisation and dynastic struggle in which Croatian nobles mostly supported the Capetian House of Anjou. The idea that the legend emerged in the 15th century around the time of Ottoman invasion threats is unlikely. The legend and cult of Zvonimir lived and influenced even the 1527 election in Cetin, in which a charter stated, "after the death of our last king, named Zvonimir, with free will we joined the holy crown of the Hungarian Kingdom".

A 13th–14th century Polish–Hungarian Chronicle is possibly the earliest source to allege his murder. One of its chapters tells a mythological story transcending time periods of how King Akvila (Attila) was ordered by Jesus Christ to avenge the treason and murder of King Kazimir (Zvonimir) who was chosen by Christ to rule, which was not accepted by the people who wanted to rule by themselves. Akvila successfully fought for eight days the nobles of the kingdom of Croatia and Slavonia, with many Slavs and Croats dead, and decided to come to Slavonia and marry a Croatian woman. The story itself justifies by God's will Ladislaus' conquest of Croatia as Zvonimir's avenger. According to Mladen Ančić, the legend which the author of the chronicle re-edited, came to the Polish court with Katarina Šubić who married in 1326 Bolesław III the Generous.

Another account, from the 14-15th century Croatian redaction/The Croatian Chronicle of the 13th century Chronicle of the Priest of Duklja, says that in 1079 (evidence that the anonymous author or copyist mistook Glagolitic letter meaning 80 with Cyrillic meaning 70), desiring to heal the East-West Schism Pope Urban II asked Zvonimir, his strongest ally in the Eastern Adriatic, to go on a Crusade to liberate Christ's grave. Zvonimir convened the Sabor at a place called "five churches in Kosovo", which had been successfully identified by the archaeologists as Biskupija near Knin. The intention was to mobilize the army on behalf of the Roman pope and the emperor, but the nobility refused, unwilling to go far away from their homeland, wives and children. A rebellion erupted, leading to Zvonimir's assassination at the hands of his own subjects. It was the king Béla I of Hungary who avenged his death and conquered the Kingdom of Croatia (which reportedly included "Bosnam, Croatiam, Delmatiam, Naronam").

In the 14th century Chronicon Pictum, there's no mention of violent death, but it is stated that when Zolomer (Zvonimir) died without children, his wife was persecuted by many of her husband's enemies and asked help from her brother Ladislaus, who avenged the injustices and gave her back Croatia and Dalmatia, later inheriting them by royal right. The same account is repeated in Chronica Hungarorum (15th century) and Rerum Ungaricum decades (15–16th century).

The Historia Salonitana already mentions Zvonimir's natural death, but in its 14th century (some consider it was a 13th-century) addition known as maior there is a story which is a combination of the Croatian redaction of the Chronicle of the Priest of Duklja and Hungarian chronicles. It tells that in 1100 Zvonimir/Suonemir, called Zolomer in the text, ordered his nobles and knights to gather at the place of five churches at Kosovo and there read them the pope's and emperor's letters which ordered to travel with his army over the sea to free Christ's grave. The enraged nobles and knights, thinking that it would be done with the king's consent, killed him. He was childless in his marriage with the daughter of Béla I, and she called for help from her brother Ladislaus. Ladislaus with his army conquered first from river Drava until the Iron Mountain (Mala Kapela), and then from there many castles until the coast. After his victory, he gave the kingdom to his sister, and to honor the memory of King Zvonimir an epitaph was added to his grave:

Who could refrain the people, not to sigh,
when they watch this grave, truly worthy of sorrow?
Because in this darkness a bright star rests,
with sublime ancestry. How it oddly numbs!
Since its barbarous death can only be explained by cursing,
with dark crime of wicked folk,
where their fury relents until the heart eases
and with murder they take down the king,
very healthy, with much power,
the pious Zvonimir, distinctly fair and honest,
who was their shield against enemies,
used to crush the rival doors,
mourn, champions, already a leader plies,
old and young of Croatian land,
because what was first divination of the kingdom
and also honour and glory, is now in ruins.

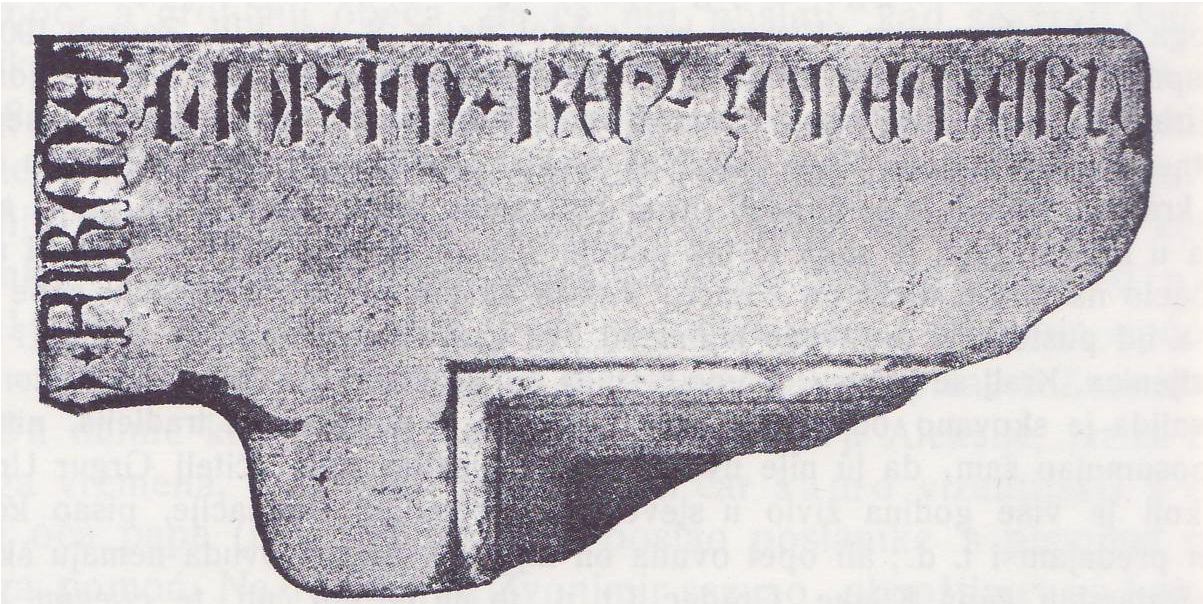
14th-15th century inscription of Zvonimir (Firma Quorum Rex Zonemerius), found at the location of Ostrovica Fortress, Ostrovica, Croatia.

The epitaph was written in a vagant's style which was used only in the 14th century and around the city of Trogir. It is very similar to the grave epitaph of Mladen III Šubić (d. 1348) at the Trogir Cathedral, showing almost the same authorship and dating. There were found fragments mentioning King Zvonimir in the church of St. Mary in Bribir and St. Anthony the Great in nearby Ostrovica, both owned by the Šubić family, and in a letter of Paul I (d. 1312) and George I Šubić (d. 1302) to Pope Boniface VIII, saying that Croatia since the time of king Zvonimir was vassal property of the Holy See hence nobody can be the king of Croatia and Dalmatia as well Hungary without Pope's confirmation. According to one theory, the legend is related to the Šubić family tradition and political propaganda, possibly with the final intention of becoming a new royal dynasty. They possibly had genealogical relations with one of Zvonimir's daughters, were very protective of the Church and had good relations with various knight orders related to the Crusades, and Zvonimir's sudden death and curse was influenced by the destines of Mladen II who was imprisoned and died in Hungary and sudden death of Mladen III who was the last Croatian medieval nobleman with significant power and independence willing to challenge the Hungarian royal authority.

The Anonymous chronicle of Split, dated to the 14th-16th century, tells how the French and Hungarian king led a crusade against the Saracens in 1092 and invited Zvonimir, who called for a gathering of Croatian nobles at the Petrovo Polje. After three months of nobles excusing themselves for lack of finances and maritime skills, Zvonimir invited them to go with the Hungarian king by land. The nobles, angered, attacked the king and mortally wounded him. Zvonimir called the notary Simon and in front of the bishop of Knin and others made a testimony – his two daughters were given in trust to nobleman Snazach (Snačić) and the Croatian kingdom to Hungary by accepting their king as his son. He was buried in the monastery of St. Mary in Bribir.

Ivan Tomašić's Chronicon breve Regni Croatiae from around 1561, in an otherwise identical account to the others (but naming Zvonimir in Hungarian-style Zorobel and dating it to the year 1057), names the assassin as the king's personal secretary and chaplain Tadija Slovinac, who entered the king's tent located by the Basilica of Saint Cecillia in Petrovo polje and killed him in his sleep upon the insistence of the population who did not want to go to war to a land faraway from their homeland, wives and children. Tomašić also records that his remains were located in the Church of Saint Bartholomew in Kapitul in the outskirts of Knin.

The Catalogus ducem et regum Dalmatie et Croatie from Trogir's archive includes a combination of legend and history, saying that Zvonimir died in 1087, while Zvonimir II also known as Stjepan II, son of Trebeli, held the rulership with the support of the nobles, but in 1096 after sending troops from the župa of Krbava into holy war he was murdered near Knin. Crowned with martyrdom, he was the one who prophesied that the Croats would be ruled by the Hungarians, while the Bosnians and Narentines by their own duke.

=== Modern ===
"Zvonimir" is today a traditional and quite common Croatian name, meaning "sound, chime" (zvoni) and "peace, prestige" (mir), King Zvonimir being the first recorded bearer of the name.

After him were named awards to high-ranking officials in both the 1940s Independent State of Croatia (Order of the Crown of King Zvonimir, Medal of the Crown of King Zvonimir) and since the 1990s Republic of Croatia (Grand Order of King Dmitar Zvonimir). The Croatian Navy's flagship and its most modern ship, Kralj Dmitar Zvonimir (RTOP-12), was also named after the late king. Streets, parks and schools in Croatia are named after him as well.

==== Gallery ====
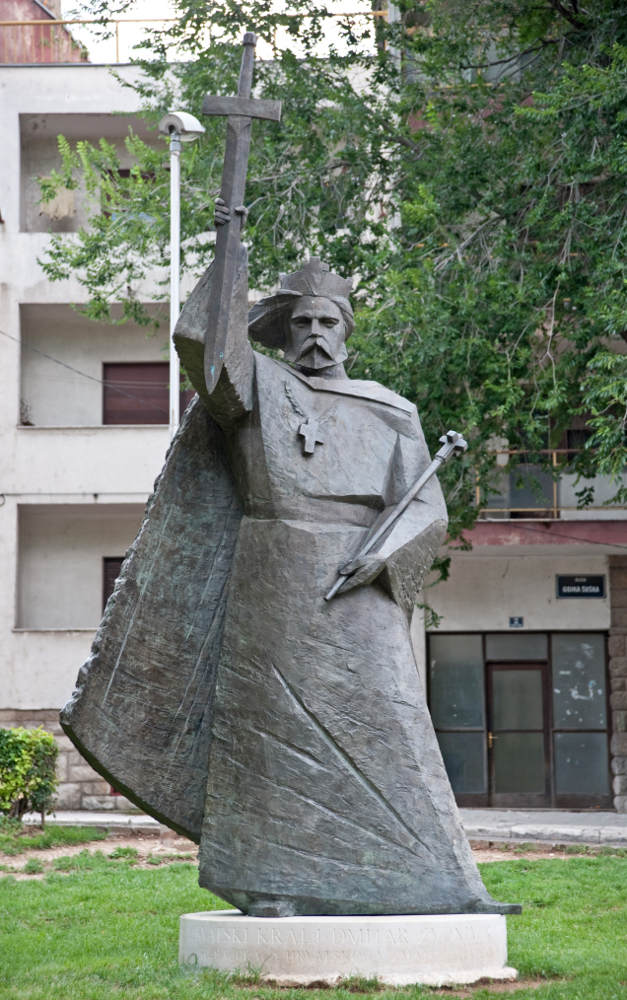
Monument in Knin

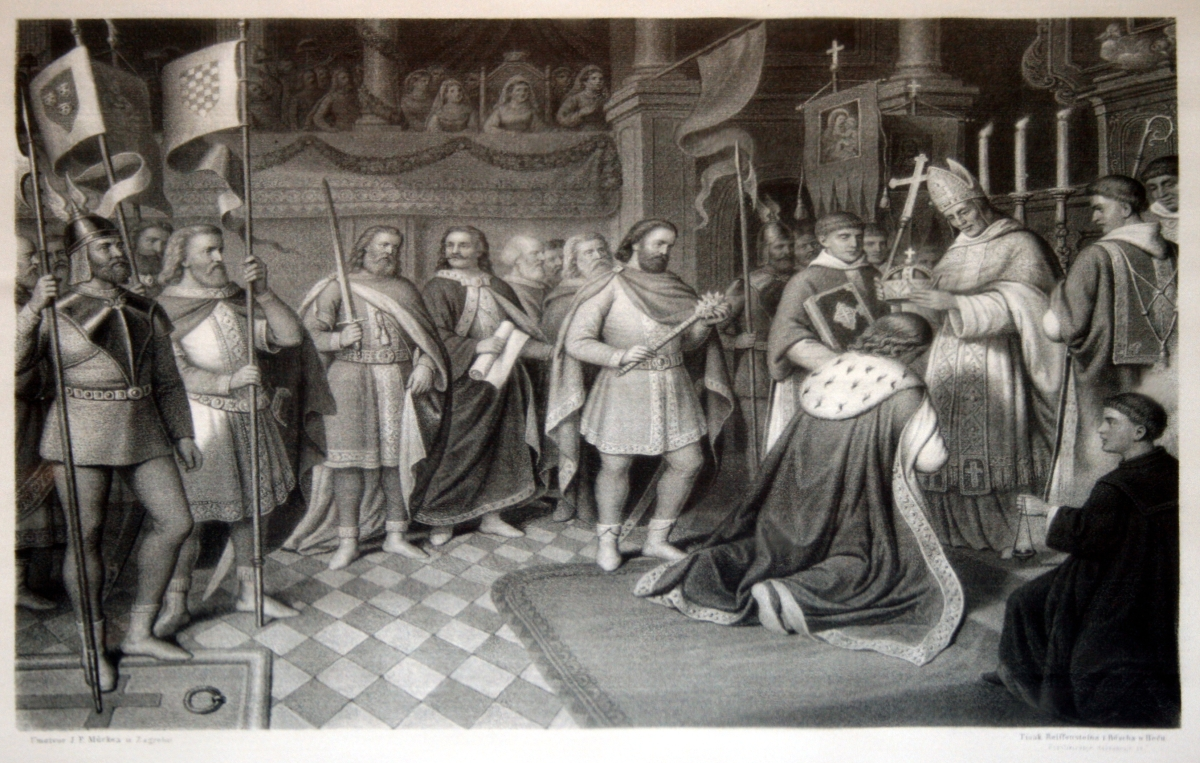
Engraving by J.F. Mücke, Reiffenstein & Röch, 1868

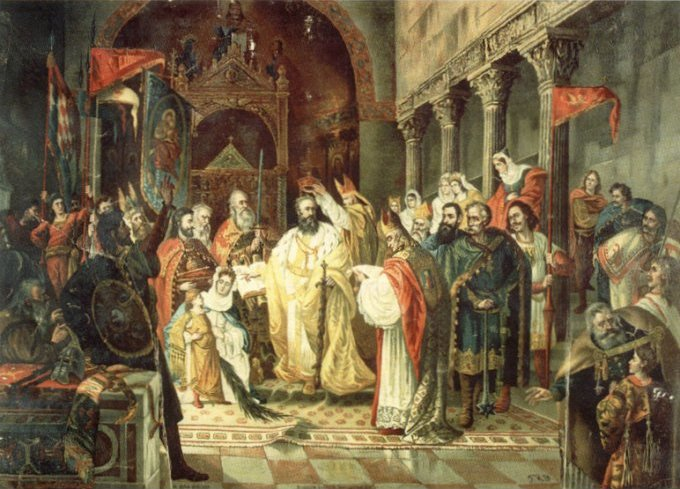
Coronation of Zvonimir by Ferdo Quiquerez, 1897

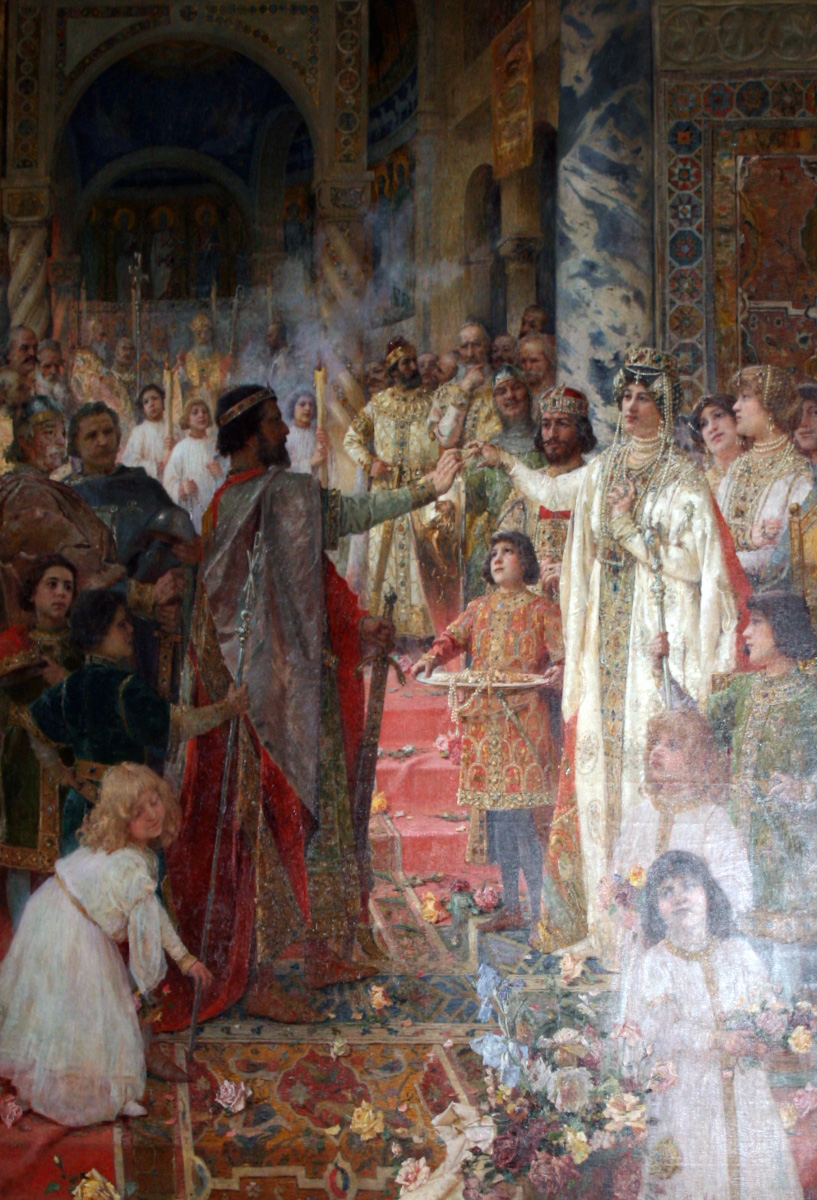
Zvonimir's vows by Celestin Medović

== Family ==
In c. 1063 Zvonimir married Helen, daughter of Béla I of Hungary and his wife Richeza of Poland. They had at least two children:

- Radovan (c. 1065 – 1083/1089), designated heir, but died before 1089
- Claudia, wife of Vniha, voivode of the Lapčan family, who received lands in Karin, Dalmatia, as her dowry.

== See also ==
- Crown of Zvonimir
- List of rulers of Croatia

== Literature ==
- Ančić, Mladen (2002). "Od kralja "poluboga" do prvih ideja o "nacionalnom kraljevstvu"" [From the "Demigod" King to the First Ideas About a "National Kingdom"]. Kolomanov put (katalog izložbe). Zagreb: Hrvatski povijesni muzej. pp. 42–111.
- Budak, Neven (1994). Prva stoljeća Hrvatske (PDF). Zagreb: Hrvatska sveučilišna naklada. ISBN 953-169-032-4. Archived from the original (PDF) on 4 May 2019.
- Budak, Neven (2018). Hrvatska povijest od 550. do 1100 [Croatian history from 550 until 1100]. Leykam international. ISBN 978-953-340-061-7. Archived from the original on 3 October 2022.
- Goldstein, Ivo (1984). "Kako, kada i zašto je nastala legenda o nasilnoj smrti kralja Zvonimira? (Prinos proučavanju mehanizma nastajanja legendi u hrvatskom srednjovjekovnom društvu)". Radovi. 17 (1). Zagreb: 35–54.
- Gunjača, Stjepan (1973–1978). Ispravci i dopune u starijoj hrvatskoj historiji, Zagreb, Školska knjiga
- Nemet, Dražen (2006). "Smrt hrvatskoga kralja Zvonimira - problem, izvori i tumačenja" [Death of Croatian king Zvonimir – problem, sources and interpretation]. Radovi. 38. Zagreb: 73–91.
- Zekan, Mate (1990). Kralj Zvonimir – dokumenti i spomenici (katalog izložbe) [King Zvonimir – Documents and Monuments] (in Croatian and English). Zagreb: Muzej hrvatskih arheoloških spomenika Split, arheološki muzej Zagreb.
- John Van Antwerp Fine (1991). The Early Medieval Balkans: A Critical Survey from the Sixth to the Late Twelfth Century, University of Michigan Press
- Florin Curta (2006). Southeastern Europe in the Middle Ages, 500–1250, Cambridge University Press
- Kowalski, Wawrzyniec (2021), "Excursus: the Croatian Text of The Chronicle of the Priest of Duklja on the Death of King Zvonimir", The Kings of the Slavs: The Image of a Ruler in the Latin Text of The Chronicle of the Priest of Duklja, Brill, pp. 288–308, doi:10.1163/9789004447639_008, ISBN 9789004447639

Demetrius Zvonimir House of Trpimirović Died: 20 April 1089
Preceded by Peter Krešimir IV	King of Croatia; 1075/76–1089	Succeeded by Stephen II
Preceded by Gojčo	Ban of Croatia c.1064/1070–1074	Succeeded by Petar Snačić
