= Medal of the Crown of King Zvonimir =

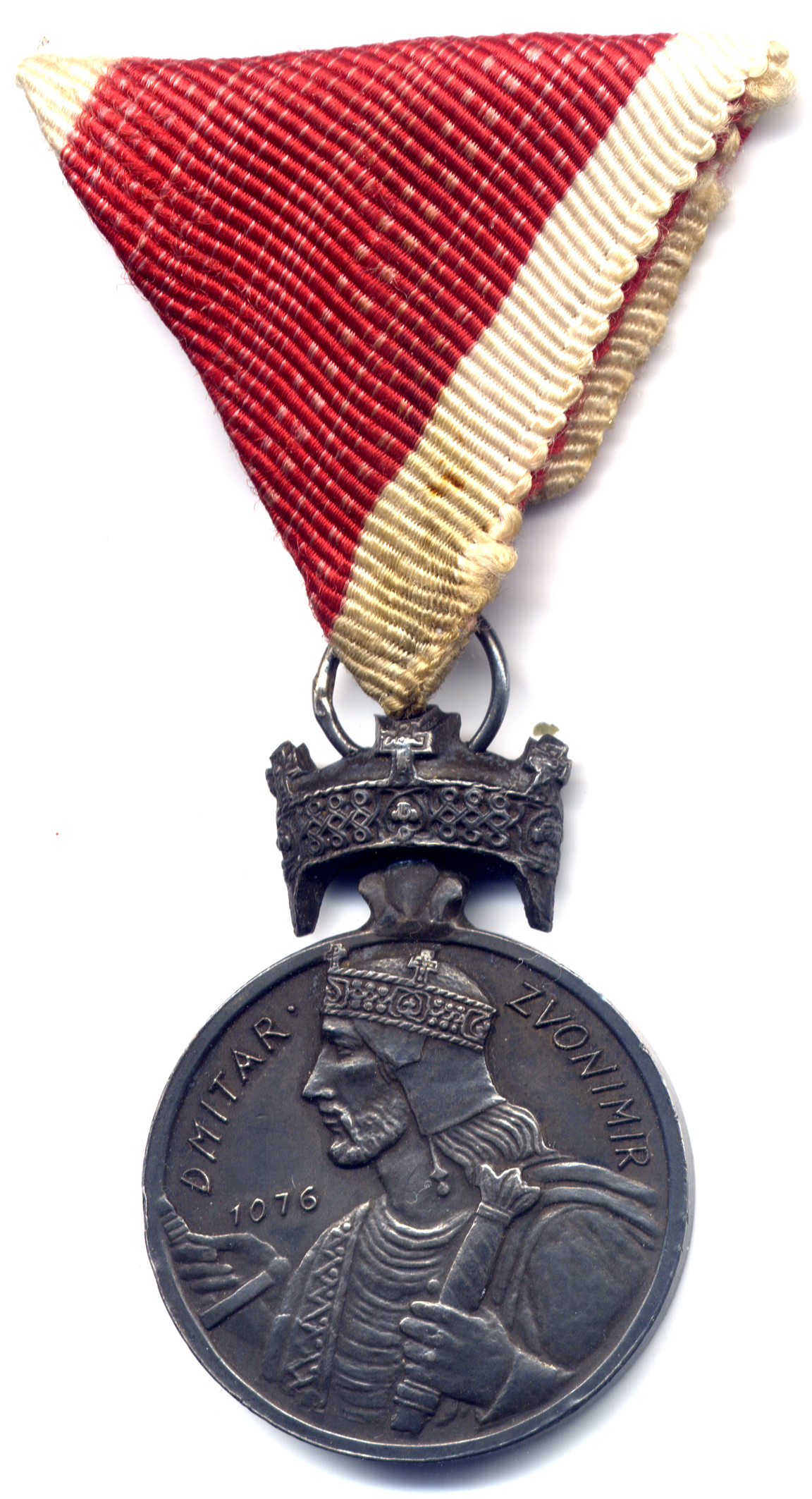
- Silver Medal of the Crown of King Zvonimir
- Type: Medal
- Awarded for: "Merits done, in peace or in war, for Croatian people and Independent State of Croatia"
- Presented by: Independent State of Croatia
- Eligibility: Civilians and Military Personnel
- Status: Discontinued
- Established: 27 December 1941

Highlights
- Total recipients: Kurt Waldheim Tomislav II

Precedence
- Next (higher): Order of the Crown of King Zvonimir

The Medal of the Crown of King Zvonimir (Croatian: Kolajna krune Kralja Zvonimira) was a decoration for military and civil achievements that benefit the Croatian people and the Independent State of Croatia. Croatian sculptor Ivo Kerdić created the medal, which has three grades: silver, bronze, and iron. It is named after King Demetrius Zvonimir of Croatia, who ruled during the 11th century and was known for being loyal to the Pope. The medal has two issues: Civil and Military. The Civil Issue has a white ribbon with red edges, while the Military Issue has a red ribbon with white edges. Decorations with oak leaves on the obverse signify acts of gallantry in action. The medal was awarded until May 1945, and was given to several Germans as well as Croatian nationals fighting on the Eastern Front and in the Balkans campaign.

== Sources ==
- Hrvatska odlikovanja (mr. sc. Stjepan Adanić, general-bojnik Krešimir Kašpar, prof. Boris Prister, prof. Ivan Ružić)

== Recipients ==
- Kurt Waldheim
- Mato Dukovac
- Tomislav II

== See also ==
- Crown of Zvonimir
