= Sustipan =

Peninsula in Split

Coordinates: 43.501°N 16.425°E

Sustipan (lit. Saint Stephen) is a small peninsula located in the southwestern part of Split. In Middle Ages there was a Benedictine monastery and a church. In the 19th century one of the most beautiful cemeteries of the whole Croatia was built in Sustipan. The cemetery was removed in the 20th century by the Communist authorities, the reason why they did that was never found.

Today, there is a forest park for walking.

== Image gallery ==
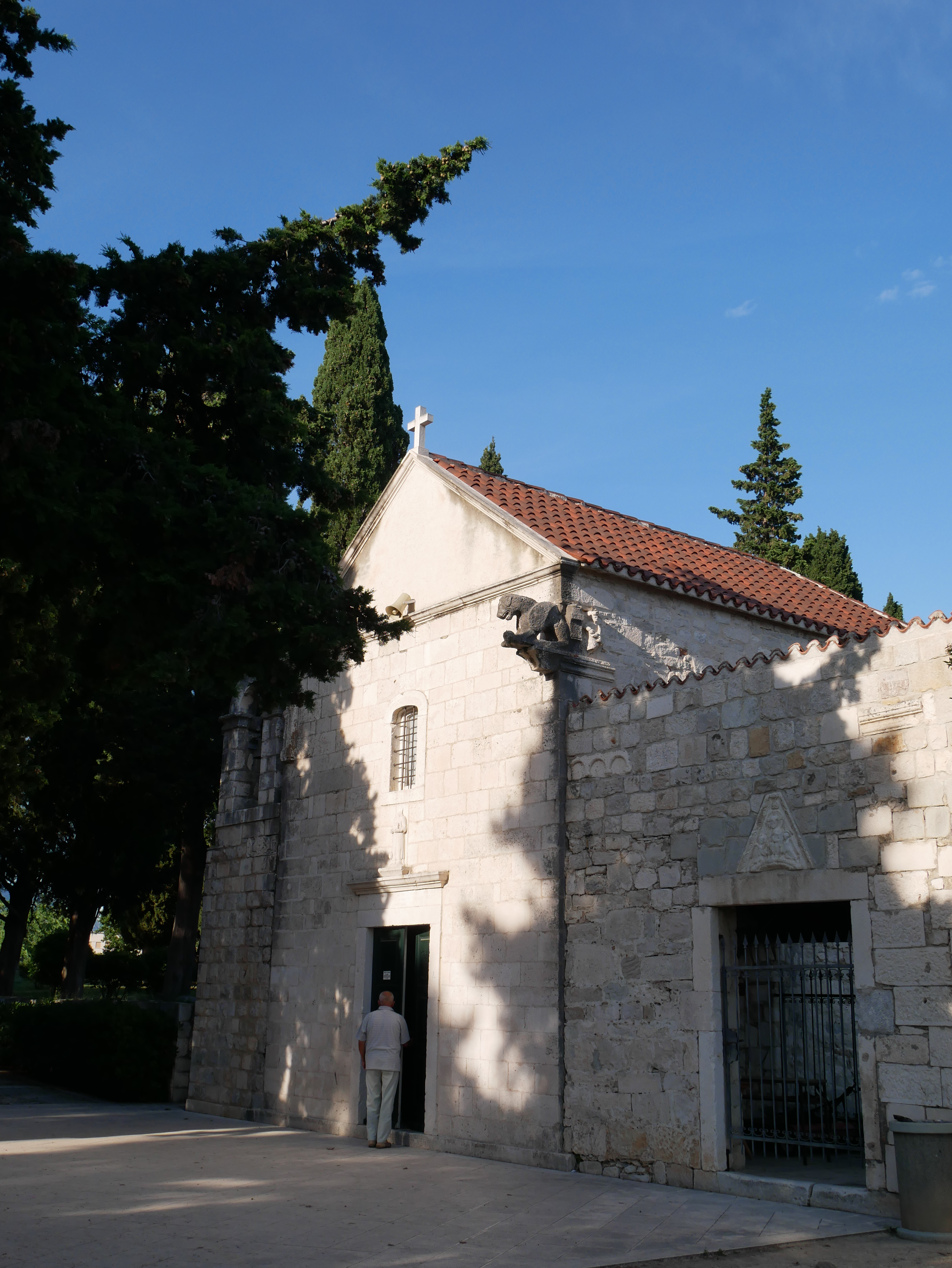
Church on Sustipan

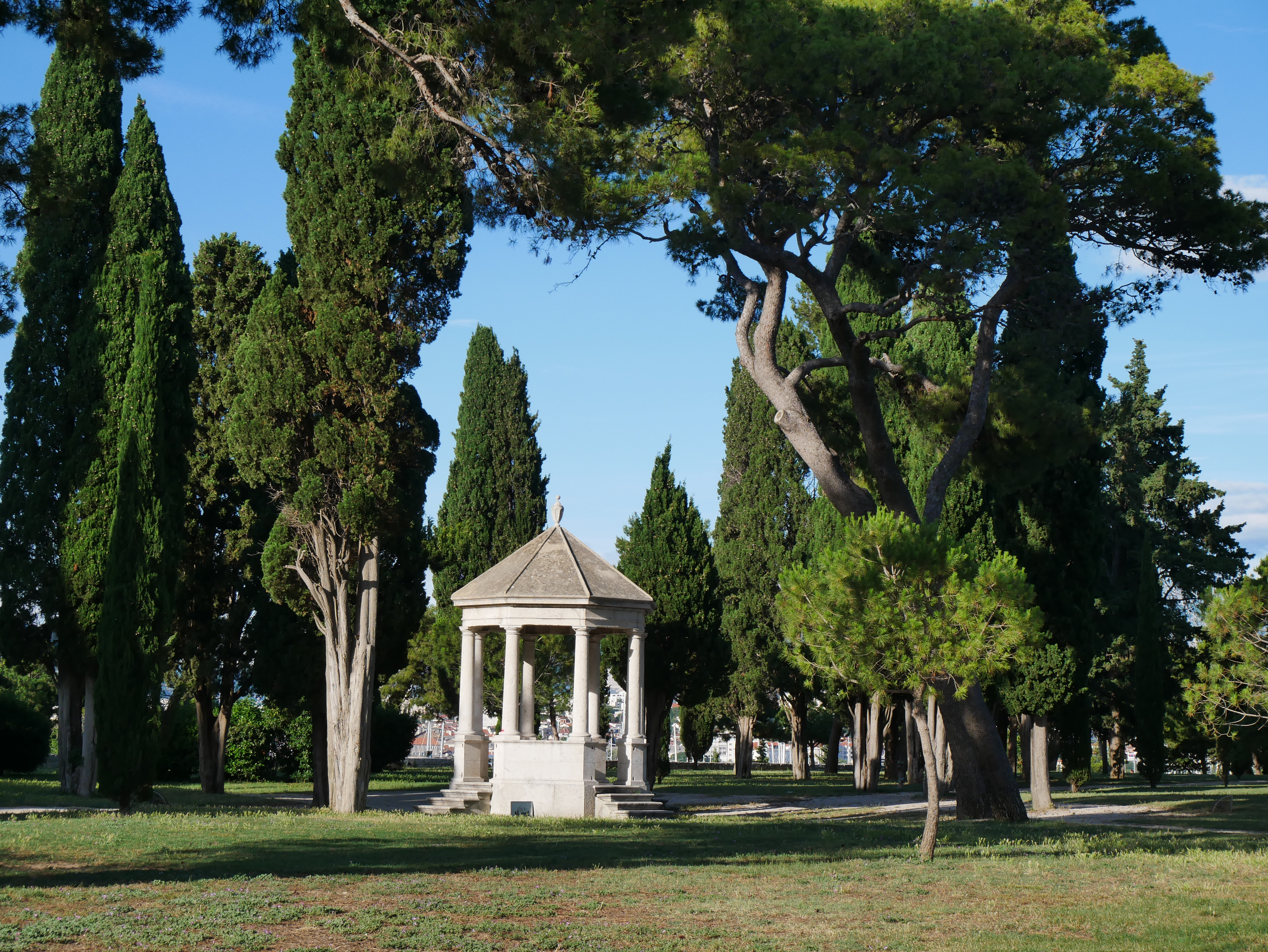
Pavilion on Sustipan - the remains of the cemetery

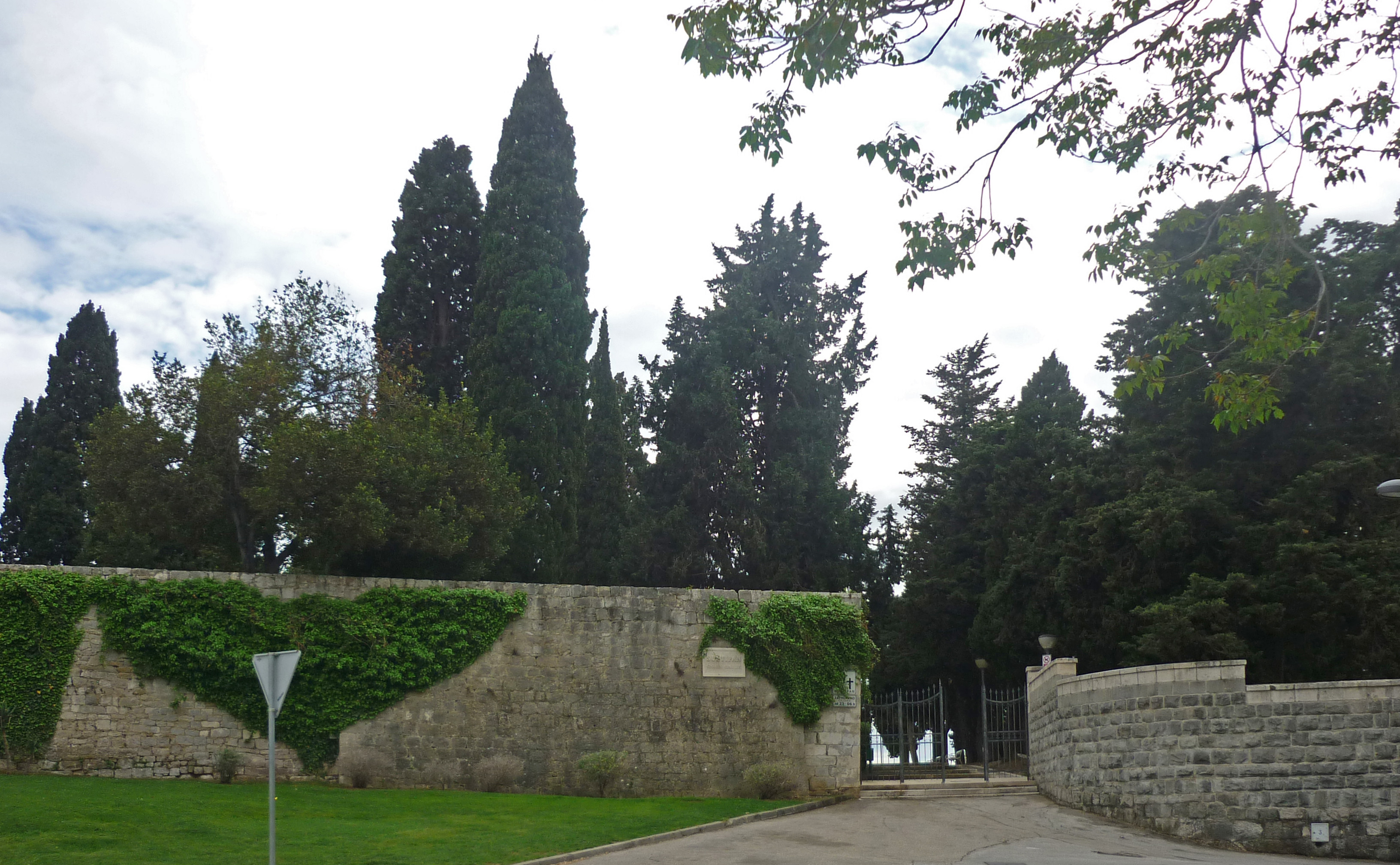
Entrance to the park

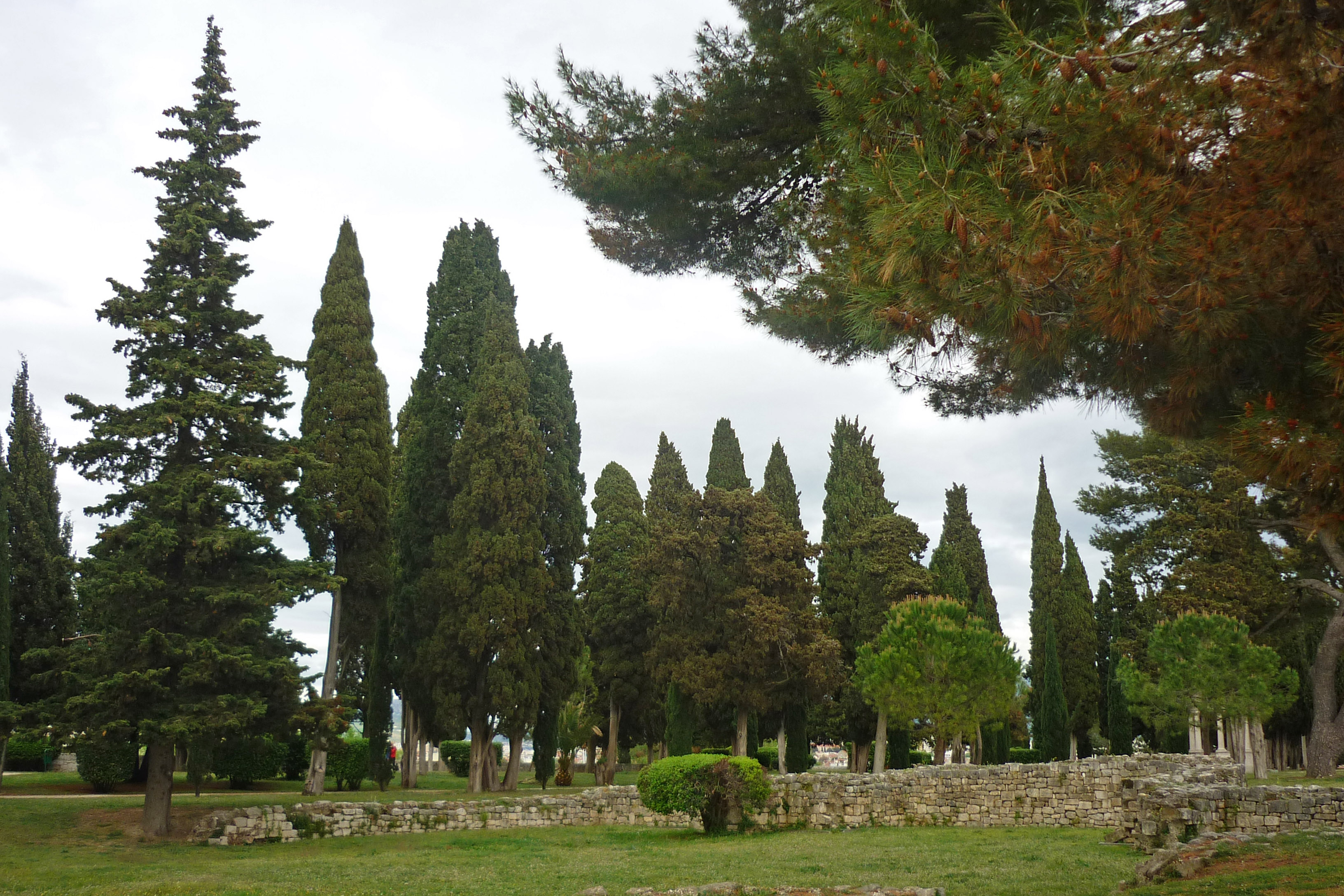
Forest park
