= Battle of Gvozd Mountain =

11th-century battle in Croatia

Coordinates: 44°54′N 15°31′E

- Part of the War of the Croatian Succession
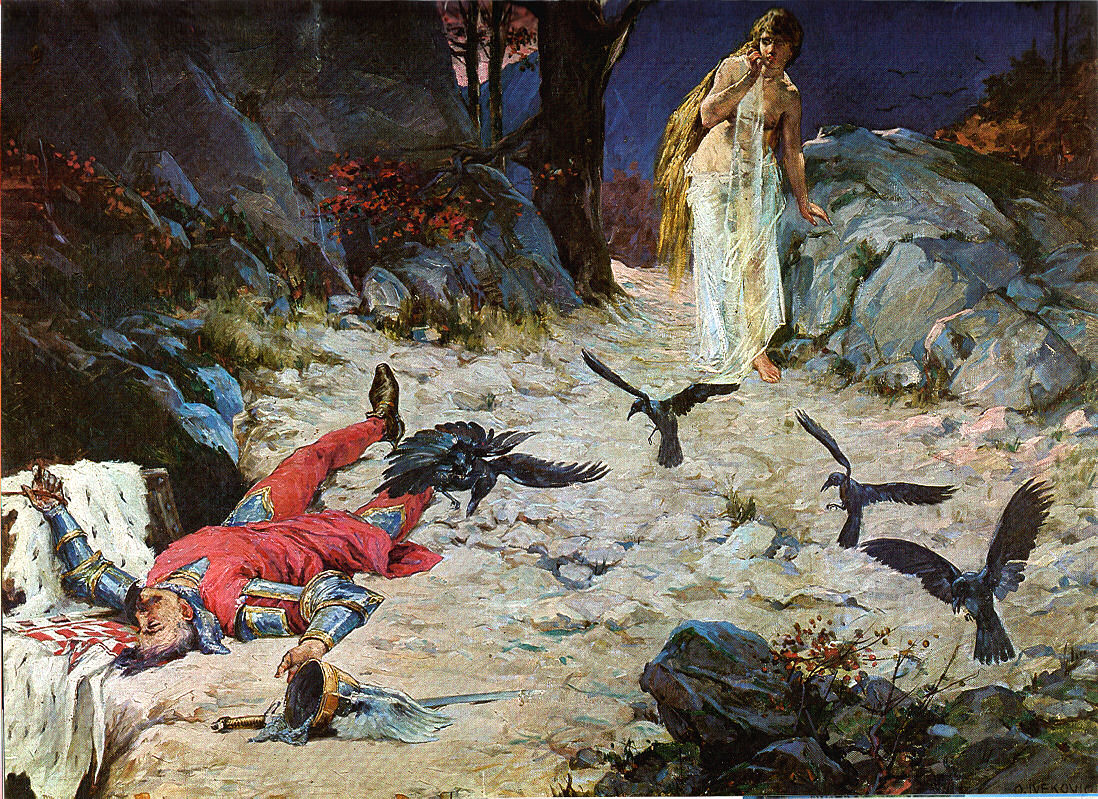
- Death of the Last Croatian King, by Oton Iveković
Date	April/May 1097
Location	Gvozd Mountain, traditionally identified as modern-day Petrova Gora, while more recently identified as modern-day Kapela mountain pass in central Croatia
Result	Hungarian victory

Belligerents
Kingdom of Croatia	Kingdom of Hungary

Commanders and leaders
Petar Snačić †	Coloman of Hungary (not present); Mercurius

Strength
Unknown	Unknown

Casualties and losses
Heavy	Unknown

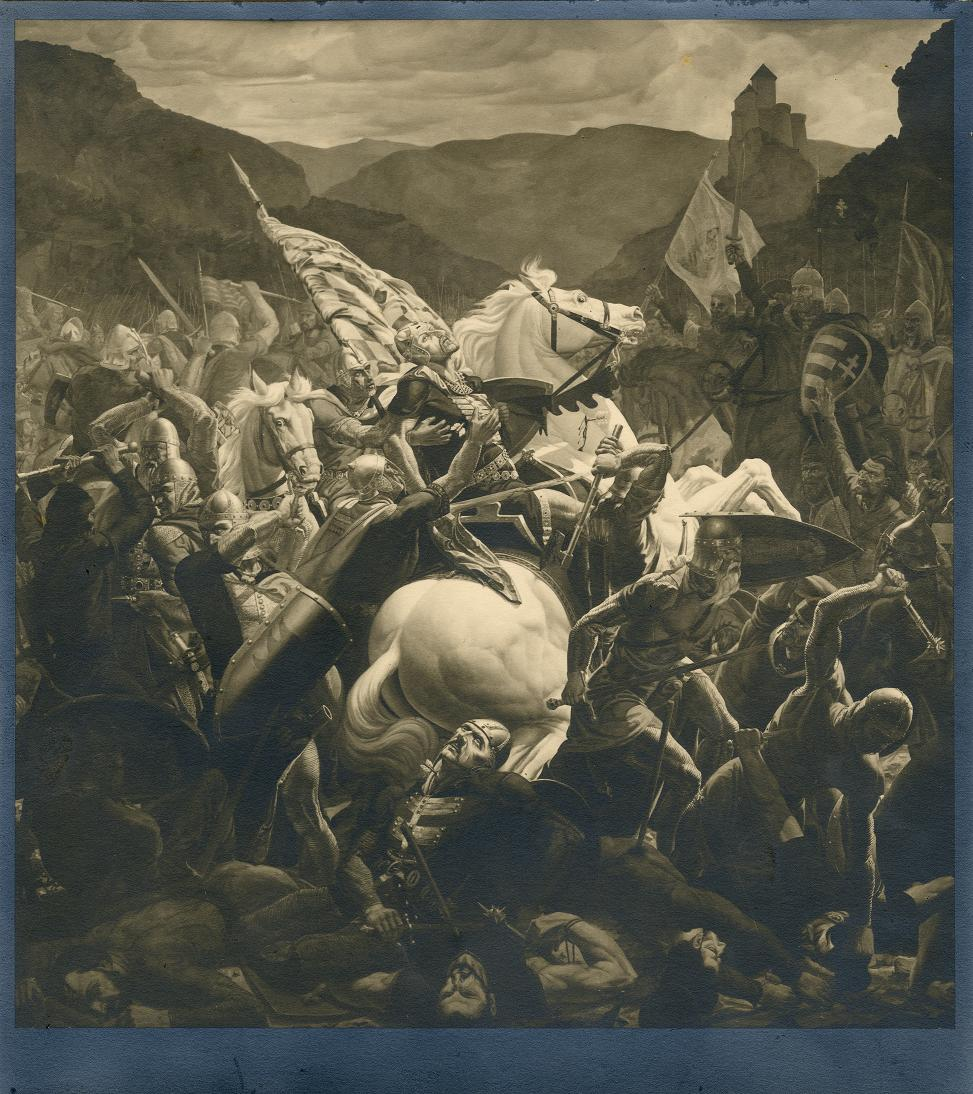
Death of Petar Snačić in the Battle of Gvozd Mountain, by Josip Horvat Međimurec

The Battle of Gvozd Mountain took place in 1097 and was fought between the army of Petar Snačić and King Coloman I of Hungary. It was a decisive Hungarian victory, which ended the War of the Croatian Succession and served as a turning point in Croatian history.

== Location ==
The traditional Croatian historiography identified Gvozd Mountain, the location of the battle according to Gesta Hungarorum, as today's Petrova Gora. In the second half of the 20th century, an alternative interpretation emerged, by which the battle took place in the Kapela mountain pass of central Croatia. The changes in name of these two locations created confusion; the first was known as Slatska Gora until 1445, and only from 1536 as Petrova Gora, while the second until 1522 was known as Iron Mountain (Alpes ferreae), Gvozd (Gozdia) and Petrov Gvozd (Peturgoz) when due to the chapel of St. Nikola (previously St. Mikula), the population started to call it as Kapela.

== Battle ==
In an attempt to win the crown of the Kingdom of Croatia, the Hungarian army crossed the River Drava and invaded Croatian territory, trying to reach the Adriatic coast. A local lord, Petar Snačić, then moved from his residency at Knin castle in an attempt to defend the kingdom from the Hungarians. Petar and his army moved north to meet the advancing Hungarians.

== Aftermath ==
The outcome of the battle was disastrous for Petar's army and country because it marked the official end of a native dynasty ruling in Croatia. Coloman created a personal union between the kingdoms of Hungary and Croatia (allegedly signing the Pacta conventa). He was then crowned as king of Croatia in the Croatian capital Biograd on the Adriatic coast in 1102. Until the end of the World War I in 1918, the two crowns were united in personal union.
