= Hollow Church =

Hollow Church Šuplja crkva
- Basilica of Saint Peter and Moses; Krunidbena crkva sv. Petra i Mojsija
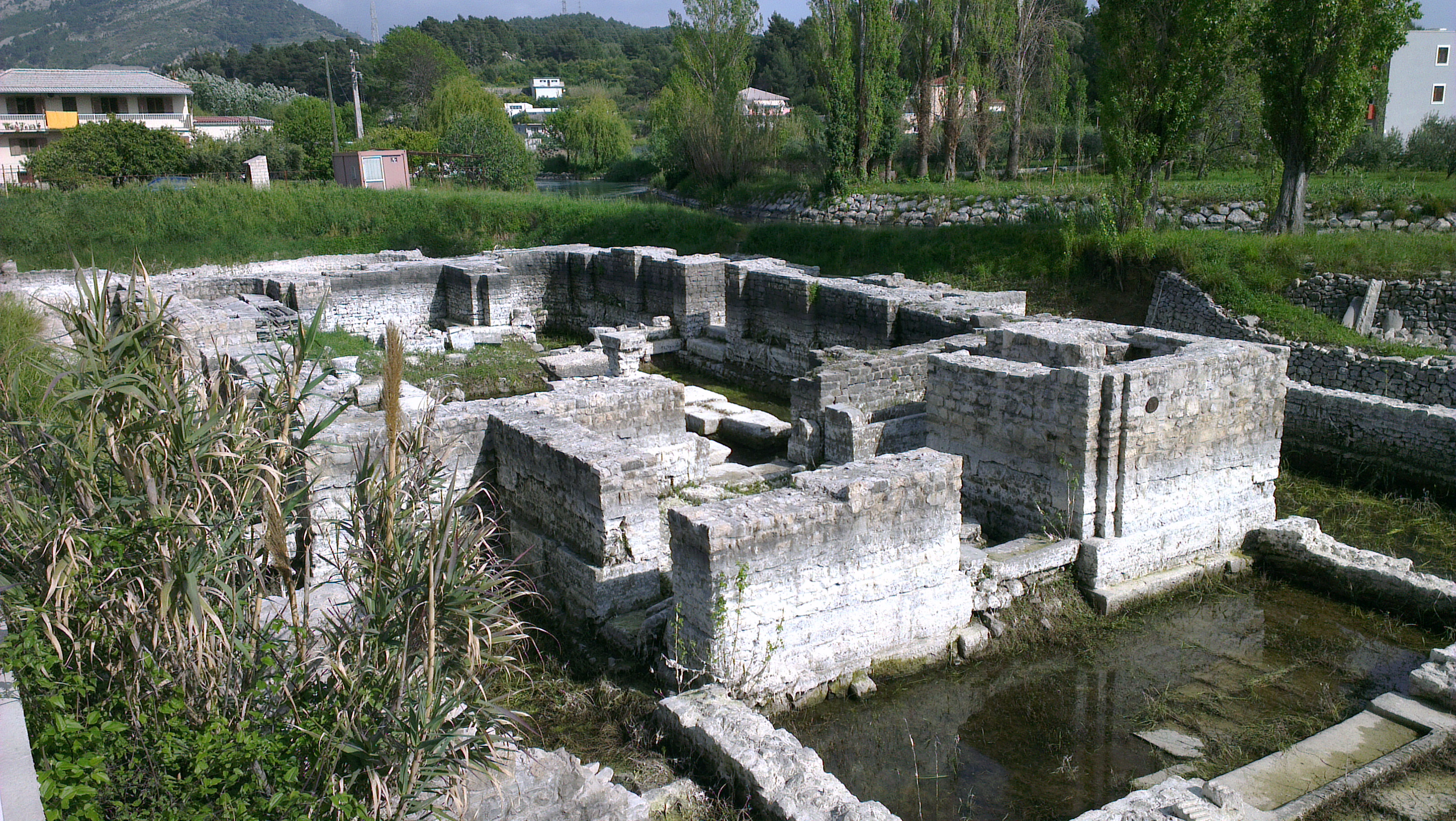
- Church remains in Solin, Croatia

- Hollow Church; Šuplja crkva
- 43.5403°N 16.497°E
- Location: Solin
- Country: Croatia
- Denomination: Catholic
- Website: none

Architecture
- Years built: 11th century

Cultural Good of Croatia
- Type: Protected cultural good
- Reference no.: Z-6095

Hollow Church (Croatian: Šuplja crkva) is the archaeological excavation of what used to be a Romanesque Roman Catholic church in the 11th-century Salona, Croatia.

== History ==
Originally named Basilica of Saint Peter and Moses, the building was built on the foundations of an older Christian church next to a 6th-century Byzantine chapel in the vicinity of the ancient ruins of Salona.

The church is notable for being the crowning place of King Zvonimir, and along the lines of buildings like Saint Stephen and Saint Mary in Solin, is one of the remains of churches built by the Croats in the 11th century. It had three apses, 26 meters long and 13 meters in width, each separated by a column. The narthex was positioned on the western entrance, while the southern side obtained a steeple, from which only few steps still remain. The narthex allegedly contained a sarcophagus, quite possibly of a Croatian king.

The location was first excavated in modern times in the 1920s. In 1931, the excavation work was done by Ejnar Dyggve, whose work there ended after the death of Frane Bulić in 1934. In 1935, Ljubo Karaman restarted works for a period of time. Some restoration work was undertaken in the 1950s, but the most serious archaeological investigation was done in 1990–1993. The site was secured and mostly excavated, but is still threatened by the waters of Jadro and a nearby road.

== See also ==
- Church of Holy Cross, Nin
- Church of Holy Salvation, Cetina

== Gallery ==
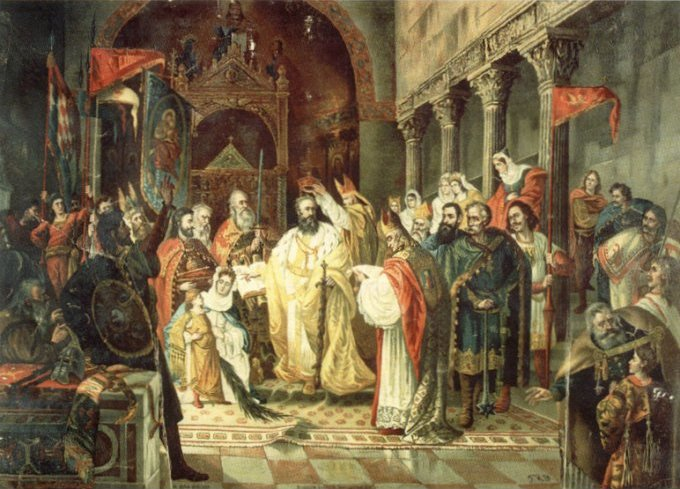
Romanticised portrayal of King Zvonimir's coronation by Ferdinand Quiquerez

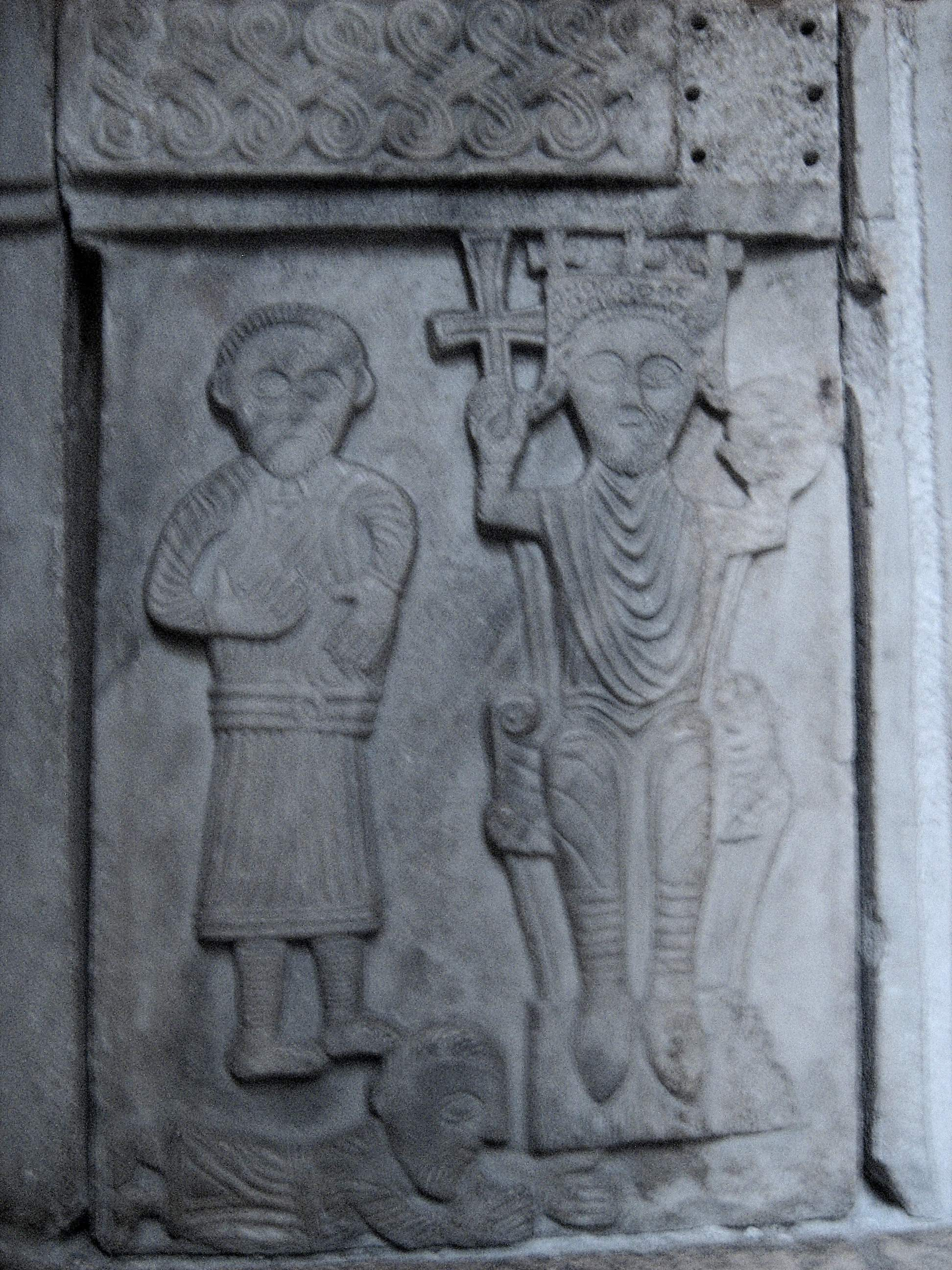
Pluteus dating from 11th century, showing a Croatian king. Some speculate that the pluteus could be actually showing the actual coronation of Petar Krešimir IV or Demetrius Zvonimir.
