= Helena of Hungary, Queen of Croatia =

Queen consort of Croatia from 1075 to c.1089

Helen of Hungary
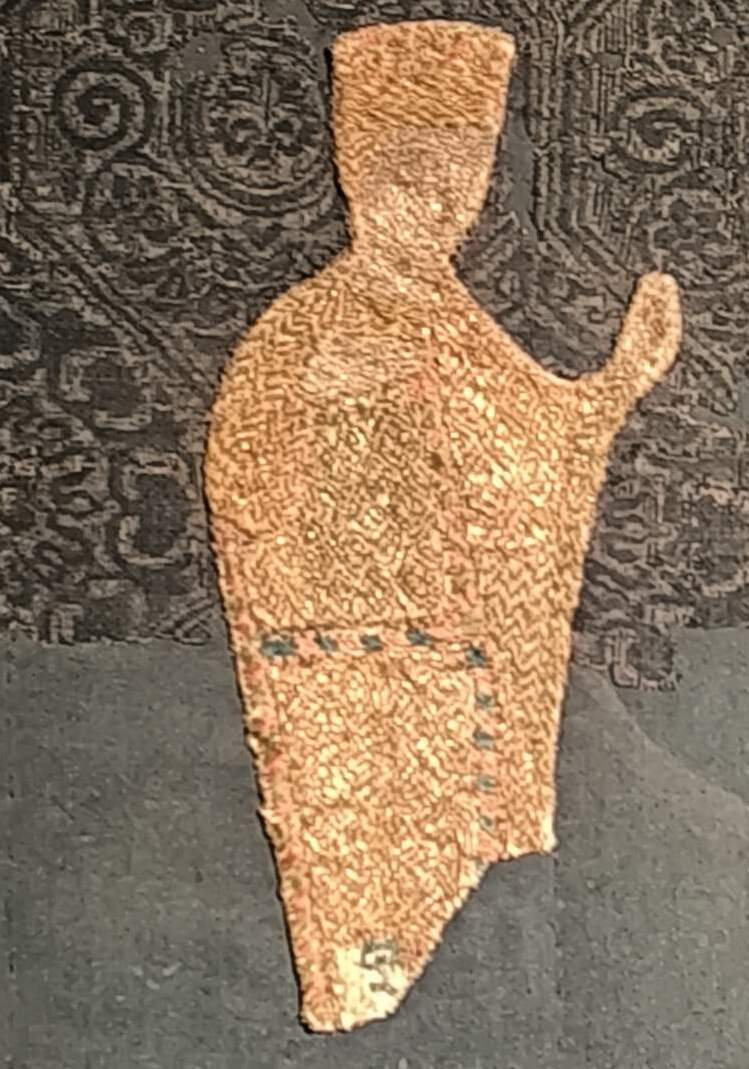
- Depiction of queen Helen on Mantle of king Ladislaus I. from late 11th century.

Regent of Croatia
- Tenure: 1089–1090

Queen consort of Croatia
- Tenure: 1075–c. 1089
- Died: c. 1091
- Spouse: Demetrius Zvonimir
- Issue: Radovan; Klaudija; Vinica
- Dynasty: Árpád
- Father: Béla I of Hungary
- Mother: Richeza of Poland

Helen of Hungary, also known as Helen the Fair (Croatian: Jelena Lijepa; Hungarian: Ilona) (d. 1091), was a queen consort of Croatia.

== Family ==
Helen was born as a Hungarian princess and was the daughter of Árpád dynasty's king Bela I, sister to Ladislaus I of Hungary, granddaughter of Polish king Mieszko II Lambert.

== Marriage ==
Helen became the queen of Croatia during her marriage with Croatian king Demetrius Zvonimir, a distant relative whom she married in 1063. They had a son named Radovan, who died in his late teens or early twenties, and daughters named Claudia and Vinica.

Helen had excellent family connections, being an aunt to Irene, the mother of the Byzantine Emperor Manuel I Komnenos.

Helen was very popular with the Croats, and they often called her Jelena Lijepa ("Helen the Beautiful"). She is thought to have been an influential consort.

Upon the death of Zvonimir, Helen was said to have been quietly plotting the inheritance of the Croatian Crown for her brother, the King of Hungary. This situation caused a decade of war and instability in the kingdom, resulting in the personal union of Croatia and Hungary that lasted until 1918. Helen died around 1091.

Royal titles
Vacant Title last held by Hicela Orseolo as last known queen	Queen consort of Croatia; 1075–1091	Vacant Title next held by Felicia of Sicily as next known queen
