= History of Dalmatia =

The History of Dalmatia concerns the history of the area that covers eastern coast of the Adriatic Sea and its inland regions, from the 2nd century BC up to the present day. The region was populated by Illyrian tribes around 1,000 B.C, including the Delmatae, who formed a kingdom and for whom the province is named. Later it was conquered by Rome, thus becoming the province of Dalmatia, part of the Roman Empire.

Dalmatia was conquered by the Ostrogoths in the 5th century. Slavs started settling in the area in the 6th and 7th century, including Croats and Serbs. These Slavic arrivals created the Duchy and Kingdom of Croatia, Principality of Serbia, and Pagania, Zachlumia, Travunia, Kanalites and Duklja principalities. Since then, the province's territory was vastly reduced to only a coastal part, known as the Byzantine theme of Dalmatia (with its own Dalmatian city-states), and closely associated with the Kingdom of Croatia. Since the 12th century, both Byzantium, Hungary, Venice, and the Ottoman Empire have all fought for control of Dalmatia. In the south, the Republic of Ragusa (1358–1808) emerged. The Republic of Venice held territorries in Dalmatia from 1420 to 1797, during which time the area considered Dalmatia became confined to the Venetian-ruled teritorries. In 1527, the Kingdom of Croatia and Dalmatia became a Habsburg crown land, and in 1812 the Kingdom of Dalmatia was formed. In 1918, Dalmatia was a part of the State of Slovenes, Croats and Serbs, then the Kingdom of Yugoslavia. After World War II, Dalmatia became part of Socialist Federal Republic of Yugoslavia in SR Croatia.

== Illyria and the Delmatae ==
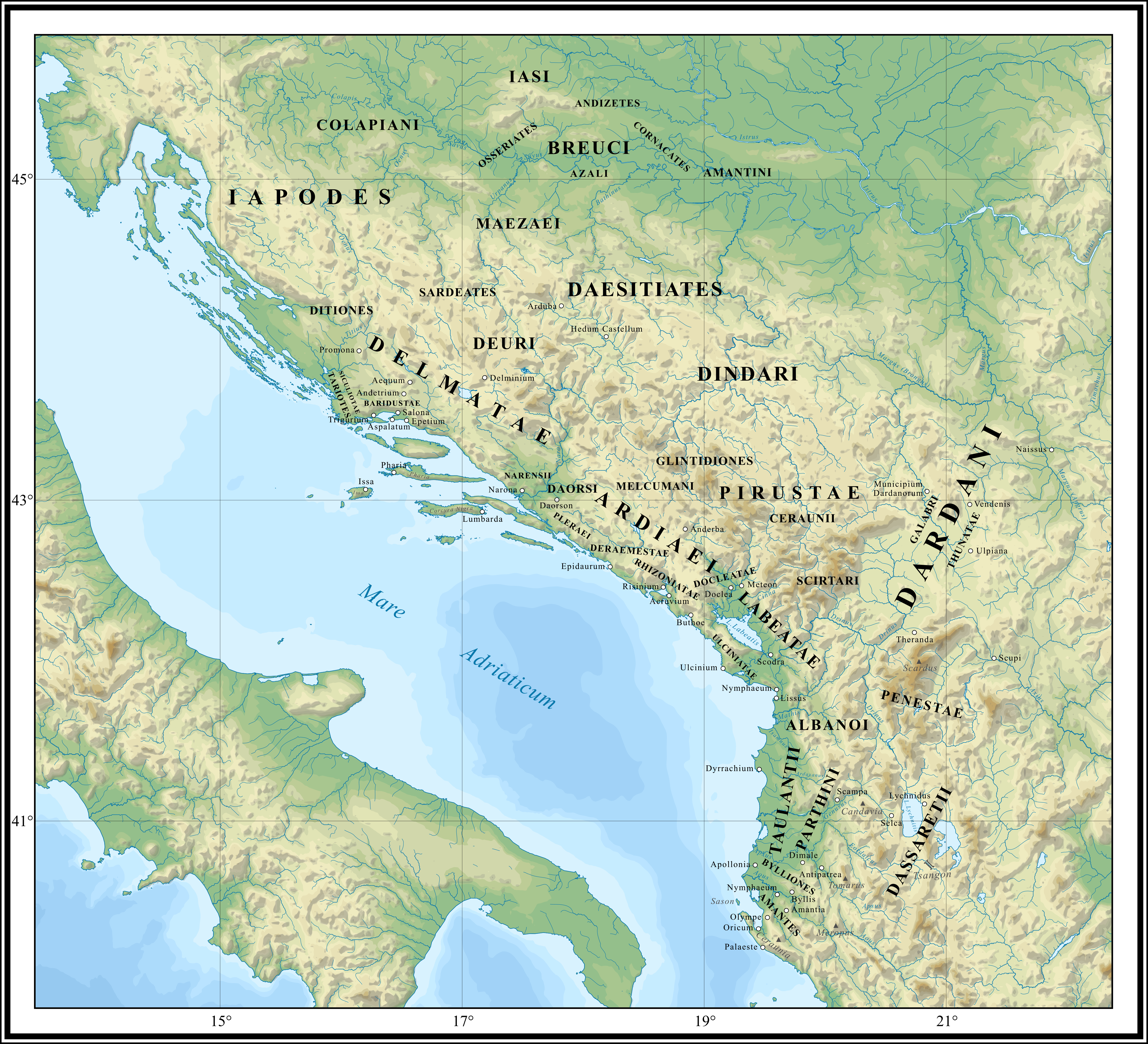
The west Balkan region, showing the location of the Delmatae and other Illyrian tribes

Main articles: Illyria, Ilyrians, Delmatae, Illyro-Roman Wars, Roman-Dalmatian Wars

From around the 10th century B.C., the eastern shore of the Adriatic was inhabited by the Illyrians, a West Balkan Indo-European people. Starting in the 8th century B.C. a number of Illyrian kingdoms were established in the region. These kingdoms traded with and were influenced by neighboring Greek kingdoms. The Greek historian, Polybius, gives as an image of society within an Illyrian kingdom as peasant infantry fought under aristocrats which he calls in Greek Polydynastae (Greek: Πολυδυνάστες) where each one controlled a town within the kingdom. The monarchy was established on hereditary lines and Illyrian rulers used marriages as a means of alliance with other powers.

Three Greek colonies were established on Dalmatian islands, at Pharos (Hvar), Issa (Vis) and Black Korkyra (Korčula), In 229 B.C, Rome started a series of wars, known as the Illyro-Roman Wars, to conquer Illyria, which continued for over 200 years, until 9 A.D..A key role in the Second Roman-Illyro War was played by Demetrius of Pharos (Hvar), who is described as either Greek, half-Greek, or Illyrian In 222 B.C. he became regent of the Illyrian Ardiaean Kingdom. He detached Illyria from its alliance with Rome and re-established its traditional ties with Macedonia, then led a fleet of 90 ships all the way to the Cyclades in Greece.

In 180 BC the Illyrian tribe, the Delmatae, from which Dalmatia derives its name declared itself independent of Gentius, the Illyrian king, and established a republic. Its capital was Delminium (current name Tomislavgrad); its territory stretched northwards from the river Neretva to the river Cetina, and later to the Krka, where it met the confines of Liburnia. After the fall of the Illyrian Ardiaei Kingdom in southern, the Dalmatae posed the greatest force against the Romans in their conquest of Illyria. A series of Roman-Dalmatian Wars were fought for control of Dalmatia, The first war in 156 BC – 155 BC finished with the destruction of the Dalmatian capital Delminium by the Roman army. Additional wars were fought 118-117 BC and 78 BC-76 BC, the latter finishing with Rome's capture of the Dalmatian stronghold of Salona (near modern Split, Croatia). Further uprisings against Rome occurred in 34. B.C., ending with Rome's capturer of the Dalmatian capital of Klis, and during the Great Illyrian Revolt against Rome in 6 - 9 A.D, which involved half a million combatants, auxiliaries and civilians.

== Roman era ==
The province of Dalmatia (colored) c. 125 AD

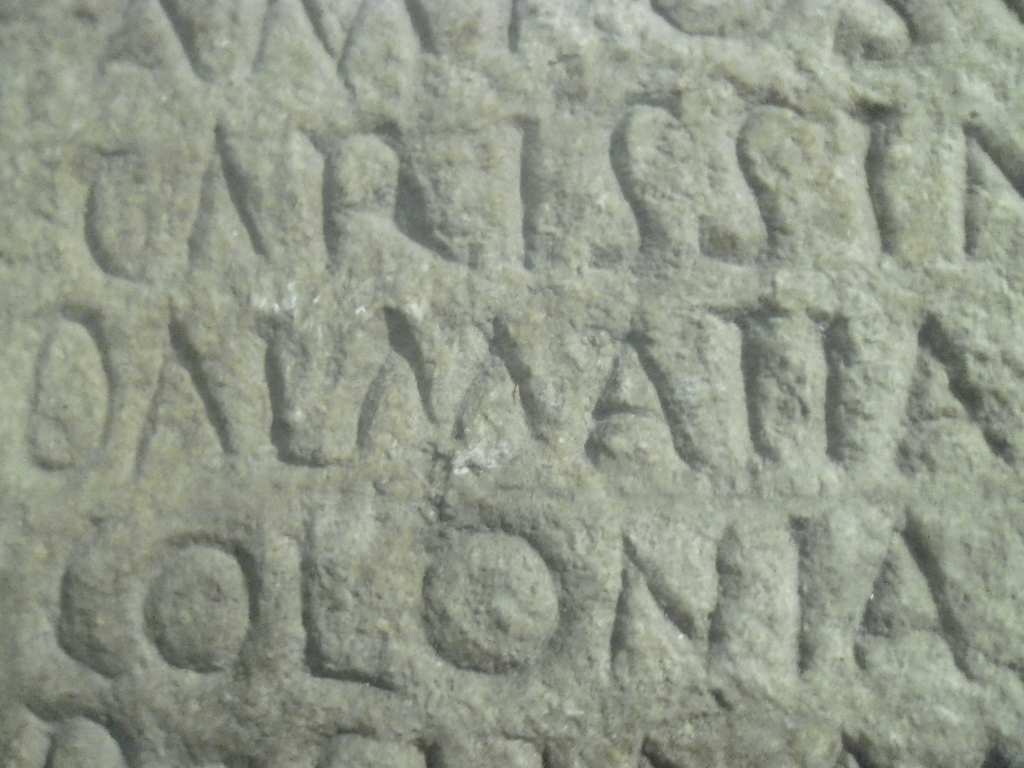
Name Dalmatia on ancient panel

Following the end of the Illyrian wars the Romanization of Dalmatia began, similar as in conquered Gaul and Hispania. The Roman province of Dalmatia spread inland to cover all of the Dinaric Alps and most of the eastern Adriatic coast. Its capital was the city of Salona (Solin). Emperor Diocletian made Dalmatia famous by building a palace for himself a few kilometers south of Salona, in Aspalathos/Spalatum. Other Dalmatian cities at the time were: Tarsatica, Senia, Vegium, Aenona, Iader, Scardona, Tragurium, Aequum, Oneum, Issa, Pharus, Bona, Corcyra Nigra, Narona, Epidaurus, Rhizinium, Acruvium, Olcinium, Scodra, Epidamnus/Dyrrachium.

The Roman Emperor Diocletian (ruled AD 284 to 305) reformed the government in the late Roman Empire and established the Tetrarchy. This new system for the first time divided rule of the empire into the Western and Eastern courts, each headed by a person with the title of Augustus. Each of the two Augusti also had an appointed successor, a Caesar, who administered about half the district belonging to his own Augustus (and was subordinate to him). In Diocletian's division, Dalmatia fell under the rule of the Eastern Court, headed by Diocletian, but was administered by his Caesar and appointed successor Galerius, who had his seat in the city of Sirmium. In AD 395, the Emperor Theodosius I permanently divided Imperial rule by granting his two sons the position of Augusti separately in the West and the East. This time, however, Spalatum and Dalmatia fell under the Western Court of Honorius, not the Eastern Court.

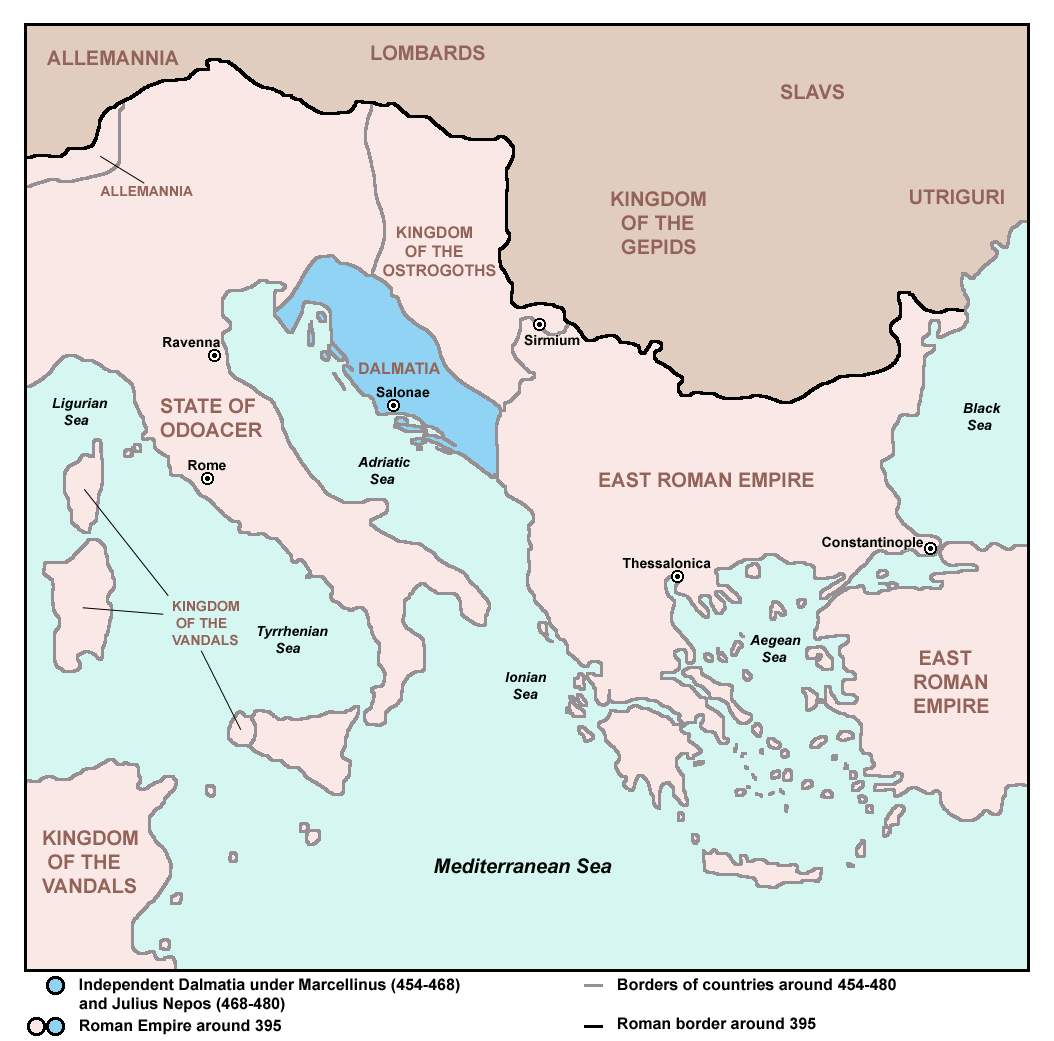
Independent Dalmatia - Extent of Marcellinus' Control (454–468) and Julius Nepos' Control (468–480).

In 468 Flavius Julius Nepos became the ruler of the province of Dalmatia. Four years later, in the spring of 472, the Western Emperor Anthemius was murdered by his Germanic general Ricimer; the appointment of his successor legally fell to Emperor Leo I the Thracian of the Eastern Court. Leo however tarried in his appointment. Ricimer, along with his nephew Gundobad, appointed Olybrius and then Glycerius as their puppet emperors in the West. This was not recognized by Leo I and the Eastern Court, who considered them usurpers. In 473 Leo appointed Flavius Julius Nepos, the ruler of Dalmatia, as the legal Western Emperor. In June 474, Nepos sailed across the Adriatic, entered Ravenna (the seat of the Western court), forced Glycerius to abdicate, and secured the throne. However, next year his Magister militum Orestes forced Nepos to flee back to Salona (on 28 August 475). Romulus Augustulus, the son of Orestes, was proclaimed Emperor within a few months, but was deposed the following year after the execution of his father. Odoacer, the general who deposed Romulus Augustulus, did not appoint a puppet emperor, but instead, for his part, abolished the Western court altogether. Julius Nepos, however, continued to rule in Dalmatia until 480 as the sole legal Emperor of the West (Dalmatia still being de jure a part of the Western court's administration).

== Byzantine period ==
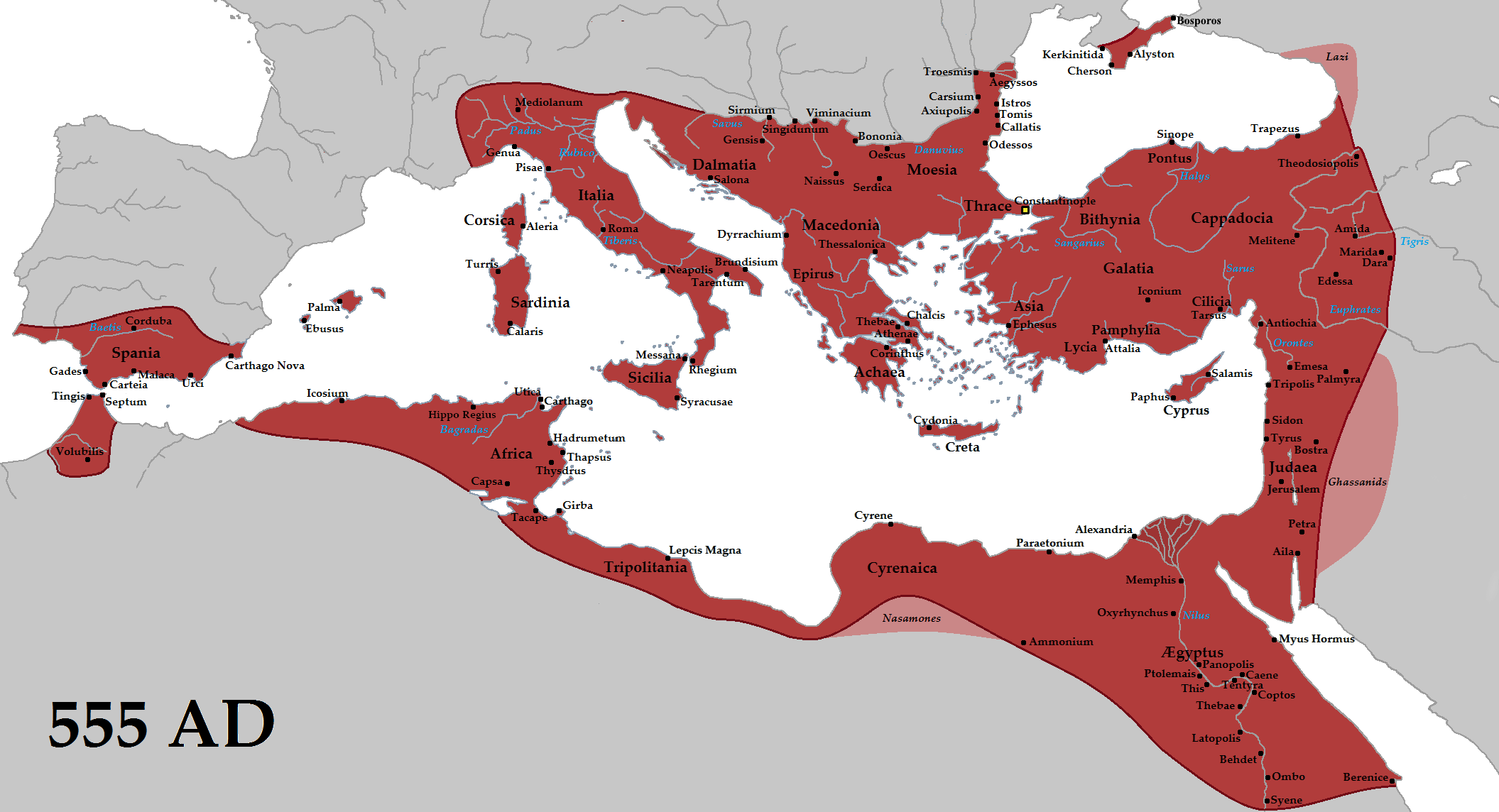
The Byzantine Empire in 555 under Justinian I, its greatest extent since the fall of the Western Roman Empire, with vassals in pink

Following the collapse of the Western Roman Empire in 481 A.D. Dalmatia briefly fell under Gothic rulers who had also conquered Italy - Odoacer and Theodoric the Great. During the rule of the Ostrogoths, Dalmatia was united with the Pannonian area south of the Drava river into a single military-administrative unit, which was governed from Salona.

In 545, during Justinian I's war against the Ostrogoths, Dalmatia became part of the Greek-dominated Byzantine Empire. Ruled from Constantinople, it became a Byzantine province, still associated with Pannonia. The 6th and 7th century saw the gradual arrival of the Slavs and Avars into the territory of Dalmatia, conquering a number of Dalmatian cities (Salona, Epidaurum, Delminium, etc.).The traditional borders between the provinces disappeared, and the direct Byzantine possessions were reduced to a narrow coastal strip of towns and islands, with the hinterland becoming Slavic.

In 751 what remained of Byzantine Dalmatia (the coastal cities of Zadar, Trogir, Split, Dubrovnik and Kotor and the islands of Krk, Lošinj, Cres and Rab) was organized into a separate Dalmatian theme, which was managed by a Byzantine strategist in Zadar. Throughout the following centuries, effectively until the early 13th century and the Fourth Crusade, the city of Split remained a possession of the Byzantine emperors, even though its hinterland would seldom be under Byzantine control, and de facto suzerainty over the city would often be exercised by Croatian, Venetian, or Hungarian rulers. Overall, the city enjoyed significant autonomy during this time, due to the periodic weakness and/or preoccupation of the Byzantine Imperial administration.

== Middle Ages ==
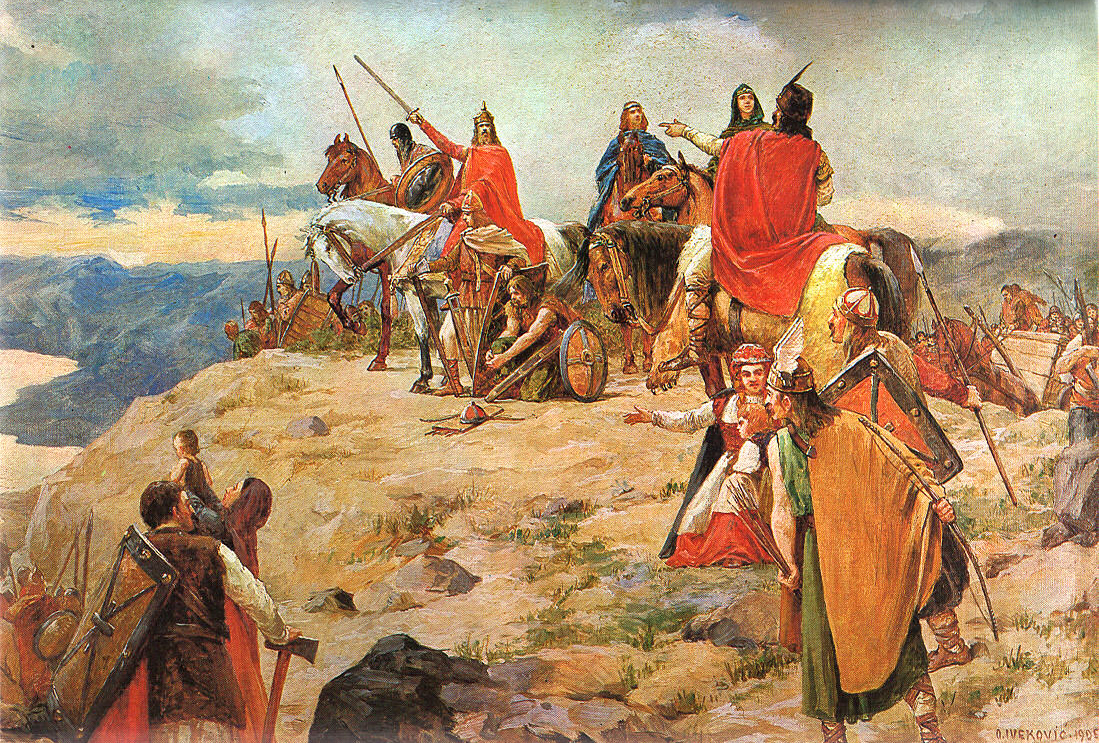
Oton Iveković, The Croats' arrival at the Adriatic Sea

Following the great Slavic migration into Illyria in the first half of the 6th century, Dalmatia became distinctly divided between two different communities:

- The hinterland, semi-depopulated by the Barbarian Invasions, Slavic tribes settled - which were roughly Croats and Serbs. There were also the Romanized Illyrian natives, and Celts in the north.
- The Byzantine enclaves populated by the native Romance-speaking descendants of Romans and Illyrians (speaking Dalmatian), who lived safely in Ragusa, Iadera, Tragurium, Spalatum and some other coastal towns, like Cattaro.

Historical affiliations of Dalmatia
Liburnians and Dalmatae (9th century BC – 59 BC)

Roman Republic (Province) (59 BC – 26 BC)

Roman Empire (Province) (59 BC – 454)

Marcellinus magister militum (454 – 481)

Ostrogothic Kingdom (481 – 535)

Byzantine Empire (535 – 800)

Francia (800 – 812)

Duchy of Croatia (8th century – 925)

Principality of Serbia (780 – 960)

Byzantine Empire (Theme) (812 – 11th century)

Kingdom of Croatia (925 – 1102)

Kingdom of Dioclea (925 – 1102)

Kingdom of Hungary ( Kingdom) (1102 – 1202)

Grand Principality of Serbia (1091–1217)

Republic of Venice (1202 – 1358)

Serbian Kingdom (1217 – 1346)

Serbian Empire (1346–1371)

Bosnian Banate (1325 – 1377)

Bosnian Kingdom (1377 – 1463)

Serbian Despotate (1402–1459)

Duchy of Saint Sava (1448 – 1482)

Kingdom of Hungary ( Kingdom) (1358 – 1409)

Republic of Ragusa (1358 – 1808)

Kingdom of Naples (1403 – 1409)

Republic of Venice ( Regimento) (1409 – 1797)

Austria ( Kingdom) (1797 – 1806)

First French Empire ( Province) (1806 – 1813)

Austria ( Kingdom) (1813 – 1867)

Austria-Hungary( Kingdom) (1867 – 1918)

Kingdom of Italy ( Governorate) (1918 – 1920)

Kingdom of Yugoslavia (1920 – 1941)

Region of Dalmatia (1918 - 1922)

Province of Zara (Zadar) (1920 – 1941)

Banate of Croatia (1939 – 1941)

Kingdom of Italy ( Governorate) (1941 – 1943)

German Occupation (OZAK) (1943 – 1944)

SFR Yugoslavia ( SR Croatia) (1944 – 1991)

ZO Dalmacija (1974 – 1990)

Republic of Croatia (1991 – today)

=== Duchy of Croatia ===
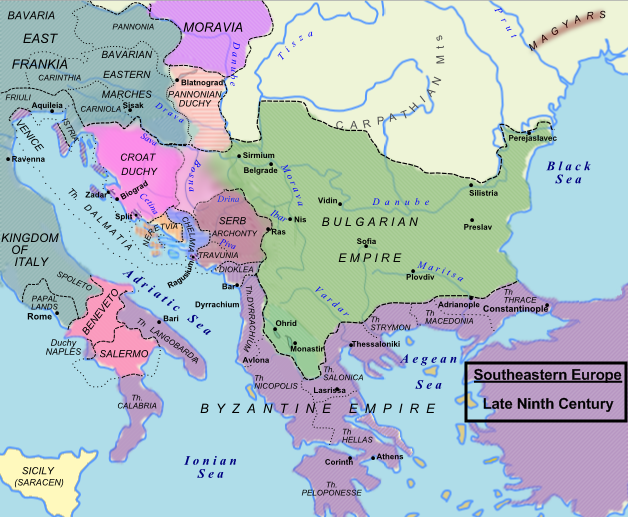
The Duchy of Croatia (in pink) and other Slavic lands of Dalmatia in 850 AD

With the arrival and conquest by the Slavs who started organizing their own principalities, the Roman province of Dalmatia in the sense of a political subject with the name of Dalmatia by the 9th century fell to the narrow coastal-island Theme of Dalmatia (existed between c. 870s-1060s) which was under Byzantine influence and control.

The most significant Slavic principality founded on the former large province of Dalmatia was the Duchy of Croatia and Borna of Croatia (803–821) is one of the earliest recorded rulers in Dalmatia. In 806, Dalmatia was temporarily added to the Frankish Empire, but the cities were restored to Byzantium by the Treaty of Aachen in 812. The treaty had also slightly expanded the Duchy of Dalmatia eastwards.

The establishment of cordial relations between the cities and the Croatian dukedom began with the reign of Duke Mislav (835), who signed an official peace treaty with Pietro, doge of Venice in 840 and who also started giving land donations to the churches from the cities. Dalmatia's Croatian Duke Trpimir (ruled 845–864), founder of the House of Trpimir, greatly expanded the new Duchy to include territories all the way to the river of Drina, thereby covering the entirety of Bosnia in his wars against the Bulgar Khans and their Serbian subjects. The Saracens had raided the southernmost cities in 840 and 842, but this threat was eliminated by a common Frankish-Byzantine campaign of 871.

Since the time of duke Branimir of Croatia, Venetians had to pay taxes to Croatia and to the Narentines for their ships traveling along the eastern Adriatic coast, while the Dalmatian city-states paid 710 ducats of tribute to the Croatian ruler.

Duke Tomislav had created the Kingdom of Croatia in 924 or 925, and was crowned in Tomislavgrad after defending and annexing the Principality of Pannonia. His powerful realm extended influence further southwards to Duklja. Between 986 and 990, king Stephen Držislav was awarded by the Byzantine Emperor Basil II the titles of Patriarch and Eparch, by which gave him formal authority over the Theme of Dalmatia (but some historians believe not over the Dalmatian city-states). According to Thomas the Archdeacon, Stephen Držislav received royal insignia and the titles as an act of recognition from the Byzantine Emperor, becoming reges Dalmatie et Chroatie and his descendants having the same titles.

As the Littoral Croatian Duchy became a Kingdom after 925, its capitals were in Dalmatia: Biaći, Nin, Split, Knin, Solin and elsewhere. Also, the Croatian noble tribes, who had a right to choose Croatian duke (later the king), were from Dalmatia: Karinjani and Lapčani, Polečići, Tugomirići, Kukari, Snačići, Gusići, Šubići (from which later developed very powerful noble family Zrinski), Mogorovići, Lačničići, Jamometići and Kačić. Within the borders of ancient Roman Dalmatia, the Croatian nobles of Krk, or Krčki (from which later developed very powerful noble family Frankopan) were from Dalmatia as well.

Meanwhile, the Croatian kings exacted tribute from the Byzantine cities, Tragurium, Iadera and others, and consolidated their own power in the purely Croatian-settled towns such as Nin, Biograd and Šibenik. The city of Šibenik was founded by Croatian kings. They also ascertained control over the bordering southern duchies. Rulers of the medieval Croatian state who had control over the Dalmatian littoral and the cities were the dukes Trpimir, Domagoj, Branimir, and the kings Tomislav, Trpimir II, Krešimir I, Stjepan Držislav, Petar Krešimir IV and Dmitar Zvonimir.

=== Principality of Serbia ===
In the mid-9th century, the Serbian principality gained prominence along the eastern part of the Adriatic coast. Contemporary sources, notably the Royal Frankish Annals, document that the Serbs controlled a part of Dalmatia, described as "Sorabos, quae natio magnam Dalmatiae partem obtinere dicitur." This early territorial expansion laid the foundation for subsequent political developments in the region. The emergence of organized political entities began with the consolidation of the first Serbian Vlastimirović dynasty from 610 to 960. During this period, two principal Serbian principalities emerged: Duklja (also known as Dioclea) in the southeast and Travunia in the northwest. These principalities were strategically positioned around the Bay of Kotor (Boka Kotorska), facilitating control over important maritime trade routes.

=== Southern Dalmatia ===
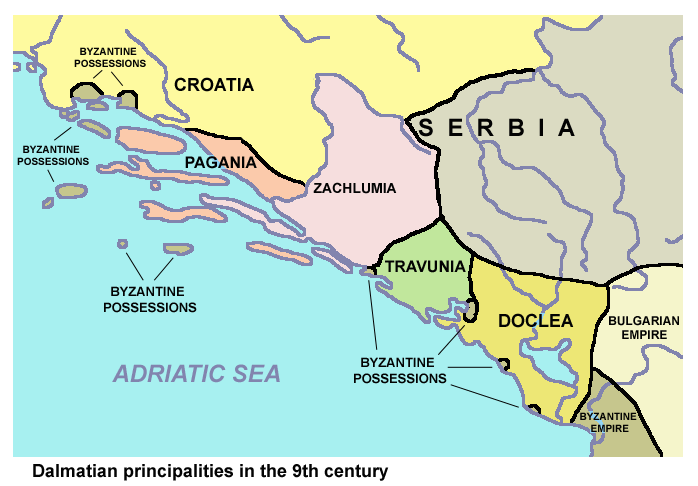
Pagania, Zahumlje, Travunia, and Duklja were located in the southern part of the former Roman province of Dalmatia.

The area of Southern Dalmatia was divided among four small principalities called Pagania, Zahumlje, Travunia and Duklja. Pagania was a minor duchy between Cetina and Neretva. The territories of Zahumlje and Travunia spread much further inland than the current borders of Dalmatia. Duklja (the Roman Doclea) began south of Dubrovnik and spread down to the Skadar Lake.

==== Pagania ====
Pagania was given its name because of the paganism of its inhabitants, when neighbouring tribes were Christian. The pirate-like people of Pagania/Narenta (named after river Narenta) expressed their buccaneering capabilities by pirateering the Venetian-controlled Adriatic between 827 and 828, while the Venetian fleet was further afield, in the Sicilian waters. As soon as the fleet of the Venetian Republic returned, the Neretvians fell back; when the Venetians left, the Neretvians would immediately embark on new raids. In 834 and 835, they caught and killed several Venetian traders returning from Benevent. To punish the Neretvians, the Venetian Doge launched a military expedition against them in 839. The war continued with the inclusion of the Dalmatian Croats, but a truce was quickly signed, although, only with the Dalmatian Croats and some of the Pagan tribes. In 840, the Venetians launched an expedition against the Neretvian Prince Ljudislav, but without success. In 846, a new operation was launched that raided the Slavic land of Pagania, destroying one of her most important cities (Kaorle). This did not end the Neretvian resistance, as they continued to raid and steal from the Venetian occupators.

It was not until 998 that the Venetians gained the upper hand. Doge Peter II Orseolo finally crushed the Neretvians and assumed the title duke of the Dalmatians (Dux Dalmatianorum), though without conflicting Byzantine suzerainty. In 1050, the Neretvians where part of Kingdom of Croatia under King Stjepan I.

==== Zahumlje ====
Zahumlje got its name from the mountain of Hum near Bona, where the river of Buna flowed. It included two old cities: Bona and Hum. Zahumlje included parts of modern-day regions of Herzegovina and southern Dalmatia. Zahumlje's first known ruler was Michael of Zahumlje, he was mentioned together with Tomislav of Croatia in Pope John X's letter of 925. In that same year, he participated in the first church councils in Split. Michael, with grand titles of the Byzantine court as anthypatos and patrician (patrikios), remained ruler of Zahumlje through the 940s, while maintaining good relations with the Pope.

==== Travunia ====
Travunia was initially a town, present-day Trebinje, that was promoted to a fief during the rule of Vlastimir of Serbia, when he married his daughter to nobleman Krajina Belojević. It was ruled by this family until the next century, when Boleslav Petrović, the son of Predimir ruled Serbia. At this time it had the following Župania: Libomir, Vetanica, Rudina, Crusceviza, Vrmo, Rissena, Draceviza, Canali, Gernoviza. It is annexed during the rule of Pavle Branović.

Dragomir Hvalimirović restores the title of Travunia, but is murdered in the 1010s, and the maritime lands are annexed by the Byzantines, and then Serbia. Grdeša, of unknown genealogy, is given the rule of Travunia under Uroš II Prvoslav. It is part of Serbia until 1377, when Bosnian Ban Tvrtko takes the area.

=== Serbian Kingdom of Dioclea ===
In 1002, part of Dalmatia suffered damage under the occupation of the First Bulgarian Empire, and in the following year it was ceded to Jovan Vladimir's Serbian Kingdom of Dioclea. Dioclea gradually became more powerful under the Serbian Vojislavljević dynasty and eventually gained independence from Byzantium in 1042.

In 1043, Serbian prince Stefan Vojislav, "toparch of the Dalmatian kastra of Zeta and Ston," achieved a decisive victory against Byzantine forces in the Battle of Bar, marking Decisive Doclean Serb victory and subsequently establishing Bar as his seat of power and expanding the territorial extent of his domain. John Skylitzes stated: "Stefan Vojislav, archon of Serbs, who not long ago escaped from Constantinople and took the land of the Serbs, banishing Theophilos Erotikos." Vojislav then expanded the area under his rule.

Mihailo I of Duklja, Prince of Triballians and Serbs, established the Archdiocese of Antivari with the title Primas Serviae (Serbiae) and later Primas totius Regni Serbiae. He continued to fight the Byzantines in order to secure the town's independence. This led to a form of state known as the Grand Principality of Serbia. Anna Comnena described the battles of the Serbian ruler Vukan and her father Emperor Alexius, writing: "This Bolkan was ruler of all Dalmatia [i.e. Serbia], a fine orator and a man of action." From 1101 to 1166, the principality was ruled by the Serbian Vukanović dynasty. However, from 1166 to 1183, part of Dalmatia fell under Byzantine rule.

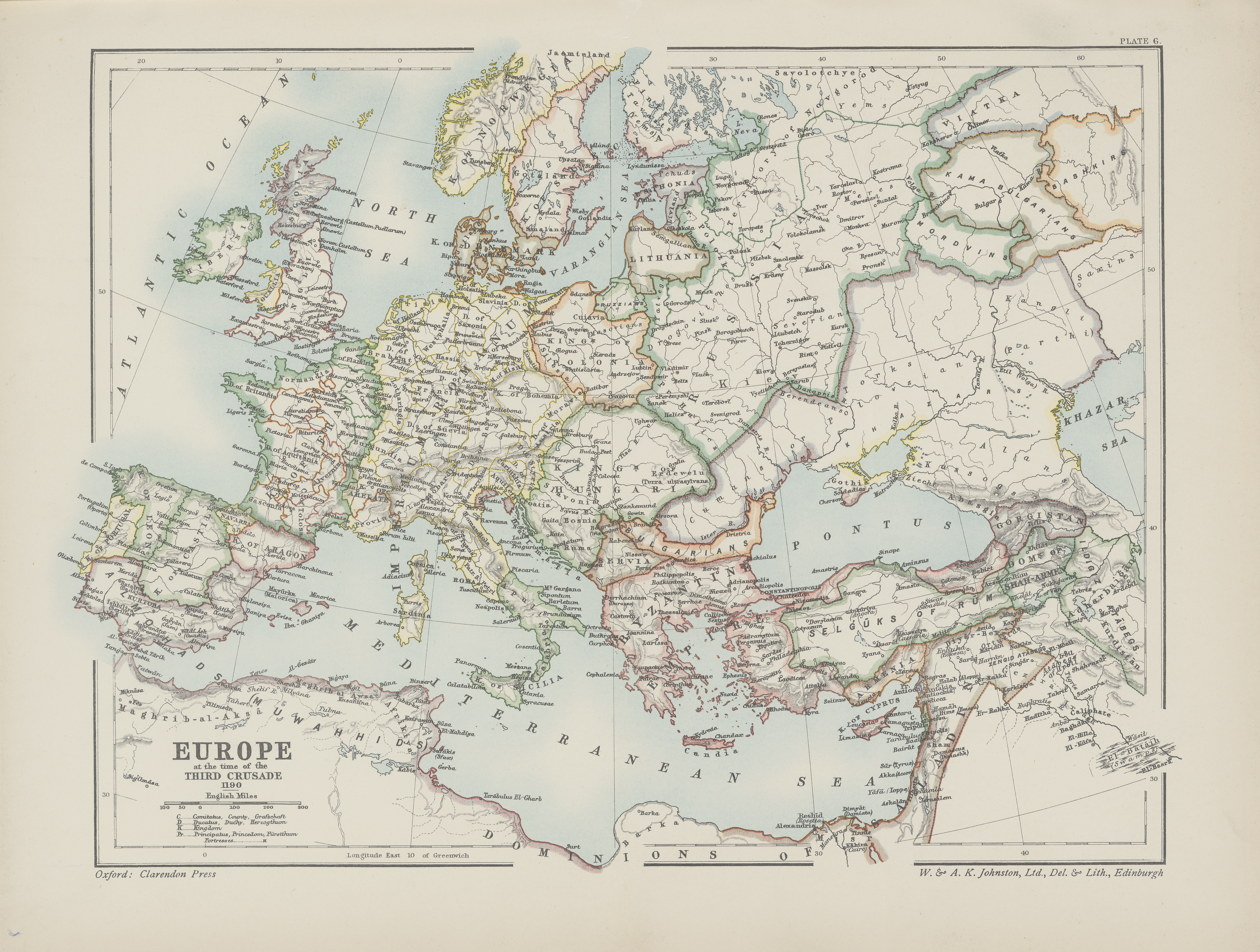
1190 Europe

=== Great Serbian Principality, Kingdom and Empire ===
==== Expansion under Nemanja ====
In 1171, Stefan Nemanja, Grand Prince of Serbia, sided with the Republic of Venice in a dispute with the Byzantine Empire. The Venetians incited the Slavs of the eastern Adriatic littoral to rebel against Byzantine rule and Nemanja joined them, launching an offensive towards Kotor. The Bay was thenceforth under the rule of the Nemanjić dynasty. In 1195, Nemanja and his son Vukan constructed the Church of Saint Luka in Kotor. In 1183, Dalmatian cities like Bay of Kotor, Bar, Budva, Tivat, and Ulcinj were under Serbian rule by the noble Nemanjić dynasty Grand Principality of Serbia. This marked the beginning of nearly two centuries of Nemanjić rule, lasting until 1360, passing to the Serbian Kingdom (1217–1346) and then to the Serbian Empire.

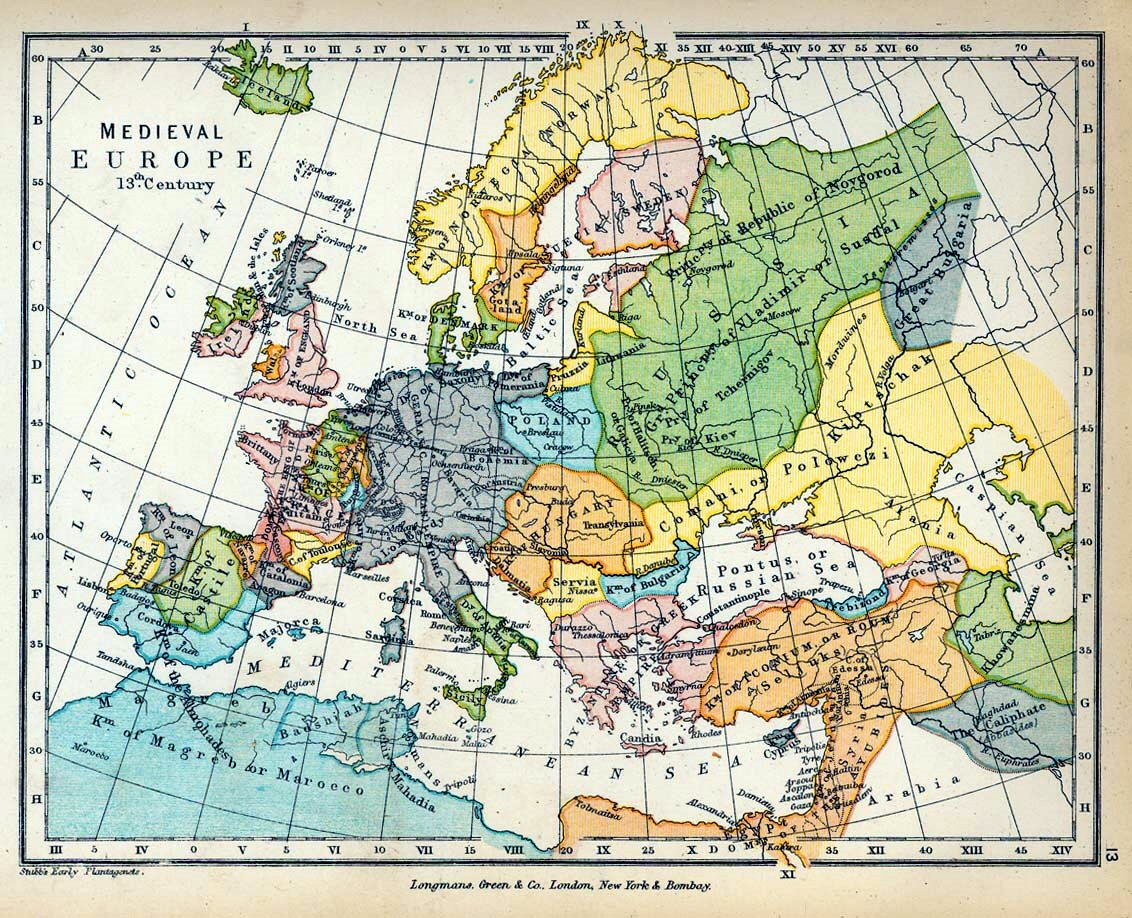
13th century Europe

==== Serbian Kingdom and Church formation ====
In 1217, King of Serbia Stefan Prvovenčani was crowned by Pope Honorius III with the title of "King of Serbia, Dalmatia, and Bosnia;" however, Stefan did not have full control of Dalmatia, only the southern part. In 1219, Saint Sava of Serbia, the first Archbishop of the Serbian Church, who briefly ruled as Prince of Hum, held the title "Archbishop of all Serbian and Maritime Lands." He founded the Monastery of the Holy Mother of God in Dalmatia at Ston, as a seat of the Eparchy of Hum, one of the eparchies of the Serbian Orthodox Church. Following an earthquake in the 1250s, the episcopal seat was transferred to the Church of Peter and Paul on the Lim river. The Serbian king Stefan Vladislav held the title "King of Serbia and Serbia Maritima." During the Mongol invasion of Bulgaria and Serbia, the Serbian cities of Kotor, Drivast and Svač were destroyed.

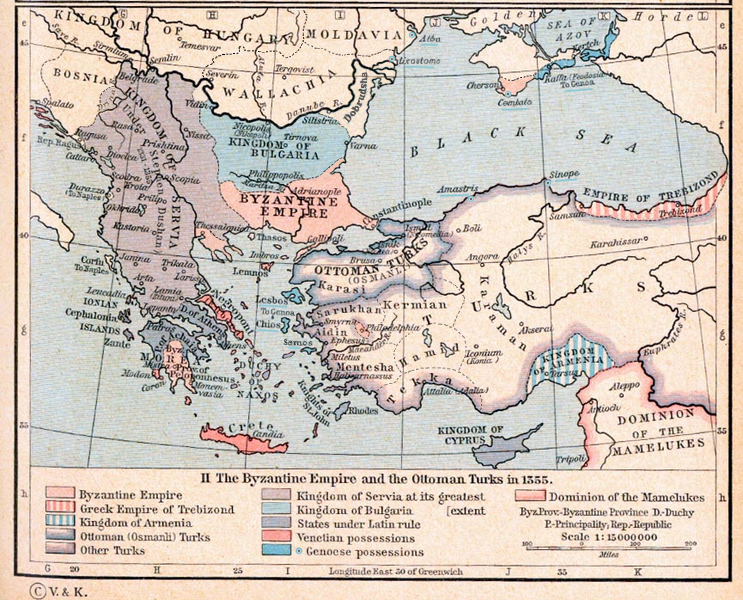
Southern Europe 1355

==== Serbian Empire period ====
In 1292, the Serbian King Dušan donated Ston (Stangrad) with 2,000 duša, which belonged to the Dubrovnik region, to the Serbian monastery of Hilandar. According to Dušan's second charter dated January 22, 1333, in addition to Ston, he gave "Rat" and all the lands from Prevlaka to Dubrovnik to the city of Dubrovnik. This gift was confirmed by charters of the Serbian rulers dated April 10, 1357 and November 4, 1470. Serbian Orthodox priests continued to serve in Ston up to 1333, when the region was ceded by mutual agreement to the Republic of Ragusa by Serbian Emperor Stefan Dušan, under the condition of religious toleration imposed upon the Republic.

In the south, due to its protected location, Kotor became a major city and main port of the Serbian Kingdom and then of the Serbian Empire for the salt trade. The area was prosperous during the 14th century under the rule of Emperor of the Serbs Dušan the Mighty, who encouraged law enforcement, which helped the Bay of Kotor to become a safe place for doing business.

=== Republic of Venice and the Kingdom of Hungary ===
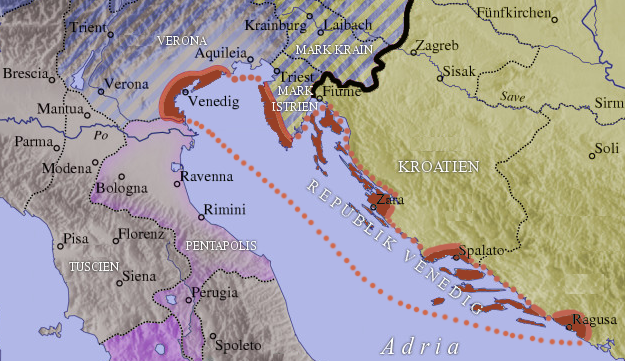
Map of the Venetian Republic, c. 1000. The republic is in dark red, borders in light red.

As the Dalmatian city-states gradually lost all protection by Byzantium, being unable to unite in a defensive league hindered by their internal dissensions, they had to turn to either Venice or Hungary for support. Each of the two political factions had support within the Dalmatian city states, based mostly on economic reasons.

The Venetians, to whom the Dalmatians were already bound by language and culture, could afford to concede liberal terms as its main goal was to prevent the development of any dangerous political or commercial competitor on the eastern Adriatic. The seafaring community in Dalmatia looked to Venice as mistress of the Adriatic. In return for protection, the cities often furnished a contingent to the army or navy of their suzerain, and sometimes paid tribute either in money or in kind. Arbe (Rab), for example, annually paid ten pounds of silk or five pounds of gold to Venice.

Hungary, on the other hand, defeated the last Croat king in 1097 and laid claim on all lands of the Croatian noblemen since the treaty 1102. King Coloman proceeded to conquer Dalmatia in 1102–1105. The farmers and the merchants who traded in the interior favoured Hungary as their most powerful neighbour on land that affirmed their municipal privileges. Subject to the royal assent they might elect their own chief magistrate, bishop and judges. Their Roman law remained valid. They were even permitted to conclude separate alliances. No alien, not even a Hungarian, could reside in a city where he was unwelcome; and the man who disliked Hungarian dominion could emigrate with all his household and property. In lieu of tribute, the revenue from customs was in some cases shared equally by the king, chief magistrate, bishop and municipality.

These rights and the analogous privileges granted by Venice were, however, too frequently infringed. Hungarian garrisons were being quartered on unwilling towns, while Venice interfered with trade, the appointment of bishops, or the tenure of communal domains. Consequently, the Dalmatians remained loyal only while it suited their interests, and insurrections frequently occurred. Even in Zara four outbreaks are recorded between 1180 and 1345, although Zadar was treated with special consideration by its Venetian masters, who regarded its possession as essential to their maritime ascendancy. The doubtful allegiance of the Dalmatians tended to protract the struggle between Venice and Hungary, which was further complicated by internal discord due largely to the spread of the Bogomil heresy, and by many outside influences.

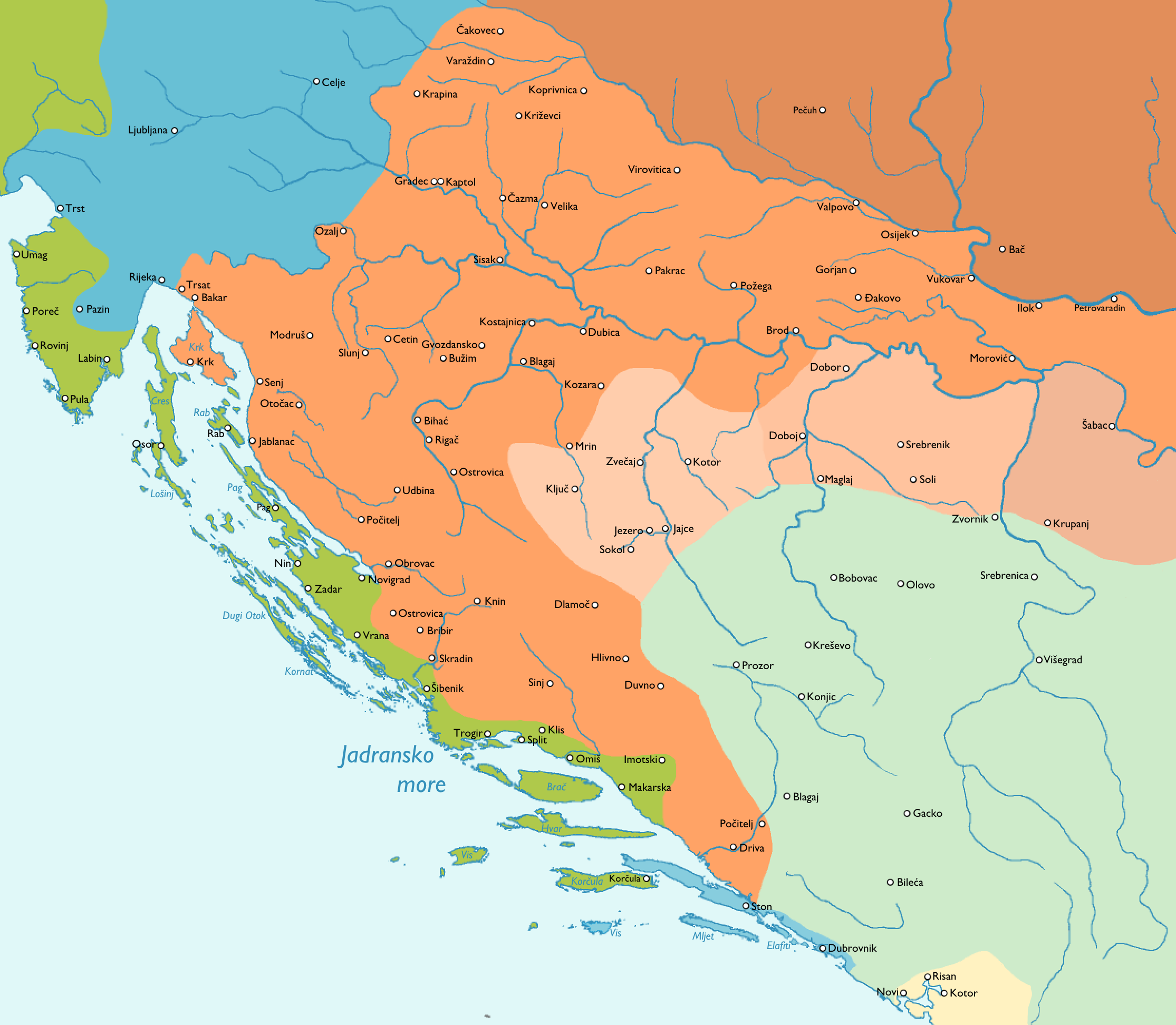
Dalmatia divided between Venetian Republic and Croatian Kingdom in personal union with Hungary in 1469.

In 1202 the crusaders had an agreement with Venice for transport to the Holy Land, and as payment Venice set the condition that the crusaders help them capture Zadar (or Zara), Despite Pope Innocent III forbidding such an attack on a Christian city, the Venetians and the crusaders attacked and sacked the city, forcing its inhabitants to flee, for which the Pope excommunicated the Venetians and crusaders. After wintering in Zadar, the Fourth Crusade continued its campaign, which led to the siege of Constantinople. In 1204 the same army conquered Byzantium and finally eliminated the Eastern Empire from the list of contenders on Dalmatian territory. The early 13th century was marked by a decline in external hostilities. The Dalmatian cities started accepting foreign sovereignty (mainly of the Republic of Venice) but eventually they reverted to their previous desire for independence. The Mongol invasion severely impaired Hungary, so much that in 1241, the king Béla IV had to take refuge in Dalmatia (in the Klis fortress). The Mongols attacked the Dalmatian cities for the next few years but eventually withdrew.

The Croats were no longer regarded by the city folk as a hostile people, in fact the power of certain Croatian magnates, notably the counts Šubić of Bribir, was from time to time supreme in the northern districts (in the period between 1295 and 1328). In 1344, the citizens of Zadar again rebelled against Venetian rule. The Venetians put down the rebellion with 20,000 - to 30,000 troops and their navy during the 1345-1346 Siege of Zadar. In 1346, Dalmatia was struck by the Black Death. The economic situation was also poor, and the cities became more and more dependent on Venice.

=== Banate and Kingdom of Bosnia ===
==== Expansion under Stephen II ====
Stephen II was the Bosnian Ban from 1314, but in reality from 1322 to 1353 together with his brother, Vladislav Kotromanić in 1326–1353. By 1326 Ban Stephen II attacked Serbia in a military alliance with the Republic of Ragusa and conquered Zahumlje (what will later become Hum), gaining more of Adriatic Sea coast, from mouth of the Neretva to Konavle, with areas significant Orthodox population under the Serbian Orthodox Church and mixed Orthodox and Catholic population in coastal areas and around Ston. He also expanded into Završje, including the fields of Glamoč, Duvno and Livno. Immediately after the death of Serbian King Stefan Uroš II Milutin in 1321, he had no problem in acquiring his lands of Usora and Soli, which he fully incorporated in 1324.

When an all-out war broke out between the armies of Prince Ivan Nelipić and Juraj II Šubić in the Summer of 1324, Ban Stephen II contributed considerable support to the Šubićs, without involving his forces into clashes. Prince Nelipac massacred Šubić's party near Knin, and immediately pushed the fight against Ban Stephen II, and managed to capture city of Visuća, but Stephen's shrewd politics and willingness to bestow his nobility with privileges had paid off, as Vuk of Vukoslavić family had helped him to retake the city. Although Stephen's military ambitions were only relatively successful, he continued to wage war against the enemies of the Šubić, the Nelipićs. His target was the city of Trogir which was one of the major supporters of Nelipić's campaigning. Stephen adopted a harsh tactic. His forces raided Caravans from Trogir, which eventually forced its denizens to humbly sign a peace and addressed him as the high and mighty lord Stephen free ruler and master of Bosnia, Usora and Soli and many other places and Prince of the Hum.

Throughout his reign in the fourteenth century, Stephen ruled the lands from Sava to the Adriatic and from Cetina to Drina. He doubled the size of his state and achieved full independence from surrounding countries.

In 1346 Zadar finally returned to Venice, and the Hungarian King, seeing that he had lost the war, made peace in 1348. Ban of Croatia Mladen II Šubić was greatly opposed to Stephen II's policy, accusing him of treason and the relations between the two Bans worsened ever afterwards. By 1342 the Franciscan Vicariat of Bosnia was established. During the reign of Stjepan II Kotromanić all three churches (Bosnian Church, Orthodox, Catholic) were active in Bosnian Banate.

Territorial development of medieval Bosnian state

==== Expansion under Tvrtko I ====
Stephen Tvrtko, the founder of the Bosnian kingdom, was able in 1389 to annex the Adriatic littoral between Kotor (Cattaro) and Šibenik, and even claimed control over the northern coast up to Fiume (Rijeka) except for the Venetian-ruled Zara (Zadar), and his own independent ally, Ragusa (Dubrovnik). This was only temporary, as the Hungarians and the Venetians continued their struggle over Dalmatia as soon as Tvrtko died in 1391. An internal struggle of Hungary, between king Sigismund and the Neapolitan house of Anjou, also reflected on Dalmatia: in the early 15th century, all Dalmatian cities welcomed the Neapolitan fleet except for Dubrovnik (Ragusa).

The Bosnian duke Hrvoje Vukčić Hrvatinić controlled Dalmatia for the Angevins, but later switched loyalty to Sigismund. Over the period of twenty years, this struggle weakened the Hungarian influence. In 1409, Ladislaus of Naples sold his rights over Dalmatia to Venice for 100,000 Ducats. Venice gradually took over most of Dalmatia by 1420. In 1437, Sigismund recognized Venetian rule over Dalmatia in return for 100,000 Ducats. The city of Omiš yielded to Venice in 1444. From 1448 up to 1482 the Duchy of St. Sava, led by the Kosača noble family, held Herzegovina and southern Dalmatia, from Omiš and Imotski to the Pelješac border with the Republic of Ragusa (Dubrovnik) and the Bay of Kotor. In 1482 it was absorbed by the Ottoman Empire, thus only the Republic of Ragusa remained independent.

=== The Republic of Ragusa ===
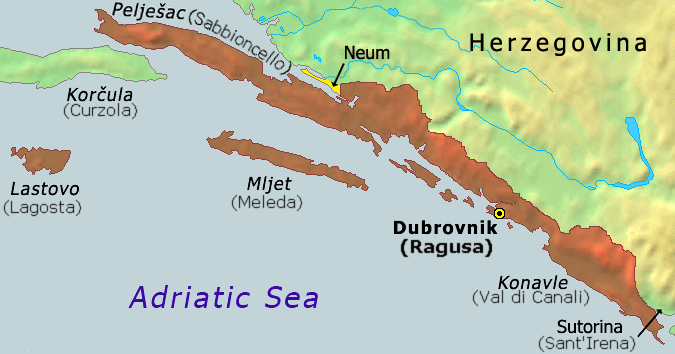
Borders of the Republic of Ragusa from 1426

The history of Ragusa (Dubrovnik) goes back to at least to the 7th century. After the fall of the Ostrogothic Kingdom, the town came under the protection of the Byzantine Empire. In the 12th and 13th centuries, Dubrovnik grew into an oligarchic republic, and benefited by becoming a commercial outpost for the Serbian and Bosnian states. After the Crusades, Dubrovnik came under the sovereignty of Venice (1205–1358). Ragusa grew by purchasing the island of Lastovo, Pelješac and Ston from Serbia. By the Peace Treaty of Zadar in 1358, Dubrovnik achieved relative independence as a vassal-state of the Kingdom of Hungary.Between the 14th century and 1808, Dubrovnik ruled itself as a free state, although it was a tributary from 1382 to 1804 of the Ottoman Empire. The Republic reached its peak in the 15th and 16th centuries, when its thalassocracy sent its ships as far as India and America, rivalling the Republic of Venice and other Italian maritime states. The city became a cradle of culture, particularly in literature written in the local Slavic language, which became a foundation stone for present day Croatian. Originally, Latin was used in official documents of the Republic. Italian came into use in the 1420s. Both languages were used in official correspondence by the Republic. The Republic was influenced by the Venetian language and the Tuscan dialect.

==== Language ====
After the fall of the Western Roman Empire, Illyrian towns on the Dalmatian coast continued to speak Latin and their language evolved relatively independent from other Romance languages, progressing towards a regional variant and finally to a distinct neo-Latin language called Dalmatian (today extinct). The earliest reference on the language dates from the 10th century and it is estimated that about 50,000 people spoke it at that time along the eastern Adriatic in the Dalmatian coast from Fiume (Rijeka) as far south as Kotor (Cattaro) in Montenegro (according to the linguist Matteo Bartoli). The Dalmatian speakers lived mainly in the coastal towns of Zadar, Trogir, Split, Dubrovnik and Kotor (Zara, Traù, Spalato, Ragusa and Cattaro in Italian and in Dalmatian), each of these cities having a local dialect, and also on the islands of Krk, Cres and Rab (Veglia, Cherso and Arbe).

Almost every city developed its own dialect, but the most important dialects we have information on are the Vegliot a northern dialect, spoken on the island of Krk (Veglia in Italian, Vikla in Dalmatian) and the Ragusan', a southern dialect, spoken at Dubrovnik (Ragusa in both Italian and Dalmatian). The dialect of Zara disappeared merging with Venetian because of the strong and long lasting influence of Republic of Venice, as did the two other dialects even to the assimilation by Slavic speakers. We know about the Dalmatian dialect of Ragusa from two letters, from 1325 and 1397, and many medieval texts, which show a language influenced heavily by Venetian. The available sources include hardly 260 Ragusan words. Surviving words include pen (bread), teta (father), chesa (house) and fachir (to do), which were quoted by an Italian, Fillipo Diversi, the head of school of Ragusa in the 1430s.

The once rival Romanic and Slavic population eventually started contributing to a common civilization, and Ragusa (Dubrovnik) was the primary example of this. According to the analysis of the anthroponyms of the Dalmatian city-states Split and Trogir in the 11th century, it is estimated that 25% of upper class and 50% of citizens of Split had Slavic/Slavicized names, while both in Trogir were predominantly Slavic/Slavicized. By the 13th century, the councilmen from Ragusan names were mixed, and in the 15th century the Ragusan literature was even written in the Slavic language (from which Croatian is directly descended), and the city was often called by its Slavic name, Dubrovnik.

==== Religion ====
The Christian schism was an important factor in the history of Dalmatia. While the Croatian-held branch of the Catholic Church in Nin was under Papal jurisdiction, they still used the Slavic liturgy. Both the Latin population of the cities and the Holy See preferred the Latin liturgy, which created tensions between different dioceses. The Croatian population preferred domestic priests, who were married and bearded, and held masses in Croatian, so they were understood.

The great schism between Eastern and Western Christianity 1054 further intensified the rift between the coastal cities and the hinterland, with some of the Slavs in the Southeastern Dalmatia preferring the Eastern Orthodoxy. Areas of today's Bosnia and Herzegovina also had an indigenous Bosnian Church which was often mistaken for Bogomils.

The Latin influence in Dalmatia was increased and the Byzantine practices were further suppressed on the general synods 1059–1060, 1066, 1075–1076 and on other local synods, notably by demoting the bishopric of Nin, installing the archbishoprics of Spalatum (Split) and Dioclea (Montenegro), and explicitly forbidding use of any liturgy other than Greek or Latin.

In the period of the rise of the Grand Principality of Serbia, the Nemanjić dynasty acquired the southern Dalmatian states by the end of the 12th century, where the population was Catholic and founded bishopric of Zahumlje with see in Ston. The Nemanjić Serbia controlled several of the southern coastal cities, notably Kotor (Cattaro) and Bar (Antivari).

==== Culture ====
Dalmatia never attained a political or racial unity and never formed as a nation, but it achieved a remarkable development of art, science and literature. Politically, the neolatin Dalmatian city-states were often isolated and compelled to either fall back on the Venetian Republic for support, or tried to make it on their own. The geographical position of the Dalmatian city states suffices to explain the relatively small influence exercised by Byzantine culture throughout the six centuries (535–1102) during which Dalmatia was part of the Eastern empire. Towards the close of this period Byzantine rule tended more and more to become merely nominal, while the influence of the Republic of Venice increased.

The medieval Dalmatia had still included much of the hinterland covered by the old Roman province of Dalmatia. However, the toponym of "Dalmatia" started to shift more towards including only the coastal, Adriatic areas, rather than the mountains inland. By the 15th century, the word "Herzegovina" would be introduced, marking the shrink of the borders of Dalmatia to the narrow littoral area.

== Early modern period ==
=== The Republic of Venice and Ottoman Empire (15th-18th century) ===
Dalmatia divided between Venetian Republic and Ottoman Empire in 1558.

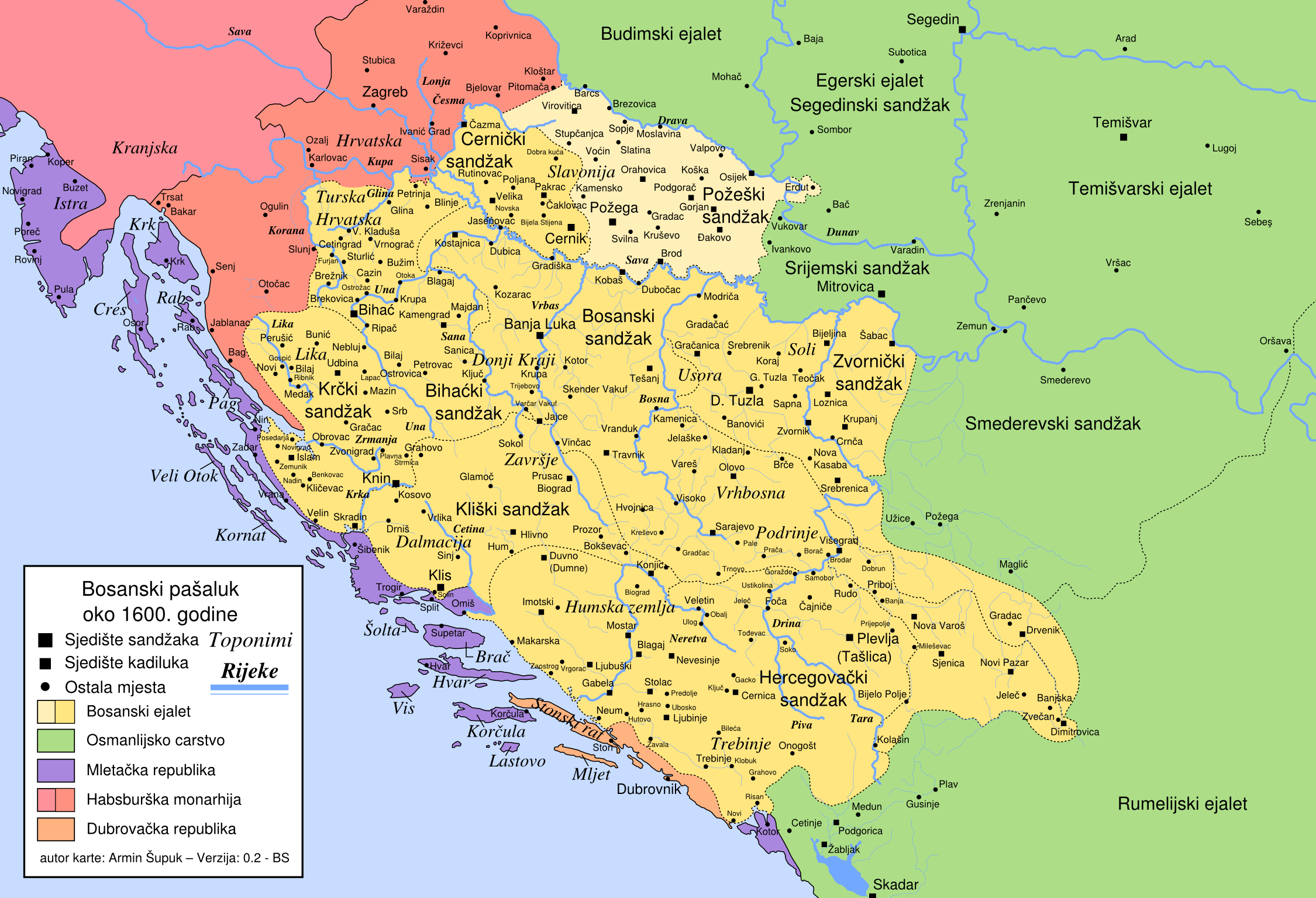
Dalmatia divided between Venetian Republic and Ottoman Bosnia Eyalet in 1600.

The Republic of Venice, from 1420 to 1797 controlled a significant part of Dalmatia (see Venetian Dalmatia). An interval of peace ensued, but meanwhile the Ottoman advance continued. During the arrival of the Ottomans, the islands and coastal part were controlled by Venice while most of the Dalmatian hinterland by the Hungarian-Croatian Kingdom. Christian kingdoms and regions in the east fell one by one, Constantinople in 1453, Serbia in 1459, neighbouring Bosnia in 1463, and Herzegovina in 1483. Dubrovnik sought safety in friendship with the invaders, and in one particular instance, actually sold two small strips of its territory (Neum and Sutorina) to the Ottomans in order to prevent land access from the Venetian territory.

In 1508 the hostile League of Cambrai compelled Venice to withdraw its garrison for home service, and after the overthrow of Hungary in 1526 the Turks were able easily to conquer the greater part of Dalmatia by 1537 (first forming Croatian vilayet in the 1520s), when the Siege of Klis ended with the fall of the Klis Fortress to the Ottomans and formation of the Sanjak of Klis which was part of the Eyalet of Bosnia. With the fall of the Hungarian-Venetian border in Dalmatia, Venetian Dalmatia now directly bordered with the Ottoman Empire. Venetians still perceived this inner hinterland as once part of Croatia calling it as "Banadego" (lands of Ban i.e. Banate). Venetian Dalmatia between 1420 and 1797 controlled the most and crucial maritime points in Eastern Adriatic, while Ottoman Dalmatia between 1499 and 1646 had entrance to the sea between Omiš and Poljica and in Obrovac.

Christian Croats from the neighbouring lands now thronged to the towns, outnumbering the Romanic population even more, and making their language the primary one. The pirate community of the "uskoks" had originally been a band of these fugitives, esp. near Senia; its exploits contributed to a renewal of war between Venice and Turkey (1571–1573). An extremely curious picture of contemporary manners is presented by the Venetian agents, whose reports on this war resemble some knightly chronicle of the Middle Ages, full of single combats, tournaments and other chivalrous adventures. They also show clearly that the Dalmatian levies far surpassed the Italian mercenaries in skill and courage. Many of these troops served abroad; at the Battle of Lepanto, for example, in 1571, a Dalmatian squadron assisted the allied fleets of Spain, Venice, Austria and the Papal States to crush the Turkish navy.

The Venetian Republic promised the peasant population of the hinterland freedom from feudal bounds in return for their military service. The Roman Catholic Church, as the religion of both the Venetians and the Croats, exerted the majority influence over the region. The Serbian Patriarchate of Peć (later known as Serbian Orthodox Church) was also significantly active in Dalmatia, but mostly in Ottoman Dalmatia where a good part of Christian population converted to Islam. Orthodox Slavs mostly came as martolos in Ottoman service, and Orthodoxy is related to the Ottoman history of the region, and Orthodox Dalmatia (as is known among Serbs) emerged due to Ottoman and Venetian conquests resulting in later confessional borders of the Catholic and Orthodox population in Dalmatia.

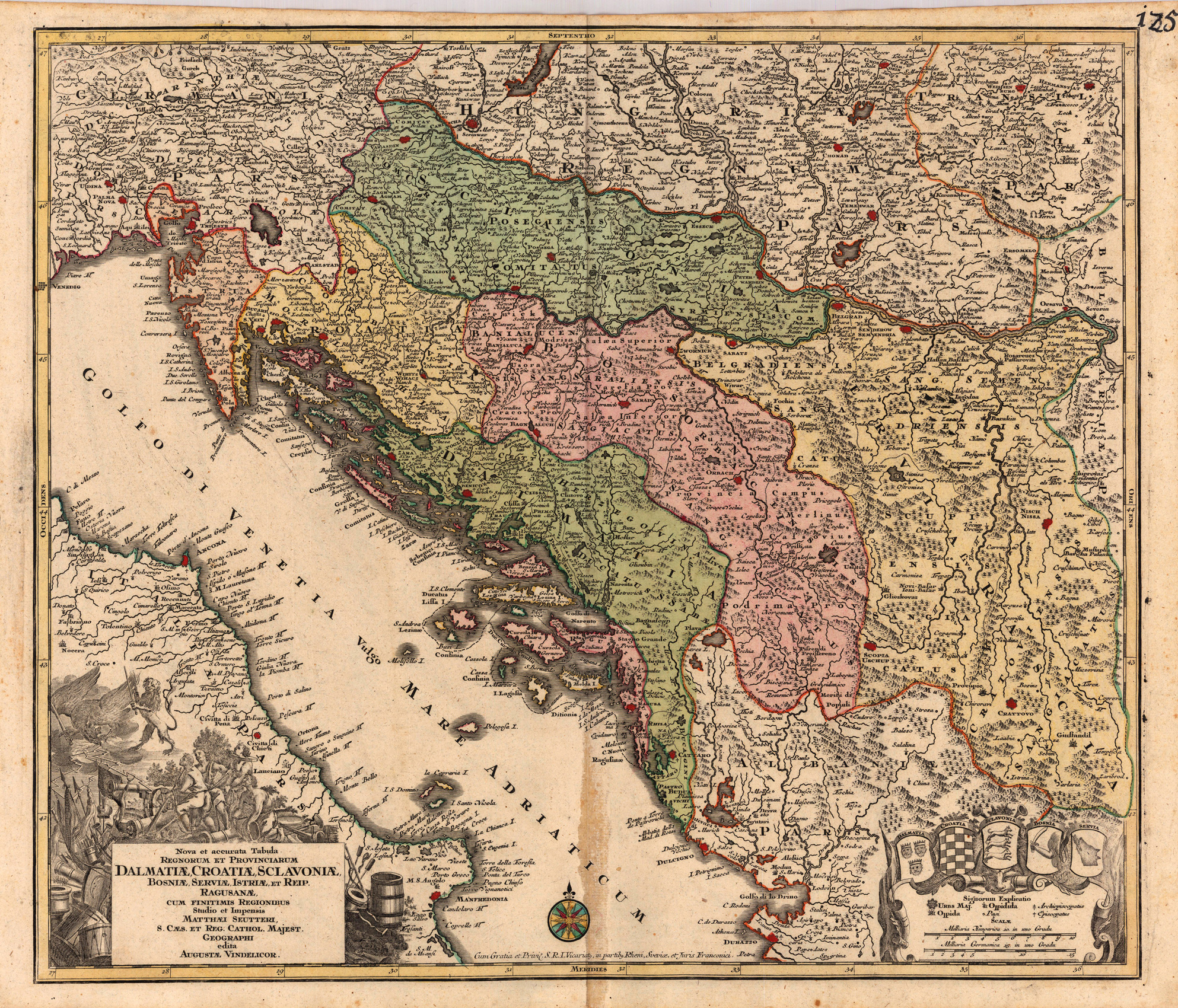
Old map of Dalmatia (green) and other Croatian lands from 1720 (not showing Ottoman conquests)

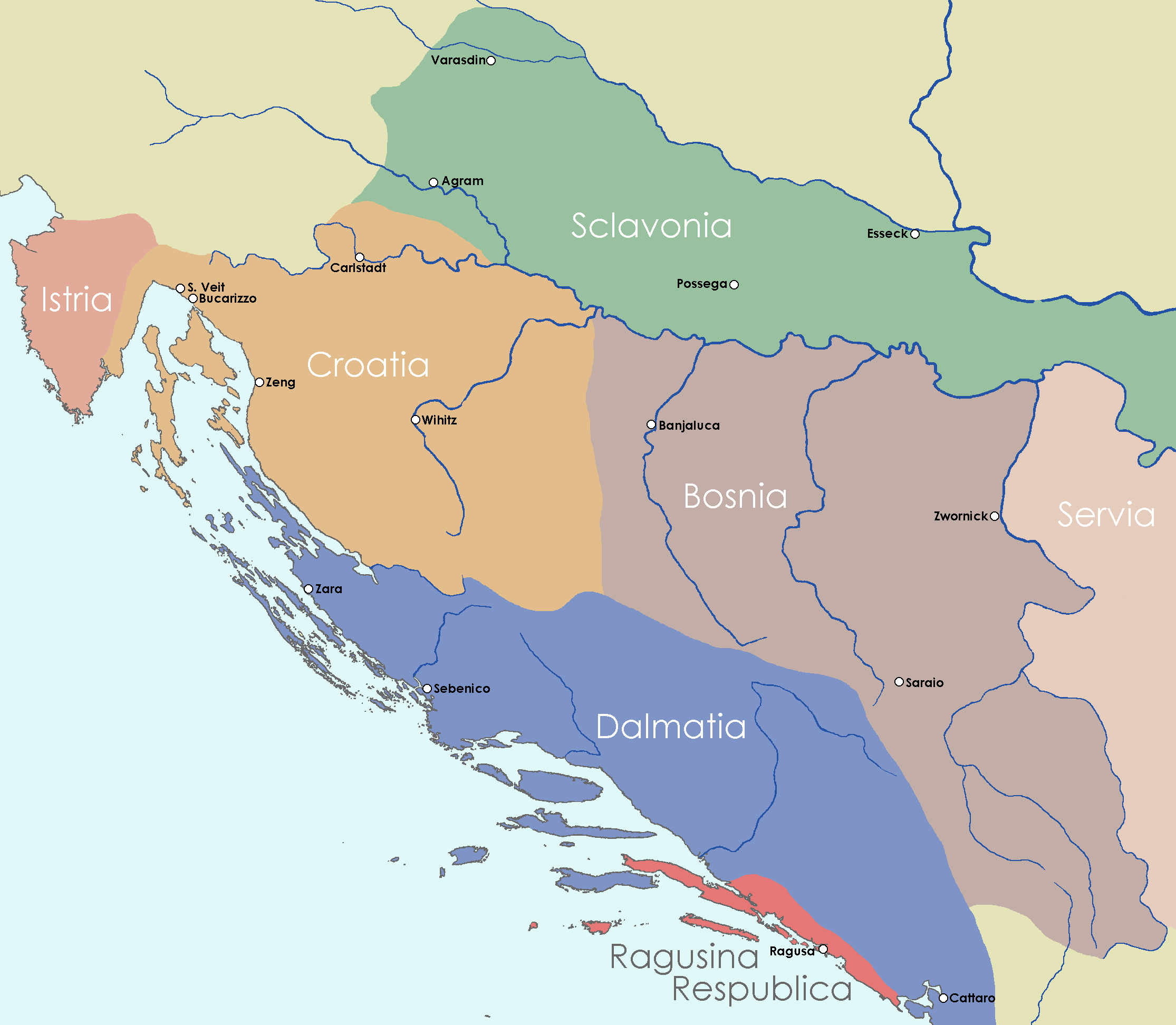
Reconstructed map of Dalmatia in 1720

During the War of Candia in 1645 - 1669 and the Great Turkish War in 1683 - 1699, and the peace of Karlowitz, Venice received almost whole of Dalmatia as far south as Ston, as well as the region beyond Ragusa, from Sutorina to Boka kotorska. After the Venetian-Turkish war 1714–1718, Venetian territorial gains were confirmed by the 1718 Treaty of Passarowitz. Dalmatia experienced a period of intense economic and cultural growth in the 18th century, given how trade routes with the hinterland were reestablished in peace. Because the Venetians were able to reclaim some of the inland territories in the north during the Turkish wars, the toponym of Dalmatia was no longer restricted to the coastline and the islands. The border between the Dalmatian hinterland and the Ottoman Bosnia and Herzegovina greatly fluctuated until the Morean War, when the Venetian capture of Knin and Sinj set much of the borderline at its current position. This period was abruptly interrupted with the fall of the Venetian republic in 1797.

== Modern era ==
=== Dalmatia in the Napoleonic era ===
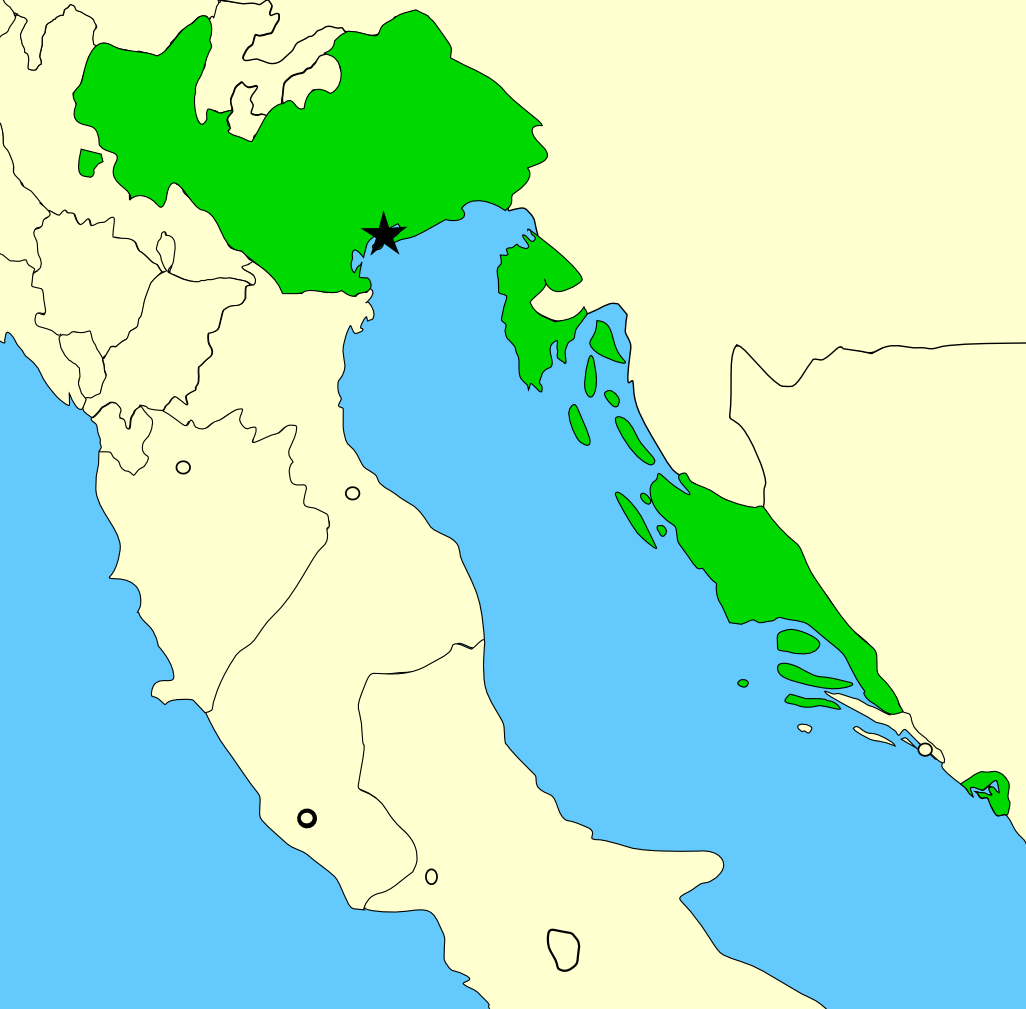
Dalmatian possessions of the Republic of Venice in 1797.

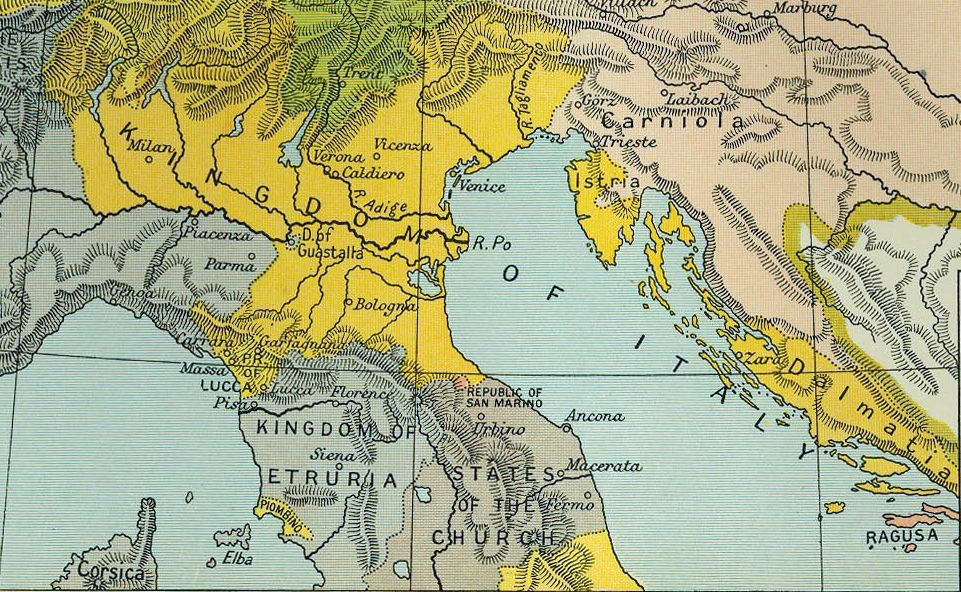
The Napoleonic Kingdom of Italy from 1806 to 1810 included Dalmatia that had belonged to Venice until 1797.

Later in 1797, in the treaty of Campo Formio, Napoleon I gave Dalmatia to Austria in return for Belgium. The republics of Ragusa (Dubrovnik) and Poljica retained their independence, and Ragusa grew rich by its neutrality during the earlier Napoleonic wars. By the Peace of Pressburg in 1805, Istria, Dalmatia and the Bay of Kotor were handed over to France.

In 1805 Napoleon created his Kingdom of Italy around the Adriatic sea, annexing to it the former Venetian Dalmatia from Istria to Cattaro (Kotor).

In 1806, the Republic of Ragusa (Dubrovnik) finally succumbed to French troops under general Marmont. The same year a Montenegrin force supported by the Russians tried to contest the French by seizing Boka Kotorska. The allied forces pushed the French to Ragusa. The Russians induced the Montenegrins to render aid and they proceeded to take the islands of Korčula and Brač but made no further progress, and withdrew in 1807 under the Treaty of Tilsit. The Republic of Ragusa was officially annexed to the Napoleonic Kingdom of Italy in 1808.

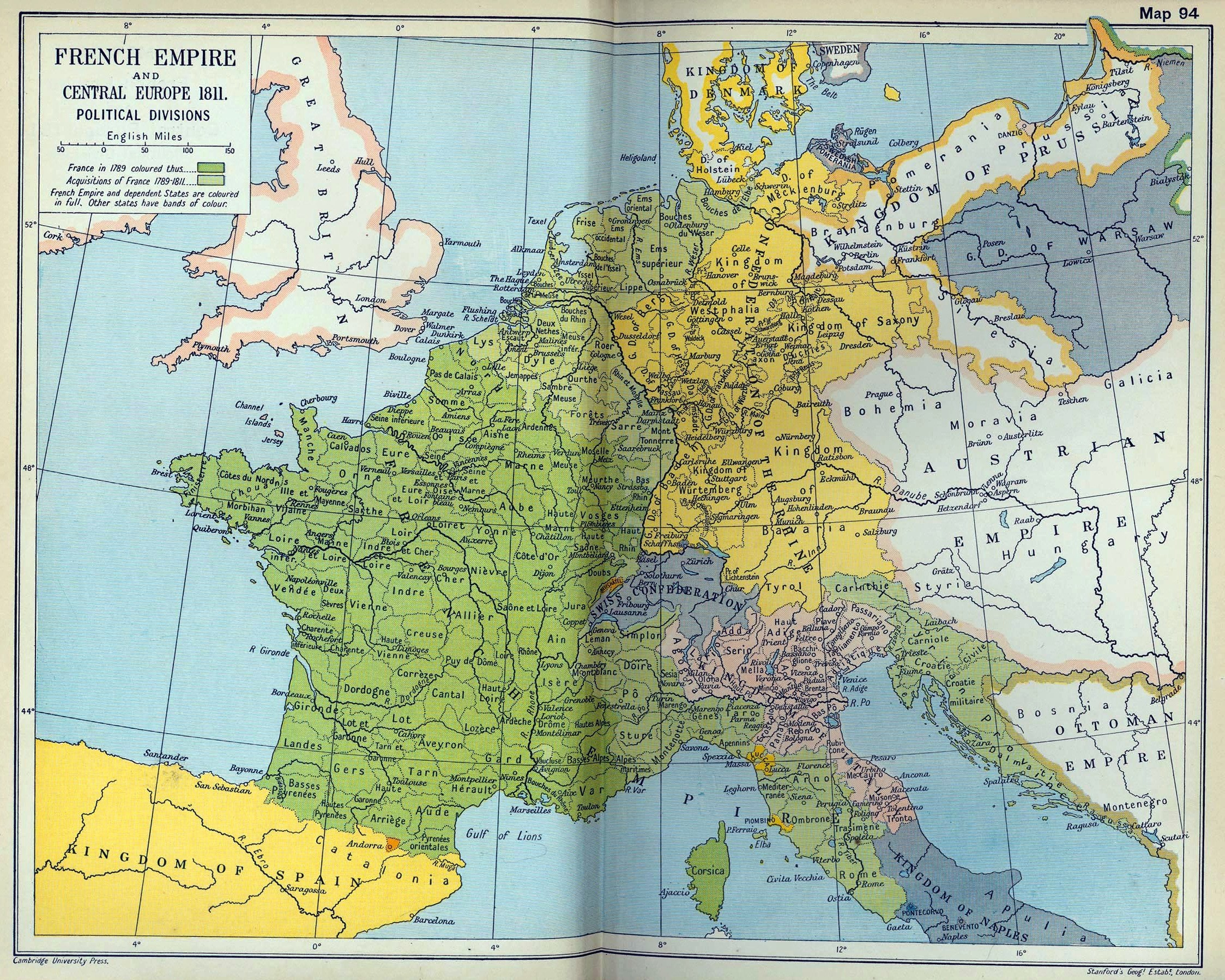
Dalmatia as a part of the Illyrian Provinces in 1811

In 1809, the War of the Fifth Coalition broke out, and French and Austrian forces also fought in the Dalmatian Campaign (1809). In the summer, Austrian forces retook Dalmatia, but this lasted only until the Treaty of Schönbrunn, when Austria ceded a number of additional provinces north of Dalmatia to France, so Napoleon removed Dalmatia from his Kingdom of Italy and created the Illyrian Provinces.

The major part of the Dalmatian population was Roman Catholic. From the Middle Ages to the 19th century, Italian and Slavic communities in Dalmatia had lived peacefully side by side because they did not know the national identification, given that they generically defined themselves as "Dalmatians", of "Romance" or "Slavic" culture.

=== Habsburg Austrian era ===
In the course of the War of the Sixth Coalition, the Austrian Empire declared war on France in 1813. The Austrians were assisted by a Royal Naval frigate squadron led by Rear-Admiral Thomas Fremantle. They made a sweep against the Dalmatian coast in a lightning campaign. Captain William Hoste in HMS Bacchante coordinated with Austrian ground troops and the 35th Regiment of Foot retaking Split and the islands of Hvar and Brac. Zara was captured in December by a force under George Cadogan and Franjo Ksaver Tomašić. Kotor, Dubrovnik and all the islands were captured by January 1814 by the Anglo-Austrians, thus completing the reconquest of the region.

Austria restored control over Dalmatia by 1815 and formed a temporary Kingdom of Illyria. In 1822, this was eliminated and Dalmatia was placed under Austrian administration. From the Middle Ages to the 19th century, Italian and Slavic communities in Dalmatia had lived peacefully side by side because they did not know the national identification, given that they generically defined themselves as "Dalmatians", of "Romance" or "Slavic" culture.

As elsewhere in 19th century Europe, nationalism emerged in Dalmatia, with the Slavic-speaking populace increasingly identifying as Croats and Serbs, and Italian-speakers as Italians. The Habsburg Empire had its own agenda in Dalmatia, that opposed the formation of the Italian state in the Revolutions of 1848 in the Italian states, but supported the development of Italian culture in Dalmatia, maintaining a delicate balance that primarily served its own interests. At the time, the vast majority of the rural population spoke Croatian while the city aristocracy spoke Italian. In the first Austrian census of 1865 Italian-speakers accounted for 12.5% of the population, including those who came from Italy and Slavs Italianized under Venetian rule The Italian-leaning high society initially promulgated the idea of a separate Dalmatian national identity under the multi-ethnic Austro-Hungarian monarchy (not necessarily unified with Italy), which, coupled with a property census that gave them disproportional political representation, sought to maintain the privileged social status they enjoyed under Venice.

In the 1860s two main political factions appeared in Dalmatia. The first was the pro-Croatian or unionist one, led by the People's Party and the Party of Rights, which advocated for a union of Dalmatia with the remaining part of Croatia that was under Hungarian administration. The second was the autonomist, pro-Italian, called the Autonomist Party. In the first election of 1861 the Autonomists won a majority, but as voting rights were expanded to citizens with less property, the Croatian parties gained the majority in 1870. Much of the disputes centered around language, with local Italian administrators, contrary to Austrian laws, declaring only Italian the official language, and Italian representatives also insisted it be the only official language in newly formed Dalmatian parliament.

Among Croatians, who constituted a majority of the inhabitants of Dalmatia. a pan-South-Slavic, Illyrian movement emerged in the first half of the 19th century. This movement aimed to create a Croatian national establishment in Austria-Hungary through linguistic and ethnic unity, and through it lay the foundation for cultural and linguistic unification of all South Slavs under the revived umbrella term Illyrian, part of the 'Croatian national revival. In the 1860s more nationalist Croatian leaders like Ante Starcević and Eugen Kvaternik saw Austria as their main enemy and espoused Croatian self-determination. In Dalmatia the increasing nationalism had the form of seeking union of Dalmatia with other Croatian lands in the Austro-Hungarian Empire, and asserting language rights for the Croatian majority, rights they saw as suppressed by the Italian-speaking elite.

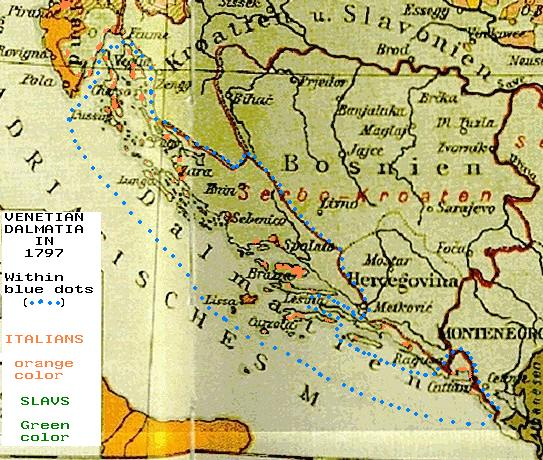
Austrian linguistic map from 1896. In green the areas where Slavs were the majority of the population, in orange the areas where Istrian Italians and Dalmatian Italians were the majority of the population. The boundaries of Venetian Dalmatia in 1797 are delimited with blue dots.

Many Dalmatian Italians looked with sympathy towards the Risorgimento movement that fought for the unification of Italy. However, after 1866, when the Veneto and Friuli regions were ceded by the Austrians to the newly formed Kingdom Italy, Dalmatia remained part of the Austro-Hungarian Empire, together with other Italian-speaking areas on the eastern Adriatic. This triggered the gradual rise of Italian irredentism among many Italians in Dalmatia, who demanded the unification of the Austrian Littoral, Fiume and Dalmatia with Italy.

Before 1859, Italian was the language of administration, education, the press, and the Austrian navy; people who wished to acquire higher social standing and separate from the Slav peasantry became Italians. In the years after 1866, Italians lost their privileges in Austria-Hungary, their assimilation of the Slavs came to an end, and they found themselves under growing pressure by other rising nations; with the rising Slav tide after 1890, italianized Slavs reverted to being Croats.

Austrian rulers found use of the racial antagonism and financed Slav schools and promoted Croatian as the official language, and many Italians chose voluntary exile. During the meeting of the Council of Ministers of 12 November 1866, Emperor Franz Joseph I of Austria outlined a wide-ranging project aimed at the Germanization or Slavization of the areas of the empire with an Italian presence:

His Majesty expressed the precise order that action be taken decisively against the influence of the Italian elements still present in some regions of the Crown and, appropriately occupying the posts of public, judicial, masters employees as well as with the influence of the press, work in South Tyrol, Dalmatia and Littoral for the Germanization and Slavization of these territories according to the circumstances, with energy and without any regard. His Majesty calls the central offices to the strong duty to proceed in this way to what has been established.

— Franz Joseph I of Austria, Council of the Crown of 12 November 1866

Dalmatia, especially its maritime cities, once had a substantial Italian-speaking population (Dalmatian Italians). According to Austrian censuses, the Italian speakers in Dalmatia formed 12.5% of the population in 1865, but this was reduced to 2.8% in 1910. The Italian population in Dalmatia was concentrated in the major coastal cities. In the city of Split in 1890 there were 1,971 Dalmatian Italians (9% of the population), in Zadar 7,672 (27%), in Šibenik 1,090 (5%), in Kotor 646 (12%) and in Dubrovnik 356 (3%). In other Dalmatian localities, according to Austrian censuses, Italians experienced a sudden decrease: in the twenty years 1890-1910, in Rab they went from 225 to 151, in Vis from 352 to 92, in Pag from 787 to 23, completely disappearing in almost all inland locations.

While Slavic-speakers made up 80-95% of the Dalmatia populace, only Italian language schools existed until 1848, and due to restrictive voting laws, the Italian-speaking aristocratic minority retained political control of Dalmatia. Only after Austria liberalised elections in 1870, allowing more majority Slavs to vote, did Croatian parties gain control. Croatian finally became an official language in Dalmatia in 1883, along with Italian. Yet minority Italian-speakers continued to wield strong influence, since Austria favoured Italians for government work, thus in the Austrian capital of Dalmatia, Zara, the proportion of Italians continued to grow, making it the only Dalmatian city with an Italian majority.

The political alliances in Dalmatia shifted over time. At the beginning, the unionists and autonomists were allied together, against centralism of Vienna. After a while, when the national question came to prominence, they split. A third splintering happened when the local Orthodox Serb population, who according to an analysis of the 1857 census, counted around 77,500 or 18.5% of total population, heard of the ideas of unification of all Serbs through of the Serbian Orthodox Church, which acted as Serbia's agit-prop agency abroad. As a result, Serbian Orthodox population started to side with the autonomists and irredentists rather than the unionists.

== 20th century ==
=== First half of the 20th century ===
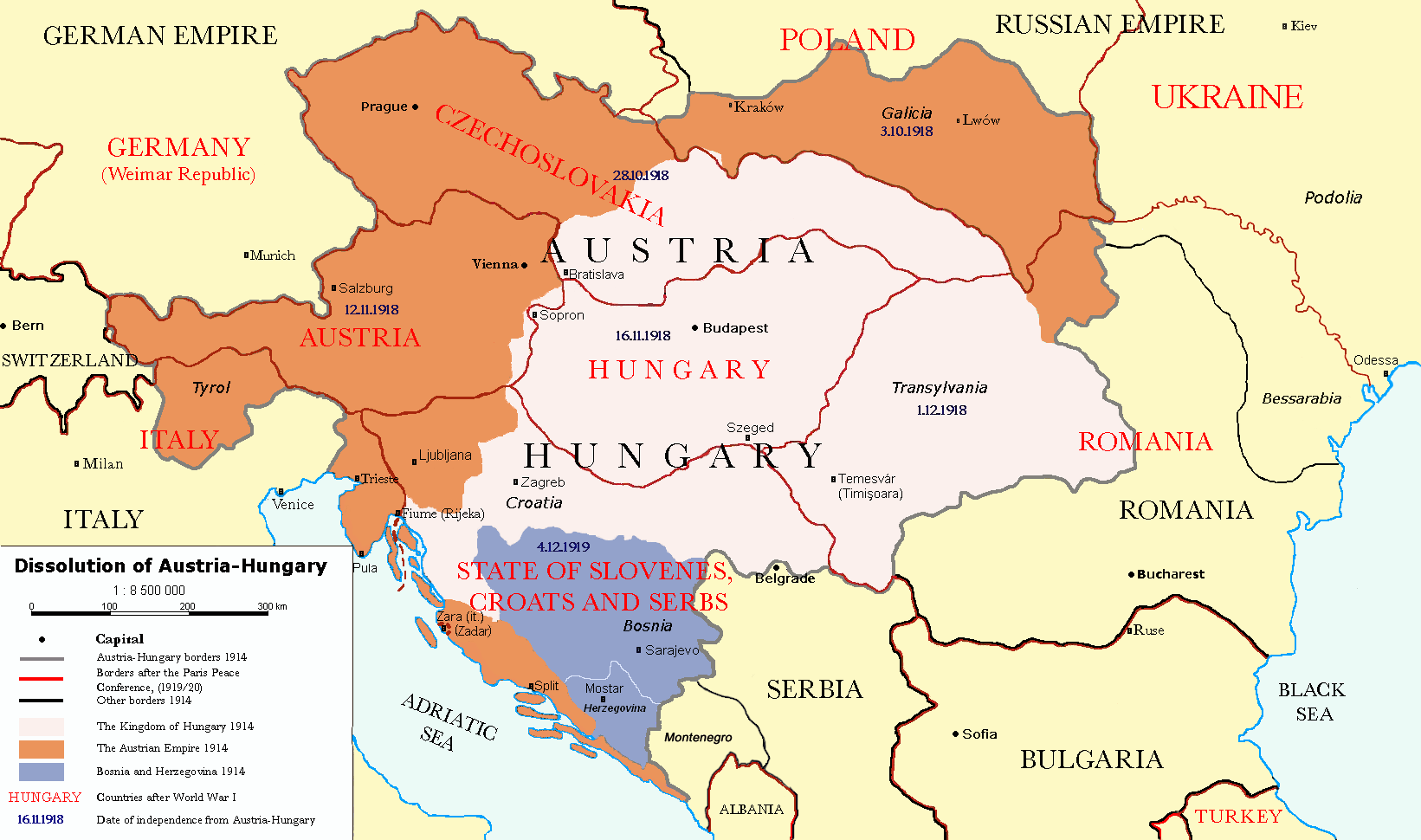
The end of Austria-Hungary after the Treaty of Saint Germain (1919) and the Treaty of Trianon (1920) Border of Austria–Hungary in 1914 Borders in 1914 Borders in 1920 Empire of Austria in 1914 Kingdom of Hungary in 1914 Bosnia and Herzegovina in 1914

In 1905, a dispute arose in the Austrian Imperial Council over whether Austria should pay for Dalmatia. It has been argued that in the conclusion of the April Laws is written "given by Banus Count Keglevich of Bužim", which explained the historical affiliation of Dalmatia to Hungary. Two years later Dalmatia elected representatives to the Austrian Imperial Council.

Until 1909, both Italian and Croatian were recognized as official languages in Dalmatia. After 1909, Italian lost its official status, thus it could no longer be used in the public and administrative sphere.

Dalmatia was a strategic region during World War I that both Italy and Serbia intended to seize from Austria-Hungary. Italy joined the Triple Entente Allies in 1915 upon agreeing to the London Pact that guaranteed Italy the right to annex the northern of Dalmatia in exchange for Italy's participation on the Allied side. From 5 to 6 November 1918, Italian forces were reported to have reached Vis, Lastovo, Šibenik, and other localities on the Dalmatian coast. At the end of hostilities in November 1918, the Italian military had seized control of the entire portion of Dalmatia that had been guaranteed to Italy by the London Pact, and by 17 November, it had seized Fiume as well. In 1918, Admiral Enrico Millo declared himself the Italian governor of Dalmatia. The Italian nationalist Gabriele d'Annunzio supported the seizure of Dalmatia and proceeded to Zadar in an Italian warship in December 1918.

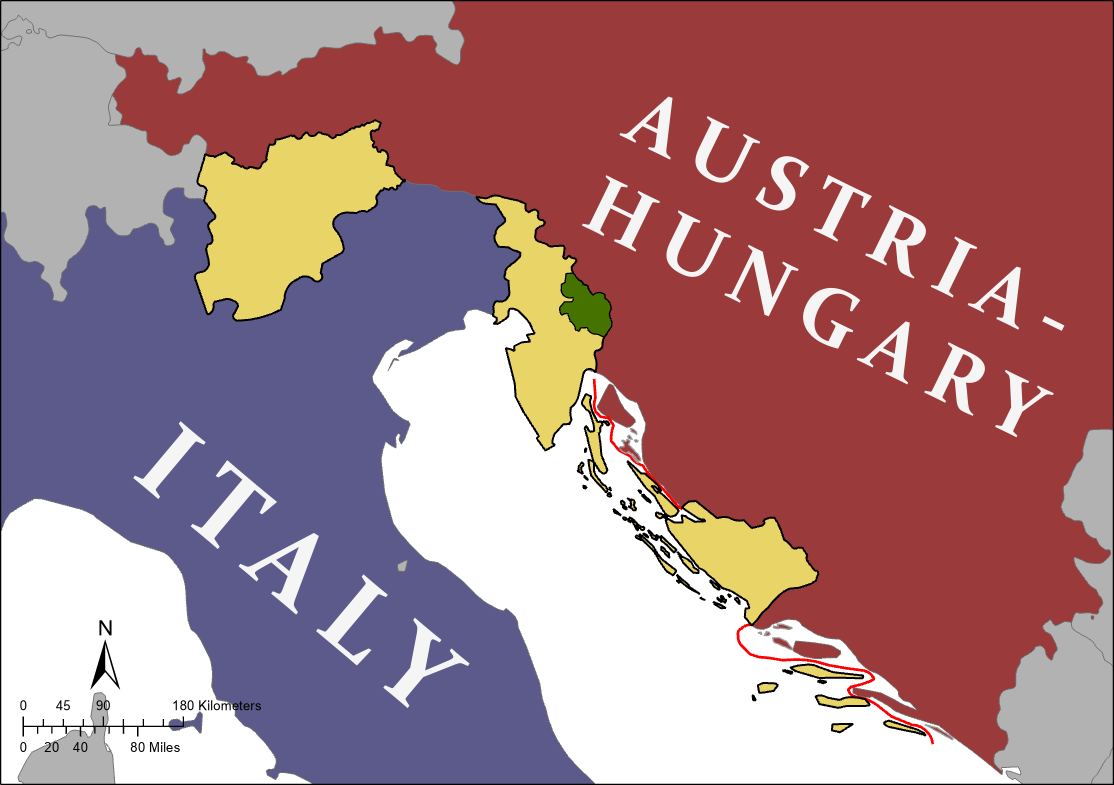
Territories promised to Italy by the London Pact (1915), i.e. Trentino-Alto Adige, the Julian March and Dalmatia (tan), and the Snežnik Plateau area (green). Dalmatia, after the WWI, however, was not assigned to Italy but to Yugoslavia

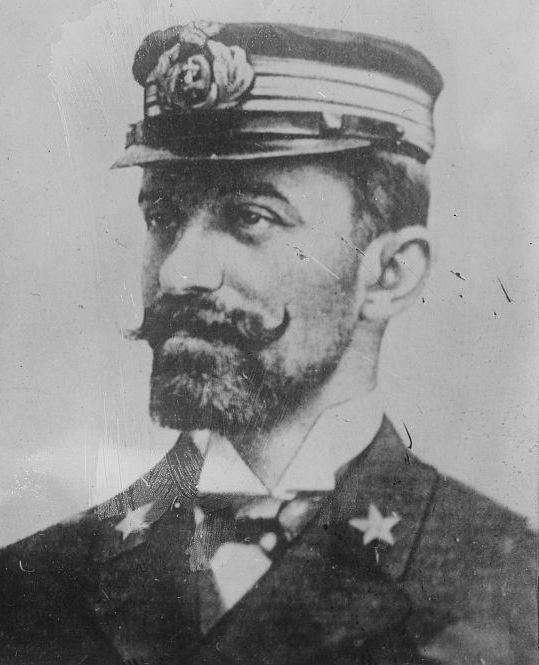
Enrico Millo, the first governor of the first Italian Governatorate of Dalmatia (1918–1920)

The ships of the Italian Royal Navy occupied the main Dalmatian ports, where they made contact with the headquarters of the Fasci nazionali, i.e. the local sections of the Italian political party expression of the dissident Italian fascist movement. Following the withdrawal of the Austrian army from Dalmatia, the Yugoslav National Council, which was formed in Zagreb awaiting the union of Croatia with Serbia, established a provisional government of Dalmatia which extended from Split to Zadar. In Zadar, the former mayor Luigi Ziliotto, who belonged to the Italian-Dalmatianist Autonomist Party, organized a local government that opposed the Slavic governorship, proclaiming the authority of the Fascio nazionale over the municipality of Zadar, investing it with the powers previously held by the Zadar municipal council dissolved in 1916.

On 31 October 1918, the Kingdom of Italy, with the consent of the Allies, militarily occupied Dalmatia, including many areas not promised by the London Pact but provided by the Armistice of Villa Giusti between the Kingdom of Italy and Austria-Hungary, which foresaw the end of the war and the surrender of the latter. On 4 November 1918, the Italian Royal Navy occupied the islands of Vis, Lastovo, Molat, and Korčula, where the Yugoslav national committees offered no armed resistance. Also on 4 November 1918, the ship that docked in Zadar was welcomed by Luigi Ziliotto, amidst the exultation of the Dalmatian Italians of the city. On the Yugoslav side, there were only diplomatic protests. In the following days the situation around Zadar changed, with the Yugoslavs starting to organize themselves militarily in the areas surrounding the city. The Italian military occupation of Šibenik, city not included in the London pact, was slightly more difficult, given the hostility of the Croatian population. The Italian Royal Navy then continued to occupy the Dalmatian coast, continuing southwards, arriving, on 9 November 1918, at Cape Planka on behalf of the Allies.

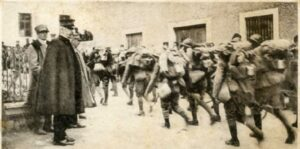
Enrico Millo inspects the Italian troops arriving in Šibenik (1918)

All the other Dalmatian islands were occupied during November. For example, among the largest, Hvar on 13 November, and Pag on 21 November. In Cres and Lošinj there was an enthusiastic welcome from the Italian Dalmatians who lived on the two islands. On 26 November, the Italian Royal Navy also occupied Krk and Rab, islands not included in the London Pact. The main pro-Yugoslav element that opposed the Italian occupation was the local clergy, so much so that the Italian authorities decided to expel the bishop of Krk, Anton Mahnič, who established and led the Croatian Catholic Movement.

Despite the fact that there were only a few thousand Italian-speakers in Dalmatia after the constant decrease that occurred in previous decades, Italian irredentists continued to lay claim to all of Dalmatia. In 1927 Italy signed an agreement with the Croatian fascist, terrorist Ustaše organization. The Ustaše agreed that once they gained power, they will cede to Italy additional territory in Dalmatia and the Bay of Kotor, while renouncing all Croatian claims to Istria, Rijeka, Zadar and the Adriatic Islands.

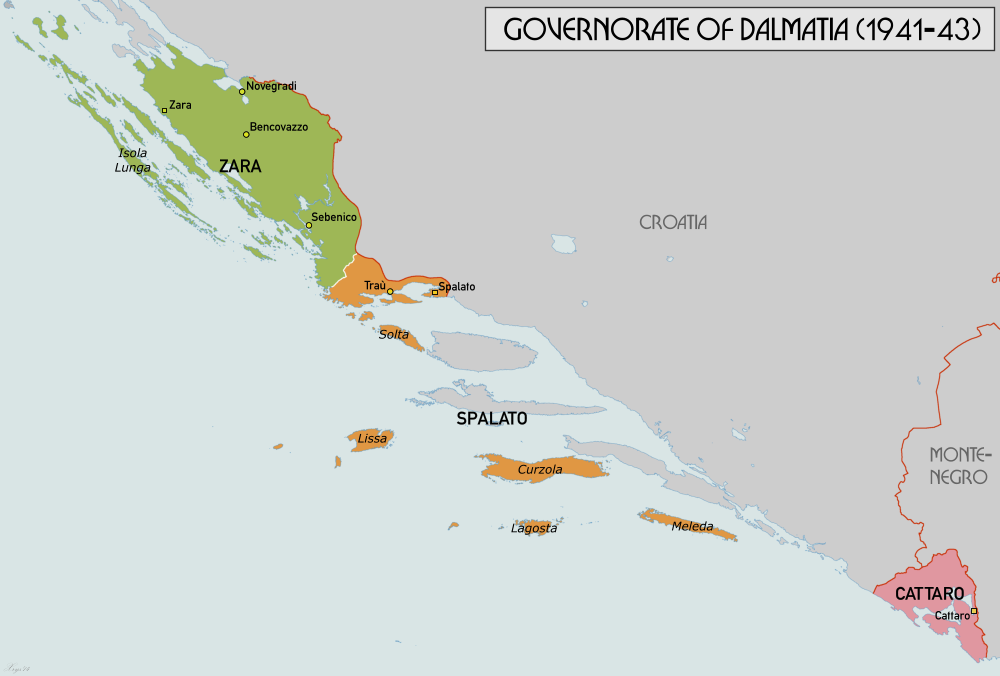
Map of the second Italian Governatorate of Dalmatia (1941–1943) showing the province of Zara, the province of Spalato and the province of Cattaro

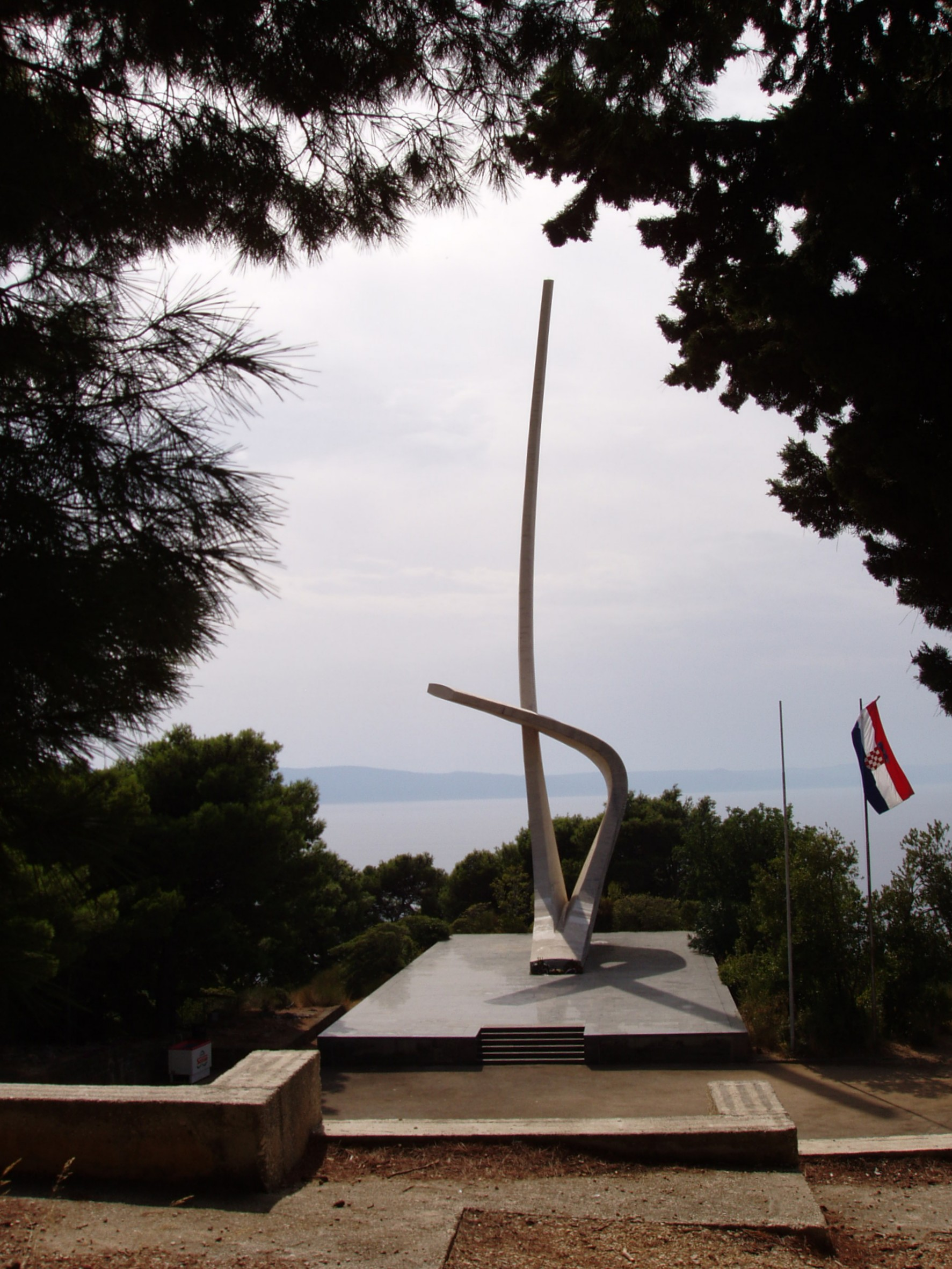
The Seagull Wings monument in Podgora, dedicated to the fallen sailors of the Yugoslav Partisan Navy

In 1922, the territory of the former Kingdom of Dalmatia was divided into two provinces, the Oblast of Split and the Oblast of Dubrovnik. In 1929, the Littoral Banovina, a province of the Kingdom of Yugoslavia, was formed. Its capital was Split, and it included most of Dalmatia and parts of present-day Bosnia and Herzegovina. The southern parts of Dalmatia were in Zeta Banovina, from the Bay of Kotor to Pelješac peninsula including Dubrovnik. In 1939, Littoral Banovina was joined with Sava Banovina (and with smaller parts of other banovinas) to form a new province named the Banovina of Croatia. The same year, the ethnic Croatian areas of the Zeta Banovina from the Bay of Kotor to Pelješac, including Dubrovnik, were merged with a new Banovina of Croatia.

During World War II, in 1941, Nazi Germany, Fascist Italy, Hungary, and Bulgaria occupied Yugoslavia, redrawing their borders to include former parts of the Yugoslavian state. A new Nazi puppet state, the Independent State of Croatia (NDH), was created. With the Treaties of Rome, the NDH agreed to cede to Italy Dalmatian territory, creating the second Governorate of Dalmatia, from north of Zadar to south of Split, with inland areas, plus nearly all the Adriatic islands and Gorski Kotar. Italy then annexed these territories, while all the remainder of southern Croatia, including the entire coast, were placed under Italian occupation. Italy also appointed an Italian, Prince Aimone, Duke of Aosta, as king of Croatia.

Italy proceeded to Italianize the annexed areas of Dalmatia. Place names were Italianized, and Italian was made the official language in all schools, churches and government administration. All Croatian cultural societies were banned, while Italians took control of all key mineral, industrial and business establishments. Italian policies prompted resistance by Dalmatians, many joined the Partisans. This led to further Italian repressive measures - shooting of civilian hostages, burning of villages, confiscation of properties. Italians took many civilians to concentration camps - altogether, some 80,000 Dalmatians, 12% of the population, passed through Italian concentration camps.

Many Croats moved from the Italian-occupied area and took refuge in the satellite state of Croatia, which became the battleground for a guerrilla war between the Axis and the Yugoslav Partisans. Following the surrender of Italy in 1943, much of Italian-controlled Dalmatia was liberated by the Partisans, then taken over by German forces in a brutal campaign, who then returned control to the puppet Independent State of Croatia. Vis Island remained in Partisan hands, while Zadar, Rijeka, Istria, Cres, Lošinj, Lastovo and Palagruža became part of the German Operationszone Adriatisches Küstenland. The Partisans liberated Dalmatia in 1944, and with that Zadar, Rijeka, Istria, Cres, Lošinj, Lastovo and Palagruža became reunited with Croatia. After 1945, most of the remaining Dalmatian Italians fled the region (350,000 Italians escaped from Istria and Dalmatia in the Istrian-Dalmatian exodus). Currently there are only 300 Dalmatian Italians in the Croatian Dalmatia and 500 Dalmatian Italians in coastal Montenegro. After World War II, Dalmatia became part of the People's Republic of Croatia, part of the Federative People's Republic of Yugoslavia.

The territory of the former Kingdom of Dalmatia was divided between two federal republics of Yugoslavia and most of the territory went to Croatia, leaving only the Bay of Kotor to Montenegro. When Yugoslavia dissolved in 1991, those borders were retained and remain in force. During the Croatian War of Independence, most of Dalmatia was a battleground between the Government of Croatia and the Yugoslav People's Army (JNA), which aided the proto-state of Serbian Krajina, with much of the northern part of the region around Knin and the far south around, but not including, Dubrovnik being placed under the control of Serb forces. Croatia did regain the southern territories in 1992 but did not regain the north until Operation Storm in 1995. After the war, a number of towns and municipalities in the region were designated Areas of Special State Concern.

=== Breakup of Yugoslavia ===
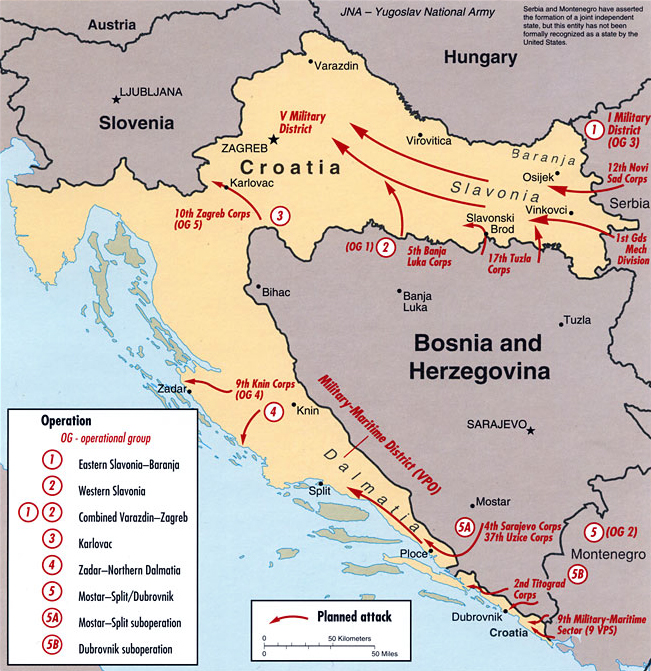
Map of the strategic offensive plan of the Yugoslav People's Army (JNA) in 1991 as interpreted by the US Central Intelligence Agency

In 1990, when Yugoslavia began to disintegrate, Croatian leadership announced their intention to declare independence, which they would indeed declare in 1991. The first Dalmatian battlefields of what would later be called the Homeland war (Domovinski rat) appeared in sections of northern Dalmatia, where there lived a significant population of Serbs. They rebelled, under encouragement and with assistance from a variety of Serbian nationalist circles, and organized their own SAO Kninska Krajina and started the so-called Log Revolution. The center of this restive area was in the northern Dalmatian town of Knin.

This Serb-held region later morphed into the SAO Krajina, and later yet it would become the Republic of Serbian Krajina (RSK), combined with other Serb-held regions across Croatia. The establishment of the RSK was helped by the Yugoslav People's Army (JNA), as well as paramilitary troops that came from Serbia, Bosnia and Herzegovina and Montenegro. The Serbian forces had a prevalence in equipment and munitions because of JNA support, and they proceeded to commit various acts of terrorism, including shelling attacks on civilian targets.

The Yugoslav People's Army operated from their barracks, that were mostly positioned in bigger cities and strategically important points. In some bigger cities JNA had built large residential blocs, and in the opening stages of the war it was believed that those buildings would be used by sharpshooters or for reconnaissance purposes.

The battle for the control of Dalmatia during the Croatian War of Independence was fought on three main fronts:

- the land front between Knin and the cities of Zadar, Šibenik and Sinj - see Operation Coast-91
- the sea front near the city of Split - see Battle of the Dalmatian channels
- the land front near the border with Montenegro and Herzegovina - see Siege of Dubrovnik
Occupied areas in Croatia (January 1992)

First attempts to take over JNA facilities occurred in August in Sinj and failed, but the major action took place in September 1991. Croatian Army and police were then more successful, although most of the objects taken were repair shops, warehouses and similar facilities, either poorly defended or commanded by officers sympathetic to the Croatian cause. Major bases, commanded by die-hard officers and manned by reservists from Montenegro and Serbia, became the object of standoffs that usually ended with JNA personnel and equipment being evacuated under supervision of EEC observers. This process was completed shortly after the Sarajevo armistice in January 1992.

All non-Serb population was ethnically cleansed from controlled areas, notably the villages of Škabrnja (Škabrnja massacre) and Kijevo (siege of Kijevo). Croatian refugees, tens of thousands of them, found shelter in many of the Dalmatian coastal towns where they were placed in empty tourist facilities.

On 2 May 1991, the 1991 anti-Serb riot in Zadar happened, in which 168 Serb-owned shops were looted by Croatian civilians to stop new Serbian terrorist actions against non-Serb population on that area.

By early 1992, the military positions were mostly entrenched, and further expansion of the RSK was stopped. The Serbian forces continued terrorist actions by way of random shelling of Croatian cities, and this continued occasionally over the next four years.

Besides the northern hinterland that bordered with Bosnia and Herzegovina, the Yugoslav People's Army also occupied sections of southern Dalmatia around Dubrovnik, as well as the islands of Vis and Lastovo. These lasted until 1992.

The United Nations Protection Force (UNPROFOR) was deployed throughout the UNPA zones, including those in northern Dalmatia, as well as on Prevlaka.

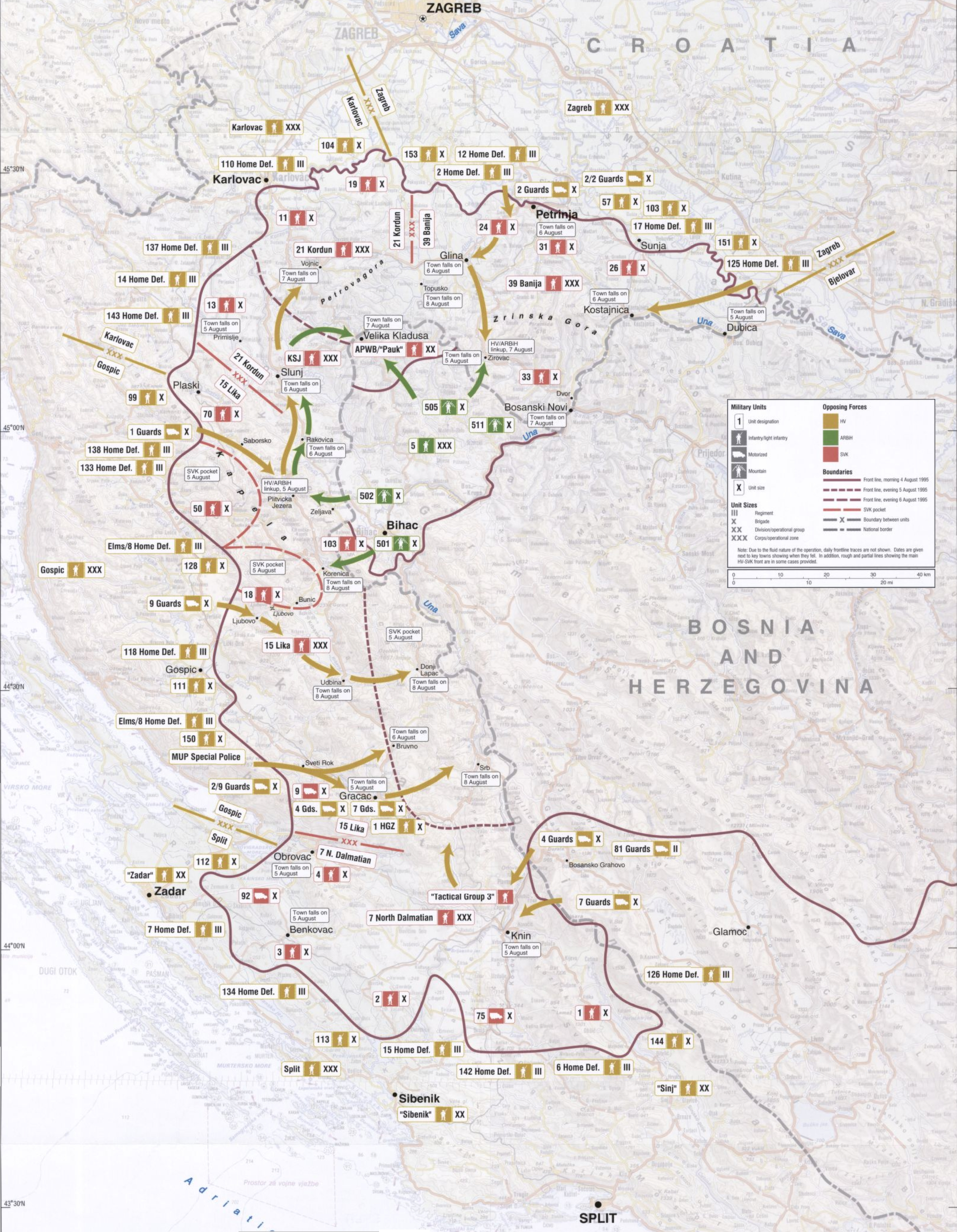
Operation Storm restored Croatian control over northern Dalmatia.

The Croatian government gradually restored control over all of Dalmatia, in the following military operations:

- September 1991: September War for Šibenik - successful defence of Šibenik from JNA onslaught and takeover of JNA bases in the area.
- May and July 1992: Operation Tiger, JNA was forced to retreat from Vis, Lastovo, Mljet and areas around Dubrovnik.
- July 1992: Miljevci Heights in Šibenik hinterland, near Drniš, were liberated in the Miljevci Plateau incident
- January 1993: Operation Maslenica, Croatian forces liberated Zadar and Biograd hinterland.
- In August 1995 Croatian forces conducted Operation Storm, ending Krajina and restoring Croatian sovereignty to international recognised borders.

During Operation Storm a majority of Serb population from Krajina left their homes, while minority of those who stayed. Homes left by ethnic Serbs were taken over by ethnic Croatian refugees from Bosnia-Herzegovina with the help and encouragement of Croatian authorities. Through the past decade, number of ethnic Serb refugees have returned and gradually reverted demographic results of war in certain areas, although it is very unlikely that their proportion in region's population will ever reach pre-war levels.

== 21st century ==
The war suffering in Dalmatia was among the highest compared to the other Croatian regions, particularly in the Dalmatian hinterland, where much of the infrastructure was ruined. The tourism industry - previously the most important source of income - was deeply affected by negative publicity and did not properly recover until the late 1990s.

The Dalmatian population in general suffered a dramatic drop in living standard which created a chasm between Dalmatia and relatively more prosperous northern sections of Croatia. This chasm reflected in extreme nationalism enjoying visibly higher levels of support in Dalmatia than in the rest of Croatia, which embraced a more moderate course.

This phenomenon manifested not only in Dalmatia being a reliable stronghold for the Croatian Democratic Union and other Croatian right-wing parties, but also in mass protests against Croatian Army generals being prosecuted for war crimes. Indictment against General Mirko Norac in early 2001 drew 150,000 people to the streets of Split - which is arguably the largest protest in the history of modern Croatia.

== See also ==
- Dalmatia
- History of Croatia
- Italianization
