= Gusići =

Gusići may refer to:

- Gusići, Bosnia and Herzegovina, a village near Goražde
- Gusić family, one of the medieval Croatian noble families
