= Trpimir =

Trpimir is a Croatian masculine given name. Notable people with the name include:

- Trpimir I of Croatia (died c. 864), medieval Croatian duke
- Trpimir II of Croatia (died c. 935), medieval Croatian king
- Trpimir Kutle (born 1976), Croatian swimmer
- Trpimir Macan (born 1935), Croatian historian and lexicographer
