= Miroslav, King of Croatia =

King of Croatia

Miroslav
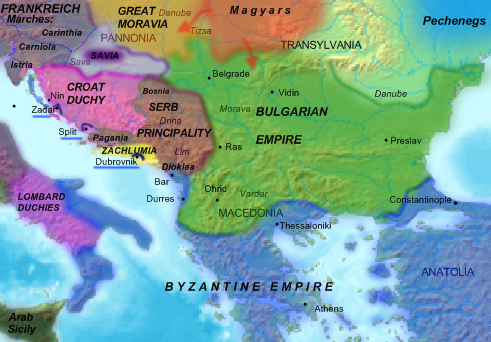
- Map of Miroslav's Croatia

King of Croatia
- Reign: 945–949
- Predecessor: Krešimir I
- Successor: Michael Krešimir II
- Died: 949
- Spouse: Marguerite
- Dynasty: Trpimirović
- Father: Krešimir I
- Religion: Christianity

Miroslav (Latin: Miroslaus) was the King of Croatia from 945 until his death in 949 and a member of the Trpimirović dynasty.

== Reign ==
He was the oldest son of Krešimir I and succeeded him as king in 945. During his reign, Croatia suffered a civil war and the Croatian navy was reduced to only 30 ships, while the infantry and cavalry also had losses. Miroslav was finally killed by Pribina, Ban of Croatia in 949, and his younger brother, Michael Krešimir II, succeeded him as king.

== See also ==
- List of rulers of Croatia

== Sources ==
- Horvat, Rudolf (1924). "24. Nasljednici kralja Tomislava". Povijest Hrvatske I. (od najstarijeg doba do g. 1657.) (in Croatian).
- Jadrijević, Ante (1967). "Smrt hrvatskih kraljeva Miroslava i Zvonimira" (PDF). Church in the World (in Croatian). 2 (1). Catholic Faculty of Theology, University of Split: 45–59.

Regnal titles
Preceded by Krešimir I	King of Croatia; 945–949	Succeeded by Michael Krešimir II
