= Krešimir I =

King of Croatia

King of Croatia
- Reign: 935–945
- Predecessor: Trpimir II
- Successor: Miroslav
- Died: 945
- Spouse: Domaslava
- Issue: Miroslav; Michael Krešimir II
- Dynasty: Trpimirović
- Father: Trpimir II
- Religion: Christianity

Krešimir I was king of Croatia from 935 until his death in 945. He was a member of the Trpimirović dynasty.

== Reign ==
Little is known about the reign of Krešimir I. He succeeded Trpimir II as king in around 935. According to De Administrando Imperio, Krešimir managed to maintain Croatia's military power.

After his death his two sons, first Miroslav and later Michael Krešimir II, became kings, after a long struggle for succession.

== Footnotes ==
Regnal titles
Preceded by Trpimir II	King of Croatia; 935–945	Succeeded by Miroslav
