= Domaslava =

10th-century Croatian queen

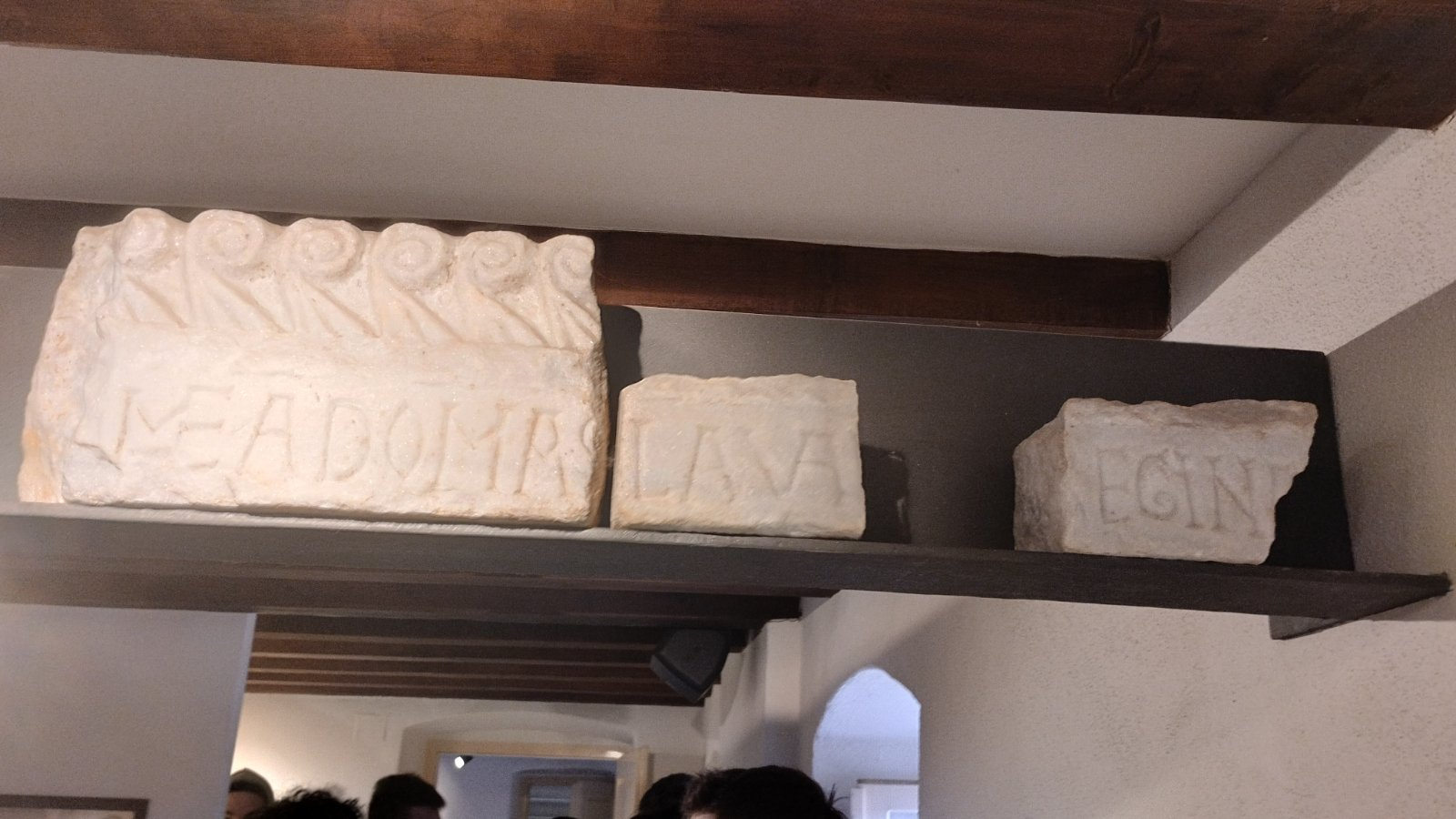
Inscription of queen Domaslava on Klis fortress.

Domaslava was a queen consort of the Kingdom of Croatia in the first half of the 10th century. It is the oldest mention of a name of a Croatian queen found to date.

== The stone fragments ==
The only known source of her existence is on the fragments of the dedication inscription on the altar partition in the Church of St. Vitus in Klis.

According to Neven Budak, the Latin inscription of the fragment reads:

- “[Ego ... Rex Croat]orum filiu[s ... regis una cum coniuge] mea Domaslava regina [hoc opus fieri iussi]”

English translation:

- "I... king of Croats, son of the king ..., along with my Queen Domaslava I ordered this work to be done."

It is theorized that Domaslava may have been the mother of King Michael Krešimir II (949–969), or of the other kings that preceded him, because they identities of later kings'-mothers are known. It is known, for instance that Queen Helen of Zadar (949–969) was the wife of Michael Krešimir II and the mother of King Stephen Držislav (969–997).
