= Gusići, Bosnia and Herzegovina =

Gusići
- Village
- Location within Bosnia and Herzegovina
- Coordinates: 43°41′32″N 18°46′30″E
- Country: Bosnia and Herzegovina
- Entity: Federation of Bosnia and Herzegovina
- Canton: Bosnian-Podrinje Goražde
- Municipality: Goražde

Area
  - Total: 0.28 sq mi (0.73 km^{2})

Population (2013)
  - Total: 15
  - Density: 53/sq mi (21/km^{2})
- Time zone: UTC+1 (CET)
  - Summer (DST): UTC+2 (CEST)

Gusići is a village in the municipality of Goražde, Bosnia and Herzegovina.

== Demographics ==
According to the 2013 census, its population was 15.

Ethnicity in 2013
Ethnicity	Number	Percentage
Bosniaks	14	93.3%
other/undeclared	1	6.7%
Total	15	100%
