= Trpimir II =

King of Croatia
- Reign: c. 928–935
- Predecessor: Tomislav
- Successor: Krešimir I
- Died: c. 935
- Issue: Krešimir I
- Dynasty: Trpimirović
- Father: Muncimir
- Religion: Christianity

Trpimir II was an alleged King of Croatia from 928 to 935. He was presumably from the Trpimirović dynasty, however, he's not mentioned in historical sources, being a historiographical invention.

In the old chronology (per Ferdo Šišić), Trpimir II would be the son of Duke Muncimir and younger brother of King Tomislav. De Administrando Imperio mentions that in the time of Terpimer (whose identity is disputed to be Trpimir I from the 9th century, or Trpimir II), the Duchy or Kingdom of Croatia had a significant merchant fleet that traded across the entire Adriatic Sea. The mentioned Terpimer was succeeded by his son Krešimir I.

== See also ==
- List of rulers of Croatia

Trpimir II House of Trpimirović
Regnal titles
Preceded by Tomislav	King of Croatia c. 928-935	Succeeded by Krešimir I
