= Ivan Paleček =

Croatian politician (1868–1945)

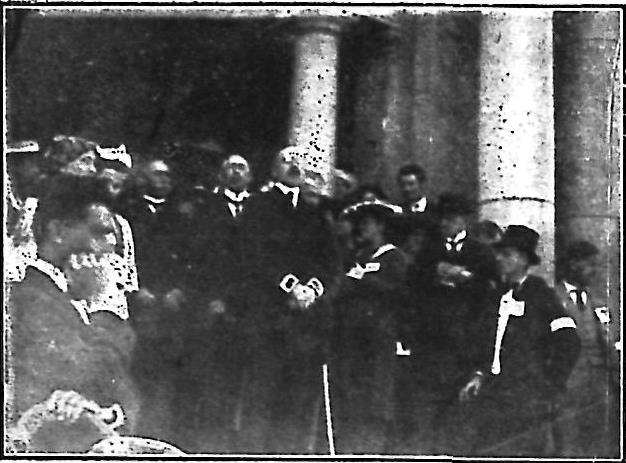
- Ivan Paleček speaking in Zagreb in 1919
- Born: 1868; Osijek, Croatia-Slavonia, Austria-Hungary (now Croatia)
- Died: 1945 (aged 76–77); Belgrade, Federal People's Republic of Yugoslavia (now Serbia)
- Education: University of Vienna
- Occupations: Politician, lawyer
- Political party: Croat-Serb Coalition; Democratic Party (1919–1924); Independent Democratic Party (from 1924)

Ivan Paleček (1868 in Osijek – 1945 in Belgrade) was a Croatian and Yugoslavian politician and lawyer.

== Political career until 1918 ==
Ivan Paleček graduated law and received a doctoral degree in law from the University of Vienna in 1890. He ran a law office in Vukovar. In the 1910 Croatian parliamentary election, Paleček was elected to the Sabor of the Kingdom of Croatia-Slavonia as a member of the ruling Croat-Serb Coalition, and in 1911 also to the Diet of Hungary (legislative bodies of elements of Austria-Hungary). In the final days of the World War I, upon the dissolution of Austria-Hungary, Paleček became a member of the National Council of Slovenes, Croats and Serbs, and a member of the council's central committee. The council was intended as an interim representative and ruling body of South Slavs living in the territory of former Austria-Hungary, organised as the State of Slovenes, Croats and Serbs. Unification of the short-lived state and the Kingdom of Serbia was completed by the end of 1918, thereby establishing the Kingdom of Serbs, Croats and Slovenes (later renamed Yugoslavia).

== Ban of Croatia ==
In early 1919, the leader of the Croat-Serb Coalition Svetozar Pribićević, acting in the capacity of the newly appointed Interior Minister of the Kingdom of Serbs, Croats and Slovenes, proposed to the Prince Regent Alexander to appoint his protege, Paleček the Ban of Croatia (the office largely corresponding to that of the prime minister of the Habsburg Kingdom of Croatia and later Croatia-Slavonia). On 7 January 1919, the Prince Regent appointed Paleček the Ban by means of an Ordinance even though the appointment was not within the legal competence of the Prince Regent. It was contrary to an agreement between the National Council and the government of Serbia made before the unification as the agreement stipulated that the Ban would be elected by the Sabor. Nonetheless, Paleček took the oath of office before Prime Minister Stojan Protić and Pribičević. Pribićević's motivation for the appointment by the ordinance was his wish to devalue existing Croat institutions. Immediately after taking the office, Paleček declared that as the Ban, he would act following Protić's orders, arguing that the Ban's office was no longer autonomous after the Kingdom of Serbs, Croats and Slovenes was established. The Paleček's declaration and the method of his appointment generated anti-government resentment among the Croatian public. Paleček was removed from office in November 1919, replaced by Tomislav Tomljenović, another Democratic Party appointee.

== Political career in the 1920s ==
In early 1920s, Paleček led the Democratic Party organisation in Vukovar. Paleček won a seat in the 1925 Kingdom of Serbs, Croats and Slovenes parliamentary election. He ran as a candidate of the Independent Democratic Party — the Pribićević-led faction of the Democratic Party that became an independent party in 1924. Paleček was elected the vice president of the National Assembly. In May 1925, Paleček came in conflict with parliamentarians of the Slovene People's Party (SLS) when he complained that the party's parliamentary club had its name written at the entrance to the club premises in Latin script only. Paleček had the nameplate taken down and replaced with one in both Latin and Cyrillic scripts, in the process substituting the club's Slovene language name Jugoslovanski klub (meaning "Yugoslav Club"; named after the club formed following the May Declaration of 1917) with Serbian language name Jugoslovenski klub. This angered the SLS president Anton Korošec and he took the new nameplate down. Paleček then had a new Cyrillic-only sign with the club's name installed and a gendarme posted to guard the sign.

== Sources ==
- Banac, Ivo (1984). The National Question in Yugoslavia: Origins, History, Politics. Ithaca, New York: Cornell University Press. ISBN 0-8014-1675-2.
- Barišić, Lidija (2010). "Vukovarski tjednik »Trnje« (1920.)" [Trnje Weekly Magazine (1920)]. Studia lexicographica (in Croatian). 4 (1). Zagreb: Miroslav Krleža Institute of Lexicography: 61–90. ISSN 1846-6745.
- Boban, Ljubo (1993). "Kada je i kako nastala Država Slovenaca, Hrvata i Srba" [When and How Did the State of Slovenes, Croats, And Serbs Come into Existence]. Journal of the Institute of Croatian History (in Croatian). 26 (1). Zagreb: Croatian Institute of History: 187–198. ISSN 0353-295X.
- Dizdar, Zdravko (2006). "Osnivanje i djelatnost četničkih udruženja na području grada i kotara Osijek u monarhističkoj Jugoslaviji (1918.-1941.) (Drugi dio)" [Establishment and Activity of Chetnik Associations in the Territory of the City and District of Osijek in the Royal Yugoslavia (1918–1941) (Part Two)]. Scrinia Slavonica (in Croatian). 6 (1). Slavonski Brod: Croatian Institute of History - Slavonia, Syrmia and Baranya History Branch: 342–401. ISSN 1332-4853.
- Matković, Hrvoje (1974). "Odnos Aleksandra Karađorđevića prema političkom djelovanju Matka Laginje" [Position of Aleksandar Karađorđević in Relation to the Political Work of Matko Laginja]. Časopis za suvremenu povijest (in Croatian). 6 (3). Zagreb: Croatian Institute of History: 39–50. ISSN 0590-9597.
- Mesić, Hrvoje (2017). Pamćenje grada i dokument u digitalno doba: baštinska građa Župe sv. Mihaela arkanđela u Osijeku [Cultural Memory of the City and a Document in the Digital Age: Cultural Heritage of the Parish Church of St. Michael the Archangel in Osijek] (PDF) (PhD thesis) (in Croatian). University of Osijek.
- Rahten, Andrej (2002). Slovenska ljudska stranka v beograjski skupščini [Slovene People's Party in the Belgrade Assembly] (in Slovenian). Ljubljana: Založba ZRC. ISBN 9789616358538.
- Šišić, Ferdo (1920). Dokumenti o postanku Kraljevine Srba, Hrvata i Slovenaca 1914–1919. Sabrao ih F. Šišić [Documents on Genesis of the Kingdom of Serbs, Croats and Slovenes 1914–1919; Collected by F. Šišić] (in Croatian). Zagreb: Matica hrvatska. OCLC 504490993.
- Vranješ-Šoljan, Božena (2021). "Tranzicija hrvatske upravne elite u Kraljevini SHS" [Transition of the Croatian administrative elite in Yugoslavia]. Historijski zbornik (in Croatian). 74 (1). Zagreb: Društvo za hrvatsku povjesnicu: 89–104. ISSN 0351-2193.

| Preceded by Antun Mihalović | Ban of Croatia; 1919 | Succeeded by Tomislav Tomljenović |
