= State of Serbs, Croats and Slovenes =

State of Serbs, Croats and Slovenes may refer to:

- State of Slovenes, Croats and Serbs, a short-lived unrecognized state in 1918
- Kingdom of Serbs, Croats and Slovenes, the 1918–1929 name for what was later the Kingdom of Yugoslavia
