= Zagreb Resolution =

Declaration of objective of political unification of South Slavs

- Presented: 3 March 1918
- Location: Zagreb, Croatia-Slavonia
- Author: Ante Pavelić (senior)

The Zagreb Resolution (Serbo-Croatian: Zagrebačka rezolucija) was a political declaration on the need for political unification of the Croats, the Slovenes and the Serbs living in Austria-Hungary. It was adopted by representatives of opposition political parties in the Kingdom of Croatia-Slavonia presided by Ante Pavelić in a meeting held in Zagreb on 2–3 March 1918. The declaration relied on the right of self-determination and called for establishment of an independent democratic state respecting rights of individuals and historically established polities joining the political union. It also called for ensuring cultural and religious equality in such a union. The Zagreb Resolution established a preparatory committee tasked with establishment of the National Council of Slovenes, Croats and Serbs intended to implement the resolution. The National Council was established on 5 October in proceedings described by Pavelić as a continuation of the Zagreb conference that March.

== Background ==
Kingdoms and countries of Austria-Hungary: Cisleithania: 1. Bohemia, 2. Bukovina, 3. Carinthia, 4. Carniola, 5. Dalmatia, 6. Galicia, 7. Küstenland, 8. Lower Austria, 9. Moravia, 10. Salzburg, 11. Silesia, 12. Styria, 13. Tyrol, 14. Upper Austria, 15. Vorarlberg; Transleithania: 16. Hungary proper 17. Croatia-Slavonia; 18. Bosnia and Herzegovina (Austro-Hungarian condominium)

During the First World War, pressure developed in the parts of Austria-Hungary inhabited by South Slavic population – the Croats, the Serbs, the Slovenes, and the Muslim Slavs (Bosniaks) – in support of a trialist reform, or establishment of a common state of South Slavs independent of the empire. The latter was meant to be achieved through realisation of Yugoslavist ideas, and unification with the Kingdom of Serbia. Motivation for the pro-unification pressure was twofold. Slovenian political leaders were dissatisfied with fragmentation of the Slovene Lands within Cisleithania (the Austrian part of the empire). Their Croatian counterparts objected to division of the proposed Triune Kingdom to Croatia-Slavonia and the Kingdom of Dalmatia assigned to the Hungarian-dominated Lands of the Crown of Saint Stephen and Cisleithania respectively. Dissatisfaction with the status of Bosnia and Herzegovina – an Austrian and Hungarian condominium, separate from Croatia-Slavonia – was another grievance.

Serbia considered the war an opportunity for territorial expansion. A committee tasked with determining war aims produced a programme to establish a Yugoslav state by addition of South Slav-inhabited parts of the Habsburg lands – Croatia-Slavonia, Slovene Lands, Vojvodina, Bosnia and Herzegovina, and Dalmatia. In the Niš Declaration, the National Assembly of Serbia announced the struggle to liberate and unify "unliberated brothers". This aim was contravened by the Triple Entente favouring existence of Austria-Hungary as a counterweight to influence of the German Empire.

In 1915, the Yugoslav Committee, an ad-hoc group of intellectuals and politicians from Austria-Hungary claiming to represent interests of South Slavs, learned that the Triple Entente promised the Kingdom of Italy territory (parts of the Slovene Lands, Istria, and Dalmatia) under the Treaty of London in exchange for Italian entry into World War I. Regardless of the treaty, the international support only began to gradually shift away from preservation of Austria-Hungary in 1917. That year, Russia sued for peace following the Russian Revolution while the United States, whose President Woodrow Wilson advocated the principle of self-determination, entered the war. Nonetheless, in the Fourteen Points speech, Wilson only promised autonomy for the peoples of Austria-Hungary. Preservation of the dual monarchy was not abandoned until well into 1918 when the allies became convinced Austria-Hungary could not resist Communist revolution.

In May 1917, the members of the Yugoslav Club chaired by Anton Korošec, the leader of the Slovene People's Party (SLS) and consisting of South Slavic representatives in the Austrian Imperial Council, presented the council the May Declaration. They demanded unification of Habsburg lands inhabited by Croats, Slovenes, and Serbs into a democratic, free, and independent state organised as a Habsburg realm. The demand was made with references to the principles of national self-determination and Croatian state right. The May Declaration was welcomed by the Milinovci and Antun Bauer, the Archbishop of Zagreb at the time. The ruling party in Croatia-Slavonia, the Croat-Serb Coalition (HSK) and its leader Svetozar Pribičević ignored the May Declaration, The Croatian People's Peasant Party leader Stjepan Radić offered only lukewarm support for the declaration before the imperial authorities prohibited further advocation of the declaration on 12 May 1918.

== Zagreb conference ==
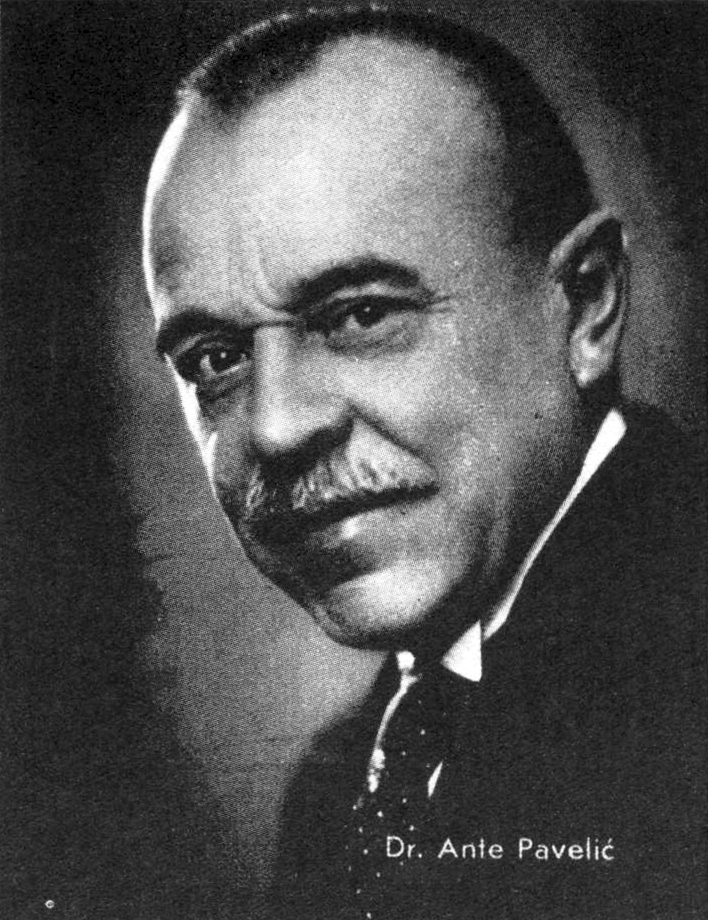
Ante Pavelić chaired the 2–3 March 1918 conference that produced the Zagreb Resolution.

In 1918, the Yugoslav Club launched an initiative to improve collaboration among political parties representing the South Slavs in Austria-Hungary and endorsing the programme of unification of Croats, Slovenes, and Serbs. The initiative was described by the Yugoslav Club as "national concentration" for unification in a common state. However, they did not elaborate on the method or desired outcomes of such unification.

On 2–3 March, a conference was held in Zagreb with the aim of implementing the cooperation proposed by the Yugoslav Club. It was presided by Ante Pavelić, the leader of the Milinovci which assumed the leading role in implementation of the Yugoslav program and the Yugoslav Club's proposal in Croatia-Slavonia. The conference boasted 43 attendees, drawn from the ranks of political opposition. In addition to the Milinovci, the meeting was attended by a group of HSK dissidents, a group of politicians affiliated with the Zagreb-based Catholic daily Novine, members of the Social Democratic Party of Croatia and Slavonia, the SLS, the National Progressive Party, as well as several politicians from Bosnia and Herzegovina, Dalmatia, Istria, and Međimurje. The Croatia-Slavonia's ruling HSK and opposition Croatian People's Peasant Party were invited, but did not attend.

On the second day of the meeting, the Zagreb Resolution was adopted. In its preamble, it was stated that Slovenes, Croats and Serbs are unified and that this unity must remain indivisible and unconditional. The resolution invoked the right to self-determination and called for international guarantees for enjoyment of that right. The first point of the resolution demanded independence, unification and liberty in a unified national state where the specificities of the Slovenes, the Croats and the Serbs would be preserved. The resolution referred to the three as tribes of the "three-named people". The same term was introduced by a group of Belgrade-based scholars led by Jovan Cvijić in December 1914 and was used in the Niš Declaration. The resolution assured continuity of statehood of historically established constituent polities, and equality of the "tribes" and religion.

In its second point, the resolution demanded the "entire territory where [the] unified people live in continuity" without further specification of the claim, except that the territory includes shores, ports and islands of the northern and the eastern Adriatic Sea. The point also offered guarantees of cultural autonomy for minorities. The resolution made no mention of Austria-Hungary as a predetermined framework for establishment of the demanded state or the Habsburgs as its rulers. Finally, the conference appointed a committee tasked with establishing the National Council of Slovenes, Croats and Serbs and scheduled the next conference for 21 April in Zagreb.

The third point of the Zagreb Resolution called for a state unified on the principles of full civil liberties and democratic self-government, legal and social equality ensuring economic prosperity and full cultural and social development of all its citizens. The fourth and final point of the resolution demanded that the Slovenes, Croats and Serbs be guaranteed participation at the future peace conference.

== Aftermath ==
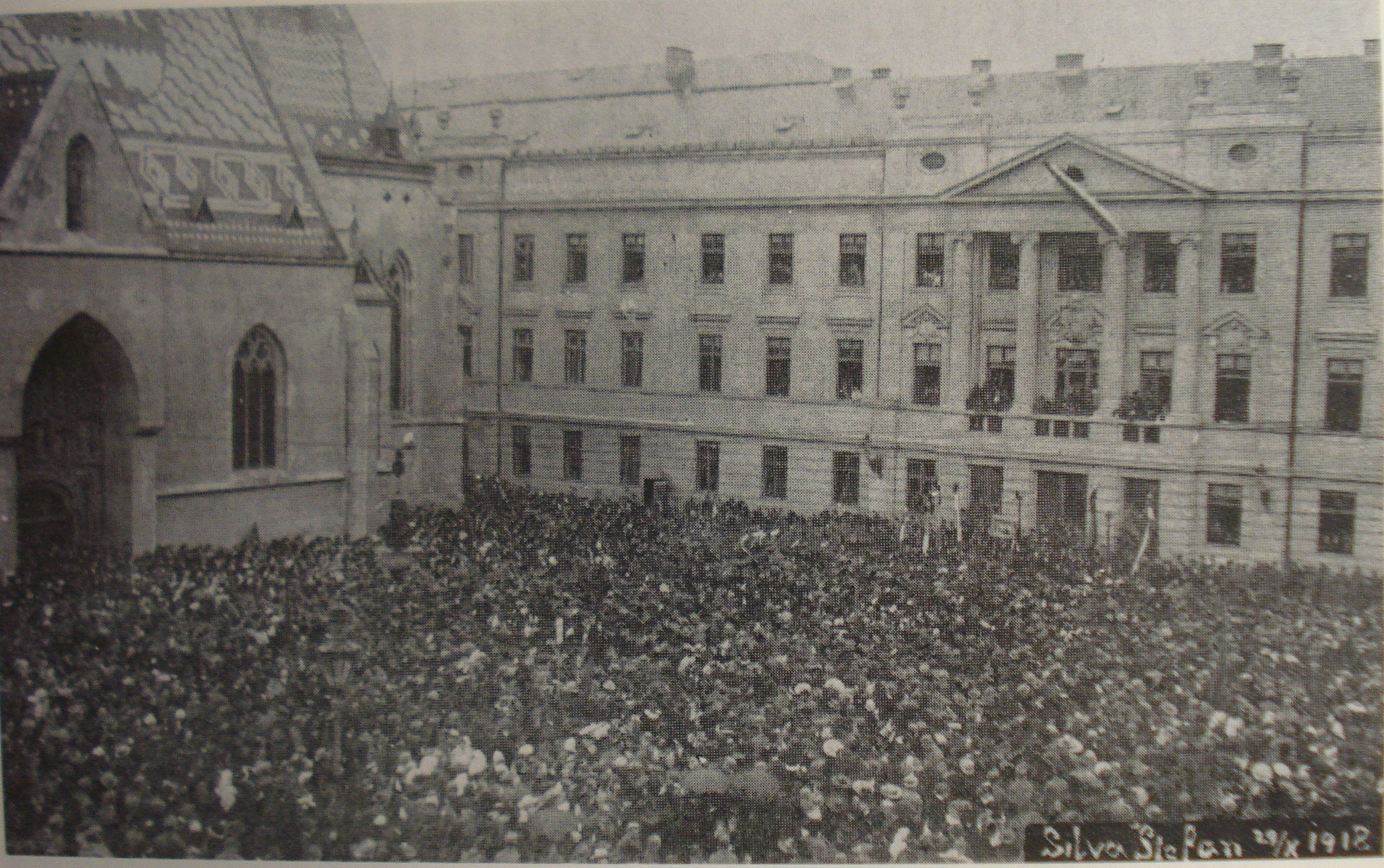
Proclamation of the State of Slovenes, Croats and Serbs in front of the Sabor in Zagreb.

The meeting scheduled for 21 April did not take place. In preparation for establishment of the National Council of Slovenes, Croats and Serbs called for at the 2–3 March Zagreb conference, the National Organisation of Serbs, Croats and Slovenes in Dalmatia was established in Split on 2 June. Next, the National Organisation of Slovenes, Croats and Serbs for the Croatian Littoral was established in Sušak on 14 June. It was followed by establishment of the Slovene National Council (Narodni svet) in Ljubljana on 17 August. The main challenge for the preparatory committee was to obtain cooperation from the HSK, who were convinced that the project was directed against them. The National Council of Slovenes, Croats and Serbs was established in Zagreb on 5 October. The proceedings were chaired by Pavelić, who said that the proceedings represented a continuation of the conference held in Zagreb on 2–3 March. The HSK joined the National Council on 10 October. On 29 October, the Croatian Sabor declared the severance of Croatia-Slavonia's and Dalmatia's legal ties with Austria and Hungary, annulled the 1868 Croatian–Hungarian Settlement and joining the State of Slovenes, Croats and Serbs. The National Council was declared the representative body of the new state, and it elected Korošec its President, and Pribičević and Pavelić vice presidents.

== Sources ==
- Banac, Ivo (1984). The National Question in Yugoslavia: Origins, History, Politics. Ithaca: Cornell University Press. ISBN 0-8014-1675-2.
- Boban, Ljubo (1993). "Kada je i kako nastala Država Slovenaca, Hrvata i Srba" [When and How Did the State of Slovenes, Croats, And Serbs Come into Existence]. Journal of the Institute of Croatian History (in Croatian). 26 (1). Zagreb: Croatian Institute of History: 187–198. ISSN 0353-295X.
- Headlam, James Wycliffe (1911). "Austria-Hungary" . In Chisholm, Hugh (ed.). Encyclopædia Britannica. Vol. 3 (11th ed.). Cambridge University Press. pp. 2–39.
- Koprivica-Oštrić, Stanislava (1993). "Konstituiranje Države Slovenaca, Hrvata i Srba 29. listopada 1918. godine" [Constituting the State of Slovenes, Croats and Serbs on 29 October 1918]. Časopis za suvremenu povijest (in Croatian). 25 (1). Zagreb: Croatian Institute of History: 45–71. ISSN 0590-9597.
- Lampe, John R. (2000). Yugoslavia as History: Twice There Was a Country (2nd ed.). Cambridge: Cambridge University Press. ISBN 0-521-77357-1.
- Matijević, Zlatko (2008a). "The National Council of Slovenes, Croats and Serbs in Zagreb (1918/1919)". Review of Croatian History. 4 (1). Zagreb: Hrvatski institut za povijest: 51–84. ISSN 1845-4380.
- Matijević, Zlatko (2008b). "Narodno vijeće Slovenaca, Hrvata i Srba u Zagrebu: Osnutak, djelovanje i nestanak (1918/1919)" [National Council of Slovenes, Croats and Serbs in Zagreb: Founding, Actions and Disappearance (1918/1919)]. Fontes: Izvori za Hrvatsku Povijest (in Croatian). 14 (1). Zagreb: Croatian State Archives: 35–66. ISSN 1330-6804.
- Pavlowitch, Kosta St. (2003). "The First World War and Unification of Yugoslavia". In Djokic, Dejan (ed.). Yugoslavism: Histories of a Failed Idea, 1918–1992. London: C. Hurst & Co. pp. 27–41. ISBN 1-85065-663-0.
- Ramet, Sabrina P. (2006). The Three Yugoslavias: State-building and Legitimation, 1918–2005. Bloomington: Indiana University Press. ISBN 9780253346568.
