= Ante Pavelić (1869–1938) =

Croatian dentist and politician

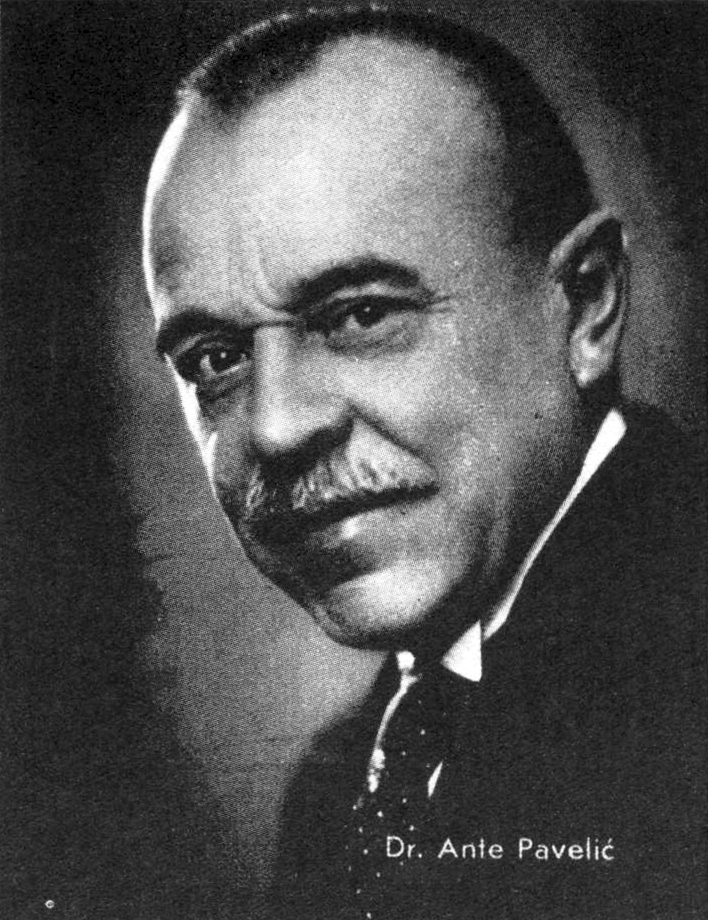

Vice President of the National Council of the State of Slovenes, Croats and Serbs
- In office 29 October 1918 – 1 December 1918 Serving with Svetozar Pribićević
- President: Anton Korošec
- Preceded by: Office established
- Succeeded by: Office abolished

President of the Starčević Party of Rights
- In office 10 March 1917 – 1 March 1919
- Preceded by: Mile Starčević
- Succeeded by: Office abolished

Personal details
- Born: 19 May 1869 Gospić, Kingdom of Croatia-Slavonia, Austria-Hungary
- Died: 11 February 1938 (aged 68) Zagreb, Kingdom of Yugoslavia
- Resting place: Mirogoj, Zagreb, Croatia
- Party: Democratic Party
- Other political affiliations: Party of Rights Starčević Party of Rights Croatian Party of Rights
- Education: University of Vienna
- Occupation: Politician
- Profession: Dentist

Ante Pavelić (pronounced [ǎːnte pǎʋelit͡ɕ]; 19 May 1869 – 11 February 1938) was a Croatian and Yugoslav dentist and politician.

== Biography ==
In Croatian sources, he is usually referred as stariji (Senior) or zubar (the Dentist) to be distinguished from the better known Independent State of Croatia fascist leader and politician Ante Pavelić, who was twenty years younger and member of a different Party of Rights.

Starting in 1906 he was a member of the Croatian Parliament. The Party of Rights that Pavelić belonged to was known as the Milinovci, after their leader Mile Starčević.

On 2–3 March 1918, Pavelić chaired a conference that produced the Zagreb Resolution. On 5 October 1918, he also presided over the initial session of the National Assembly of the State of Slovenes, Croats and Serbs. On 19 October, he became the vice president of the National Assembly. Pavelić authored the Croatian Parliament's declaration of 29 October 1918, that formally acknowledged the National Assembly as the superior authority over Croatia.

Pavelić and others started negotiating with the Serbian envoy to the National Assembly Dušan T. Simović as soon as Hungary signed a truce with the Allies on 13 October 1918. Simović had said that their military victory and the treaty with Hungary gave them right to most of the territory of the State of Slovenes, Croats, and Serbs, whereas Pavelić said that they want unification with Serbia, but that they needed a federal state as well as a delineation of Croatian and Serbian population that would assume a population transfer. Simović rejected the talk of federalization and Pavelić yielded, and there was no further discussion on either issue.

As a delegate of the Assembly, he read the statement on uniting the State of Slovenes, Croats, and Serbs with the Kingdom of Serbia into the Kingdom of Serbs, Croats, and Slovenes on 1 December 1918.

Later, Pavelić joined the Democratic Party, and in 1932 he became the Speaker of the Senate of the Kingdom of Yugoslavia.
