= State of Slovenes, Croats and Serbs =

1918 unrecognised state in Southeast Europe

Coordinates: 45°48′N 15°58′E

State of Slovenes, Croats and Serbs: Država Slovencev, Hrvatov in Srbov (Slovene); Država Slovenaca, Hrvata i Srba (Croatian); Држава Словенаца, Хрвата и Срба (Serbian)
- 1918
- Flag

- The State of Slovenes, Croats and Serbs in 1918. Istria was a disputed area, officially ceded to Italy by the Treaty of Rapallo. Southern Carinthia and Lower Styria were also disputed areas, with the Treaty of Saint-Germain demarcating the border of the newly-created Kingdom of Serbs, Croats and Slovenes with Austria.
- Status: Unrecognised provisional government seeking unification with Serbia
- Capital: Zagreb
- Common languages: Serbo-Croatian Slovene
- President of National Council
  - 1918: Anton Korošec
- Vice President
  - 1918: Ante Pavelić Sr.
  - 1918: Svetozar Pribićević
- Legislature: National Council of Slovenes, Croats and Serbs
- Historical era: Interwar period World War 1
  - Proclaimed secession: 29 October 1918
  - Joined Kingdom of Serbs, Croats and Slovenes: 1 December 1918

Population
  - Estimate: 6,000,000
Preceded by	Succeeded by
Austria-Hungary	Kingdom of Serbs, Croats and Slovenes; Kingdom of Italy

The State of Slovenes, Croats and Serbs (Note: Serbo-Croatian: Država Slovenaca, Hrvata i Srba, Држава Словенаца, Хрвата и Срба; Slovene: Država Slovencev, Hrvatov in Srbov) was a political entity that was constituted in October 1918, at the end of World War I, by Slovenes, Croats and Serbs (Prečani) residing in what were the southernmost parts of the Austro-Hungarian Empire. Although internationally unrecognised, this was the first incarnation of a Yugoslav state founded on the Pan-Slavic ideology. Thirty-three days after it was proclaimed, the state joined the Kingdom of Serbia to form the Kingdom of Serbs, Croats and Slovenes.

== Name ==
The state's name derives from the three main South Slavic ethnic groups that inhabited it: the Slovenes, Croats, and Serbs.

The Croats identified in the name were those residing in the preceding kingdoms of Croatia-Slavonia, Bosnia and Herzegovina and Dalmatia (including Boka Kotorska).

The Serbs identified in the name were those residing in Bosnia and Herzegovina, Croatia-Slavonia, Dalmatia (including Boka Kotorska and Montenegrin Littoral), not those residing in the Kingdom of Serbia (which included the territory of the present-day North Macedonia), nor those living in the Kingdom of Montenegro or Vojvodina (including Banat, Bačka, Baranya).

The Slovenes identified in the name were the residents of the Duchy of Carniola, Duchy of Styria, Duchy of Carinthia and Prekmurje.

== Creation ==
=== Background ===
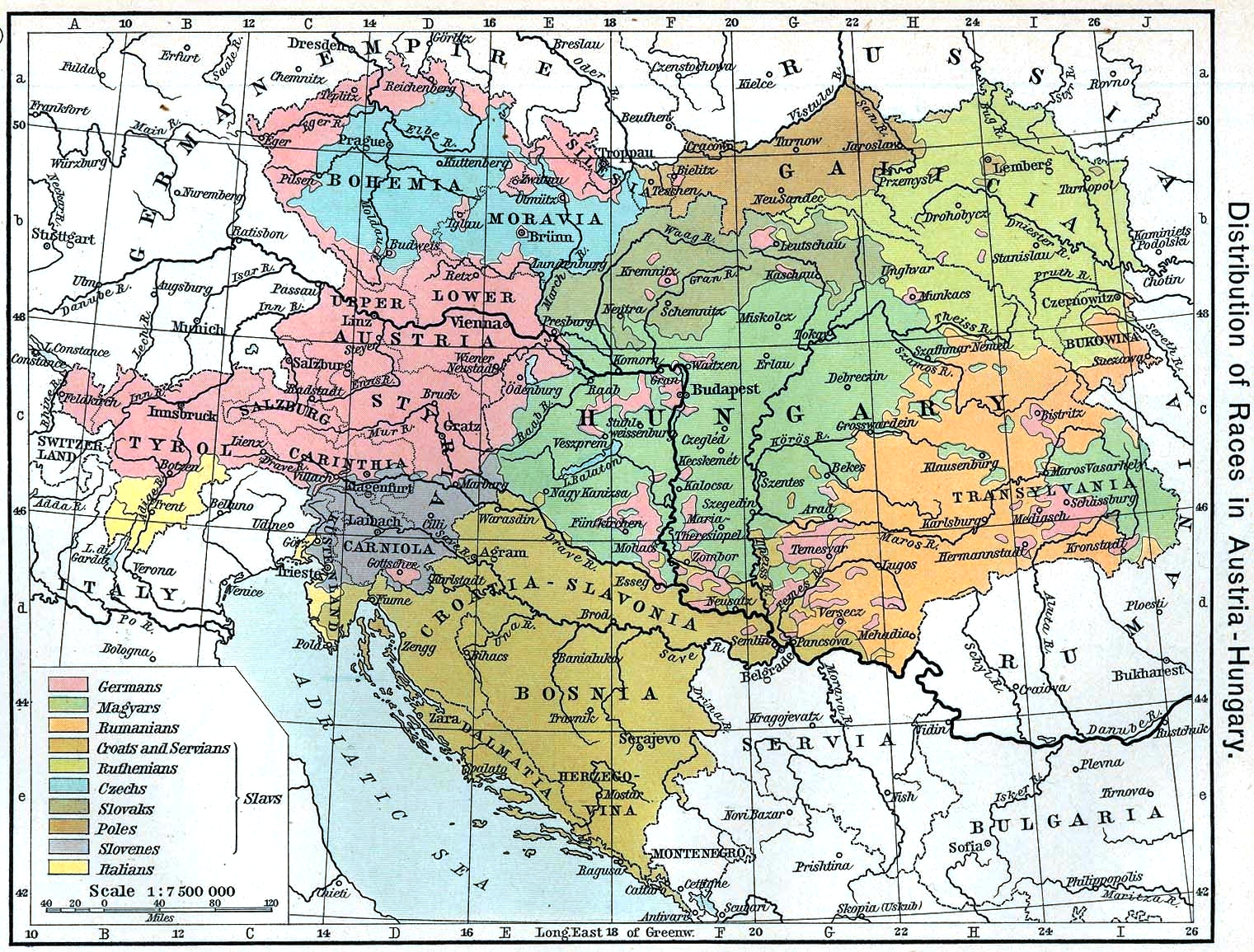
"Distribution of Races in Austria–Hungary" from the Historical Atlas by William R. Shepherd, 1911, indicating those areas inhabited by Slovenes, Croats and Serbs. Most of those territories were included in the State.

In 1918, the final year of the War, the Austro-Hungarian monarchy was suffering from an internal crisis accompanied by unrest amongst the multiple Slavic peoples within its borders. The South Slavic peoples were divided between various subdivisions of the monarchy:

- Cisleithania: The Austrian Littoral, Duchy of Carniola and the Kingdom of Dalmatia were under Austrian jurisdiction. The neighbouring duchies of Styria and the Carinthia also included a significant South Slavic population.
- Transleithania: The Kingdom of Croatia-Slavonia and Fiume (corpus separatum) were under Hungarian jurisdiction. The Kingdom of Hungary itself included a significant South Slavic populations in Prekmurje, Međimurje, Baranja and territories that had been part of the Voivodeship of Serbia and Banat of Temeschwar.
- The Austro-Hungarian Condominium of Bosnia and Herzegovina.

Activities of the pro-Yugoslav forces in the Transleithanian Kingdom of Croatia-Slavonia on 30 May 1917 resulted in adoption of the May Declaration by the Yugoslav Club, a group of Croatian and Slovene deputies in the Reichsrat (the legislature of Cisleithania in Vienna). The Declaration sought the unification of all the lands in the Habsburg monarchy populated by Slovenes, Croats, and Serbs in one independent entity.

On 2–3 March 1918, a grass-roots meeting was held in Zagreb that included representatives of various aspects of public life as well as members of several political parties, primarily the Milinovci led by Ante Pavelić and the Slovene People's Party. The ruling Croat-Serb Coalition and its opposition the Croatian People's Peasant Party, however, were excluded. The meeting produced the Zagreb Resolution that proclaimed the unity of the people of Slovenes, Croats and Serbs (a "unified nation" with the latter described as equal "tribes" whose peculiar historical positions and desires are to be accommodated), demanded a right of self-determination and possession of the territory they occupied, including the whole of Cisleithania.

In July and August 1918, the so-called "People's organizations of Slovenes, Croats and Serbs" were formed in Split (for Dalmatia), Sušak (for the Croatian Littoral) and Ljubljana (for the Slovene lands) to advance these policies. In late August, the Croatia-Slavonia parties met again in Zagreb to discuss how to proceed and, in particular, how to gain the support of the Croat-Serb Coalition.

On 14 September 1918, Austro-Hungarian Foreign Minister Stephan Burián von Rajecz issued a statement advocating a settlement of World War I by peace treaty and it became apparent that the war was coming to an end. By early October, the Slovene-Croat-Serb movement were planning to set up a National Assembly. Svetozar Pribićević, the leader of the Croat-Serb Coalition, confronted Srđan Budisavljević, one of the leaders of this movement, in an effort to determine whether these plans were meant to undermine the Coalition, and the two reached an understanding whereby the Coalition would be invited to join any future National Council before a National Assembly was formed. At the same time, the organizers obtained support from the Croatian People's Peasant Party and the Serb People's Radical Party. On 5 and 6 October, a provisional assembly was convened and the formation of executive committees begun. Seats were apportioned to members of all parties, but not without acrimony over the ad hoc nature of the proceedings.

=== Establishment ===
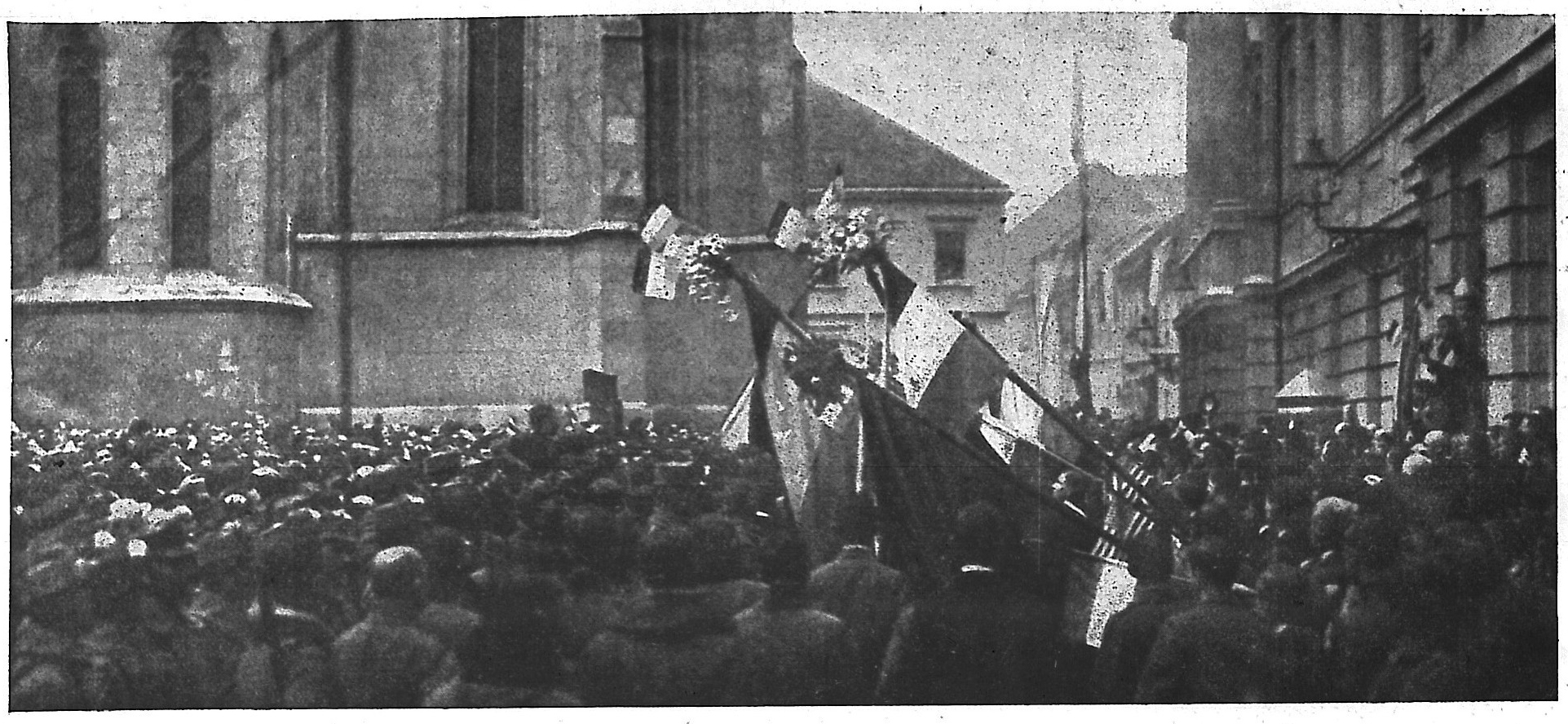
Celebrations of South Slavs in Zagreb during the formation of the National Council of Slovenes, Croats and Serbs, October 1918

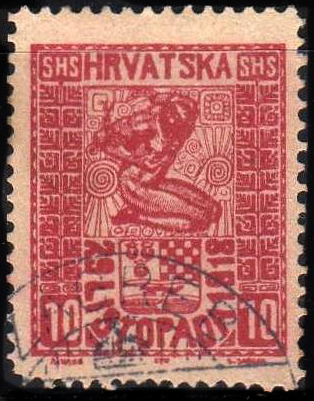
Postage stamp of the State of Slovenes, Croats and Serbs issued in Croatia

The People's Council (Serbo-Croatian: Narodno vijeće, Slovene: Narodni svet) was established on 5–8 October 1918 in Zagreb, pursuant to the decisions reached in March 1918. The Council declared itself a political representative body of Slovenes, Croats and Serbs living in Croatia-Slavonia, Fiume, Dalmatia, Bosnia and Herzegovina, Istria, Trieste, Carniola, Gorizia and Gradisca, Styria, Carinthia, Bačka, Banat, Baranya, Međimurje and elsewhere in southwest Hungary. The Council established its own Central Committee and Presidency, while one member of the Council was to be representative of a 100,000 people. In addition, it comprised five representatives of Croatian Sabor, the Diet of Bosnia and Reichsrat for a total of 95 representatives. 32 voting members were required to form the quorum, and two-thirds majority was needed for any decisions. Members of regional parliaments were allowed to attend as non-voting observers. The Council elected up to 30 Central Committee members, who could appoint a further 10 to the committee by a two-thirds vote.

The Kingdom of Hungary signed a truce with the Allies on 13 October 1918. Pavelić and others started negotiating with the Serbian envoy to the National Assembly Dušan T. Simović as soon as Simović had said that their military victory and the treaty with Hungary gave them right to most of the territory of the State of Slovenes, Croats and Serbs, whereas Pavelić said that they want unification with Serbia, but that they needed a federal state as well as a delineation of Croatian and Serbian population that would assume a population transfer. Simović rejected the talk of federalization and Pavelić yielded, and there was no further discussion on either issue.

On 14 October 1918, Austrian foreign minister Burián asked for an armistice based on the Fourteen Points outlined in January 1918 by American president Woodrow Wilson, whose Point 10 read: "The people of Austria-Hungary, whose place among the nations we wish to see safeguarded and assured, should be accorded the freest opportunity to autonomous development." Two days later, Emperor Karl issued a proclamation ("Imperial Manifesto of 16 October 1918"), which envisaged a significant modification the structure of the Empire by granting wide autonomy to its peoples, including federalization of Cisleithania. Karl's proposal was rejected on 18 October by U.S. Secretary of State Robert Lansing who said autonomy for the nationalities was no longer enough. On 19 October, the National Council of Slovenes, Croats and Serbs declared itself the supreme representative body of all South-Slavic peoples in the monarchy.

On 21 and 22 October, members of the Pure Party of Rights who still advocated a trialist monarchy secured formal support for a trialist manifesto from Emperor Karl and Prime Minister Sándor Wekerle in Hungary, but the latter was deposed the next day.

Numerous mass rallies were held in Zagreb in support the Yugoslav cause, especially on 22 October.

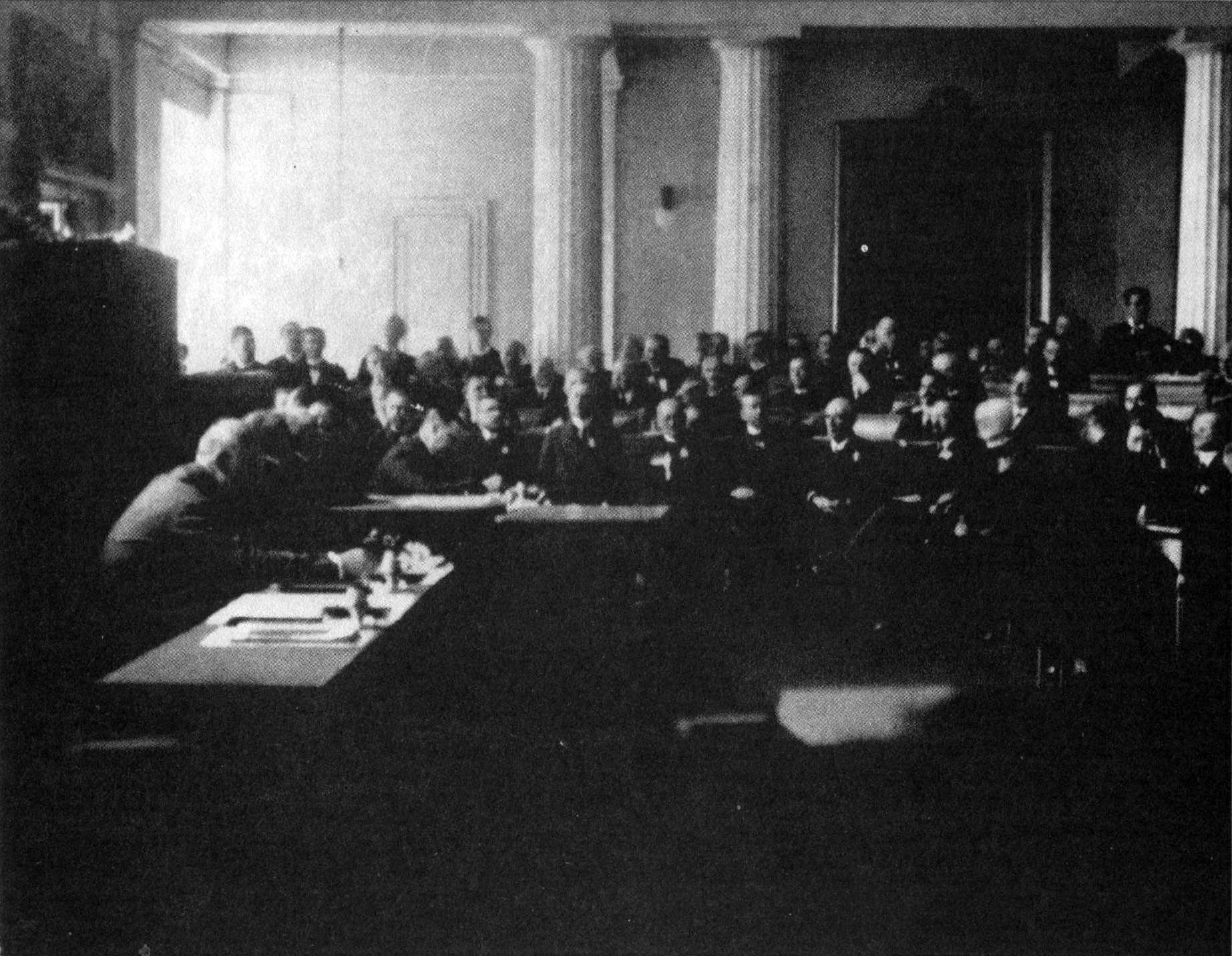
Session of the Croatian parliament, the Sabor, on 29 October 1918

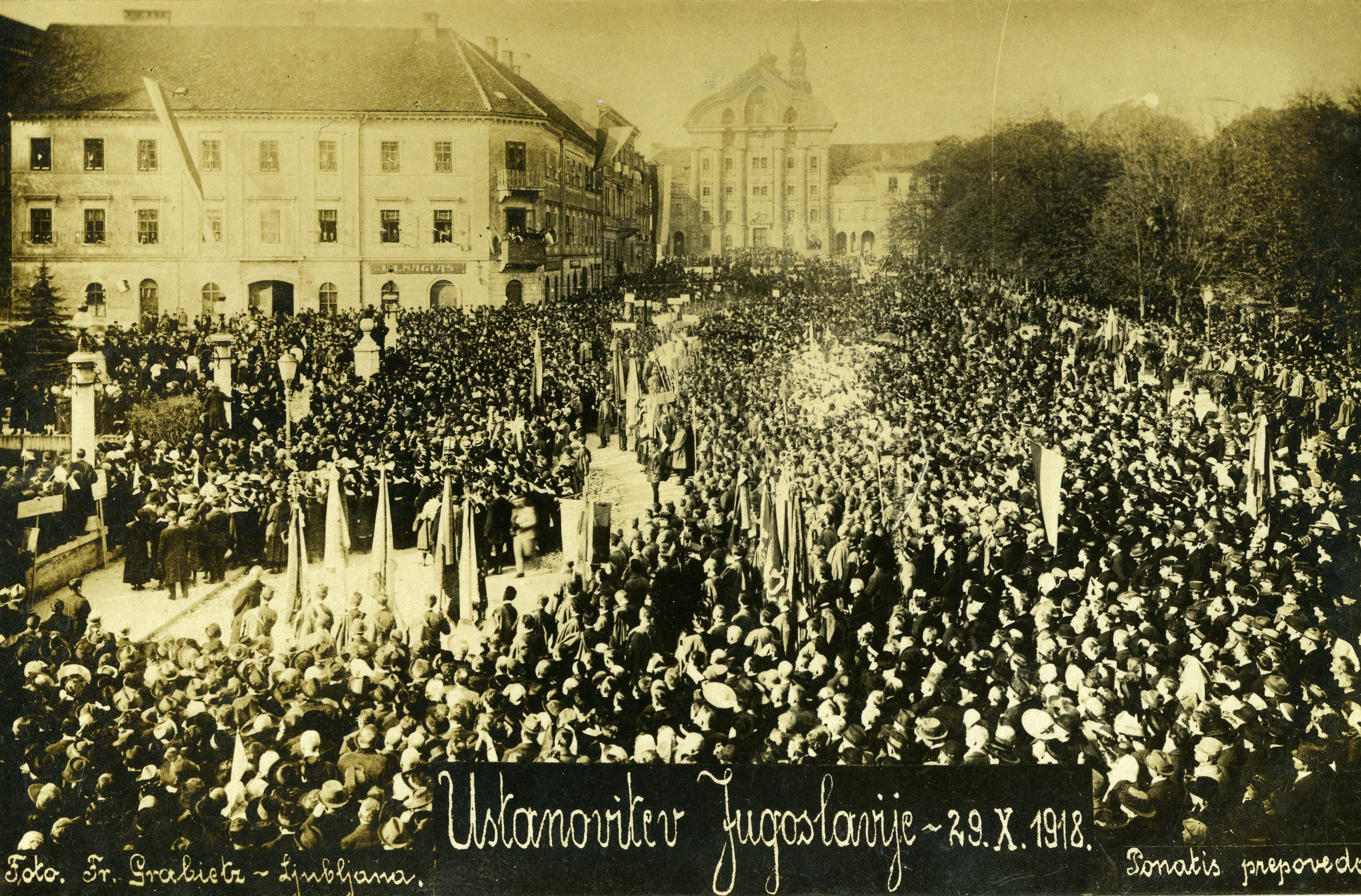
Proclamation of the State of Slovenes, Croats and Serbs in Congress Square, Ljubljana, 29 October 1918

On 28 October, Gyula Andrássy the Younger sent a peace note to the American government while the Ban of Croatia, Antun Mihalović, reported to the Emperor and was dismissed with the instruction "Do as you please". The Ministry of War had also decided to allow the local military commands to approach the people's councils in order to help maintain law and order. All this was taken as a sign that the Austro-Hungarian monarchy was disintegrating and that the State of Slovenes, Croats and Serbs was an attainable goal.

The state was proclaimed officially on 29 October 1918. Its first president was a Slovene, Anton Korošec. The two vice presidents were a Serb, Svetozar Pribićević, and a Croat, Ante Pavelić.

The new state aspired to include all those territories of the former Austria-Hungary that were inhabited by Slovenes, Croats and Serbs. Those representing the Serbs in Vojvodina, however – including those in Banat, Bačka and Baranja – objected and formed their own administration under the supreme authority of the Serbian National Board in Novi Sad. Vojvodina then joined the Kingdom of Serbia on 25 November 1918. One day earlier, on 24 November 1918, the region of Syrmia, which had become part of the State of Slovenes, Croats and Serbs, seceded and also joined the Kingdom of Serbia.

== Conflict with Hungary ==
Military units loyal to the State engaged the Hungarian garrison in Međimurje in November 1918.

== Conflict with Italy ==
In order to avoid handing them to the Entente Powers, Emperor Karl assigned the entire Austro-Hungarian Navy, the Austro-Hungarian merchant fleet and all Austro-Hungarian harbours, arsenals and shore fortifications to the National Council. The National Council sent diplomatic notes to the Entente governments notifying them that they had taken control of these assets and were not at war. The fleet, however, was soon attacked and dismembered by the Italian navy, the Regia Marina.

Austria-Hungary reached an armistice with Italy through the Armistice of Villa Giusti signed on 4 November 1918. This agreement stipulated that Italy could occupy large parts of the territory that had been included in the State of Slovenes, Croats and Serbs. Italian troops then occupied Istria and much of Dalmatia within the occupation of the eastern Adriatic and remained there until 1921, when the Treaty of Rapallo came into effect.

== Creation of the Kingdom of Serbs, Croats, and Slovenes ==
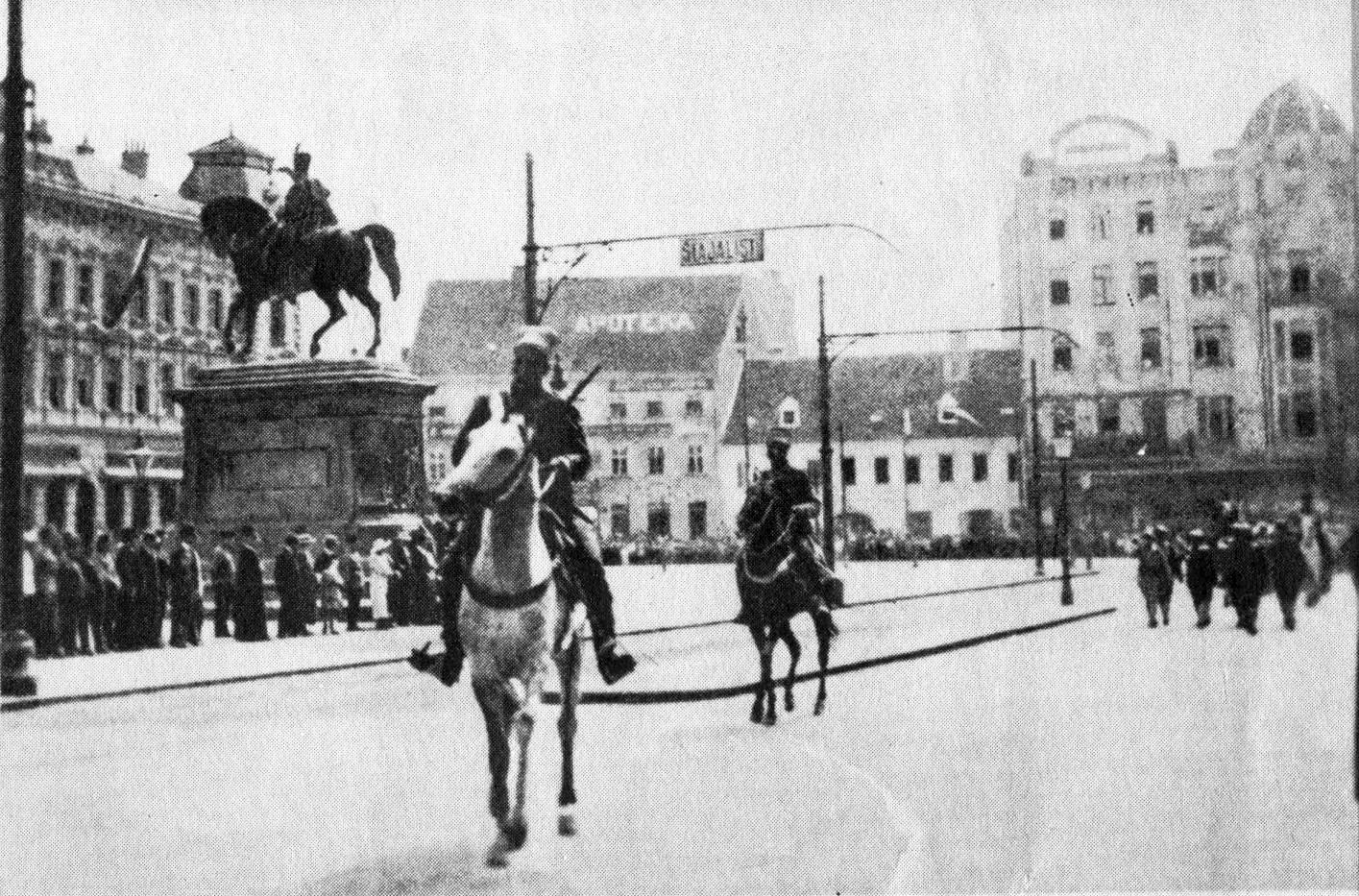
Delegation of the Serbian Army in a joint parade in Zagreb's Ban Jelačić Square in 1918

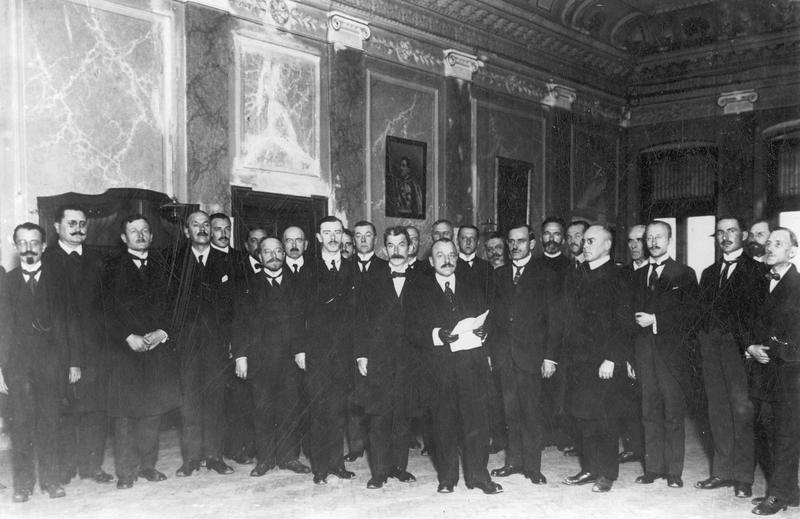
Delegation of the National Council of the State of Slovenes, Croats and Serbs led by Ante Pavelić reading the address in front of regent Alexander, 1 December 1918

The State of Slovenes, Croats and Serbs did not obtain international diplomatic recognition before it ceased to exist. In a note of 31 October, the National Council informed the governments of the United Kingdom, France, Italy and the United States that the State of Slovenes, Croats and Serbs was constituted in the South-Slavic areas that had been part of Austria-Hungary, and that the new state intended to form a common state with Serbia and Montenegro. The same note was sent to the government of the Kingdom of Serbia and the Yugoslav Committee in London. Serbia's prime minister Nikola Pašić responded to the note on 8 November, recognizing the National Council in Zagreb as "legal government of Serbs, Croats and Slovenes living in the territory of the Austria-Hungary", and notified the governments of the United Kingdom, France, Italy and the United States asking them to do the same.

On 23–24 November, the National Council declared "unification of the State of Slovenes, Croats and Serbs formed on the entire, contiguous South-Slavic area of the former Austria-Hungary with the Kingdom of Serbia and Montenegro into a unified State of Slovenes, Croats and Serbs". 28 members of the council were appointed to implement that decision based on National Council's adopted directions on implementation of the agreement of organization of the unified state with the government of the Kingdom of Serbia and representatives of political parties in Serbia and Montenegro. The instructions were largely ignored by the delegation members who negotiated with Regent Alexander instead.

Stjepan Radić's Peasant Party participated in the National Council, but after it decided to merge with Serbia, they started to back off, calling the move foolish, and disputing the decision based on the fact that the Croatian Parliament never explicitly approved it.

On 1 December, Regent Alexander proclaimed unification of "Serbia with lands of the independent State of Slovenes, Croats and Serbs into a unified Kingdom of Serbs, Croats, and Slovenes". As the National Council ceased to operate, it never formally ratified the proclamation, nor did the Parliament of Serbia, which took note of the declaration on 29 December 1918.

The National Council's final important task was to appoint representatives to the Temporary National Representation in early 1919.

== See also ==
- Geneva Declaration (1918)
- Lipošćak affair
- Podgorica Assembly
- History of Yugoslavia
- Verigar issue
- Slovene March
- Timeline of Croatian history

== Sources ==
- Matijević, Zlatko (November 2008). "Narodno vijeće Slovenaca, Hrvata i Srba u Zagrebu: Osnutak, djelovanje i nestanak (1918/1919)" (PDF). Fontes (in Croatian). 14 (14). Croatian State Archives: 35–66. ISSN 1330-6804.
- Štambuk-Škalić, Marina; Matijević, Zlatko, eds. (November 2008). "Narodno vijeće Slovenaca, Hrvata i Srba u Zagrebu 1918–1919. Izabrani dokumenti". Fontes (in Croatian). 14 (1). Croatian State Archives: 71–596.
- Boban, Ljubo (October 1993). "Kada je i kako nastala Država Slovenaca, Hrvata i Srba" [When and how was the State of Slovenes, Croats and Serbs formed]. Radovi – Journal – Institute of Croatian History (in Croatian). 26 (1). Institute of Croatian History, Faculty of Philosophy, Zagreb: 187–198. ISSN 0353-295X.

Region	until 1918	1918– 1929	1929– 1945	1941– 1945	1945– 1946	1946– 1963	1963– 1992	1992– 2003	2003– 2006	2006– 2008	since 2008
Slovenia	Part of Austria-Hungary including the Bay of Kotor See also: Kingdom of Croatia-Slavonia (1868–1918) Kingdom of Dalmatia (1815–1918) Condominium of Bosnia and Herzegovina (1878–1918)	State of Slovenes, Croats and Serbs (1918) Kingdom of Serbs, Croats and Slovenes (1918–1929) Kingdom of Yugoslavia (1929–1943) See also: Republic of Prekmurje (1919) Banat, Bačka and Baranja (1918–1919) Free State of Fiume (1920–1924) (1924–1945) Italian province of Zadar (1920–1947)		Annexed by Italy, Germany, and Hungary^{a}	Democratic Federal Yugoslavia (1943–1945) Federal People's Republic of Yugoslavia (1945–1963) Socialist Federal Republic of Yugoslavia (1963–1992) Consisted of the Socialist Republics of: Slovenia (1945–1991); Croatia (1945–1991); Bosnia and Herzegovina (1945–1992) Serbia (1945–1992) (included the autonomous provinces of Vojvodina and Kosovo) Montenegro (1945–1992); Macedonia (1945–1991) See also: Free Territory of Trieste (1947–1954)^{h}			Republic of Slovenia; Ten-Day War			
Dalmatia	Part of Austria-Hungary including the Bay of Kotor See also: Kingdom of Croatia-Slavonia (1868–1918) Kingdom of Dalmatia (1815–1918) Condominium of Bosnia and Herzegovina (1878–1918)	State of Slovenes, Croats and Serbs (1918) Kingdom of Serbs, Croats and Slovenes (1918–1929) Kingdom of Yugoslavia (1929–1943) See also: Republic of Prekmurje (1919) Banat, Bačka and Baranja (1918–1919) Free State of Fiume (1920–1924) (1924–1945) Italian province of Zadar (1920–1947)		Independent State of Croatia (1941–1945) Puppet state of Germany. Parts annexed by Italy. Međimurje and Baranja annexed by Hungary.	Democratic Federal Yugoslavia (1943–1945) Federal People's Republic of Yugoslavia (1945–1963) Socialist Federal Republic of Yugoslavia (1963–1992) Consisted of the Socialist Republics of: Slovenia (1945–1991); Croatia (1945–1991); Bosnia and Herzegovina (1945–1992) Serbia (1945–1992) (included the autonomous provinces of Vojvodina and Kosovo) Montenegro (1945–1992); Macedonia (1945–1991) See also: Free Territory of Trieste (1947–1954)^{h}			Republic of Croatia^{b} Croatian War of Independence			
Slavonia	Part of Austria-Hungary including the Bay of Kotor See also: Kingdom of Croatia-Slavonia (1868–1918) Kingdom of Dalmatia (1815–1918) Condominium of Bosnia and Herzegovina (1878–1918)	State of Slovenes, Croats and Serbs (1918) Kingdom of Serbs, Croats and Slovenes (1918–1929) Kingdom of Yugoslavia (1929–1943) See also: Republic of Prekmurje (1919) Banat, Bačka and Baranja (1918–1919) Free State of Fiume (1920–1924) (1924–1945) Italian province of Zadar (1920–1947)		Independent State of Croatia (1941–1945) Puppet state of Germany. Parts annexed by Italy. Međimurje and Baranja annexed by Hungary.	Democratic Federal Yugoslavia (1943–1945) Federal People's Republic of Yugoslavia (1945–1963) Socialist Federal Republic of Yugoslavia (1963–1992) Consisted of the Socialist Republics of: Slovenia (1945–1991); Croatia (1945–1991); Bosnia and Herzegovina (1945–1992) Serbia (1945–1992) (included the autonomous provinces of Vojvodina and Kosovo) Montenegro (1945–1992); Macedonia (1945–1991) See also: Free Territory of Trieste (1947–1954)^{h}			Republic of Croatia^{b} Croatian War of Independence			
Croatia	Part of Austria-Hungary including the Bay of Kotor See also: Kingdom of Croatia-Slavonia (1868–1918) Kingdom of Dalmatia (1815–1918) Condominium of Bosnia and Herzegovina (1878–1918)	State of Slovenes, Croats and Serbs (1918) Kingdom of Serbs, Croats and Slovenes (1918–1929) Kingdom of Yugoslavia (1929–1943) See also: Republic of Prekmurje (1919) Banat, Bačka and Baranja (1918–1919) Free State of Fiume (1920–1924) (1924–1945) Italian province of Zadar (1920–1947)		Independent State of Croatia (1941–1945) Puppet state of Germany. Parts annexed by Italy. Međimurje and Baranja annexed by Hungary.	Democratic Federal Yugoslavia (1943–1945) Federal People's Republic of Yugoslavia (1945–1963) Socialist Federal Republic of Yugoslavia (1963–1992) Consisted of the Socialist Republics of: Slovenia (1945–1991); Croatia (1945–1991); Bosnia and Herzegovina (1945–1992) Serbia (1945–1992) (included the autonomous provinces of Vojvodina and Kosovo) Montenegro (1945–1992); Macedonia (1945–1991) See also: Free Territory of Trieste (1947–1954)^{h}			Republic of Croatia^{b} Croatian War of Independence			
Bosnia	Part of Austria-Hungary including the Bay of Kotor See also: Kingdom of Croatia-Slavonia (1868–1918) Kingdom of Dalmatia (1815–1918) Condominium of Bosnia and Herzegovina (1878–1918)	State of Slovenes, Croats and Serbs (1918) Kingdom of Serbs, Croats and Slovenes (1918–1929) Kingdom of Yugoslavia (1929–1943) See also: Republic of Prekmurje (1919) Banat, Bačka and Baranja (1918–1919) Free State of Fiume (1920–1924) (1924–1945) Italian province of Zadar (1920–1947)		Independent State of Croatia (1941–1945) Puppet state of Germany. Parts annexed by Italy. Međimurje and Baranja annexed by Hungary.	Democratic Federal Yugoslavia (1943–1945) Federal People's Republic of Yugoslavia (1945–1963) Socialist Federal Republic of Yugoslavia (1963–1992) Consisted of the Socialist Republics of: Slovenia (1945–1991); Croatia (1945–1991); Bosnia and Herzegovina (1945–1992) Serbia (1945–1992) (included the autonomous provinces of Vojvodina and Kosovo) Montenegro (1945–1992); Macedonia (1945–1991) See also: Free Territory of Trieste (1947–1954)^{h}			Bosnia and Herzegovina^{c} Bosnian War Consists of the Federation of Bosnia and Herzegovina (since 1995), Republika Srpska (since 1995), and Brčko District (since 2000).			
Herzegovina	Part of Austria-Hungary including the Bay of Kotor See also: Kingdom of Croatia-Slavonia (1868–1918) Kingdom of Dalmatia (1815–1918) Condominium of Bosnia and Herzegovina (1878–1918)	State of Slovenes, Croats and Serbs (1918) Kingdom of Serbs, Croats and Slovenes (1918–1929) Kingdom of Yugoslavia (1929–1943) See also: Republic of Prekmurje (1919) Banat, Bačka and Baranja (1918–1919) Free State of Fiume (1920–1924) (1924–1945) Italian province of Zadar (1920–1947)		Independent State of Croatia (1941–1945) Puppet state of Germany. Parts annexed by Italy. Međimurje and Baranja annexed by Hungary.	Democratic Federal Yugoslavia (1943–1945) Federal People's Republic of Yugoslavia (1945–1963) Socialist Federal Republic of Yugoslavia (1963–1992) Consisted of the Socialist Republics of: Slovenia (1945–1991); Croatia (1945–1991); Bosnia and Herzegovina (1945–1992) Serbia (1945–1992) (included the autonomous provinces of Vojvodina and Kosovo) Montenegro (1945–1992); Macedonia (1945–1991) See also: Free Territory of Trieste (1947–1954)^{h}			Bosnia and Herzegovina^{c} Bosnian War Consists of the Federation of Bosnia and Herzegovina (since 1995), Republika Srpska (since 1995), and Brčko District (since 2000).			
Vojvodina	Part of the Délvidék region of Hungary	State of Slovenes, Croats and Serbs (1918) Kingdom of Serbs, Croats and Slovenes (1918–1929) Kingdom of Yugoslavia (1929–1943) See also: Republic of Prekmurje (1919) Banat, Bačka and Baranja (1918–1919) Free State of Fiume (1920–1924) (1924–1945) Italian province of Zadar (1920–1947)		Autonomous Banat^{d} (part of the German; Territory of the Military Commander in Serbia)	Democratic Federal Yugoslavia (1943–1945) Federal People's Republic of Yugoslavia (1945–1963) Socialist Federal Republic of Yugoslavia (1963–1992) Consisted of the Socialist Republics of: Slovenia (1945–1991); Croatia (1945–1991); Bosnia and Herzegovina (1945–1992) Serbia (1945–1992) (included the autonomous provinces of Vojvodina and Kosovo) Montenegro (1945–1992); Macedonia (1945–1991) See also: Free Territory of Trieste (1947–1954)^{h}			Federal Republic of Yugoslavia Consisted of the Republic of Serbia (1992–2006) and Republic of Montenegro (1992–2006) Included Kosovo and Metohija, under UN administration, without control since 1999	State Union of Serbia and Montenegro Included Kosovo, under UN administration	Republic of Serbia Included the autonomous provinces of Vojvodina and Kosovo and Metohija under UN administration	Republic of Serbia Includes the autonomous province of Vojvodina; Kosovo claim
Central Serbia	Kingdom of Serbia (1882–1918)	State of Slovenes, Croats and Serbs (1918) Kingdom of Serbs, Croats and Slovenes (1918–1929) Kingdom of Yugoslavia (1929–1943) See also: Republic of Prekmurje (1919) Banat, Bačka and Baranja (1918–1919) Free State of Fiume (1920–1924) (1924–1945) Italian province of Zadar (1920–1947)		Territory of the Military Commander in Serbia (1941–1944) ^{e}	Democratic Federal Yugoslavia (1943–1945) Federal People's Republic of Yugoslavia (1945–1963) Socialist Federal Republic of Yugoslavia (1963–1992) Consisted of the Socialist Republics of: Slovenia (1945–1991); Croatia (1945–1991); Bosnia and Herzegovina (1945–1992) Serbia (1945–1992) (included the autonomous provinces of Vojvodina and Kosovo) Montenegro (1945–1992); Macedonia (1945–1991) See also: Free Territory of Trieste (1947–1954)^{h}			Federal Republic of Yugoslavia Consisted of the Republic of Serbia (1992–2006) and Republic of Montenegro (1992–2006) Included Kosovo and Metohija, under UN administration, without control since 1999	State Union of Serbia and Montenegro Included Kosovo, under UN administration	Republic of Serbia Included the autonomous provinces of Vojvodina and Kosovo and Metohija under UN administration	Republic of Serbia Includes the autonomous province of Vojvodina; Kosovo claim
Kosovo	Part of the Kingdom of Serbia (1912–1918)	State of Slovenes, Croats and Serbs (1918) Kingdom of Serbs, Croats and Slovenes (1918–1929) Kingdom of Yugoslavia (1929–1943) See also: Republic of Prekmurje (1919) Banat, Bačka and Baranja (1918–1919) Free State of Fiume (1920–1924) (1924–1945) Italian province of Zadar (1920–1947)		Mostly annexed by Italian Albania (1941–1944) along with western Macedonia and south-eastern Montenegro	Democratic Federal Yugoslavia (1943–1945) Federal People's Republic of Yugoslavia (1945–1963) Socialist Federal Republic of Yugoslavia (1963–1992) Consisted of the Socialist Republics of: Slovenia (1945–1991); Croatia (1945–1991); Bosnia and Herzegovina (1945–1992) Serbia (1945–1992) (included the autonomous provinces of Vojvodina and Kosovo) Montenegro (1945–1992); Macedonia (1945–1991) See also: Free Territory of Trieste (1947–1954)^{h}			Federal Republic of Yugoslavia Consisted of the Republic of Serbia (1992–2006) and Republic of Montenegro (1992–2006) Included Kosovo and Metohija, under UN administration, without control since 1999	State Union of Serbia and Montenegro Included Kosovo, under UN administration	Republic of Serbia Included the autonomous provinces of Vojvodina and Kosovo and Metohija under UN administration	Republic of Kosovo
Metohija	Kingdom of Montenegro (1910–1918) Metohija controlled by Austria-Hungary 1915–1918	State of Slovenes, Croats and Serbs (1918) Kingdom of Serbs, Croats and Slovenes (1918–1929) Kingdom of Yugoslavia (1929–1943) See also: Republic of Prekmurje (1919) Banat, Bačka and Baranja (1918–1919) Free State of Fiume (1920–1924) (1924–1945) Italian province of Zadar (1920–1947)		Mostly annexed by Italian Albania (1941–1944) along with western Macedonia and south-eastern Montenegro	Democratic Federal Yugoslavia (1943–1945) Federal People's Republic of Yugoslavia (1945–1963) Socialist Federal Republic of Yugoslavia (1963–1992) Consisted of the Socialist Republics of: Slovenia (1945–1991); Croatia (1945–1991); Bosnia and Herzegovina (1945–1992) Serbia (1945–1992) (included the autonomous provinces of Vojvodina and Kosovo) Montenegro (1945–1992); Macedonia (1945–1991) See also: Free Territory of Trieste (1947–1954)^{h}			Federal Republic of Yugoslavia Consisted of the Republic of Serbia (1992–2006) and Republic of Montenegro (1992–2006) Included Kosovo and Metohija, under UN administration, without control since 1999	State Union of Serbia and Montenegro Included Kosovo, under UN administration	Republic of Serbia Included the autonomous provinces of Vojvodina and Kosovo and Metohija under UN administration	Republic of Kosovo
Montenegro and Brda	Kingdom of Montenegro (1910–1918) Metohija controlled by Austria-Hungary 1915–1918	State of Slovenes, Croats and Serbs (1918) Kingdom of Serbs, Croats and Slovenes (1918–1929) Kingdom of Yugoslavia (1929–1943) See also: Republic of Prekmurje (1919) Banat, Bačka and Baranja (1918–1919) Free State of Fiume (1920–1924) (1924–1945) Italian province of Zadar (1920–1947)		Protectorate of Montenegro^{f} (1941–1944)	Democratic Federal Yugoslavia (1943–1945) Federal People's Republic of Yugoslavia (1945–1963) Socialist Federal Republic of Yugoslavia (1963–1992) Consisted of the Socialist Republics of: Slovenia (1945–1991); Croatia (1945–1991); Bosnia and Herzegovina (1945–1992) Serbia (1945–1992) (included the autonomous provinces of Vojvodina and Kosovo) Montenegro (1945–1992); Macedonia (1945–1991) See also: Free Territory of Trieste (1947–1954)^{h}			Federal Republic of Yugoslavia Consisted of the Republic of Serbia (1992–2006) and Republic of Montenegro (1992–2006) Included Kosovo and Metohija, under UN administration, without control since 1999	State Union of Serbia and Montenegro Included Kosovo, under UN administration	Montenegro	
Vardar Macedonia	Part of the Kingdom of Serbia (1912–1918)	State of Slovenes, Croats and Serbs (1918) Kingdom of Serbs, Croats and Slovenes (1918–1929) Kingdom of Yugoslavia (1929–1943) See also: Republic of Prekmurje (1919) Banat, Bačka and Baranja (1918–1919) Free State of Fiume (1920–1924) (1924–1945) Italian province of Zadar (1920–1947)		Annexed by the Kingdom of Bulgaria (1941–1944)	Democratic Federal Yugoslavia (1943–1945) Federal People's Republic of Yugoslavia (1945–1963) Socialist Federal Republic of Yugoslavia (1963–1992) Consisted of the Socialist Republics of: Slovenia (1945–1991); Croatia (1945–1991); Bosnia and Herzegovina (1945–1992) Serbia (1945–1992) (included the autonomous provinces of Vojvodina and Kosovo) Montenegro (1945–1992); Macedonia (1945–1991) See also: Free Territory of Trieste (1947–1954)^{h}			Republic of North Macedonia^{g}			
^{a} Prekmurje annexed by Hungary.; ^{b} See also: SAO Kninska Krajina (1990) → SAO Krajina (1990–1991); and SAO Eastern Slavonia, Baranja and Western Syrmia (1990–1991), SAO Western Slavonia (1990–1991) and the Republic of Serbian Krajina (1990–1995), all replaced by the UN Transitional Administration for Eastern Slavonia, Baranja and Western Sirmium (1996–1998).; ^{c} See also: Republic of Bosnia and Herzegovina; Croatian Republic of Herzeg-Bosnia; and the Serbian Autonomous Oblasts (SAOs) of Bosanska Krajina, North-East Bosnia, Romanija and Herzegovina (1991–1992), which all combined to form the Serbian Republic of Bosnia and Herzegovina (1992–1995).; ^{d} Bačka was reannexed by Hungary (1941–1944), while Syrmia was annexed by the Independent State of Croatia (1941–1944).; ^{e} Including North Kosovo. See also: Republic of Užice.; ^{f} Annexed by Italy (1941–1943) and Germany (1943–1944). Smaller part annexed by the Independent State of Croatia (1941–1944).; ^{g} North Macedonia's official and constitutional name was the Republic of Macedonia until 2019. It was known in the United Nations as the former Yugoslav Republic of Macedonia because of a naming dispute with Greece.; ^{h} Free Territory was established in 1947. Its administration was divided into two areas (Zone A) and (Zone B). Free Territory was de facto taken over by Italy and SFRY in 1954.
