= Iván Skerlecz =

Ban of Croatia from 1913 to 1917

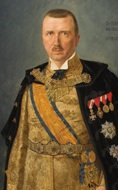
- Iván Skerlecz portraited as Ban

Ban of Croatia-Slavonia
- In office 21 July 1913 – 29 June 1917
- Monarchs: Franz Joseph I of Austria (until 1916); Charles I of Austria
- Preceded by: Slavko Cuvaj
- Succeeded by: Antun Mihalović

Personal details
- Born: 20 July 1873 Oroszló, Austria-Hungary
- Died: 20 January 1951 (aged 77) Budapest, People's Republic of Hungary
- Occupation: Politician

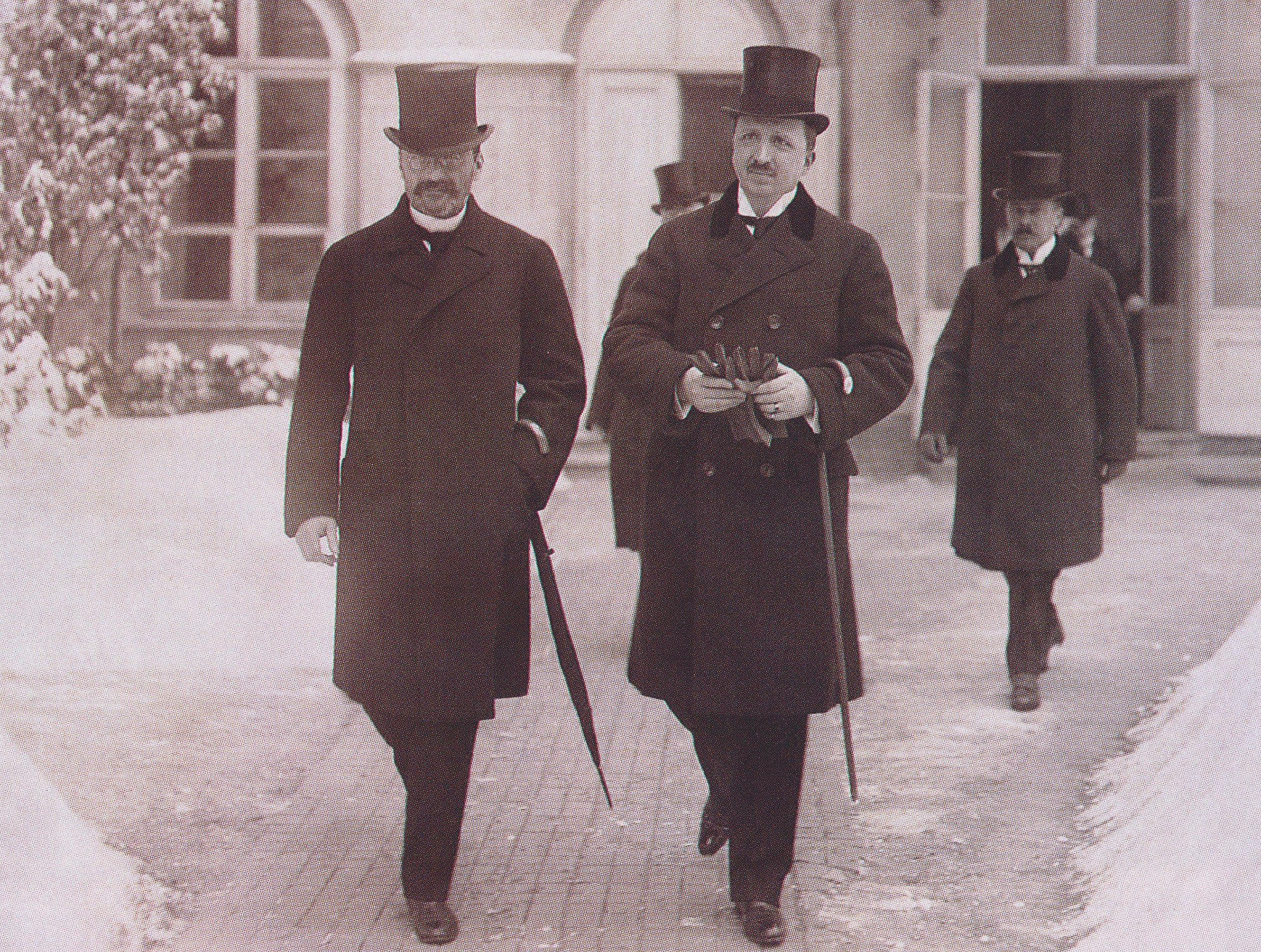
Pm. István Tisza with his friend Ivan Skerlecz in Zagreb in 1914

Baron Iván Skerlecz de Lomnicza (often rendered Ivan Škrlec Lomnički in Croatian; 20 July 1873 – 12 January 1951) was a Croatian ban (viceroy) between 21 July 1913, until 29 June 1917.

Skerlecz was born in Oroszló, Baranya County, Kingdom of Hungary in 1873. He was born into Šokci origin aristocratic family. His father was Baron Károly Skerlecz de Lomnicza (1836–1901), high sheriff (főszolgabíró) of Baranya county, ministerial councilor; his mother was the noble lady Sarolta Hrabovszky de Hrabova (1850–1931). His paternal grandfather was Baron Károly Skerlecz de Lomnicza (1793–1863), royal chamberlain, who received the title of baron on 22 August 1857. His maternal grandparents were Baron János Hrabovszky (1777–1852), a major general and military commander of Croatia and Slavonia, and Izabella Klobusiczky (1824–1905) from Klobusic and Homorog."

The Skerlecz family had good relations with the Tisza family as early as the time of Prime Minister Kálmán Tisza. He studied law in Pécs and Budapest. From 1896, at the age of 23, he served in the public service as a drafting intern at the Prime Minister's Office. From 1911, he rose to the rank of ministerial advisor at the Prime Minister's Office.

The Hungarian prime minister István Tisza appointed Skerlecz ban of Kingdom of Croatia and Slavonia in 1913, shortly before World War I.

On August 6, 1913, an assassination attempt was made against him by Stjepan Dojčić in Zagreb. Skerlecz was shot in the left shoulder with a revolver.

While Croatia-Slavonia was not the site of any battles, Croatian troops, fighting under the Croatian Home Guard, took part in the fighting, much of it in neighbouring Serbia. Skerlecz managed to reconvene the Croatian Sabor (parliament) in Zagreb by 1915. The Croats made further demands for local authority, as well as unification of Croatia-Slavonia with Dalmatia and Bosnia and Herzegovina. Stefan Sarkotić, Austria-Hungary's commander in Bosnia and Herzegovina also sought unification of their provinces. However, Austria-Hungary's outdated political system made any shifts between areas under Hungarian or Austrian spheres of influence difficult. Skerlecz could only support the Croatians in acting autonomously. As the war progressed more Croats found the formation of a South Slav state a potentially beneficial possibility.

He resigned from his post on June 29, 1917, after his political supporter Pm. István Tisza was ousted from power, leaving the country in no better state than when he had arrived. The Kingdom of Serbs, Croats and Slovenes was formed the following year. Skerlecz became persona non grata in Kingdom of Yugoslavia, because he was known as an ardent opponent of the involvement of Croatia in the newly formed Kingdom of Yugoslavia. Skerlecz had to escape to Hungary where he died in Budapest in 1951.

== Marriage ==
On December 21, 1918, in Budapest, he married the divorced Baroness Lilly Amália Gutmann (1882–1954), the former wife of Baron Dr. Gyula Madarassy-Beck (1873-1939), whose parents were Baron Vilmos Gutmann (1847–1921), an industrialist, and Rozália Krausz (1859-1932). Since the marriage did not produce any children, and he was the last male member of his family, the Skerlecz family of Lomnica became extinct with him.

== Sources ==
- "Škrlec, Ivan". Croatian Encyclopedia (in Croatian).
