= Antun Mihalović =

Ban of Croatia from 1917 to 1919

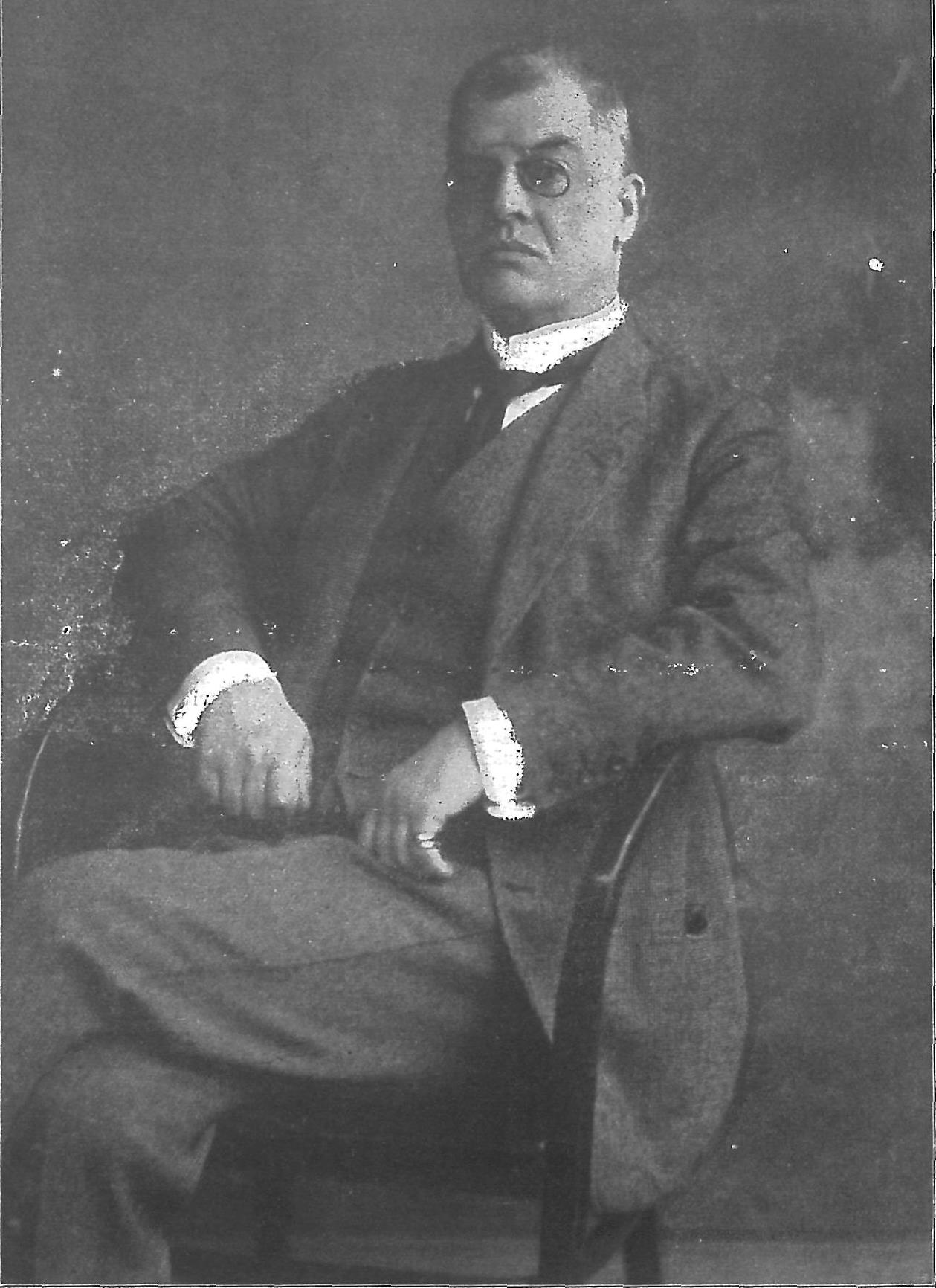

Ban of Croatia-Slavonia
- In office 29 June 1917 – 20 January 1919
- Monarch: Charles I of Austria
- Preceded by: Ivan Skerlecz
- Succeeded by: Ivan Paleček (in Kingdom of Yugoslavia)

Personal details
- Born: 17 July 1868 Feričanci, Croatia-Slavonia, Austria-Hungary
- Died: 21 September 1949 (aged 81) Zagreb, PR Croatia, FPR Yugoslavia
- Occupation: Politician

Antun Mihalović (17 July 1868 – 21 September 1949) was a Croatian politician. He served as ban of Croatia from 29 June 1917 until 20 January 1919. He was a member of a noble family Mihalović, whose oldest known member (Demeter pl. Mihalović) came from Macedonia to Croatia (to the city of Orahovica) in 1733.
