= Ljubo Boban =

Croatian historian and academic

Ljubo Boban (10 May 1933 – 9 October 1994) was a Croatian historian and academic.

He was born in Solin. At the University of Zagreb's Faculty of Philosophy, he graduated and later obtained a PhD degree in 1964 with a thesis on the 1939 Cvetković–Maček Agreement. He became professor at the same faculty in 1975. In 1986 he became full member of the Croatian Academy of Sciences and Arts and in 1991 he was made member of its presidency.

Boban died of a heart attack in Zagreb on 9 October 1994.
