= National Home Palace =

Palace located in Gornji Grad

Coordinates: 45.8177°N 15.9753°E

National Home
- Narodni dom
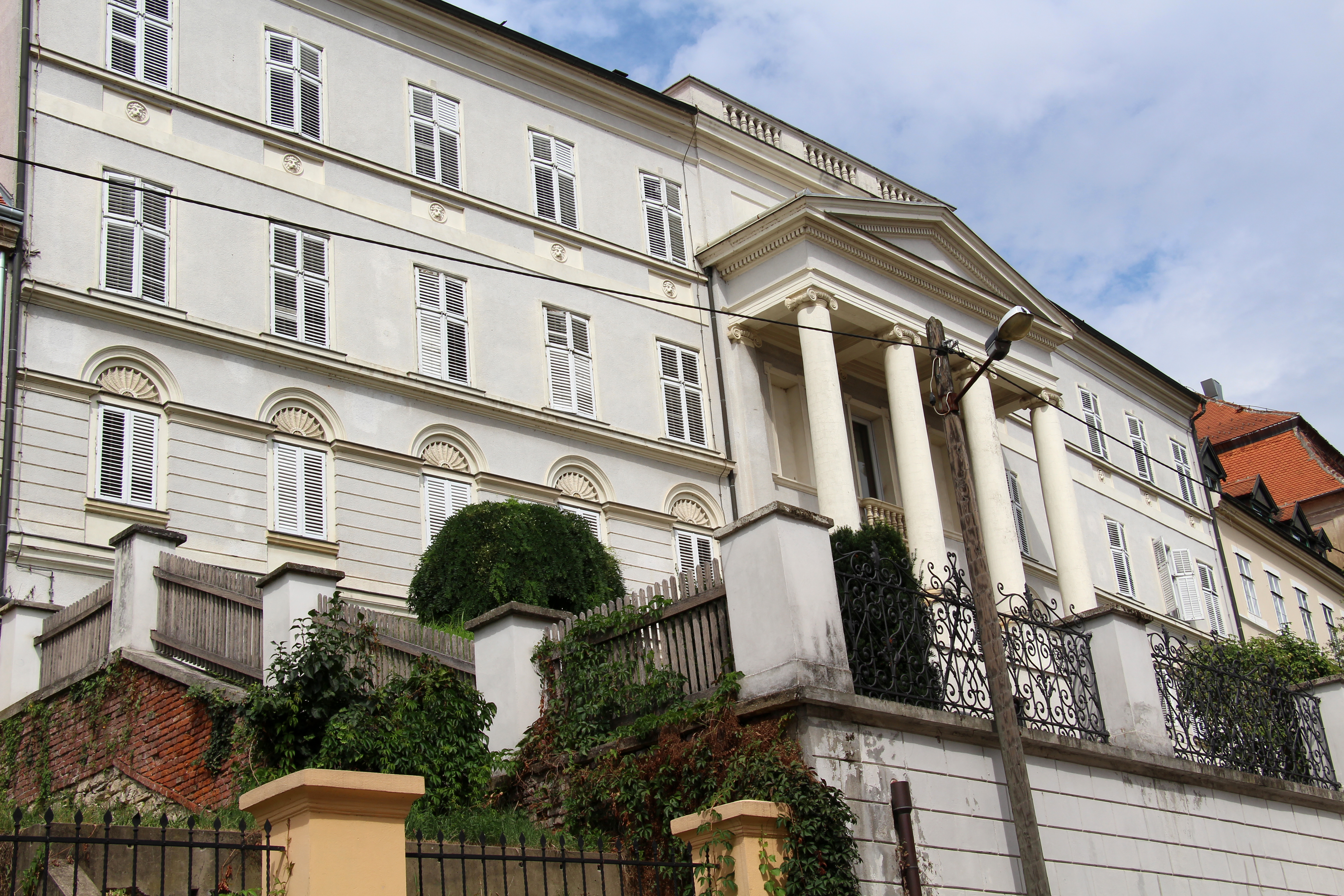
- National Home palace from Radićeva street
- Interactive map of the National Home area
- Alternative names: Drašković's Palace

General information
- Architectural style: Neoclassicism
- Location: Opatička street 18, Zagreb
- Completed: 1843; 183 years ago
- Client: Karlo Drašković
- Owner: Croatian Academy of Sciences and Arts

Design and construction
- Architect: Bartol Felbinger

The National Home Palace (Croatian: Palača Narodni dom) is a palace located in Gornji Grad, the old town of the Croatian capital of Zagreb, at Opatička Street 18. The palace is currently owned by the Croatian Academy of Sciences and Arts and hosts its Institute for the History of Croatian Literature, Theatre and Music.

== History ==
On the site of today's palace there was a once monastery used by the Order of Saint Clare. After the order was banned by an imperial edict in 1782, the land was abandoned until Count Karlo Drašković bought it in 1835 with intention to build a residence for his family. The palace was complicated in late 1838, and is believed to be the work of architect Bartol Felbinger. This is corroborated by the fact that Felbinger was sued in 1843 because the portico on the east façade of the palace collapsed. The only question is whether the palace was built to Felbinger's own plans, because its three blueprints which are kept in the Croatian History Museum are unsigned and undated.

At the time of construction the National Home Palace was one of the most beautiful palaces in Gornji Grad. It was built in the Neoclassical style with an overdressed façade and impressive Classicist interior. Drašković family never fully settled in their newly built home, so they sold it under favorable terms to the members of the Illyrian movement. Specifically, in 1845, the Illyrians heard that Count Drašković was selling his Palace with more than 30 rooms for 28 thousand silver florins, or 25 silver florins for each room. They intended to use the palace to house the National Museum with a reading room and a casino, as well as the Croatian-Slavonian Economic Society. On 27 February 1846, they bought the palace and named it the National Home or National Hall (Dvorana), after the largest room which they used for social gatherings, balls and various assemblies. The original purchase agreement is today kept in the National and University Library in Zagreb.

The luxurious hall known as the Casino, National Hall, Hall of Zagreb, Illyrian Hall, and today the Revival Hall, dominates the palace's interior. The central part of the ground floor housed the Croatian National Museum since 1846, while the wings were occupied by the Husbandry Society, the reading room and the casino. The interior was renovated by architect Aleksandar Brdarić. This palace became the centre of all important cultural, educational and other social events of 19th-century Zagreb, while the hall was used for political gatherings and balls. On 25 March 1848, the Demands of the Nation were adopted in a session of the Grand National Assembly held in the grand hall.

From 1868 to 1880 the National Home Palace was the seat of the Yugoslav Academy of Sciences and Arts (today the Croatian Academy of Sciences and Arts). In 1878, palace was purchased by the state which turned it into the seat of the Table of Seven, the supreme court of the Kingdom of Croatia-Slavonia. The palace was owned by the state until the end of World War II when it was given over to the academy. The palace had lost its original charm over the years because the interior was converted into office space. It was restored to its original state in 1994. Today, the palace hosts the Institute for the History of Croatian Literature, Theater and Music of the Croatian Academy of Science and Arts.
