= Koloman Bedeković =

Ban of Croatia from 1871 to 1872

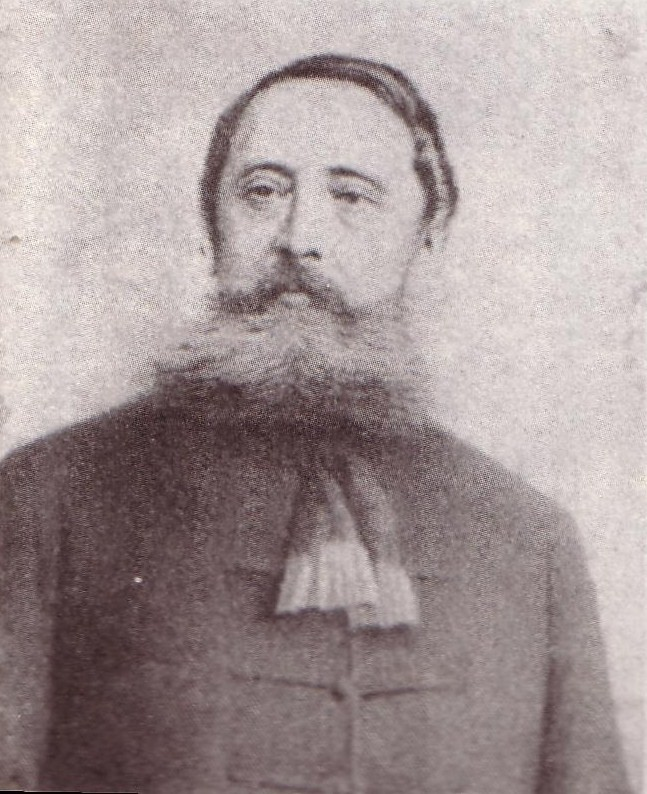

Minister of Croatian Affairs of Hungary
- In office 8 December 1868 – 10 February 1871
- Prime Minister: Gyula Andrássy
- Preceded by: Position established
- Succeeded by: Petar Pejačević
- In office 25 February 1876 – 10 August 1889
- Prime Minister: Kálmán Tisza
- Preceded by: Petar Pejačević
- Succeeded by: Emerik Josipović

Ban of Croatia-Slavonia
- In office 26 January 1871 – 12 February 1872
- Preceded by: Levin Rauch
- Succeeded by: Antun Vakanović

Personal details
- Born: 13 October 1818 Jalžabet, Kingdom of Croatia, Austrian Empire
- Died: 10 October 1889 (aged 70) Hinterbrühl, Lower Austria, Austria-Hungary
- Party: Unionist Party
- Profession: Politician

Koloman Bedeković (Hungarian: Kálmán Bedekovich; 13 October 1818 – 10 August 1889) was a Croatian politician, who served as Minister without portfolio of Croatian Affairs twice: between 1868 and 1871 and between 1876 and 1889. He had a significant role in the creation of Croatian-Hungarian Agreement. In 1871 he was appointed Ban of Croatia-Slavonia.

Bedeković was the leader of the Croatian Unionist Party and fought against his country's independence. As ban he called parliamentary elections in 1871. The People's Party emerged victorious, causing Bedeković to prorogue the Parliament of Croatia three times to prevent it from taking power. Dissatisfaction with the obstruction of parliament led to the Rakovica Revolt. Early elections were subsequently called for 1872. The failure of Bedeković to convene the previous parliament resulted in his removal from the post of ban and replacement with the first non-noble ban, Ivan Mažuranić.

Political offices
Preceded by post created	Minister of Croatian Affairs; 1868–1871	Succeeded by Petar Pejačević
Preceded by Levin Rauch	Ban of Croatia-Slavonia; 1871–1872	Succeeded by Antun Vakanović
Preceded by Petar Pejačević	Minister of Croatian Affairs; 1876–1889	Succeeded by Emerik Josipović
