= Judiciary in Croatia-Slavonia =

Croatian supreme court, 1723–1945

Between 1723 and 1945, the judiciary in Croatia-Slavonia underwent several reorganizations. The Tabula Banalis (Ban's Table), established in 1723, served as the supreme court of the kingdoms of Croatia and Slavonia. Presided over by the Ban of Croatia or his deputy, it acted as a court of first instance in major cases and as an appellate court for county courts. In 1850, it was reorganized as the appellate court for all courts in Croatia and Slavonia, and in 1862 it was superseded as the supreme court by the Royal Table of Seven. The Royal Table of Seven, established in Zagreb in 1862, continued to operate after 1918, was known as the Court of Cassation from 1929, and operated again as the Table of Seven under the Independent State of Croatia before being abolished in 1945.

The main court of first instance in Croatia-Slavonia from 1850 to 1918 was the Zagreb Land Court, later renamed the Royal County Court Table and finally the Royal Court Table; it exercised criminal and major civil jurisdiction.

== Tabula Banalis ==
The Tabula Banalis (Croatian: Banski stol) was the supreme court of Croatia and Slavonia. It was established in 1723 by Charles VI, ruler of the Habsburg monarchy. The court was presided over by the Ban of Croatia or by his deputy. For more important trials it was the first instance court, and served as the court of appeal for verdicts of the county courts (for counties (comitatus) of Croatia and Slavonia).

In 1850 it became the appellate court for all courts in Croatia and Slavonia, including the Land Court, later the Royal Court Table.

From 1862 the supreme court of the Kingdom of Croatia-Slavonia was the Table of Seven (Latin: Tabula Septemviralis, Croatian: Stol sedmorice).

== Royal Court Table ==
The Royal Court Table (Croatian: Kraljevski sudbeni stol) of Zagreb was the main court of first instance in the Kingdom of Croatia-Slavonia between 1850 and 1918. The Habsburg monarchy reorganized its judiciary in 1850 when the Tabula Banalis (Ban's Table) became the appellate court for all courts in Croatia and Slavonia, including the Land Court (Zemaljski sud), renamed to the Royal County Court Table (Kraljevski županijski sudbeni stol) in 1862, and finally the Royal Court Table according to the Organization of Courts of the First Instance Act dated 21 November 1874. It was the court of first instance with criminal and major civil jurisdiction, while the subordinate courts from the area of central Croatia used it as an appellate court until 1850.

== Royal Table of Seven ==
The Royal Table of Seven for the Kingdom of Croatia, Slavonia and Dalmatia (Croatian: Kraljevski Stol sedmorice za kraljevinu Hrvatsku, Slavoniju i Dalmaciju) was founded in Zagreb in 1862 as the supreme court for the Kingdom of Croatia-Slavonia, at the instigation of Ban Ivan Mažuranić. It continued to operate in the first Yugoslavia, from 1929 under the name of the Court of Cassation, and during the NDH under the name of the Table of Seven.

The Table of Seven was established by a royal decree of 9 April 1862, which was implemented by a decision of the Croatian Court Chancellery of 10 June 1862. It began operating on 30 June 1862. It was established at a time when the supreme judicial service was merged with the Ban's office, so that the court was under the presidency of the Ban. By the Law on the Organization of the Judiciary in the Military Border, the Border Department was established at the Table of Seven in 1874. The Department was merged with the Table of Seven by an order of the Ban in 1881, which was confirmed by the Croatian Parliament in a law from 1893.

During the Kingdom of SHS, by royal decree of 28 September 1919, Department B of the Seventh Table was established as the last judicial instance for the Kingdom of SHS - the judiciary was organized according to Austrian laws (Slovenia and Dalmatia). Department B was the supreme judicial authority and the last level in civil (litigation and non-litigation), criminal (as a court of cassation) and disciplinary cases as a disciplinary senate for judges and as a higher disciplinary commission for non-judicial officials. Department B began its work on 15 January 1920. The Court of Cassation Act of 1929 provides for the Court of Cassation as the supreme judicial instance over all regular courts in the country, which means that not one single court was established, but 6 supreme judicial instances for the former Croatian legal area, and from 1932 also for the Međimurje Bench of Seven in Zagreb and the B section of the Zagreb Bench of Seven for the former Austrian legal area.

During the Independent State of Croatia, the Table of Seven was responsible for the territory of the NDH by a legal provision of 31 March 1943. It was abolished by a decision of the Presidency of AVNOJ in 1945.

== Sources ==
- Dabinović, A. Hrvatska državna i pravna povijest : s reprodukcijama najvažnijih dokumenata i slikama. Zagreb : Matica hrvatska, 1940.
- Beuc, Ivan. Povijest institucija državne vlasti Kraljevine Hrvatske, Slavonije i Dalmacije: pravnopovijesne studije. Zagreb : Pravni fakultet, Centar za stručno usavršavanje i suradnju s udruženim radom, 1985.
- "Banski stol Kraljevina Dalmacije, Hrvatske i Slavonije" (in Croatian). Croatian State Archives.
