= Demands of the Nation =

1848 political petition in Croatia

The Demands of the Nation (Croatian: Zahtijevanja naroda) is the name of a political petition that was adopted on 25 March 1848 by the Grand National Assembly of the Kingdom of Croatia. Its 30 points describe the principles and programs of Croatian citizenry, as well as national, state, legal, social and liberal desires to change the Croatian position within the Austrian Empire, and remedy the structure of the government and social issues within Croatia.

== Adoption ==
The Demands of the Nation were read by Ivan Kukuljević Sakcinski at a meeting of Grand National Assembly in the National Home Palace and unanimously adopted. They were the political program of the People's Party which had governed all Croatian counties since 1842. The session of the Grand National Assembly held on 25 March 1848 was a result of the Illyrian movement and social upheavals all across Europe in mid-19th century. It is considered to be the beginning of the modern Croatian Parliament (Sabor). The session is important because it was for the first time in history attended by members of all social classes representing the Triune Kingdom of Croatia, Dalmatia and Slavonia. The session was also attended by the students of the Zagreb People's Orthodox Academy and attenders of the Roman Catholic Episcopal seminary.

The Demands of the Nation were printed in the form of a leaflet with a print run of 15,000 bilingual Croatian-German copies so they could be read and understood by a large number of people.

On 29 March the petition was submitted to Emperor Franz Joseph I by a special Croatian delegation of 400 people led by Ljudevit Gaj. Franz Joseph I did not show any intention to meet the requirements, but Josip Jelačić already forbid Croats to receive any further orders from the Government in Budapest.

== Notable demands ==
The document consists of 30 points with demands which included:

- election of Josip Jelačić to the position of Ban,
- convening Sabor as soon as possible,
- unification of Dalmatia and the Military Frontier to Croatia and Slavonia,
- establishment of the modern University in Croatia,
- Croatian independence from Kingdom of Hungary regarding finance, language and education,
- creation of a Croatian national army
- freedom of press, religion, studying and speech,
- equality for everyone before the courts, public hearings, oral argument, introduction of a jury and accountability of judges,
- suffrage for everyone,
- abolition of class privileges and serfdom.
