= Johann Baptist Coronini-Cronberg =

Ban of Croatia from 1859 to 1860

John Baptist Coronini-Cronberg
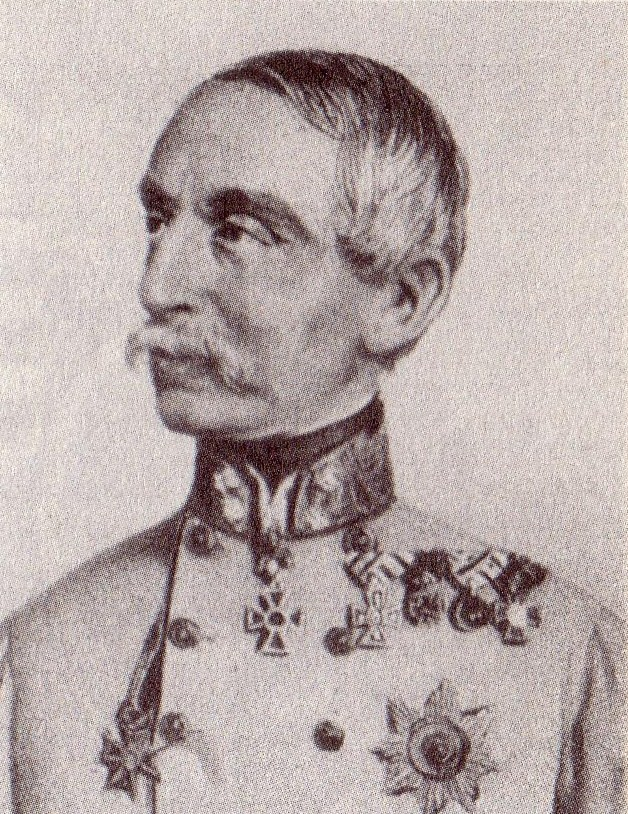

Ban of Croatia
- In office 28 July 1859 – 19 June 1860
- Preceded by: Josip Jelačić
- Succeeded by: Josip Šokčević

Personal details
- Born: 19 November 1794 Vinkovci, Kingdom of Slavonia, Austrian Empire
- Died: 26 July 1880 (aged 85) Vienna, Austria-Hungary

Johann Baptist Coronini-Cronberg (19 November 1794 – 26 July 1880) was an Austrian Feldzeugmeister born in Gorizia. Coronini-Cronberg was governor of the Voivodeship of Serbia and Banat of Temeschwar from 1851 to 1859. He was ban of Croatia from 28 July 1859 to 19 June 1860.

== Occupation of the Danubian principalities ==
General Coronini-Cronberg commanded the Austrian army which occupied the Danubian principalities of Wallachia and Moldavia in 1854, obliging Russian forces to withdraw. After a cursory investigation into 'the personal and official conduct' of the Russian-nominated hospodars, the princes Barbu Știrbei and Grigore Ghica, he ruled that they should be reinstated.
