= Lands of the Crown of Saint Stephen =

Hungarian territories of Austria-Hungary

Coordinates: 47°28′N 19°03′E

Lands of the Crown of Saint Stephen A Magyar Szent Korona Országai (Hungarian) Länder der Krone des Heiligen Stephan (German) Zemlje krune svetog Stjepana (Croatian) Земље круне Светог Стефана (Serbian) Krajiny Svätoštefanskej koruny (Slovak) Țările Coroanei Sfântului Ștefan (Romanian) Země Svatoštěpánské koruny (Czech) Terre della Corona di Santo Stefano (Italian) Kraje Korony Świętego Stefana (Polish)
- 1867–1918
- Top: Flag of Hungary; Bottom: Flag of Croatia-Slavonia Coat of arms (1915–1918)
- Motto: Regnum Mariae Patrona Hungariae ("Kingdom of Mary, the Patroness of Hungary")
- Anthem: "Himnusz"
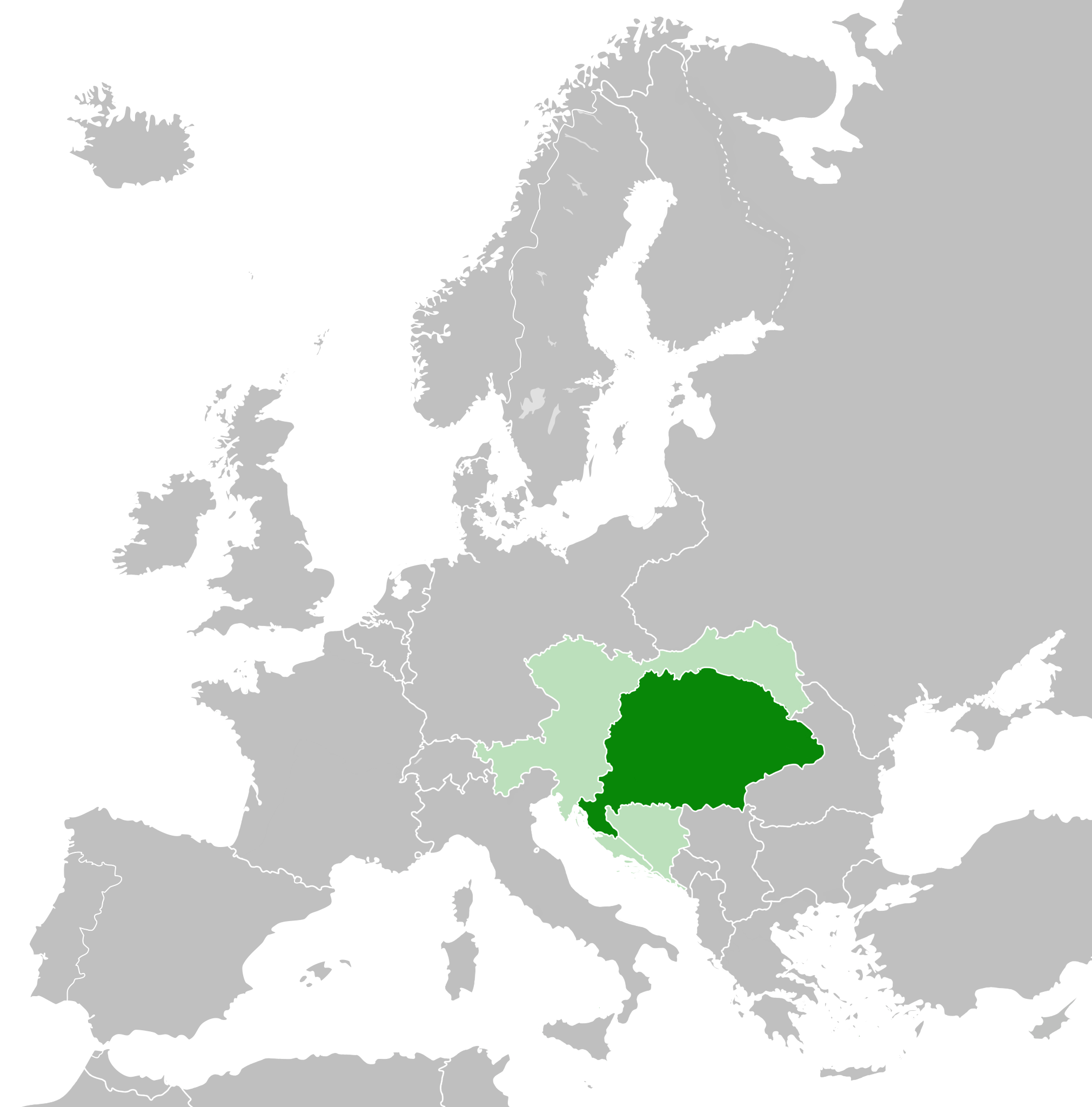
- Transleithania within Austria-Hungary alongside Cisleithania and Bosnia and Herzegovina

- Territory of the Kingdom of Hungary and the Kingdom of Croatia-Slavonia in green (Condominium of Bosnia-Herzegovina in purple)
- Status: Self-governing part of Austria-Hungary political union between Hungary and Croatia-Slavonia (de jure; 1868-1918)
- Capital and largest city: Budapest
- Official languages: Hungarian; Croatian (Croatia-Slavonia); Italian (Fiume); Other spoken languages: Bosnian; Carpathian Romani; German; Polish; Romanian; Ruthenian; Serbian; Slovak; Slovene; Yiddish
- Religion: Latin Catholicism, Calvinism, Lutheranism, Eastern Orthodoxy, Eastern Catholicism, Unitarianism, and Judaism
- Government: Constitutional monarchy
- King
  - 1867–1916: Franz Joseph I
  - 1916–1918: Karl IV
- Ministers-President
  - 1867–1871 (first): Gyula Andrássy
  - 1918 (last): Mihály Károlyi
- Legislature: Diet
  - Upper house: House of Magnates
  - Lower house: House of Representatives
- Historical era: New Imperialism
  - Austro-Hungarian Compromise: 30 March 1867
  - Croatian–Hungarian Settlement: 17 November 1868
  - Bosnian Crisis: 6 October 1908 – 31 March 1909
  - Assassination of Archduke Franz Ferdinand: 28 June 1914
  - Declaration of War on Serbia: 28 July 1914
  - Dissolution of Austria-Hungary: 31 October 1918
  - Eckartsau Declaration: 13 November 1918
  - Monarchy abolished: 16 November 1918
  - Treaty of Trianon: 4 June 1920
- Currency: Forint (1867–1892); Korona (1892–1918)
Preceded by
Kingdom of Hungary (1526–1867)
Austrian Empire
Principality of Transylvania (1711–1867)
Succeeded by
First Hungarian Republic
State of Slovenes, Croats and Serbs
First Czechoslovak Republic
Second Polish Republic
Kingdom of Romania
Italian Regency of Carnaro
Banat Republic

The Lands of the Crown of Saint Stephen (Hungarian: a Szent Korona Országai, lit. 'Countries of the Holy Crown'), informally Transleithania (meaning the lands or region "beyond" the Leitha River), were the Hungarian territories of Austria-Hungary, throughout the latter's entire existence (30 March 1867 – 16 November 1918), and which disintegrated following its dissolution. The name referenced the historic coronation crown of Hungary, known as the Crown of Saint Stephen of Hungary, which had a symbolic importance to the Kingdom of Hungary.

According to the First Article of the Croatian–Hungarian Settlement of 1868, this territory, also called Arch-Kingdom of Hungary (Archiregnum Hungaricum, pursuant to Medieval Latin terminology), was officially defined as "a state union of the Kingdom of Hungary and the Triune Kingdom of Croatia, Slavonia and Dalmatia". Though Dalmatia actually lay outside the Lands of the Crown of Saint Stephen, being part of Cisleithania, the Austrian half of the empire, it was nevertheless included in its name, due to a long political campaign seeking recognition of the Triune Kingdom, which consisted of a united Croatia, Slavonia and Dalmatia.

== Terms ==
- Hungarian: Szent István Koronájának Országai – Lands of the Crown of Saint Stephen, Szent Korona Országai – Lands of the Holy Crown, Magyar Korona Országai – Lands of the Hungarian Crown, Magyar Szent Korona Országai – Lands of the Hungarian Holy Crown
- Croatian: Zemlje Krune svetog Stjepana – Lands of the Crown of Saint Stephen
- German: Länder der heiligen ungarischen Stephanskrone – Lands of the Holy Hungarian Crown of (Saint) Stephen
- Czech: Země Koruny svatoštěpánské – Lands of the Crown of Saint Stephen
- Slovak: Krajiny Svätoštefanskej koruny – Lands of the Crown of Saint Stephen, Krajiny uhorskej koruny – Lands of the Hungarian Crown
- Serbian: Земље круне Светoг Стефана, romanized: Zemlje krune Svetog Stefana – Lands of the Crown of Saint Stephen
- Romanian: Țările Coroanei Sfântului Ștefan – Lands of the Crown of Saint Stephen
- Polish: Kraje Korony Świętego Stefana – Lands of the Crown of Saint Stephen
- Ukrainian: Землі корони Святого Стефана, romanized: Zemli korony Sviatoho Stefana – Lands of the Crown of Saint Stephen
- Rusyn: Землї короны Сятого Іштвана, romanized: Zemlji korony Siatoho Ištvana – Lands of the Crown of Saint Stephen
- Russian: Земли кoроны Святого Иштвана, romanized: Ziemli korony Sviatova Ištvana – Lands of the Crown of Saint Stephen
Map of the counties of the Lands of the Crown of Saint Stephen

The Lands of the Crown of Saint Stephen consisted of the territories of the Kingdom of Hungary (16) and the Kingdom of Croatia-Slavonia (17).

=== Transleithania ===
Transleithania (Hungarian: Lajtántúl, German: Transleithanien, Croatian: Translajtanija, Polish: Zalitawia, Czech: Zalitavsko, Slovak: Zalitavsko) was an unofficial term for the Lands of the Crown of Saint Stephen.

The Latin name Transleithania referred to the parts of the empire "beyond" (trans) the Leitha (or Lajta) River, as most of its area lay to the east of that river – or "beyond" it, from an Austrian perspective. Cisleithania, the Habsburg lands of the Dual Monarchy that had been part of the Holy Roman Empire, along with Galicia and Dalmatia, lay to the west (on "this" side) of the Leitha River.

The territory reached from the arc of the Carpathian Mountains in present-day Slovakia to the Croatian coast of the Adriatic Sea. The capital of Transleithania was Budapest.

Following the Hungarian victory at the Battle of Pressburg in 907, the Hungarian frontier advanced to the Enns River. In 984, after the Germans captured Melk, Grand Prince Géza withdrew Hungarian forces from the territories west of the Vienna Woods and the Kahlenberg. The peace treaty concluded between Géza and Henry (later Emperor Henry II from 1014) in 996 established the Leitha River as the historical border between Hungary and the German lands.

== Crown lands ==
After the Austro-Hungarian Compromise of 1867, Transleithania consisted of the Kingdom of Hungary (which included Hungary proper as well as the territories of the former Principality of Transylvania (Erdélyi Fejedelemség) and the former Voivodeship of Serbia and Banat of Temeschwar), the internally self-governed Kingdom of Croatia-Slavonia, and the free port of Rijeka (Fiume). The Military Frontier was under separate administration until 1873–1882, when it was abolished and incorporated into the Kingdom of Hungary and the Kingdom of Croatia-Slavonia.

Flag of Hungary

Flag of Croatia-Slavonia

=== Kingdoms ===
- Kingdom of Hungary
- Kingdom of Croatia-Slavonia (from 1868)
  - Kingdom of Croatia (1527–1868)
  - Kingdom of Slavonia (1699–1868)

=== Free Cities ===
- Free City of Fiume

=== Condominium ===
- Condominium of Bosnia and Herzegovina (governed jointly by Cisleithania and Transleithania)

== History ==
The Compromise of 1867, which created the Dual Monarchy, gave the Hungarian government more control of its domestic affairs than it had possessed at any time since the Battle of Mohács (see fig. 4). However, the new government faced severe economic problems and the growing restiveness of ethnic minorities. The First World War led to the disintegration of Austria-Hungary, and in the aftermath of the war, a series of governments—including a communist regime—assumed power in Buda and Pest (in 1872 the cities of Buda and Pest united to become Budapest).

=== Constitutional and legal framework ===
The Transleithanian lands were under the rule of the Austrian Emperor Franz Joseph I as Apostolic King of Hungary and King of Croatia and Slavonia. He was succeeded by his grand-nephew Emperor Charles I (King Charles IV) in 1916.

Once again a Habsburg emperor became king of Hungary, but the compromise strictly limited his power over the country's internal affairs, and the Hungarian government assumed control over its domestic affairs. The Hungarian government consisted of a prime minister and cabinet appointed by the emperor but responsible to the Diet of Hungary, a bicameral parliament elected by a narrow franchise. The Diet was convened by Minister-President Count Gyula Andrássy on 18 February 1867,

Joint Austro-Hungarian affairs were managed through "common" ministries of foreign affairs, defense, and finance. The respective ministers were responsible to delegations representing separate Austrian and Hungarian parliaments. Although the "common" ministry of defense administered the imperial and royal armies, the emperor acted as their commander in chief, and German remained the language of command in the military as a whole. The compromise designated that commercial and monetary policy, tariffs, the railroad, and indirect taxation were "common" concerns to be negotiated every ten years. The compromise also returned Transylvania to Hungary's jurisdiction.

At Franz Joseph's insistence, Hungary and Croatia reached a similar compromise in 1868, the Nagodba, giving Croatia a special status in the Lands of the Holy Hungarian Crown. In fact, this half of Austria-Hungary was officially defined (art. 1) as "a state union of the Kingdom of Hungary and the Triune Kingdom of Croatia, Slavonia and Dalmatia". The agreement recognized Croatia's distinct identity and granted Croatia autonomy over its internal affairs, exercised by the Sabor (assembly) of the former Kingdom of Croatia. The Sabor gained partial authority to legislate in the areas of justice, education and religious matters, and interior affairs. In practice, however, this autonomy was fairly limited. The Croatian Ban would now be nominated by the Hungarian prime minister and appointed by the king. Areas of common policies included finance, currency matters, commercial policy, the post office, and the railroads. Croatian became the official language of Croatia's government, and Croatian representatives discussing "common" affairs before the Hungarian diet were permitted to speak Croatian.

Transleithania did not have its own flag. According to the Nagodba (art. 62 and 63), in all joint Croatian and Hungarian affairs symbols of both Croatia and Hungary respectively had to be used. For instance, whenever the joint Hungarian-Croatian Parliament held a session, the Croatian flag and Hungarian flag were both hoisted on the parliament building in Budapest. In Vienna, in front of Schönbrunn Palace, a black and yellow flag was flown for Cisleithania, but both Croatian and Hungarian flags were flown for Transleithania. When in 1915 a new small official coat of arms of Austria-Hungary was released, composed of the Austrian and Hungarian coats-of-arms only, the Croatian government protested, since it was a breach of the Nagodba. Vienna responded quickly and included the Croatian coat of arms.

The Nationalities Law enacted in 1868 defined Hungary as a single Hungarian nation comprising different nationalities whose members enjoyed equal rights in all areas except language. Although non-Hungarian languages could be used in local government, churches, and schools, Hungarian became the official language of the central government and universities. Many Hungarians thought the act too generous, while minority-group leaders rejected it as inadequate. Slovaks in northern Hungary, Romanians in Transylvania, and Serbs in Vojvodina all wanted more autonomy, and unrest followed the act's passage. The government took no further action concerning nationalities, and discontent about Magyarization fermented.

Anti-Semitism appeared in Hungary early in the century as a result of fear of economic competition. In 1840 a partial emancipation of the Jews allowed them to live anywhere except certain depressed mining cities. The Jewish Emancipation Act of 1868 gave Jews equality before the law and effectively eliminated all bars to their participation in the economy; nevertheless, informal barriers kept Jews from careers in politics and public life.

=== Rise of the Liberal Party ===
Franz Joseph appointed Gyula Andrássy—a member of Ferenc Deák's party—prime minister in 1867. His government strongly favored the Austro-Hungarian Compromise of 1867 and followed a laissez-faire economic policy. Guilds were abolished, workers were permitted to bargain for wages, and the government attempted to improve education and construct roads and railroads. Between 1850 and 1875, Hungary's farms prospered: grain prices were high, and exports tripled. But Hungary's economy accumulated capital too slowly, and the government relied heavily on foreign credits. In addition, the national and local bureaucracies began to grow immediately after the compromise became effective. Soon the cost of the bureaucracy outpaced the country's tax revenues, and the national debt soared. After an economic downturn in the mid-1870s, Deák's party succumbed to charges of financial mismanagement and scandal.

As a result of these economic problems, Kálmán Tisza's Liberal Party, created in 1875, gained power in 1875. Tisza assembled a bureaucratic political machine that maintained control through corruption and manipulation of a woefully unrepresentative electoral system. In addition, Tisza's government had to withstand both dissatisfied nationalities and Hungarians who thought Tisza too submissive to the Austrians. The Liberals argued that the Dual Monarchy improved Hungary's economic position and enhanced its influence in European politics.

Tisza's government raised taxes, balanced the budget within several years of coming to power, and completed large road, railroad, and waterway projects. Commerce and industry expanded quickly. After 1880 the government abandoned its laissez-faire economic policies and encouraged industry with loans, subsidies, government contracts, tax exemptions, and other measures. Between 1890 and 1910, the proportion of Hungarians employed in industry doubled to 24.2%, while the proportion dependent on agriculture dropped from 82% to 62%. However, the 1880s and 1890s were depression years for the peasantry. Rail and steamship transport gave North American farmers access to European markets, and Europe's grain prices fell by 50 percent. Large landowners fought the downturn by seeking trade protection and other political remedies; the lesser nobles, whose farms failed in great numbers, sought positions in the still-burgeoning bureaucracy. By contrast, the peasantry resorted to subsistence farming and worked as laborers to earn money.

=== Social changes ===
Hungary's population rose from 13 million to 20 million between 1850 and 1910. After 1867 Hungary's feudal society gave way to a more complex society that included the magnates, lesser nobles, middle class, working class, and peasantry. However, the magnates continued to wield great influence through several conservative parties because of their massive wealth and dominant position in the upper chamber of the diet. They fought modernization and sought both closer ties with Vienna and a restoration of Hungary's traditional social structure and institutions, arguing that agriculture should remain the mission of the nobility. They won protection from the market by reestablishment of a system of entail and also pushed for restriction of middle-class profiteering and restoration of corporal punishment. The Roman Catholic Church was a major ally of the magnates.

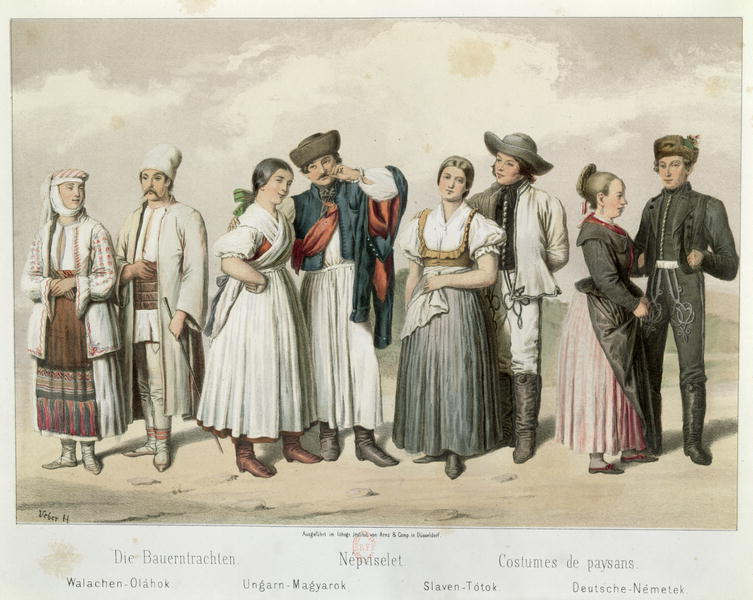
Costumes of inhabitants of the Kingdom of Hungary: Romanian, Hungarian (Magyar), Slovak and German peasants

Some lesser-noble landowners survived the agrarian depression of the late 19th century and continued farming. Many others turned to the bureaucracy or to the professions.

In the mid-19th century, Hungary's middle class consisted of a small number of German and Jewish merchants and workshop owners who employed a few craftsmen. By the turn of the 20th century, however, the middle class had grown in size and complexity and had become predominantly Jewish. In fact, Jews created the modern economy that supported Tisza's bureaucratic machine. In return, Tisza not only denounced anti-Semitism but also used his political machine to check the growth of an anti-Semitic party. In 1896 his successors passed legislation securing the Jews' final emancipation. By 1910 about 900,000 Jews made up approximately 5 percent of the population and about 23 percent of Hungary's citizenry. Jews accounted for 54 percent of commercial business owners, 85 percent of financial institution directors and owners, and 62 percent of all employees in commerce.

The rise of a working class came naturally with industrial development. By 1900 Hungary's mines and industries employed nearly 1.2 million people, representing 13 percent of the population. The government favored low wages to keep Hungarian products competitive on foreign markets and to prevent impoverished peasants from flocking to the city to find work. The government recognized the right to strike in 1884, but labor came under strong political pressure. In 1890 the Social Democratic Party was established and secretly formed alliances with the trade unions. The party soon enlisted one-third of Budapest's workers. By 1900 the party and union rolls listed more than 200,000 hard-core members, making it the largest secular organization the country had ever known. The diet passed laws to improve the lives of industrial workers, including providing medical and accident insurance, but it refused to extend them voting rights, arguing that broadening the franchise would give too many non-Hungarians the vote and threaten Hungarian domination. After the Compromise of 1867, the Hungarian government also launched an education reform in an effort to create a skilled, literate labor force. As a result, the literacy rate had climbed to 80 percent by 1910. Literacy raised the expectations of workers in agriculture and industry and made them ripe for participation in movements for political and social change.

The plight of the peasantry worsened drastically during the Long Depression at the end of the 19th century. The rural population grew, and the size of the peasants' farm plots shrank as land was divided up by successive generations. By 1900 almost half of the country's landowners were scratching out a living from plots too small to meet basic needs, and many farm workers had no land at all. Many peasants chose to emigrate, and their departure rate reached approximately 50,000 annually in the 1870s and about 200,000 annually by 1907. The peasantry's share of the population dropped from 72.5 percent in 1890 to 68.4 percent in 1900. The countryside also was characterized by unrest, to which the government reacted by sending in troops, banning all farm-labor organizations, and passing other repressive legislation.

In the late 19th century, the Liberal Party passed laws that enhanced the government's power at the expense of the Roman Catholic Church. The parliament won the right to veto clerical appointments, and it reduced the church's nearly total domination of Hungary's education institutions. Additional laws eliminated the church's authority over a number of civil matters and, in the process, introduced civil marriage and divorce procedures.

The Liberal Party also worked with some success to create a unified, Magyarized state. Ignoring the Nationalities Law, they enacted laws that required the Hungarian language to be used in local government and increased the number of school subjects taught in that language. After 1890 the government succeeded in Magyarizing educated Slovaks, Germans, Croats, and Romanians and co-opting them into the bureaucracy, thus robbing the minority nationalities of an educated elite. Most minorities never learned to speak Hungarian, but the education system made them aware of their political rights, and their discontent with Magyarization mounted. Bureaucratic pressures and heightened fears of territorial claims against Hungary after the creation of new nation-states in the Balkans forced Tisza to outlaw "national agitation" and to use electoral legerdemain to deprive the minorities of representation. Nevertheless, in 1901 Romanian and Slovak national parties emerged undaunted by incidents of electoral violence and police repression.

=== Political and economic situation in 1905–1919 ===
Tisza directed the Liberal government until 1890, and for fourteen years thereafter a number of Liberal prime ministers held office. Agricultural decline continued, and the bureaucracy could no longer absorb all of the pauperized lesser nobles and educated people who could not find work elsewhere. This group gave its political support to the Party of Independence and the Party of Forty-Eight, which became part of the "national" opposition that forced a coalition with the Liberals in 1905. The Party of Independence resigned itself to the existence of the Dual Monarchy and sought to enhance Hungary's position within it; the Party of Forty-Eight, however, deplored the Compromise of 1867, argued that Hungary remained an Austrian colony, and pushed for formation of a Hungarian national bank and an independent customs zone.

Franz Joseph refused to appoint members of the coalition to the government until they renounced their demands for concessions from Austria concerning the military. When the coalition finally gained power in 1906, the leaders retreated from their opposition to the compromise of 1867 and followed the Liberal Party's economic policies. Istvan Tisza—Kalman Tisza's son and prime minister from 1903 to 1905—formed the new National Party of Work, which in 1910 won a large majority in the parliament. Tisza became prime minister for a second time in 1912 after labor strife erupted over an unsuccessful attempt to expand voting rights.

In the Treaty of Bucharest (1918), Austria-Hungary gained its last extensions. Romania ceded 5,513 km^{2} to Austria-Hungary, of which 3,249 km^{2} went to Hungary.

=== Cessation ===
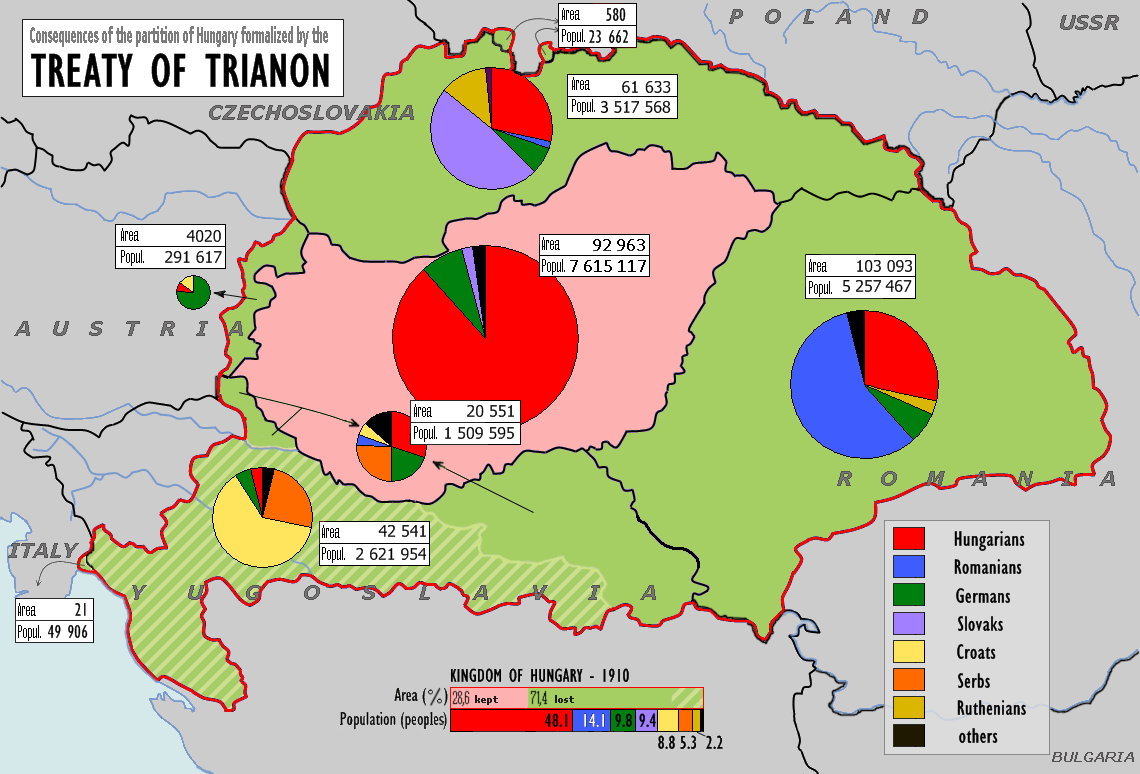
Difference between the borders of the Kingdom of Hungary and Hungary after the Treaty of Trianon

At the end of the First World War, the existence of Transleithania came to an end. The Croats, with other South Slav nations, had wanted a separate state and status equal to the Austrians and the Hungarians in the monarchy since the beginning of the union in 1867 and 1868. After many attempts which were always vetoed by the Hungarian side, the Hungarian Council of Ministers, led by Hungarian prime minister Sándor Wekerle and Count István Tisza, finally signed the trialist manifest on 22 October 1918, a day after King Charles did so. Since it was too late to reform the Imperial and Royal monarchy, on 29 October 1918 the Croatian Parliament (Sabor) in Zagreb unified the Croatian lands and ended the union and all ties with Austria and Hungary (particularly Article 1 of the Nagodba of 1868) and decided to join the National Council of the State of Slovenes, Croats and Serbs (on 1 December 1918 it united with the Kingdom of Serbia to form the Kingdom of Serbs, Croats and Slovenes). The city of Fiume became the short-lived Free State of Fiume until 1924, when it was ceded to Italy. The territories of the southern Hungarian counties in Banat, Bácska and Baranya (the west of Temes County, Torontál County, Bács-Bodrog County and Baranya County) as a Province of Banat, Bačka and Baranja became part of the Kingdom of Serbs, Croats and Slovenes.

In desperation, Charles appointed Mihály Károlyi, who advocated looser ties between Austria and Hungary, as prime minister. Under Károlyi's prodding, the Hungarian parliament terminated the Austro-Hungarian Compromise as of 31 October 1918.

On 13 November, Charles announced that he accepted Hungary's right to determine the form of the state, and relinquished his right to take part in Hungary's politics. He also released the officials in the Hungarian half of the monarchy from their oath of loyalty to him. Although it is sometimes reckoned as an abdication, Charles deliberately avoided using the term in the event the Hungarian people recalled him. However, Károlyi and his government were unwilling to wait; they proclaimed the Hungarian Democratic Republic on 16 November. However, King Charles IV never abdicated, and from 1920 until 1944 the nominally restored Kingdom of Hungary was governed by Miklós Horthy as a regent.

== See also ==
- Lands of the Crown of Saint Wenceslaus
- Stephen I of Hungary
