= Triune Kingdom =

Concept of a united kingdom between Croatia, Slavonia and Dalmatia

All three kingdoms were represented in the coat of arms of the Kingdom of Croatia-Slavonia.

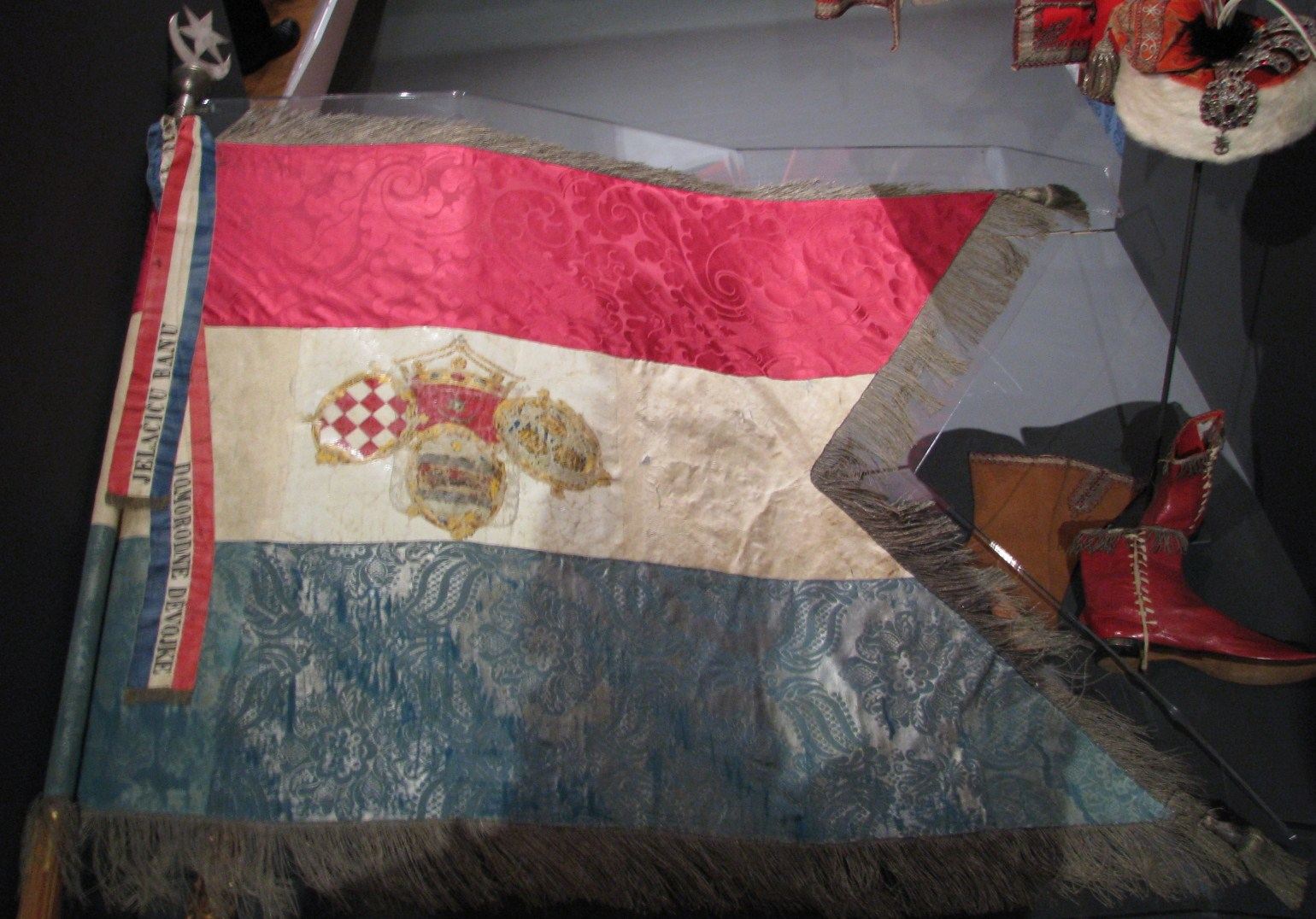
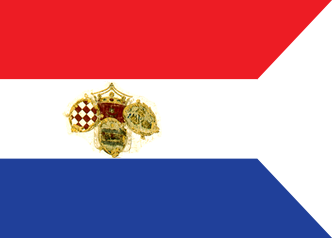
Josip Jelačić Royal Bans Standard, the first tricolor standard with the unified coat of arms of Croatia, Dalmatia and Slavonia used from 1848 until 1859

The Triune Kingdom (Croatian: Trojedna kraljevina) or Triune Kingdom of Croatia, Slavonia and Dalmatia (Croatian: Trojedna Kraljevina Hrvatske, Slavonije i Dalmacije) was the concept—advocated by the leaders of the 19th-century Croatian national revival—of a united kingdom between Croatia, Slavonia and Dalmatia, which were already within the Austrian Empire under one king, who was also the Emperor of Austria, but were politically and administratively separate entities. This concept had roots in the high medieval period, as a successor to the historical Kingdom of Croatia which was made up of those regions.

After 1867, Croatia and Slavonia were within the Hungarian half of Austria-Hungary and were united in 1868 as the Kingdom of Croatia-Slavonia, where the name Triune Kingdom of Croatia, Slavonia and Dalmatia became official. However, Dalmatia, being located in the Austrian half, still remained de facto separate. Until the end of the Austro-Hungarian Empire, several Croatian political parties and groups sought recognition of the Triune Kingdom and the incorporation of Dalmatia into Croatia-Slavonia. The Croatian intelligentsia, especially lawyers and historians, played a key role in interpreting historical sources so as to legitimize the demand for the Triune Kingdom.

== History ==
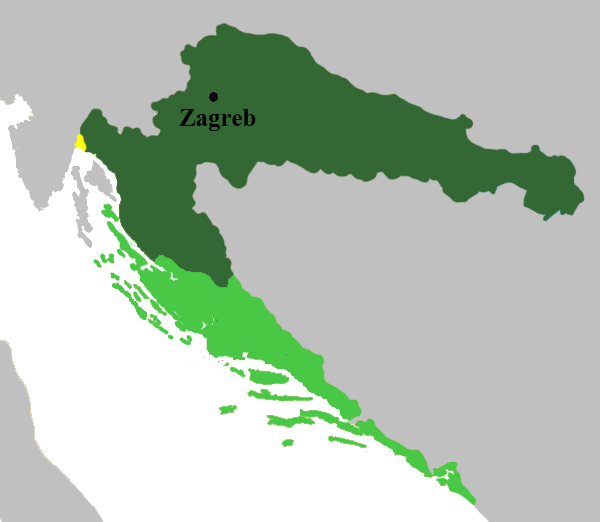
A theoretical map of the Triune Kingdom

The unification among the three Kingdoms started gaining popularity in the 14th century and was originally used in the title of the Ban of Croatia, Slavonia and Dalmatia in the medieval Croatian Kingdom. The first usage of the term Triune Kingdom was in 1527 by the Habsburgs, to make the title of the Croatia, Dalmatia and Slavonia seem grander, this can be seen in titles given to Krsto Frankopan, as well as other examples from 1527. In 1895 Ivan Bojničić, a member of the Croatian Independent People's Party, wrote about this, saying the recognition of the Triune Kingdom was their primary goal. The Croatian Sabor was, in 1681, officially named the Congregatio Croatiae, Dalmatiae et Slavoniae On 7 July 1767, Maria Theresa founded the Royal Council for the Kingdoms of Dalmatia, Croatia and Slavonia. However, only in the early 19th century, in parallel with the demands for the unification of the three Croatian Kingdoms and modern nation building, did the use of the name "Triune Kingdom" intensify.

Prior to 1848, the Croatians had claimed territories which had been contested by both the Hungarians and the Vienna Court War Council within the Austrian Empire, and also by the Ottoman Empire. During the Revolutions of 1848, Croatian nationalists in the Sabor proposed the unification of the Triune Kingdom, which would be an autonomous Croatian cultural and political union within the Habsburg Empire. Political representatives of Croatia advocated the notion to the Emperor, and demanded the unification of the three Croatian kingdoms. During the revolutions, Dalmatia was temporarily under the control of Ban Josip Jelačić of Croatia. However, the Italian-speaking elite dominating the Diet of Dalmatia urged autonomy for the Kingdom as an Austrian crown land – against the Croatian national revival movement's demand for a Triune Kingdom.

Following the Austro-Hungarian Compromise of 1867 and the Croatian–Hungarian Settlement of 1868, the Hungarian claims on Slavonia and the Austrian claims on the Military Frontier were formally relinquished. Croatia and Slavonia were unified into the autonomous Kingdom of Croatia-Slavonia. However, a unification with Dalmatia was denied and while Croatia-Slavonia was incorporated into the Lands of the Crown of Saint Stephen (Hungarian half), Dalmatia remained a crown land of the Cislethanian (Austrian) half of the Dual Monarchy. Croatia-Slavonia nevertheless formally called itself the "Triune Kingdom of Croatia, Slavonia and Dalmatia", pressing its claims on Dalmatia.

Sections of the Croatian–Hungarian Settlement of 1868 became contentious issues, as the Croatian version defined the territory of the "Lands of the Crown of Saint Stephen" as "a state union of the Kingdom of Hungary and the Kingdoms of Dalmatia, Croatia and Slavonia". The Hungarian version of the same settlement meanwhile, referred to it as Croatia, Slavonia and Dalmatia, withholding the word "Kingdom" and changing the order of the countries names. Documents issued by Austria put the order as "Dalmatia, Croatia and Slavonia", after instructions from Friedrich Ferdinand von Beust to distinguish Dalmatia from Croatia and Slavonia in order to emphasize its membership of the Austrian half of the Empire.

During the Croatian National Revival and the second half of the 19th century, Croatian intelligentsia, especially lawyers and historians, in the struggle for a united Triune Kingdom, were involved in interpreting historical sources seeking to legitimize and politically argue the full meaning of the name of the Triune Kingdom. By the end of the 19th century, recognition of the Triune Kingdom was the primary goal of the Independent People's Party, as well as the People's Party of Dalmatia.

In 1874, Ivan Kukuljević Sakcinski published various findings from archival collections—in his work Codex Diplomaticus, now kept in the Croatian State Archives—documents from all periods that speak of the Kingdom of Croatia, Dalmatia and Slavonia, consisting of:

- Privileges – Privilegia Regnorum Croatiae, Dalmatiae et Slavoniae, dated 1377
- Protocols – Protocolla Congregationis generalis Regnorum Croatiae, Dalmatiae et Slavoniae, dated 1557
- Minutes – Acta Congregationum Regni, dated 1562
- Minutes – Transumpta documentorum iura Croatica tangentium, dated 1249

== See also ==
- Trialism in Austria-Hungary

== Sources ==
- Jakić, Ivana; Balta, Ivan (May 2007). "Pregled zbivanja u predpreporodnom i preporodnom razdoblju do osnivanja političkih stranaka (1841.)". Povijesni Zbornik: Godišnjak Za Kulturu I Povijesno Nasljeđe (in Croatian). 1 (1–2). Faculty of Philosophy, University of Osijek: 273–284. ISSN 1846-3819.
- Goldstein, Ivo; Jovanović, Nikolina (1999). Croatia: a history. C. Hurst & Co. Publishers. ISBN 1-85065-525-1.
- Romsics, Ignác; Király, Béla K. (1999). Geopolitics in the Danube Region.
- Korunić, Petar (April 1999). "Hrvatski nacionalni program i društvene promjene za revolucije 1848/49. godine" [National Programme and Social Change during the Revolution in 1848–1849.]. Journal – Institute of Croatian History. 31 (1). Faculty of Philosophy, University of Zagreb: 12–13. ISSN 0353-295X.
- Sabotič, Ines; Matković, Stjepan (April 2005). "Saborski izbori i zagrebačka izborna tijela na prijelazu iz 19. u 20. stoljeće" [Parliamentary Elections and Zagreb Electoral Bodies at the Turn of the 19th and 20th Centuries]. Društvena Istraživanja: Journal for General Social Issues (in Croatian). 14 (1–2 (75–76)). Zagreb, Croatia: Institute of Social Sciences Ivo Pilar. ISSN 1330-0288.
- Motyl, Alexander J. (2001). Encyclopedia of Nationalism, Volume II. Academic Press. ISBN 0-12-227230-7.
- "Trojedna kraljevina" [Triune Kingdom]. Croatian Encyclopedia (in Croatian). Miroslav Krleža Lexicographical Institute (LZMK). 2019.
- Jelavich, Charles; Jelavich, Barbara (1977). The Establishment of the Balkan National States, 1804–1920. University of Washington Press.
- Mandušić, Iva (December 2009). "Hungarian Historian Nicholas (Miklós) Istvánffy (1538–1615) and His Manuscript 'Historiarum De Rebus Ungaricis' in the Croatian Historiography". Croatica Christiana Periodica (in Croatian). 33 (64).
- Bojničić, Ivan (1895). Armorial of the Kingdom of Slavonia. Zagreb.
- Heka, László (2012). "Analiza Austro-ugarske i Hrvatsko-ugarske nagodbe". Zbornik Pravnog Fakulteta Sveučilišta U Rijeci. 38 (Faculty of Law, University of Szeged, Szeged, Hungary): 855–880. doi:10.30925/zpfsr.38.2.7.
- Teich, Mikuláš; Porter, Roy, eds. (28 May 1993). The National Question in Europe in Historical Context. Cambridge University Press. p. 284. ISBN 978-0521367134.
- Jelavich, Barbara (1999). History of the Balkans: Twentieth century.
