= Josip Šokčević =

Ban of Croatia from 1860 to 1867

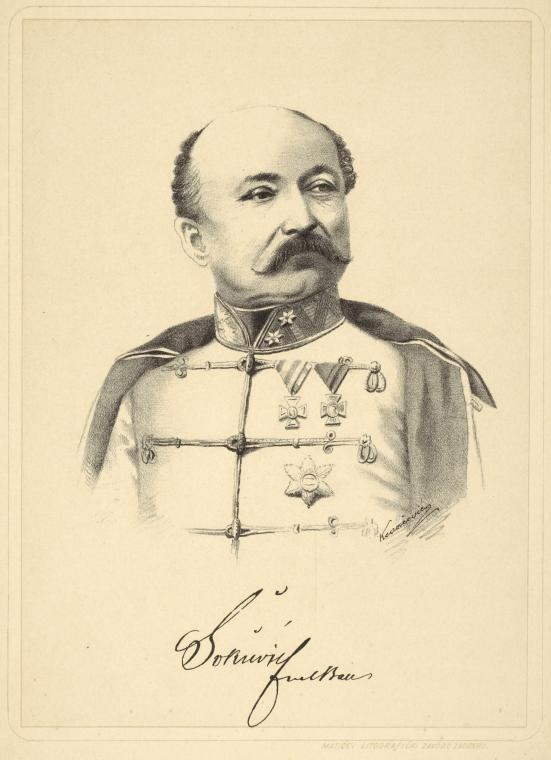

Ban of Croatia
- In office 19 June 1860 – 27 June 1867
- Preceded by: Johann Baptist Coronini-Cronberg
- Succeeded by: Levin Rauch

Personal details
- Born: 7 March 1811 Vinkovci, Kingdom of Slavonia, Austrian Empire
- Died: 16 November 1896 (aged 85) Vienna, Austria-Hungary

Baron Josip Šokčević (German: Joseph Freiherr von Sokcsevits; 7 March 1811 – 16 November 1896) was a Croatian lieutenant marshal in the Austro-Hungarian Army who served as the ban of Croatia and as the governor of the Voivodeship of Serbia and Temes Banat.

== Biography ==
=== Early life ===
He was born in the town of Vinkovci in Slavonia (a historical land and nowadays a geographical region in Croatia). After studying in his birth-town he went to a military academy in 1823 and graduated with honours in 1830.

=== Career ===
His career was going very steeply, starting from the rank of ensign, he was promoted to the rank of colonel in the summer of 1848. He commanded the 37th infantry regiment of Lviv that consisted mainly of Hungarians. With the regiment he besieged and conquered Venice, crushing the Italian revolution against the Austrian Empire.

=== Promotion ===
At 30 he received the rank of major-general and at 46 he became a lieutenant marshal. Then he was transferred from the Slavonian military border to the Supreme military command in Graz. When the Croatian ban and baron Josip Jelačić became ill, Josip Šokčević was appointed the deputy of the ban by the Emperor Franz Joseph I and sent to Zagreb. Later he became the military commander of the Banatian headquarters in Timișoara. In 1860 he was exalted into the class of the Austrian baron, and was appointed as the governor of the Voivodeship of Serbia and Temes Banat.

In the summer of 1860 the Emperor appointed him as the Croatian ban on the advice of the Bishop of Bosnia and Syrmia, Josip Juraj Strossmayer. 1860 was an important year in Habsburg politics, as the Emperor ended the neo-absolutist policies of interior minister Bach.

On the basis of the imperial October diploma, Šokčević convened the Conference of the Bandom that issued new electoral laws for Croatia and gave suggestions on the reorganization of the Habsburg Monarchy. Croatian demands were the same as the peoples demands of 1848, these being a united Croatia and a federative monarchy.

=== Political changes ===
In the spirit of democratization, in the entire Monarchy and in Croatia, old political parties were restored. This was short lived, because the Emperor changed his policy in 1861 when he issued the Februarial patent which diminished the power of all of the parliaments in the lands of the Empire. During his mandate, ban Šokčević proposed the railroad between Vukovar, Zagreb and Rijeka. In 1864 the first annual Dalmatian, Slavonian and Croatian business exhibition was organized.

=== Resignation ===
In 1866 Austria lost its war with Prussia, ending Austria's dominance over the German states. The entire monarchy was in a state of crisis. The Austrians and Hungarians reached the Austro-Hungarian Compromise of 1867, which forced Croatia to reach its own compromise with the Kingdom of Hungary. Ban Šokčević thought that he was deceived by the Austrians and thus resigned from his position on 27 June 1867. He retired from military command duties and from public and political life. He moved to Graz and later Vienna, where he died in near-obscurity.

=== Death ===
In 2002 his remains were transferred to his birthtown of Vinkovci and buried in the tomb chapel of Saint Magdalene that was built at the request of his mother Elisabeth.
