= Croatian–Hungarian Settlement =

1868 document governing Croatia's political status in Hungary

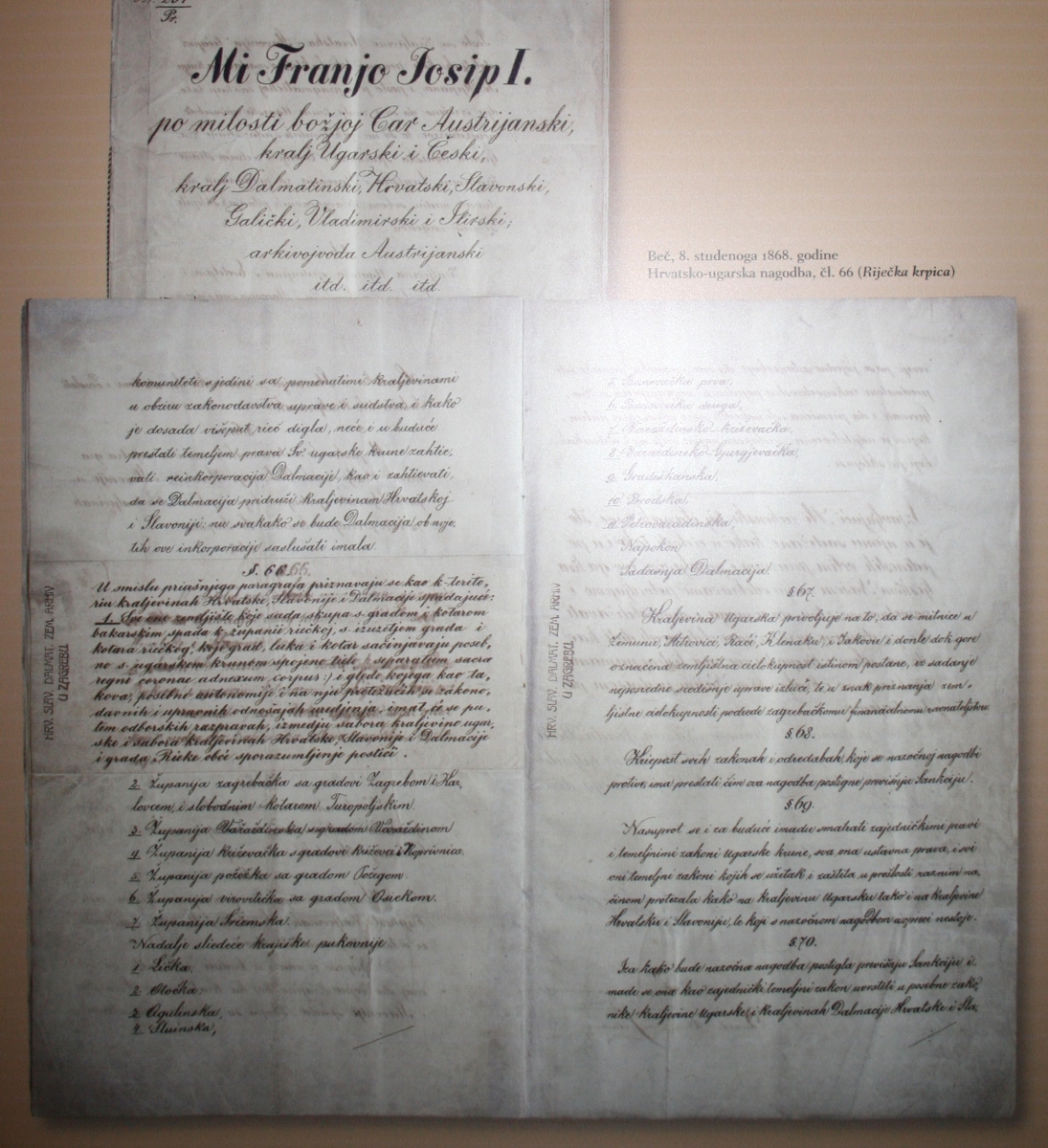
- The part of the Settlement regarding Rijeka is shown "patched"
- Created: 1868
- Purpose: Governing Croatia's political status in the Hungarian-ruled part of Austria-Hungary

The Croatian–Hungarian Settlement (Croatian: Hrvatsko-ugarska nagodba; Hungarian: magyar–horvát kiegyezés; German: Kroatisch-Ungarischer Ausgleich) was a pact signed in 1868 that governed Croatia's political status in the Hungarian-ruled part of Austria-Hungary. It lasted until the end of World War I, when the Croatian Parliament, as the representative of the historical sovereignty of Croatia, decided on 29 October 1918 to end all state and legal ties with the old Austria-Hungary.

== Background ==
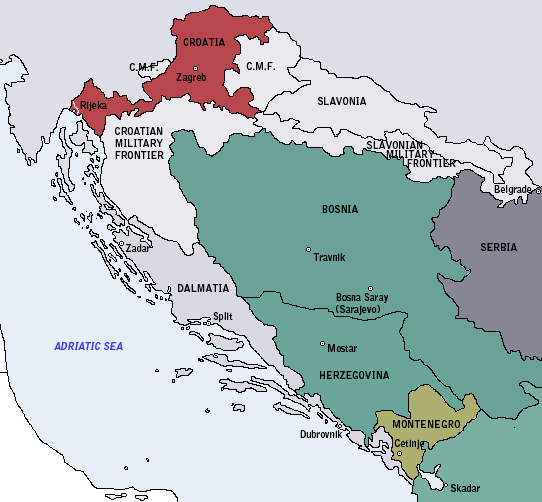
The borders of Croatian crownlands before the Settlement.

Before the Revolutions of 1848 in the Habsburg areas and the notable actions of Croatian Ban Josip Jelačić, the northern Croatian lands were divided into the Kingdom of Croatia and the Kingdom of Slavonia as separate Habsburg crown lands, recognized as Lands of the Crown of St. Stephen and under the jurisdiction of the Kingdom of Hungary but effectively functioned a single kingdom, subordinate to the central government in Vienna. After 1849, Slavonia and Croatia continued to function in the same capacity. Imperial officials referred to this kingdom simply as the Kingdom of Croatia-Slavonia.

The southern Croatian land, the Kingdom of Dalmatia, was formed from the southern parts of the Illyrian Provinces that the Habsburg monarchy conquered from the French Empire in 1815 and it remained a separate administrative division of the Austrian part of the monarchy.

When the Austro-Hungarian Compromise of 1867 created the Austro-Hungarian Dual Monarchy, the Habsburg crownlands of Croatia and Slavonia were effectively merged and placed under Hungarian jurisdiction. Levin Rauch became the acting ban of Croatia, replacing Josip Šokčević.

Ban Rauch prepared a new electoral law that was imposed by the king on 20 October 1867; it reduced the number of elected representatives to 66 and increased the number of unelected ones (the so-called virilist members). In the election held from 19 November to 23 December 1867, the People's Party won only 14 seats, and Rauch's Unionist Party obtained a majority in the Sabor. Although many Croats who sought full autonomy for the South Slavs of the empire objected to that arrangement, that questionable session of Sabor confirmed the subordination of Croatia to Hungary by accepting the Nagodba on 24 September 1868.

== Description ==
The Settlement confirmed the existing territorial distinction between Croatia-Slavonia, number 17, and the remainder of the Kingdom of Hungary. Dalmatia, number 5, was the other Croatian kingdom within Austria-Hungary.

The name Triune Kingdom of Croatia, Slavonia, and Dalmatia was used to refer to the combination of all three Croatian kingdoms, as they were all represented in the coat of arms of the Kingdom of Croatia-Slavonia.

An agreement was reached between the Diet of Hungary on the one hand and the Diet of Croatia on the other hand, with regard to resolving by a joint enactment the constitutional questions at issue between them. After the settlement was confirmed, enforced and sanctioned by His Imperial and Royal Apostolic Majesty, i.e. the Emperor of Austria/King of Hungary, it was thereby incorporated as a joint fundamental law of Hungary and of Croatia, Slavonia and Dalmatia.

With this compromise the Croatian parliament elected 29 deputies (40 after reincorporation of Croatian Military Frontier and Slavonian Military Frontier in 1881) to the House of Representatives and two members (three after 1881) to the House of Magnates of the Diet of Hungary, which controlled the military, the financial system, legislation and administration, sea law, commercial law, the law of bills of exchange and mining law, and generally matters of commerce, customs, telegraphs, the post office, railways, harbors, shipping, and those roads and rivers which jointly concerned Hungary and Croatia-Slavonia.

Following the settlement, the Croatian kingdom was referred to using the name Kingdom of Croatia-Slavonia. Article 66 of the settlement the specified lands of the Kingdom of Croatia-Slavonia, including Dalmatia in the list, even though Dalmatia remained part of Cisleithania until dissolution of Austria-Hungary. (The name Triune Kingdom of Croatia, Slavonia and Dalmatia was sometimes used to express this aspiration.) Practical territorial consequences of the settlement were creation of the city and port of Fiume (now Rijeka) as a corpus separatum attached to the Kingdom of Hungary (pursuant to the article 66) and incorporation of the Croatian Military Frontier and the Slavonian Military Frontier in the Kingdom of Croatia-Slavonia (pursuant to articles 65 and 66) in 1881.

The manner by which Article 66 was handled left the issue of the port of Fiume (Rijeka) unresolved; Croatia saw it as part of its territory, but Hungary saw it as Corpus separatum.

== See also ==
- Kingdom of Croatia-Slavonia
- Timeline of Croatian history
