= Antun Vakanović =

Croatian politician (1808–1894)

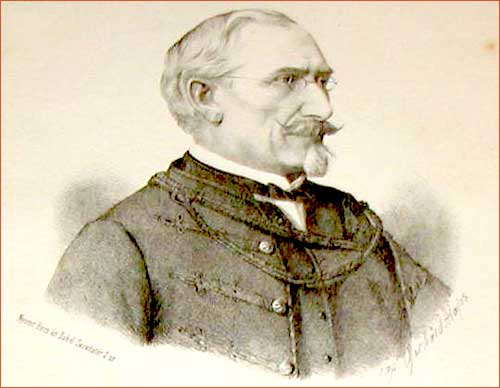

Ban of Croatia-Slavonia (acting)
- In office 17 February 1872 – 20 September 1873
- Preceded by: Koloman Bedeković
- Succeeded by: Ivan Mažuranić

Personal details
- Born: 21 January 1808; Kostajnica, Military Frontier, Austrian Empire (now Croatia)
- Died: 24 March 1894 (aged 86); Zagreb, Croatia-Slavonia, Austria-Hungary (now Croatia)
- Political party: Unionist Party
- Profession: Politician

Antun Vakanović (21 January 1808 – 24 March 1894) was a politician from Croatia. He served as acting ban of Croatia from 17 February 1872 until 20 September 1873.

Political offices
Preceded by Koloman Bedeković	Ban of Croatia-Slavonia (acting); 1872–1873	Succeeded by Ivan Mažuranić
