= Petar Pejačević =

Croatian politician

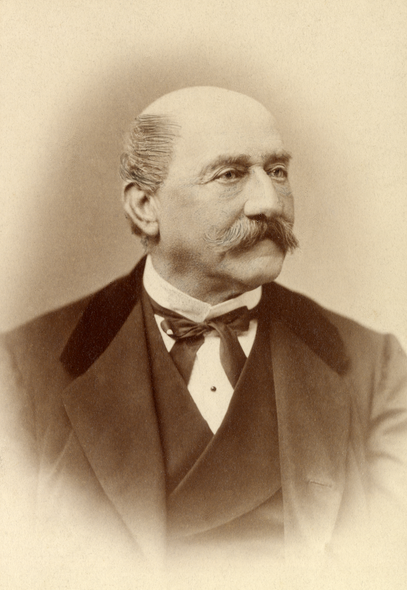

Minister of Croatian Affairs of Hungary
- In office 10 February 1871 – 25 February 1876
- Prime Minister: Gyula Andrássy; József Szlávy; István Bittó; Béla Wenckheim; Kálmán Tisza
- Preceded by: Koloman Bedeković
- Succeeded by: Koloman Bedeković

Personal details
- Born: 20 February 1804 Pozsony, Kingdom of Hungary (modern Slovakia)
- Died: 15 April 1887 (aged 83) Vienna, Austria-Hungary
- Party: Independent
- Profession: politician

Count Petar Pejačević of Virovitica (Croatian: grof Petar Pejačević Virovitički, Hungarian: verőczei gróf Péter Pejacsevich; 20 February 1804 – 15 April 1887) was a Croatian politician, who served as Hungarian Minister without portfolio of Croatian Affairs between 1871 and 1876. He was a member of the Ruma-Retfala branch of the Pejačević noble family.

Pejačević studied law in the Theresianum in Vienna. In 1845 he was appointed prefect (župan) of Bjelovar-Križevci County. During the Hungarian Revolution of 1848 he didn't support the Croatians' independence war and didn't take part in the Sabor's work, which stood by Josip Jelačić.

When Koloman Bedeković became Ban of Croatia, Pejačević was appointed Minister of Croatian Affairs. After that he retired from the politics. His relatives from the Našice branch of the family, count Ladislav Pejačević between 1880 and 1883, and Teodor Pejačević between 1903 and 1907, served as Bans (viceroys) of Croatia. Teodor was also Minister of Croatian Affairs later.

Political offices
Preceded by Koloman Bedeković	Minister of Croatian Affairs; 1871–1876	Succeeded by Koloman Bedeković
