= Levin Rauch =

Ban of Croatia from 1867 to 1871

Levin Rauch de Nyék
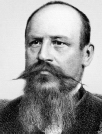

Ban of Croatia-Slavonia
- In office 8 December 1868 (acting from 1867) – 26 January 1871
- Preceded by: Josip Šokčević
- Succeeded by: Koloman Bedeković

Personal details
- Born: 6 October 1819 Lužnica, Croatia, Austrian Empire (now Zaprešić, Croatia)
- Died: 25 August 1890 (aged 70) Lužnica, Croatia-Slavonia, Austria-Hungary (now Zaprešić, Croatia)
- Spouse: Antonia Gräfin Sermage de Medvegrád et Szomszédvár

Baron Levin Rauch de Nyék (Hungarian: báró nyéki Rauch Levin; 6 October 1819 – 25 August 1890) was an Austro-Hungarian politician who was Ban of Croatia-Slavonia from 1867 to 1871. He is most notable for securing victory for the Unionist Party through changing the election law and terrorising those who were able to vote.

== Life ==
His father was Dániel Freiherr Rauch de Nyék (1778–1831), while his mother was Erzsébet Farkas de Nagyjóka (1787–1858). His grandfather was Pál Freiherr Rauch de Nyék (c.1739–1815), a colonel who received the title of Freiherr from Queen Maria Theresa. His paternal grandmother was Anna Szegedy de Mezőszeged.

Rauch was a member of the Unionist Party, a party in 19th-century Croatia-Slavonia that advocated for an unconditional union between Croatia and the Kingdom of Hungary. After the Revolutions of 1848, Croatia became a Habsburg crown territory separate from Hungary, but when the Austro-Hungarian Compromise of 1867 was signed, Austria-Hungary was created and Rauch was appointed as the acting ban (or viceroy) of Croatia on 27 June 1867. During this time a new Croatian–Hungarian Settlement was negotiated and put in effect through which Croatia reinstated some of its earlier autonomy, but also lost some other rights. Rauch was made the permanent ban on 8 December 1868 and remained in office until 26 January 1871.

== Bibliography ==
- Sirotković, Hodimir; Margetić, Lujo (1988). Povijest država i prava naroda SFR Jugoslavije (in Croatian). Školska knjiga. ISBN 9788603991802.
