= Kingdom of Croatia-Slavonia =

Austro-Hungarian region (1868–1918)

Coordinates: 45°48′N 15°58′E

Triune Kingdom of Croatia, Slavonia and Dalmatia
Trojedna Kraljevina Hrvatska, Slavonija i Dalmacija (Croatian)
In other languages
- - Hungarian: Horvát–Szlavón Királyság
  - German: Königreich Kroatien, Slawonien und Dalmatien
  - Serbian: Троједна Краљевина Хрватске, Славоније и Далмације
- 1868–1918
- Flag (Note: The flag with the coat of arms was used internally for usage in autonomic affairs and was officially prescribed to depict the Hungarian Crown of St. Stephen above the shield, but an unofficial design using another type of crown was most often used instead. The same flag without the coat of arms was used as a Civil Flag.) Coat of arms
- Anthem: Carevka Lijepa naša domovino (unofficial) ("Our Beautiful Homeland")
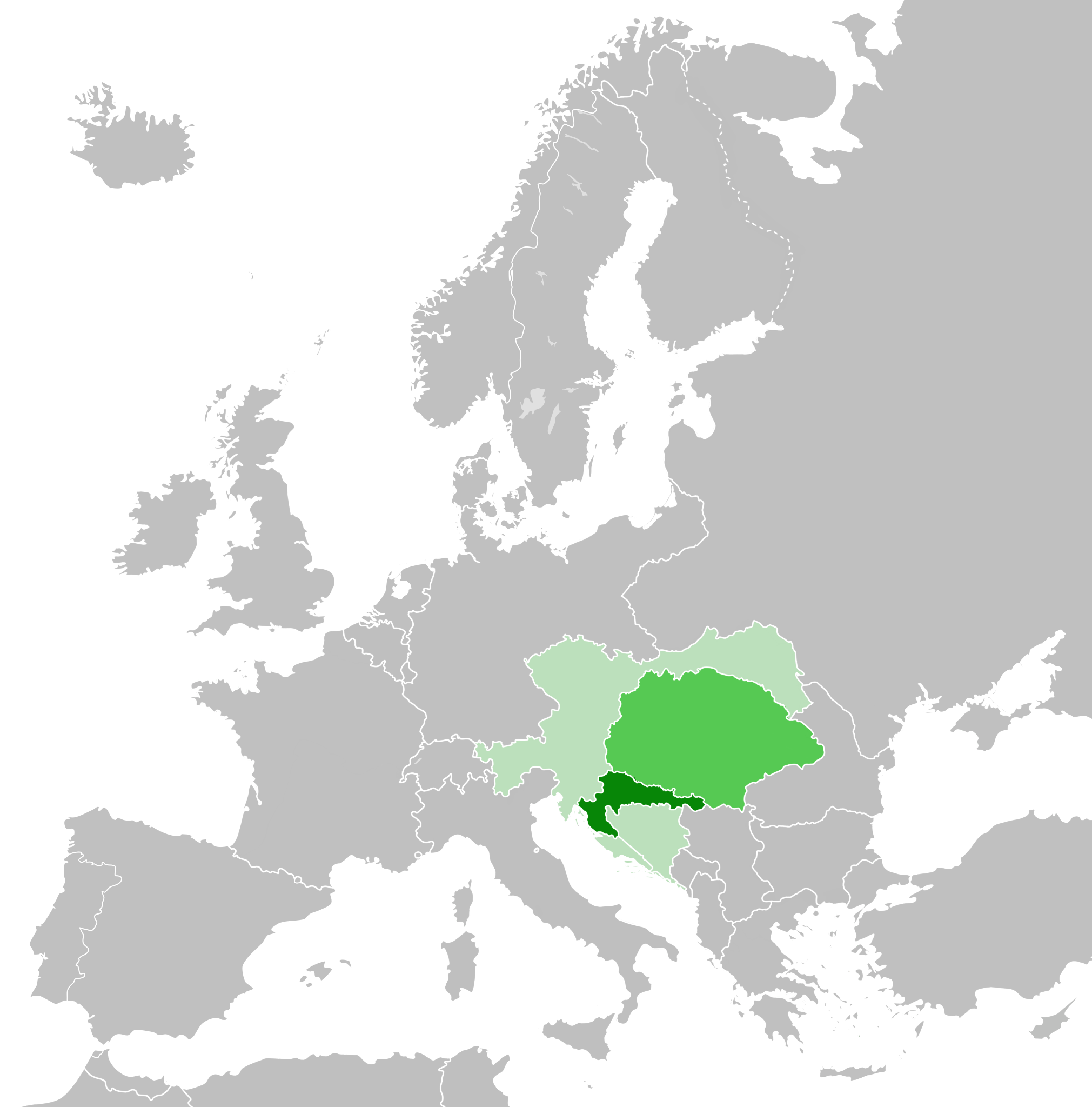
- Croatia-Slavonia Within the Lands of the Crown of Saint Stephen Within Austria-Hungary
- Status: Constituent kingdom within Austria-Hungary (part of the Lands of the Crown of St Stephen)
- Capital: Zagreb
- Official languages: Croatian
- Religion: Catholic
- Government: Constitutional parliamentary monarchy
- King
  - 1868–1916: Franz Joseph I
  - 1916–1918: Karl IV
- Ban
  - 1868–1871 (first): Levin Rauch de Nyék
  - 1917–1918 (last): Antun Mihalović
- Legislature: Sabor
- Historical era: New Imperialism • World War I
  - 1868 Settlement: 26 September 1868
  - Incorporation of parts of the Military Frontier: 15 July 1881
  - Independence: 29 October 1918

Area
- 1910: 42,541 km^{2} (16,425 sq mi)

Population
  - 1880: 1,892,499
  - 1910: 2,621,954
- Currency: Florin (1868–1892); Crown (1892–1918)
Preceded by	Succeeded by
Kingdom of Croatia; Kingdom of Slavonia	State of Slovenes, Croats and Serbs
- Today part of: Croatia; Serbia

The Kingdom of Croatia-Slavonia or the Triune Kingdom of Croatia, Slavonia and Dalmatia (Croatian: Trojedna Kraljevina Hrvatska, Slavonija i Dalmacija; Hungarian: Horvát-Szlavónország or Horvát–Szlavón Királyság; German: Königreich Kroatien, Slawonien und Dalmatien) was a nominally autonomous kingdom and constitutionally defined separate political nation within the Austro-Hungarian Empire. It was created in 1868 by merging the kingdoms of Croatia and Slavonia following the Croatian–Hungarian Settlement of 1868. It was associated with the Kingdom of Hungary within the dual Austro-Hungarian state, being within the Lands of the Crown of St. Stephen, also known as Transleithania. While Croatia had been granted a wide internal autonomy with "national features", in reality, Croatian control over key issues such as tax and military issues was minimal and hampered by Hungary. It was officially referred to as the Triune Kingdom of Croatia, Slavonia and Dalmatia, also simply known as the Triune Kingdom, and had claims on Kingdom of Dalmatia, which was administered separately by the Austrian Cisleithania. The city of Rijeka, following a disputed section in the 1868 Settlement known as the Rijeka Addendum, became a corpus separatum and was legally owned by Hungary, but administered by both Croatia and Hungary.

The Kingdom of Croatia-Slavonia was ruled by the emperor of Austria, who bore the title King of Croatia, Slavonia and Dalmatia and was confirmed by the State Sabor (Parliament of Croatia-Slavonia or Croatian-Slavonian Diet) upon accession. The King's appointed steward was the Ban of Croatia and Slavonia. On 21 October 1918, Emperor Karl I, known as King Karlo IV in Croatia, issued a Trialist manifest, which was ratified by the Hungarian side on the next day and which unified all Croatian Crown Lands. One week later, on 29 October 1918, the Croatian State Sabor proclaimed an independent kingdom which entered the State of Slovenes, Croats and Serbs.

== Name ==
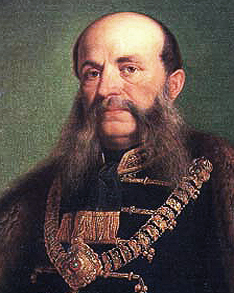
Ivan Mažuranić, Ban (viceroy) of the Triune Kingdom of Croatia (in office 1873–1880)

The kingdom used the formal title of the Triune Kingdom of Croatia, Slavonia, and Dalmatia, thereby pressing its claim on the Kingdom of Dalmatia. But Dalmatia was a Kronland within the imperial Austrian part of Austria-Hungary (also known as Cisleithania). The claim was, for most of the time, supported by the Hungarian government, which backed Croatia–Slavonia in an effort to increase its share of the dual state. The union between the two primarily Croatian lands of Austria-Hungary never took place, however. According to the Article 53 of the Croatian–Hungarian Agreement, governing Croatia's political status in the Hungarian-ruled part of Austria-Hungary, the ban's official title was "Ban of Kingdom of Dalmatia, Croatia and Slavonia". Not only would different parts of the Monarchy at the same time use different styles of the titles, but even the same institutions would at the same time use different naming standards for the same institution. For instance, when the Imperial and Royal Court in Vienna would list the Croatian Ban as one of the Great Officers of State in the Kingdom of Hungary (Barones Regni), the style used would be Regnorum Croatiae, Dalmatiae et Slavoniae Banus, but when the Court would list the highest officials of the Kingdom of Croatia and Slavonia, the title would be styled as "Ban of Croatia, Slavonia and Dalmatia" (putting Slavonia before Dalmatia and omitting "Kingdom"). The laws passed in Croatia–Slavonia used the phrase "Kingdom of Dalmatia, Croatia and Slavonia".

In Hungarian, Croatia is referred to as Horvátország and Slavonia as Szlavónia. The combined polity was known by the official name of Horvát-Szlavón Királyság. The short form of the name was Horvát-Szlavónország and, less frequently Horvát-Tótország.

The order of mentioning Dalmatia was a contentious issue, as it was ordered differently in the Croatian- and Hungarian-language versions of the 1868 Settlement.

== History ==
The Kingdom of Croatia-Slavonia was created in 1868, when the former kingdoms of Croatia and Slavonia were joined into one single kingdom (the full civil administration was introduced in the Kingdom of Slavonia in 1745 and it was, as one of the Lands of the Crown of St. Stephen, administratively included into both the Kingdom of Croatia and Kingdom of Hungary, but it existed virtually until 1868). The Croatian parliament, elected in a questionable manner, confirmed the subordination of Croatia–Slavonia to Hungary in 1868 with signing of Hungarian–Croatian union constitution called the Nagodba (Croatian–Hungarian Settlement, known also as Croatian–Hungarian Agreement or Hungarian–Croatian Compromise of 1868). This kingdom included parts of present-day Croatia and Serbia (eastern part of Syrmia).

After the Austro-Hungarian Compromise of 1867 the only remaining open question of the new state was the status of Croatia, which would be solved with the Hungarian–Croatian Compromise of Croatia-Hungarian compromise of 1868 when agreement was reached between the Diet of Hungary on one hand and the Croatian Parliament on the other hand, with regard to the composition by a joint enactment of the constitutional questions at issue between them. Settlement reached between Hungary and Croatia was in Croatian version of the Settlement named "The Settlement between Kingdom of Hungary, united with Erdély on the one side and the Kingdoms of Dalmatia, Croatia and Slavonia". In the Hungarian version neither Hungary, nor Croatia, Dalmatia and Slavonia are styled kingdoms, and Erdély is not even mentioned, while the Settlement is named as the Settlement between Parliament of Hungary and Parliament of Croatia, Slavonia and Dalmatia. Both versions received Royal sanction and both as such became fundamental laws of the state with constitutional importance, pursuant to article 69. and 70. of the Settlement.

With this compromise the parliament of personal union (in which Croatia–Slavonia had only twenty-nine, after 1881 – forty deputies) controlled the military, the financial system, Sea (Maritime) Law, Commercial Law, the law of Bills of Exchange and Mining Law, and generally matters of commerce, customs, telegraphs, Post Office, railways, harbours, shipping, and those roads and rivers which jointly concern Hungary and Croatia–Slavonia.

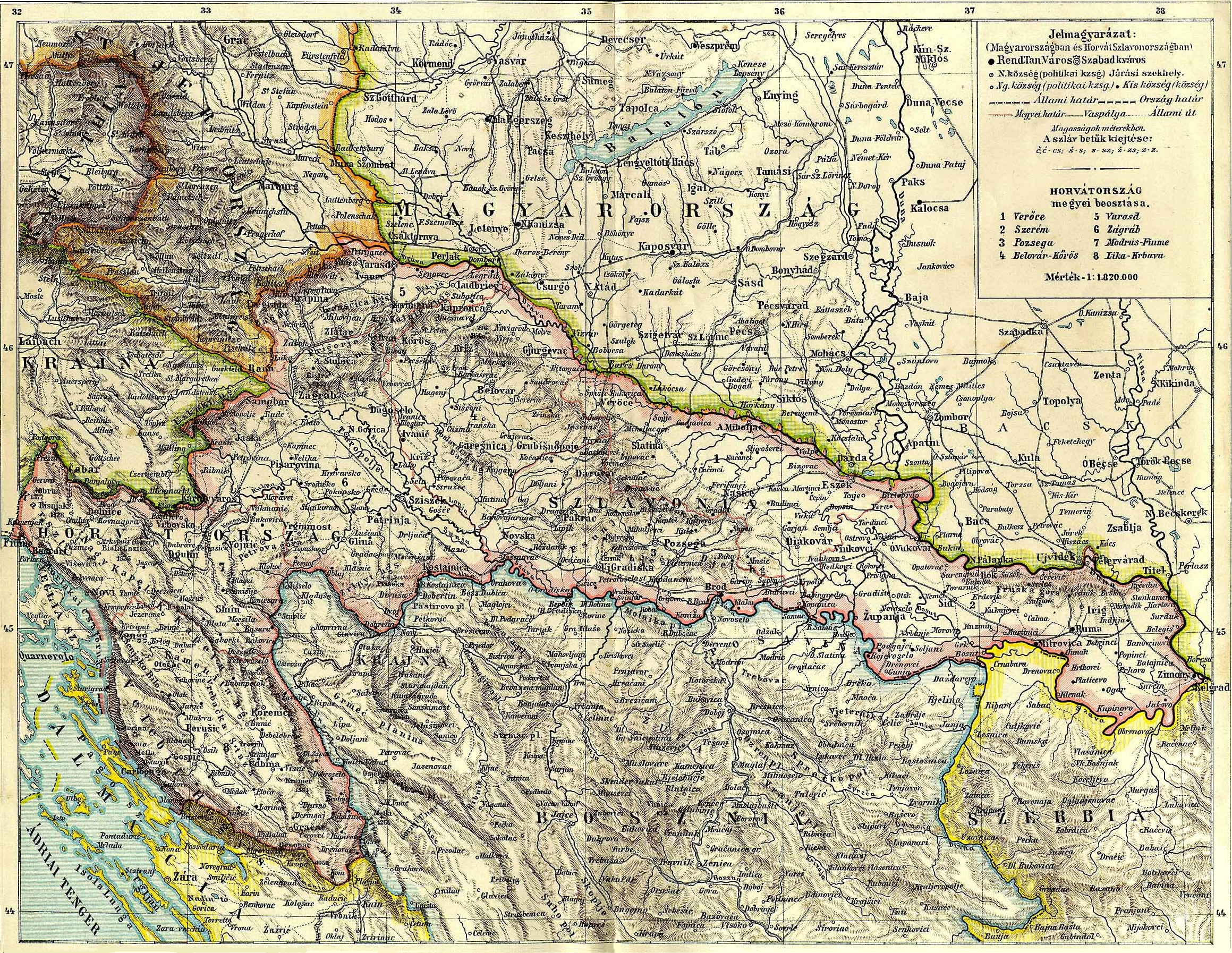
Map of Kingdom of Croatia-Slavonia in Austria-Hungary (1867–1918).

Similarly to these affairs, trade matters including hawking, likewise with regard to societies which do not exist for public gain, and also with regard to passports, frontier police, citizenship and naturalization, the legislation was joint, but the executive in respect of these affairs was reserved to Kingdom of Croatia–Slavonia. The citizenship was named "Hungarian–Croatian citizenship" in Croatia–Slavonia. In the end, fifty-five per cent of the total income of Croatia–Slavonia were assigned to the Joint Treasury ("Joint Hungarian–Croatian Ministry of Finance").

The kingdom existed until 1918 when it joined the newly formed State of Slovenes, Croats and Serbs, which together with the Kingdom of Serbia formed the Kingdom of Serbs, Croats and Slovenes. The new Serb–Croat–Slovene Kingdom was divided into counties between 1918 and 1922 and into oblasts between 1922 and 1929. With the formation of the Kingdom of Yugoslavia in 1929, most of the territory of the former Kingdom of Croatia–Slavonia became a part of the Sava Banate and in 1939 autonomous Banovina of Croatia.

== Government and politics ==
=== Political status ===
Austria-Hungary
Lands of the Austrian Imperial Council	Lands of the Crown of Saint Stephen
Kingdom of Hungary	Kingdom of Croatia–Slavonia

← common emperor-king, common ministries

← entities

← partner states

The Austro-Hungarian Compromise of 1867 (Ausgleich) created the Dual Monarchy. Under the Compromise, Austria and Hungary each had separate parliaments (the Imperial Council and the Diet of Hungary) that passed and maintained separate laws. Each region had its own government, headed by its own prime minister. The "common monarchy" consisted of the emperor-king and the common ministers of foreign affairs, defense and finance in Vienna. The Compromise confirmed Croatia–Slavonia's historic, eight-centuries-old relationship with Hungary and perpetuated the division of the Croat lands, for both Dalmatia and Istria remained under Austrian administration (as Kingdom of Dalmatia and Margraviate of Istria).

At Franz Joseph's insistence, Hungary and Croatia reached the Compromise (or Nagodba in Croatian) in 1868, giving the Croats a special status in Hungary. The agreement granted the Croats autonomy over their internal affairs. The Croatian Ban would now be nominated by the joint Croatian–Hungarian government led by the Hungarian Prime Minister, and appointed by the king. Areas of "common" concern to Hungarians and Croats included finance, currency matters, commercial policy, the post office, and the railroad. Croatian became the official language of Croatia's government, and Croatian representatives discussing "common" affairs before the Croatian–Hungarian diet were permitted to speak Croatian. A ministry of Croatian Affairs was created within the Hungarian government.

Although the Nagodba provided a measure of political autonomy to Croatia–Slavonia, it was subordinated politically and economically to Hungary in the Croatian–Hungarian entity of the Monarchy.

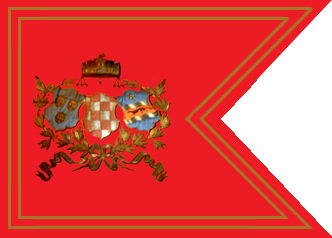
Royal Bans Standard of Levin Rauch, the first Ban of Croatia–Slavonia (1868–1871)

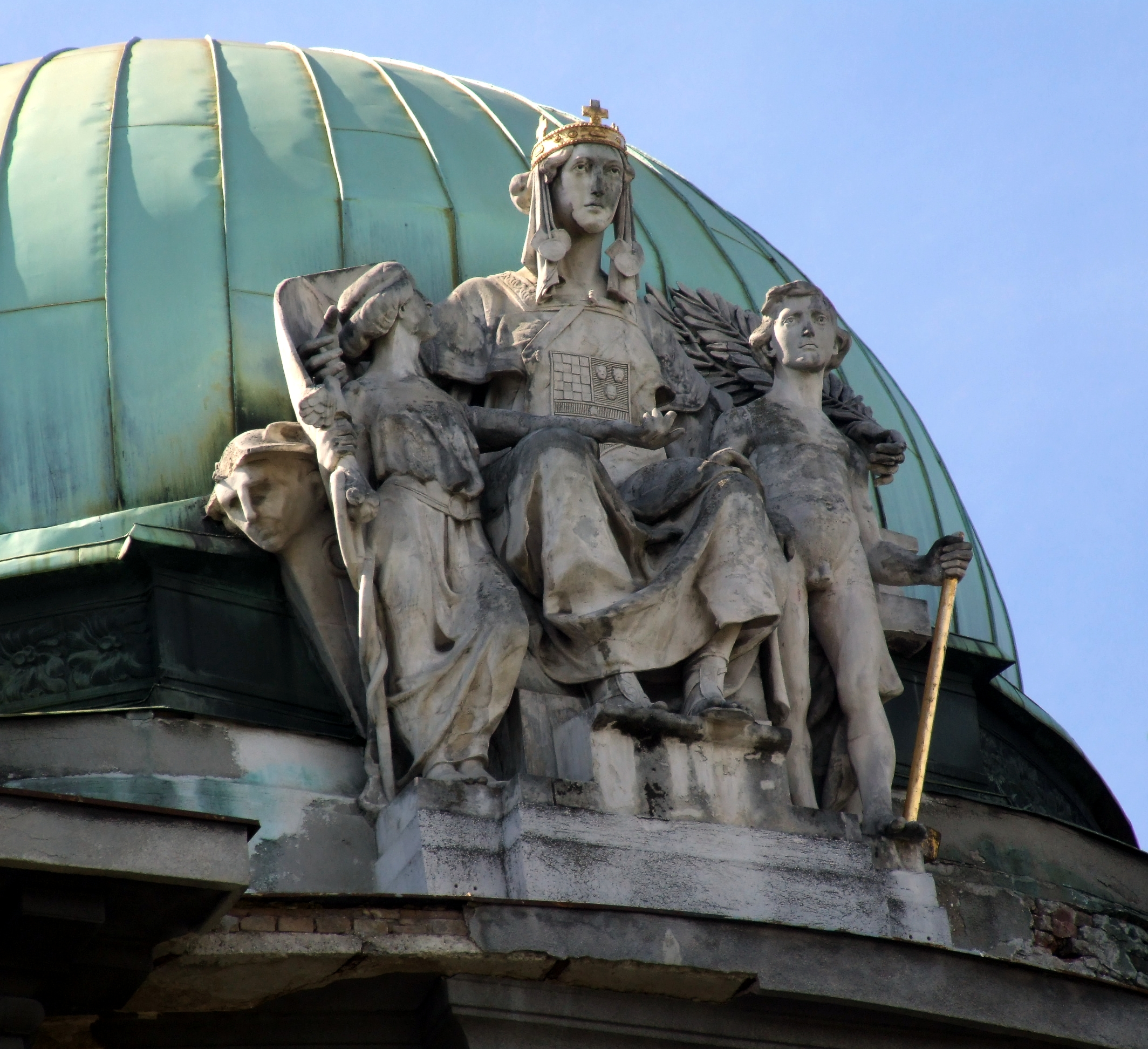
Sculpture symbolizing the Triune Kingdom of Croatia, Zagreb

=== Parliament ===
The Croatian Diet (i.e. parliament) or the Royal Croatian-Slavonian-Dalmatian Sabor (Croatian: Kraljevski Hrvatsko–slavonsko–dalmatinski sabor or Sabor Kraljevina Hrvatske, Slavonije i Dalmacije), had legislative authority over the autonomous issues according to the Croatian–Hungarian Settlement of 1868. A draft law (bill), approved by the parliament, became a statute (an act) after the royal assent (sanction). It also had to be signed by the ban of Croatia. The king had the power to veto all legislation passed by the parliament and also to dissolve it and call new elections. If the king dissolved the parliament, he would have to call new elections within three months.

The parliament was summoned annually at Zagreb by the king or by the king's especially appointed commissioner (usually the ban). It was unicameral, but alongside 88 elected deputies (in 1888), 44 ex officio members were Croatian and Slavonian high nobility (male princes, counts and barons – similar to hereditary peers – over the age of 24 who paid at least 1,000 florins a year land tax), high dignitaries of the Roman Catholic, Greek Catholic and Eastern Orthodox churches, and the supreme county prefects (veliki župani) of all Croatian-Slavonian counties. The legislative term was three years, and after 1887, five years.

The Croatian Parliament elected 29 deputies (40 after the reincorporation of Croatian Military Frontier and Slavonian Military Frontier in 1881) to the House of Representatives and two members (three from 1881) to the House of Magnates of the Diet of Hungary. The delegates of Croatia-Slavonia were allowed to use Croatian in the proceedings, and they voted as individuals.

The Kingdom of Croatia–Slavonia held independent elections for the Croatian Parliament in 1865, 1867, 1871, 1872, 1878, 1881, 1883, 1884, 1887, 1892, 1897, 1901, 1906, 1908, 1910, 1911 and 1913.

Main political parties represented in the parliament included the People's Party (People's Liberal Party), the Independent People's Party (after 1880), the Croatian-Hungarian Party (People's [National] Constitutional Party or Unionist Party; 1868–1873), the Party of Rights, the Pure Party of Rights (after 1895), Starčević's Party of Rights (after 1908), the Serb Independent Party (after 1881), the Croatian Peoples' Peasant Party (after 1904) and the Croat-Serb Coalition (after 1905), as well as others.

=== Autonomous Government ===
The Autonomous Government or Land Government, officially "Royal Croatian–Slavonian–Dalmatian Land Government"(Croatian: Zemaljska vlada or Kraljevska hrvatsko–slavonsko–dalmatinska zemaljska vlada) was established in 1869 with its seat in Zagreb (Croatian Parliament Act No. II of 1869). Until 1914 it possessed three departments:

- Department of Internal Affairs (Croatian: Odjel za unutarnje poslove);
- Department of Religion and Education (Croatian: Odjel za bogoštovlje i nastavu);
- Department of Justice (Croatian: Odjel za pravosuđe).
- The Department of National Economy was established in 1914 as a fourth department (Croatian: Odjel za narodno gospodarstvo)

At the head of the Autonomous Government in Croatia–Slavonia stood the Ban, who was responsible to the Croatian–Slavonian Diet.

=== Ban (Prime Minister and Viceroy) ===
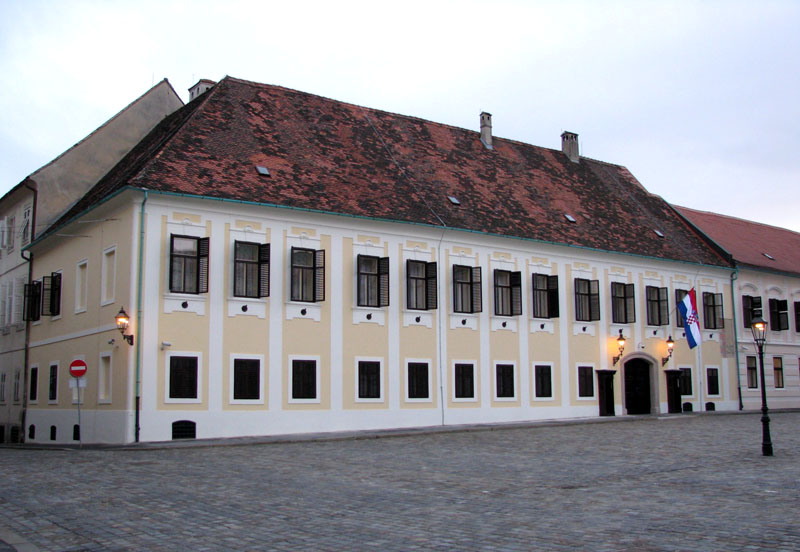
Banski dvori (Ban's Court), the palace of the Ban of Croatia, in Zagreb, today the seat of the Croatian Government

The Ban was appointed by the King, on the proposal and under the counter-signature of the Joint Hungarian minister-president.

List of bans (viceroys) from 1868 until 1918:

- 1868 – 1871: Baron Levin Rauch de Nyék
- 1871 – 1872: Koloman pl. Bedeković de Komor
- 1872 – 1873: Antun pl. Vukanović acting
- 1873 – 1880: Ivan Mažuranić
- 1880 – 1883: Count Ladislav Pejačević de Virovitica
- 1883: Herman pl. Ramberg acting
- 1883 – 1903: Count Károly Khuen-Héderváry de Hédervár
- 1903 – 1907: Count Teodor Pejačević de Virovitica
- 1907 – 1908: Aleksandar pl. Rakodczay
- 1908 – 1910: Baron Pavao Rauch de Nyék
- 1910 – 1912: Nikola pl. Tomašić
- 1912 – 1913: Baron Slavko Cuvaj de Ivanska
- 1913 – 1917: Baron Ivan Skerlecz de Lomnica
- 1917 – 1918: Antun pl. Mihalović

== Law ==
The supreme court of the Kingdom of Croatia and Slavonia was the Table of Seven in Zagreb ("Table of Septemvirs" or "Court of Seven"; Croatian: Stol sedmorice, Latin: Tabula Septemviralis), while the second-level court (court of appeal) was the Ban's Table or Ban's Court (Croatian: Banski stol, Latin: Tabula Banalis) in Zagreb.

After the judicial reorganization of 1874 – 1886 (complete separation of judicial and administrative power, laws on judges' independence and judicial organization, the Organization of Courts of the First Instance Act of 1874 (with 1886 amendments), the Judicial Power Act of 1874 and the Judges' Disciplinary Responsibility (etc.) Act of 1874, the Croatian Criminal Procedure Act of 1875, the Croatian Criminal Procedure Press Offences Act of 1875) and reincorporation of Croatian Military Frontier and Slavonian Military Frontier in 1881; courts of first instance became 9 royal court tables with collegiate judgeships (Croatian: kraljevski sudbeni stolovi in Zagreb, Varaždin, Bjelovar, Petrinja, Gospić, Ogulin, Požega, Osijek and Mitrovica; criminal and major civil jurisdiction; all of which had been former county courts and Land Court/Royal County Court Table in Zagreb), approximately 63 royal district courts with single judges (Croatian: kraljevski kotarski sudovi; mainly civil and misdemeanor jurisdiction; former district administrative and judicial offices and city courts) and local courts (Croatian: mjesni sudovi), also with single judges, which were established in each municipality and city according to the Local Courts and Local Courts Procedure Act of 1875 as special tribunals for minor civil cases. The Royal Court Table in Zagreb was also a jury court for press offences. Judges were appointed by the king, but their independence was legally guaranteed.

== Counties ==
Counties of Croatia-Slavonia within Austria-Hungary

In 1886, under Croatian ban Dragutin Khuen-Héderváry, Croatia–Slavonia was divided into eight counties (županije, known as comitatus):

1. Modruš-Rijeka County
2. Zagreb County
3. Varaždin County
4. Bjelovar-Križevci County
5. Virovitica County
6. Požega County
7. Srijem County
8. Lika-Krbava County

Lika-Krbava became a county after the incorporation of the Croatian Military Frontier into Croatia–Slavonia in 1881. The counties were subsequently divided into a total of 77 districts (Croatian: kotari, similar to Austrian Bezirke) as governmental units. Cities (gradovi) and municipalities (općine) were local authorities.

== Symbols ==
=== Flag ===
Left: The flag with the coat of arms used internally "for autonomic affairs" by decree of the viceroy. It was officially prescribed to be crowned with the Crown of St. Stephen, but often used an alternate design, as depicted here.
Center: The official, but less common, flag with the coat of arms, topped with the crown of St. Stephen Right: The flag without the coat of arms was the civil flag that was also used outside of the Kingdom.

According to the 1868 Agreement and the Decree No. 18.307 of 16 November 1867 of the Department of the Interior of the Royal Country Government:

The red–white–blue tricolor is the civil flag in the Kingdoms of Croatia and Slavonia, which with the united coat of arms of Croatia, Slavonia and Dalmatia with the crown of St. Stephen on top is the official flag for usage in autonomous affairs. The aforementioned civil flag may be used by everyone in an appropriate way.

It was also stated that the emblem for "joint affairs of the territories of the Hungarian Crown" is formed by the united coat of arms of Hungary and Dalmatia, Croatia and Slavonia.

However, there existed several variations of the internally used version of the flag, with some variants using an unofficial type of crown or simply omitting the crown instead of using the officially prescribed Hungarian Crown of St. Stephen. There were also variations in the design of the shield. The unofficial coat of arms was the preferred design and its widespread use was the reason that the Ban issued a Decree on 21 November 1914, stating that it had become "a custom in the Kingdoms of Croatia and Slavonia to use flags that are not adequate either in state-juridical or in political sense" and which strengthened flag related laws. It reiterated the aforementioned definitions of Croatian flags from 1867 and further stated that "Police authorities shall punish violations of this Decree with a fine of 2 to 200 K or with arrest from 6 hours to 14 days and confiscate the unauthorized flag or emblem."

=== Coat of arms ===
The official version had St. Stephen's crown due to Croatia–Slavonia being part of Lands of the Crown of Saint Stephen.

Version without crown

Unofficial, but more common design of the coat of arms without the St. Stephen's crown

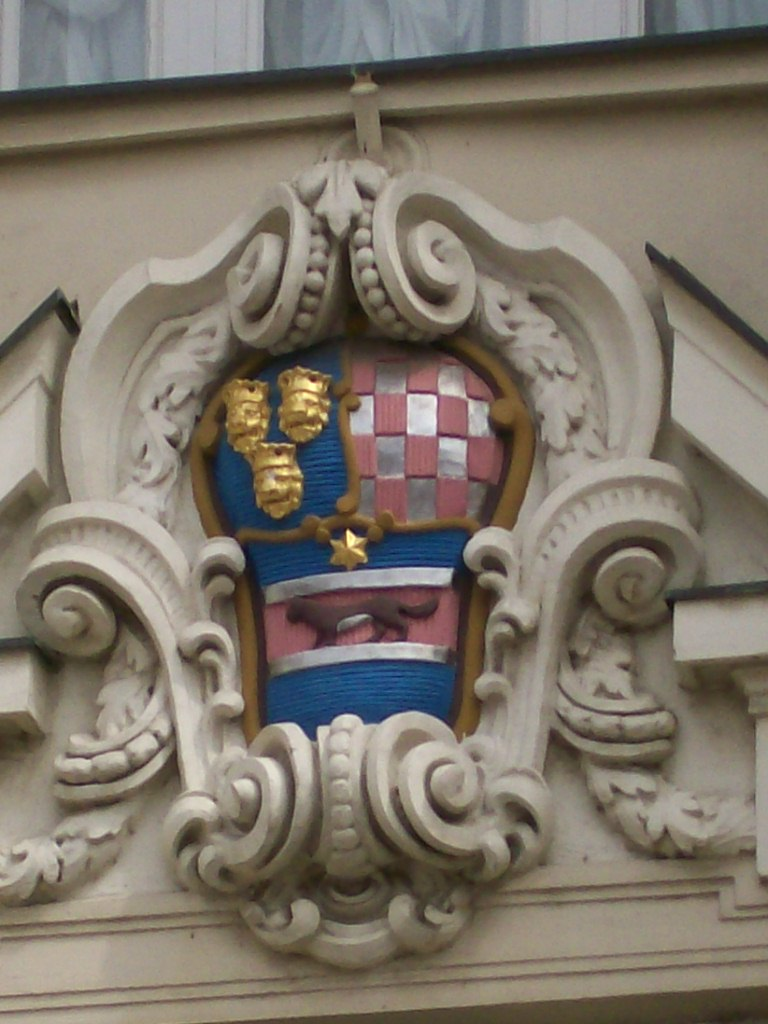
The coat of arms of the Triune Kingdom on the building of the Croatian Parliament

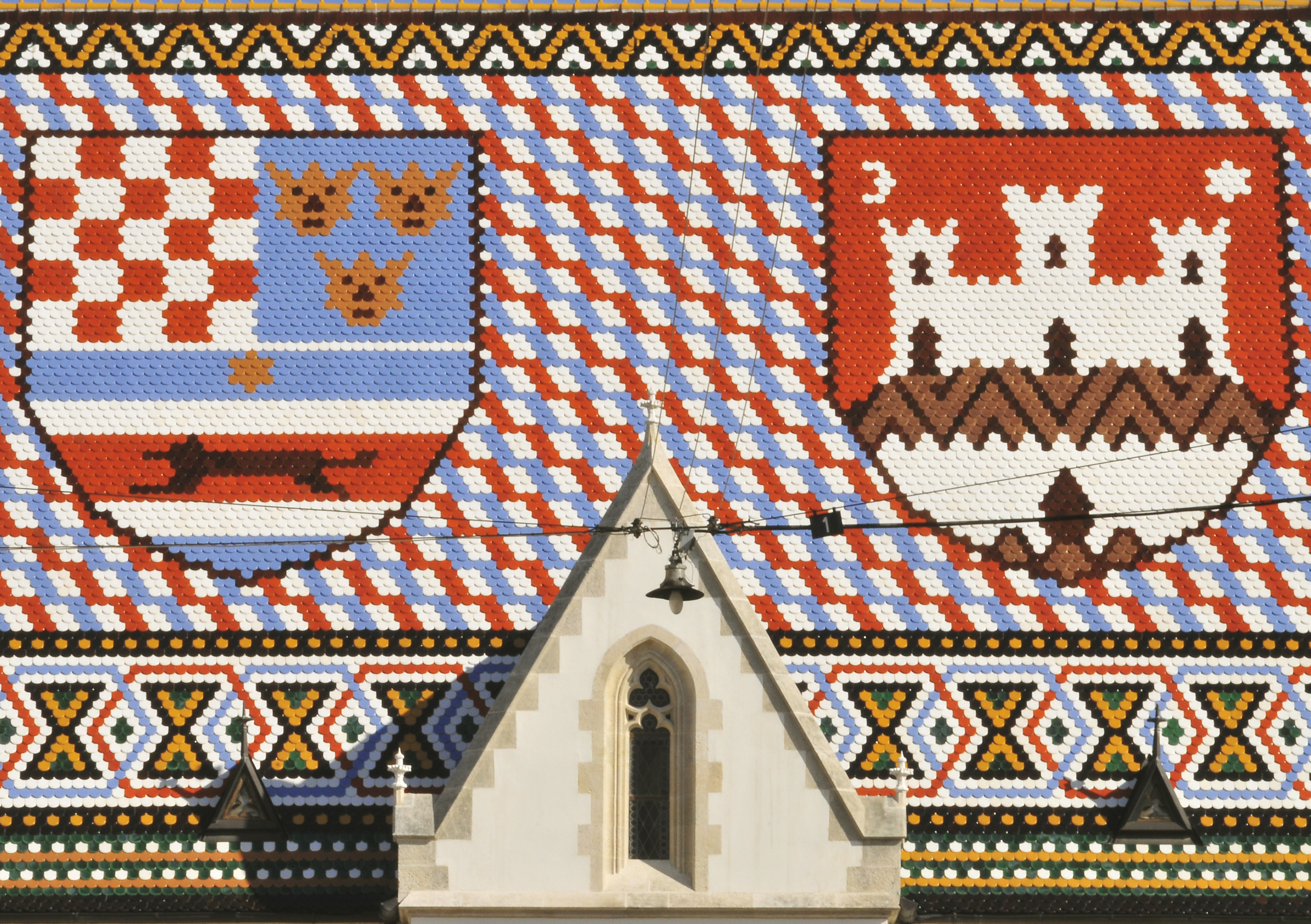
The coat of arms of the Triune Kingdom on the roof of the St. Mark's Church, Zagreb

== Demographics ==
=== Nationality ===
1910 National Census of Croatia-Slavonia
Nationality	Population	Percentage
Total	2,621,954	100.0%
Croats	1,638,354	62.5%
Serbs	644,955	24.6%
Germans	134,078	5.0%
Hungarians	105,948	4.1%
Others	98,619	3.8%

- 1875 data (without the Military Frontier)
  - Croats and Serbs 1,032,000
  - Germans 31,700
  - Hungarians 12,000
  - Czechs and Slovaks 5,000
  - Italians 2,000
  - Slovenians 2,000
  - Others 2,000

=== Religion ===
Data taken from the 1910 census.

- Roman Catholic: 1,877,833
- Eastern Orthodox: 653,184
- Protestant: 51,707
- Uniate: 17,592

=== Literacy ===
According to the 1910 census, illiteracy rate in Kingdom of Croatia–Slavonia was 45.9%. The lowest illiteracy was in Zagreb, Osijek and Zemun.

Illiteracy rates of Kingdom of Croatia–Slavonia 1880–1910
Year	Total illiteracy	Males	Females	Total population
1880	73.9%	67.8%	79.9%	1,892,449
1890	66.9%	60.1%	73.5%	2,186,410
1900	54.4%	46.8%	61.8%	2,416,304
1910	45.9%	37.6%	53.7%	2,621,954

== Military ==
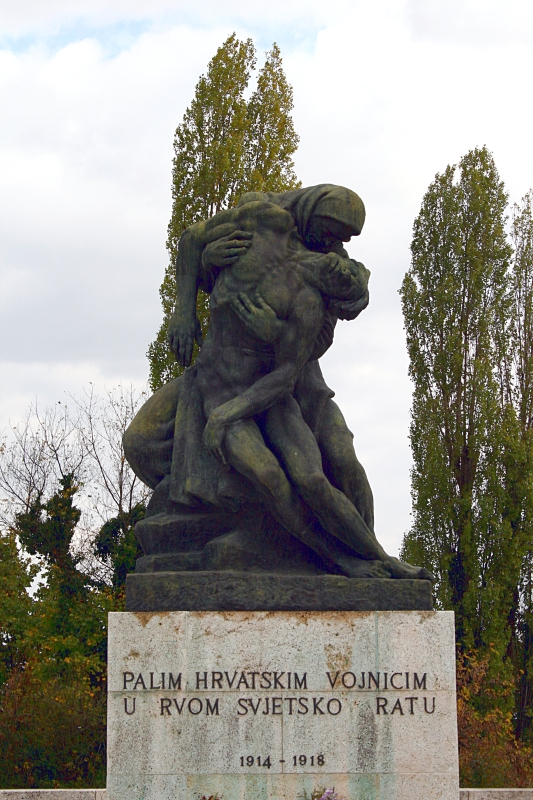
Memorial to Croatian soldiers who fought in World War I

The Royal Croatian Home Guard was the military of the Kingdom. Additionally, Croats made up 5 percent of members in the Austro-Hungarian Common Army, a higher proportion than the percentage of the general population of the empire they composed. Notable Croatians in the Austro-Hungarian Army included Field Marshal Svetozar Boroević, commander of the Imperial and Royal Aviation Troops Emil Uzelac, commander of the Austro-Hungarian Navy Maximilian Njegovan and Josip Broz Tito who later became Marshal and President of the Socialist Federal Republic of Yugoslavia.

== Culture ==
The modern University of Zagreb was founded in 1874. The Yugoslav Academy of Sciences and Arts and Matica hrvatska were the main cultural institutions in the kingdom. In 1911 the main cultural institution in the Kingdom of Dalmatia, Matica dalmatinska, merged with Matica hrvatska. Vijenac was one of the most important cultural magazines in the kingdom. The building of the Croatian National Theatre in Zagreb was opened in 1895. The Croatian National Theatre in Osijek was established in 1907. The Sisters of Charity Hospital in Zagreb was the first established in the kingdom.

== Religion ==
=== Catholic Church ===
Roughly 75% of the population were Roman Catholic, with the remaining 25% Orthodox. The Catholic Church had the following hierarchy within the kingdom:

Dioceses	Croatian name	Est.	Cathedral
Archdiocese of Zagreb	Zagrebačka nadbiskupija	1093	Zagreb Cathedral
Eparchy of Križevci (Greek-Catholic)	Križevačka biskupija (Križevačka eparhija)	1777	Cathedral of the Holy Trinity in Križevci
Diocese of Srijem	Srijemska biskupija	4th century	Cathedral of St. Peter and St. Paul in Đakovo
Diocese of Senj-Modruš	Senjsko-modruška biskupija	1168	Cathedral of the Assumption of the Blessed Virgin Mary in Senj

=== Judaism ===
In 1890, there were 17,261 Jews living in the kingdom. In 1867 the Zagreb Synagogue was built.

== Transportation ==
The first railway line opened in the kingdom was the Zidani Most–Zagreb–Sisak route which began operations in 1862. The Zaprešić–Varaždin–Čakovec line was opened in 1886 and the Vinkovci–Osijek line was opened in 1910.

== Sports ==
The Croatian Sports Association was formed in 1909 with Franjo Bučar as its president. While Austria-Hungary had competed in the modern Olympics since the inaugural games in 1896, the Austrian Olympic Committee and Hungarian Olympic Committee held the exclusive right to send their athletes to the games. The association organized a national football league in 1912.

== Legacy ==
In 1918, during the last days of World War I, the Croatian parliament abolished the Hungarian–Croatian personal union, and both parts of the Kingdom of Croatia and Slavonia and the Kingdom of Dalmatia (excluding Zadar and Lastovo), became part of the State of Slovenes, Croats and Serbs, which together with the Kingdom of Serbia, formed the Kingdom of Serbs, Croats and Slovenes (later known as the Kingdom of Yugoslavia). The new Serb–Croat–Slovene Kingdom was divided into counties between 1918 and 1922 and into oblasts between 1922 and 1929. With the formation of the Kingdom of Yugoslavia in 1929, most of the territory of the former Kingdom of Croatia–Slavonia became a part of the Sava Banovina, and most of the former Kingdom of Dalmatia became part of the Littoral Banovina.

On the basis of the political agreement between Dragiša Cvetković and Vlatko Maček (Cvetković-Maček Agreement) and the "Decree on the Banovina of Croatia" (Uredba o Banovini Hrvatskoj) dated 24 August 1939, the autonomous Banovina of Croatia (Banate of Croatia) was created by uniting the Sava Banovina, the Littoral Banovina, and districts Brčko, Derventa, Dubrovnik, Fojnica, Gradačac, Ilok, Šid and Travnik.
