= Ivan Mažuranić =

Croatian writer and politician (1814–1890)

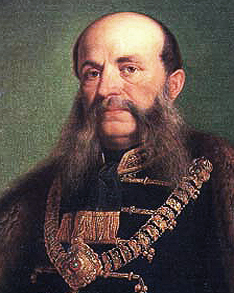
- Portrait of Ivan Mažuranić

Ban of Croatia-Slavonia
- In office 20 September 1873 – 21 February 1880
- Monarch: Franz Joseph I
- Preceded by: Antun Vakanović
- Succeeded by: Ladislav Pejačević

Personal details
- Born: 11 August 1814 Novi Vinodolski, Kingdom of Croatia, Austrian Empire (now Croatia)
- Died: 4 August 1890 (aged 75) Zagreb, Kingdom of Croatia-Slavonia, Austria-Hungary (now Croatia)
- Party: People's Party; Independent People's Party
- Spouse: Aleksandra Demeter
- Relatives: Ivana Brlić-Mažuranić (granddaughter)
- Education: University of Zagreb; University of West Hungary
- Occupation: Poet, lawyer, politician
- Known for: The Death of Smail-aga Čengić (poem)
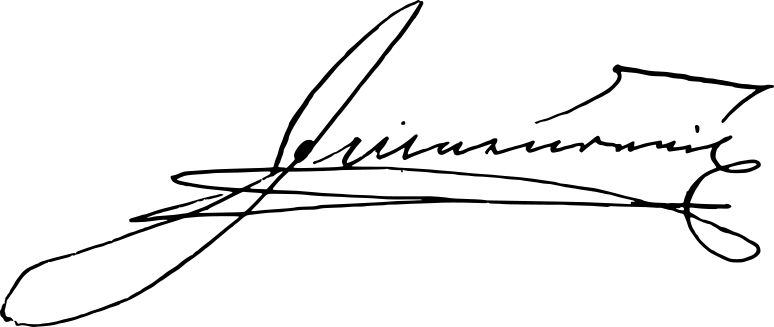
- Signature

Ivan Mažuranić (pronounced [ǐʋan maʒǔranitɕ]; 11 August 1814 – 4 August 1890) was a Croatian poet, linguist, lawyer and politician who is considered to be one of the most important figures in Croatia's political and cultural life in the mid-19th century. Mažuranić served as Ban of Kingdom of Croatia-Slavonia between 1873 and 1880, and since he was the first ban not to hail from old nobility, he was known as Ban pučanin (Ban commoner).

His realistic assessment of strengths and weaknesses of Croatia's position between the hammer of Austrian bureaucracy and the anvil of Hungarian expansionist nationalism were seen as invaluable to his country during times of significant political turmoil. Mažuranić is best remembered for his contributions in the development of the Croatian law system, economics, linguistics, and poetry.

== Life and education ==
Ivan Mažuranić was born on 11 August 1814 as the third of four sons into a well-to-do yeoman family of Ivan Mažuranić Petrov in Novi Vinodolski in northern coastal Croatia. His brother Josip was in charge of taking care of the family estate, Anton was a famous jurist and philologist, while Matija (a blacksmith by profession) was a travel writer who wrote "A Look at Bosnia" (1842) in which he described the private and public life of Ottoman Bosnia and Herzegovina. Mažuranić became a man of many abilities; he spoke 9 languages (Croatian, Latin, Italian, German, Hungarian, French, English, Czech, and Polish) and was well versed in astronomy and mathematics. He attended elementary school in Novi Vinodolski and high school in Rijeka, after which he studied law at the University of Zagreb (1835–1837) and philosophy at the University of West Hungary. After graduation he worked as a gymnasium teacher in Zagreb, and afterwards as a lawyer in Karlovac. He married Aleksandra Demeter, the sister of the renowned Croatian poet Dimitrija Demeter.

== Politics ==
Mažuranić was the first Croatian ban not to hail from old nobility, as he was born a commoner. He held the office from 20 September 1873 until 21 February 1880. He was a member of the People's Party.

He accomplished the Croatian transition from a semi-feudal legal and economic system to a modern civil society similar to those emerging in other countries in central Europe.

Mažuranić has modernized Croatia's educational system by forming a public school network and reducing the importance of denominational schools. The latter was one of the issues that led to his later resignation as ban in 1880 and a process criticized by the Catholic Church at the time, as well as by ethnic Serb politicians in the Parliament of Croatia-Slavonia. Others consider this to have been a necessary step in modernization and secularization of Croatian society.

Almost immediately after his election as Ban, Mažuranić started with the implementation of comprehensive reforms. During the period of his rule, the Sabor passed 60 laws covering the whole area of Croatian autonomous jurisdiction. The ideological foundation of his reforms were liberal, emphasizing the importance of the Constitution, individual rights, education, science and laissez faire. The main goal of his reforms was to form foundations of the organization of autonomous Croatian government and establishment of a modern and efficient political-administrative system.

== Poetry and linguistics ==
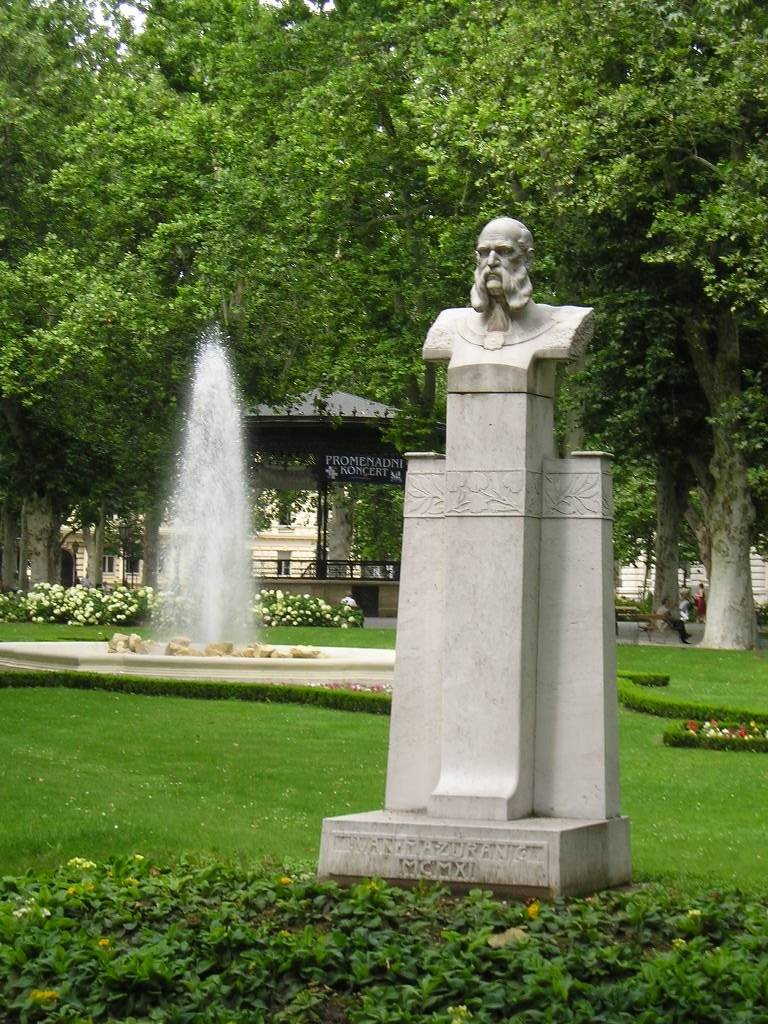
Monument to Mažuranić in Zagreb

In his native land, Mažuranić is most well-known as the poet of Smrt Smail-age Čengića (The Death of Smail-aga Čengić). This epic poem contains many verses that have become embedded in the national memory of his people, who regarded it as a "Homeric", focusing on such virtues as fortitude, fidelity, and justice.

The tale is based on an assault in Montenegro, when a petty local Muslim tyrant was killed, as an act of vendetta, in an ambush set by Montenegrins. Mažuranić's poetry transformed a rather prosaic act of tribal revenge into a hymn celebrating the struggle for freedom—acted out under the hostile forces of fatality.

Ljutit aga mrko gleda
Gdje se silom divit mora
Silan arslan gorskom mišu.

Translation:

The angry aga glumly glances
As he, the mighty lion, is forced
To admire the mountain mouse.

Following in the steps of Croatian poets like Kačić and Ivan Gundulić (his chief national influence, whose main epic Osman Mažuranić completed), Mažuranić closed the era of Romanticism and of classic epic poetry in Croatian literature.

Mažuranić's linguistic work is remarkable for its influence. He co-authored the "German-Illyrian/Croatian Dictionary" with Josip Užarević in 1842. Mažuranić had coined words that have become commonplace in standard Croatian such as words for bank accountancy, rhinoceros, sculptor, ice-cream, market economy, high treason or metropolis.

== Legacy ==
Ivan Mažuranić Square in Zagreb is named in his honor, and there are numerous streets named after him throughout Croatia. His portrait was depicted on the obverse of the Croatian 100 kuna banknote, issued in 1993 and 2002. During the Croatian accession to the European Union, Nova TV launched a campaign 'I believe in Croatia' referring to the introduction of Mažuranić's famous speech that he gave on 13 December 1886 before the Sabor; "I believe in Croatia, in its past, in its present and its future."

== See also ==
- Vienna Literary Agreement

Political offices
Preceded by Antun Vakanović	Ban of the Kingdom of Croatia-Slavonia; 1873–1880	Succeeded by Ladislav Pejačević
Cultural offices
Preceded by Ambroz Vranyczany	President of Matica hrvatska 1858–1872	Succeeded by Matija Mesić
