= Kingdom of Slavonia =

Habsburg kingdom (1699–1868)

Kingdom of Slavonia Kraljevina Slavonija (Croatian) Regnum Sclavoniae (Latin) Szlavón Királyság (Hungarian) Königreich Slawonien (German) Краљевина Славонија (Serbian)
- 1699–1868
- Flags; Top: (c. 1800–1852; 1860–1918); Bottom: (1852–1860) Coat of arms

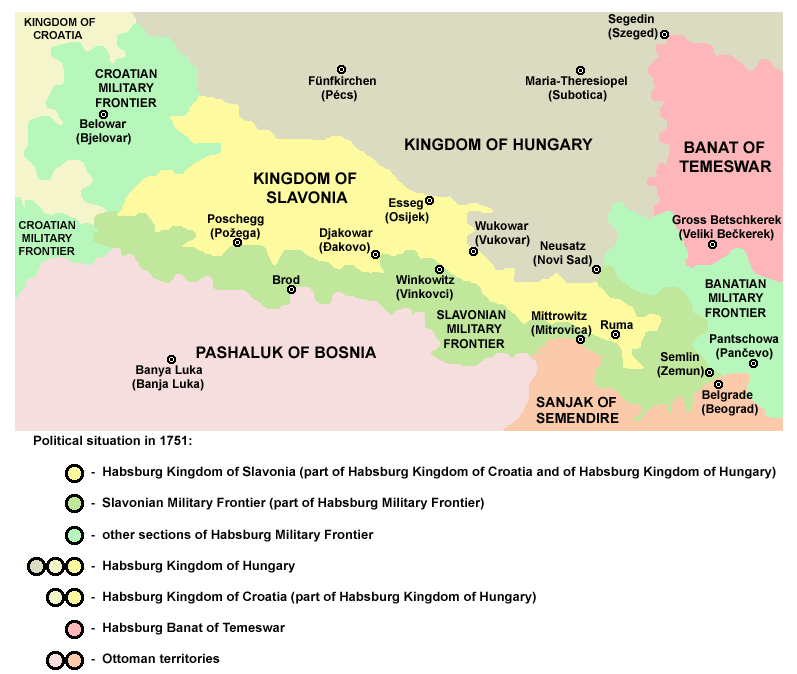
- Kingdom of Slavonia in 1751, shown in yellow
- Status: Lands of the Hungarian Crown (1102–1868)^{a} Separate Habsburg land under joint civil-military administration (1699–1745), Constituent land of the Austrian Empire (1804–1868)^{a} Lands of the Crown of Saint Stephen (1868-1918)
- Capital: Osijek; 45°33′37″N 18°40′13″E
- Common languages: Official: Latin (until 1784; 1790–1847); German (1784–1790); Croatian (1847–1868)
- Religion: Christianity
- Demonym: Slavonian
- Government: Monarchy
- Ban (Viceroy)
  - 1699–1703: Adam Batthyány (first)
  - 1867–1868: Levin Rauch (last)
- Legislature: Sabor
- Historical era: Early modern period
  - Treaty of Karlowitz: 26 January 1699
  - Revolution of 1848: 15 March 1848
  - Settlement of 1868: 26 September 1868
- Currency: Florin
Preceded by
Sanjak of Pojega
Sanjak of Syrmia
Sanjak of Pakrac
Succeeded by
Kingdom of Croatia-Slavonia
Slavonian Military Frontier
- Today part of: Croatia; Serbia
- A: Subordinate to the Kingdom of Croatia (1745–1849), autonomous part of the Kingdom of Croatia and the Austrian Empire (1849–1868)

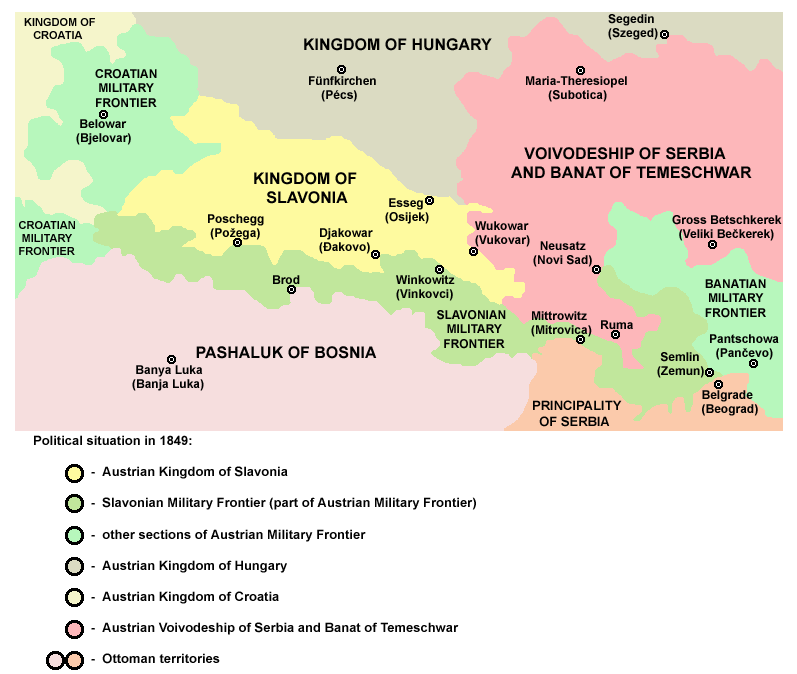
Kingdom of Slavonia in 1849

The Kingdom of Slavonia (Croatian: Kraljevina Slavonija, Latin: Regnum Sclavoniae, Hungarian: Szlavón Királyság, German: Königreich Slawonien, Serbian Cyrillic: Краљевина Славонија) was a kingdom of the Habsburg monarchy and the Austrian Empire that existed from 1699 to 1868. The kingdom included northern parts of present-day regions of Slavonia (today in Croatia) and Syrmia (today in Serbia and Croatia). The southern parts of these regions were part of the Slavonian Military Frontier, which was a component of the Military Frontier separating the Habsburg monarchy from the Ottoman Empire.

== Geography ==
The Kingdom of Slavonia was bounded by the Kingdom of Croatia to the west, the Kingdom of Hungary to the north and the east, and the Ottoman Empire to the south. Together with the Slavonian Military Frontier, Slavonia was about 6,600 miles squared in area. It was divided into the three counties of Požega, Virovitica and Syrmia. Besides a chain of mountains in the middle of the province, the remaining part of the kingdom consisted of extensive plains and fertile eminences planted with vines and fruit trees.

== History ==
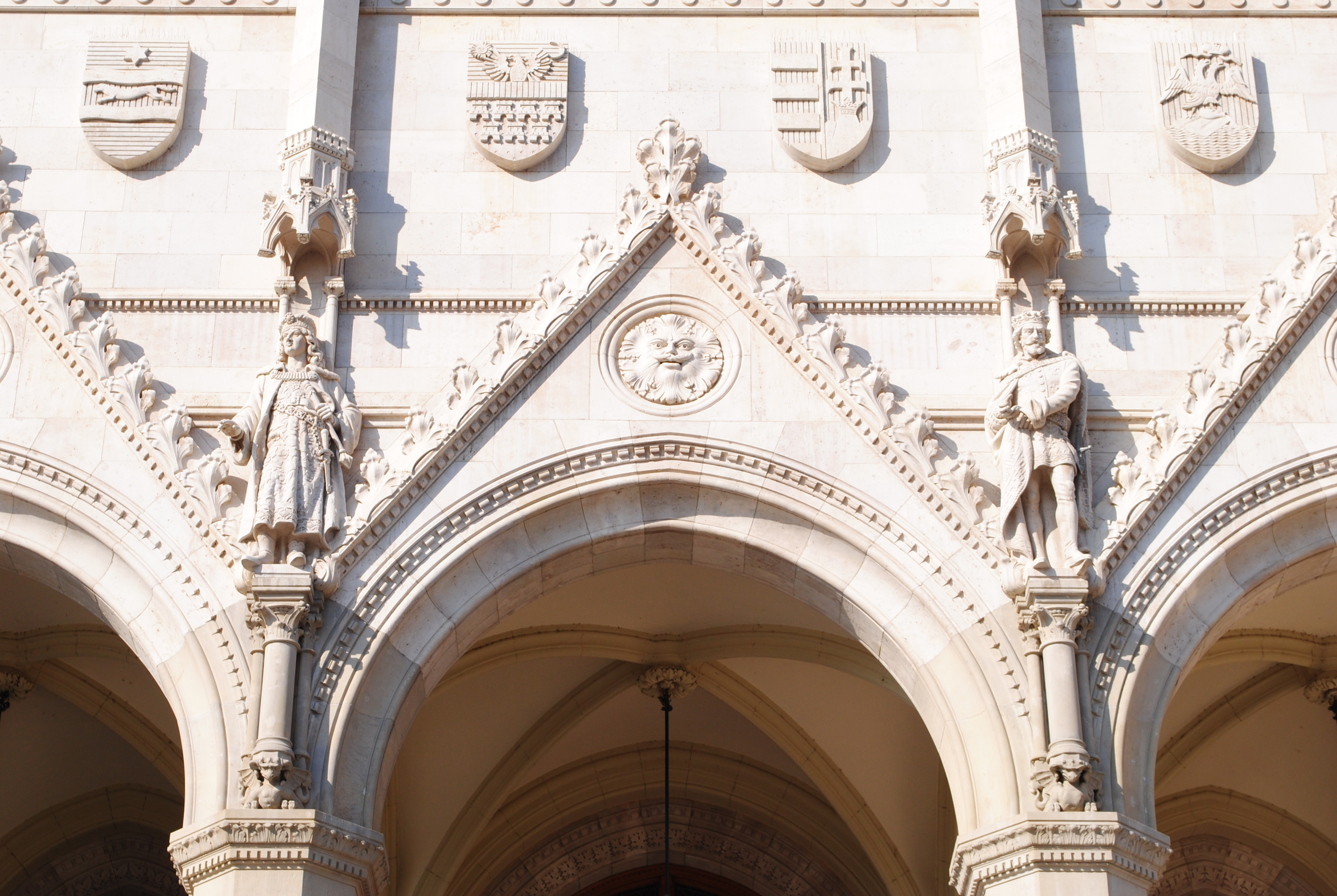
Coat of Arms of Slavonia (first on the left side) at the exterior of the Hungarian Parliament Building.

The Kingdom of Slavonia was formed from territories that the Habsburg monarchy gained from the Ottoman Empire by the Treaty of Karlowitz (1699) that ended the Great Turkish War. Initially, it was a separate Habsburg land under joint civil-military administration that lasted from 1699 to 1745. The inhabitants were exempted from taxes, but were bound to military service. In 1745, the full civil administration was introduced and Kingdom of Slavonia, as one of the Lands of the Hungarian Crown, was administratively included into both the Kingdom of Croatia and Kingdom of Hungary. Following the 1868 Settlement (Nagodba) with the Kingdom of Hungary, Slavonia was joined with the Kingdom of Croatia into the single Kingdom of Croatia-Slavonia, which although it was under the suzerainty of the Crown of Saint Stephen, kept a significant level of self-rule.

== Population ==
After the end of the Great Turkish War, Slavonia was left desolated as around 80% of its pre-war population fled. In order to improve its demographics, people that fled from Slavonia and whose property was taken by the Ottomans were allowed to return to their lands if they had valid ownership documents. Settlers from Bosnia also started migrating to Slavonia, fleeing from the Ottomans. In 1691, around 22,300 Catholics from Bosnian Posavina moved to Slavonia. It is estimated that around 40,000 people lived in Slavonia in 1696. In 1698, its population increased to 80,000.

The 1802 Austrian population data for the Kingdom of Slavonia recorded 148,000 (51.6%) Catholics, 135,000 (47.2%) Orthodox and 3,500 (1.2%) Protestants.

According to other statistical estimations, in 1787 in civil Slavonia there were 265,670 inhabitants, and in 1804/1805 there were 286,349 inhabitants, but from that number clergy and nobility were excluded. Only men were counted in that census. There were: 74,671 Roman Catholics, 68,390 Orthodox Christians, 1,744 Calvinists, 97 Lutherans and 160 Jews. Number of Orthodox Christians was higher in Syrmia: 32,090 Orthodox Christians and 12,633 Roman Catholics. In other two counties of Slavonia: Požega and Virovitica, as in city of Požega, Roman Catholics outnumbered Orthodox population.

The official Austrian census of 1857 for Kingdom of Slavonia gives the following results (a section of Syrmia was in 1857 part of the Voivodeship of Serbia and Banat of Temeschwar):

Požega County

- 63,341 Roman Catholics
- 41,172 Eastern Orthodox
- 837 Jews
- 629 Greek Catholics
- 85 Calvinists
- 44 Lutherans

Osijek County

- 101,559 Roman Catholics
- 35,806 Eastern Orthodox
- 4,257 Calvinists
- 1,784 Jews
- 629 Greek Catholics
- 69 Lutherans

== Economy ==
The Kingdom of Slavonia was mostly an agricultural land, just like the Kingdom of Croatia, and it was known for its silk production. Agriculture and the breeding of cattle were the most profitable occupations of the inhabitants. It produced corn of all kinds, hemp, flax, tobacco, and great quantities of liquorice. The quantity of wine produced was also large, especially in the county of Srem. In 1857 industrial employment (11.01%) was highest in the County of Osijek, while 72.3% were employed in agriculture (82.9% in the Požega County).

== See also ==
- Kingdom of Croatia (Habsburg)
- Sanjak of Požega
- Slavonian Military Frontier
- Kingdom of Dalmatia
- Timeline of Croatian history
- Slavonia
- Lordship of Vukovar

== Literature ==
- Taube, Friedrich Wilhelm von (1777). Historische und geographische Beschreibung des Königreiches Slavonien und des Herzogthumes Syrmien. Vol. 1. Leipzig.
- Taube, Friedrich Wilhelm von (1777). Historische und geographische Beschreibung des Königreiches Slavonien und des Herzogthumes Syrmien. Vol. 2. Leipzig.
- Taube, Friedrich Wilhelm von (1778). Historische und geographische Beschreibung des Königreiches Slavonien und des Herzogthumes Syrmien. Vol. 3. Leipzig.
