= 1921 in Croatia =

- Decades: 1900s; 1910s; 1920s; 1930s; 1940s
- See also: Other events of 1921 · Timeline of Croatian history

Events from the year 1921 in Croatia.

== Incumbents ==
- Monarchs:
  - Peter I (until 16 August)
  - Alexander I (from 16 August)

== Births ==
- February 18 – Branko Bauer, film director (died 2002)
- March 27 – Ivan Rabuzin, painter (died 2008)
- March 28 – Walter Neugebauer, comic book artist and animator (died 1992)
- May 4 – Edo Murtić, painter (died 2005)
- June 10 – Ivan Kožarić, sculptor (died 2020)
- June 22 – Radovan Ivšić, poet and dramatist (died 2009)
- November 27 – Vojin Jelić, writer and poet (died 2004)

== Deaths ==
- January 23 – Josip Marohnić, influential emigrant in the Americas (born 1866)
- August 16 – Peter I of Serbia (born 1844)
