= 1922 in Croatia =

- Decades: 1900s; 1910s; 1920s; 1930s; 1940s
- See also: Other events of 1922 · Timeline of Croatian history

Events from the year 1922 in Croatia.

== Incumbents ==
- Monarch – Alexander I

== Events ==
- February 19 – First issue of Borba, the newsletter of the banned Yugoslav Communist Party, published in Zagreb.

== Births ==
- January 7 – Ivan Milat-Luketa, painter and sculptor (died 2009)
- February 11 – Ivo Padovan, physician (died 2010)
- April 10 – Vesna Parun, poet (died 2010)
- May 10 – Krešo Golik, film director and screenwriter (died 1996)
- May 14 – Franjo Tuđman, statesman (died 1999)
- May 22 – Mirjana Gross, historian (died 2012)
- July 1 – Kruno Prijatelj, art historian (died 1998)
- September 12 – Jure Bilić, communist politician (died 2006)
- September 21 – Vladimir Ruždjak, opera singer (died 1987)
- November 9 – Maja Bošković-Stulli, ethnologist (died 2012)
- November 30 – Nenad Lhotka, ballet master (died 2011)

== Deaths ==
- February 5 – Slavoljub Eduard Penkala, inventor (born 1871)
- February 7 – Vinko Dvořák, Czech-Croatian physicist and former Rector of the University of Zagreb (born 1848)
- April 23 – Vlaho Bukovac, painter (born 1855)
