= 1919 in Croatia =

- Decades: 1890s; 1900s; 1910s; 1920s; 1930s
- See also: Other events of 1919 · Timeline of Croatian history

Events from the year 1919 in Croatia.

== Incumbents ==
=== National ===
- Monarch – Peter I (ruler of the Kingdom of the Serbs, Croats and Slovenes)
- Prime Ministers:
  - Stojan Protić (People's Radical Party) until 16 August 1919
  - Ljubomir Davidović (Democratic Party) from 16 August 1919

== Events ==
Fran Krsto Frankopan and Petar Zrinski were reburied in the Zagreb Cathedral.

== Sport ==
- The Yugoslav Olympic Committee founded in Zagreb. Recognized by the International Olympic Committee in 1920, it was later moved to Belgrade in 1927.

== Births ==
- January 10 – Janko Bobetko, general (died 2003)
- January 15 – Mladen Delić, sports commentator (died 2005)
- April 15 – Franjo Kuharić, cardinal (died 2002)
- July 28 – Milan Horvat, conductor (died 2014)
- December 8 – Marijan Oblak, archbishop (died 2008)
- December 18 – Jure Kaštelan, poet (died 1990)

== Deaths ==
- February 10 – Antun Radić, scientist and politician (born 1868)
- May 26 – Milan Amruš, politician (born 1848)
