= 1924 in Croatia =

- Decades: 1900s; 1910s; 1920s; 1930s; 1940s
- See also: Other events of 1924 · Timeline of Croatian history

Events from the year 1924 in Croatia.

== Incumbents ==
- Monarch – Alexander I

== Events ==
- January 27 – Treaty of Rome

== Sport ==
- January–February – 1924 Winter Olympics held in Chamonix, in which the Kingdom of Serbs, Croats and Slovenes was represented by a delegation of four sportsmen, including Croats Dušan Zinaja and Mirko Pandaković who competed in cross-country skiing
- April 27 – Football club NK Maksimir founded
- N/A – Football club NK Vrbovec founded
- N/A – Stadion Koturaška football venue opened in Zagreb

== Births ==
- January 9 – Mirko Grmek, medical historian (died 2000)
- March 30 – Milko Kelemen, composer
- June 18 – Nela Eržišnik, actress and comedian (died 2007)
- July 4 – Frano Vodopivec, cinematographer (died 1998)
- July 22 – Fedor Škubonja, film director (died 2008)
- September 5 – Rajka Vali, pop singer (died 2011)
- October 29 – Mirko Vidaković, botanist (died 2002)
- November 21 – Milka Planinc, politician, served as a Prime Minister of Yugoslavia 1982–1986 (died 2010)

== Deaths ==
- October 21 – Viktor Kovačić, architect (born 1874)
- N/A – Aleksandar Rakodczay, politician, served as Ban of Croatia 1907–1908 (born 1848)
