= 1931 in Croatia =

- Decades: 1910s; 1920s; 1930s; 1940s; 1950s
- See also: Other events of 1931 · Timeline of Croatian history

Events from the year 1931 in Croatia.

== Births ==
- April 4 – Nada Iveljić, children's writer (died 2009)
- May 11 – Zlatko Crnković, translator (died 2013)
- July 11 – Anđelko Klobučar, composer
- June 4 – Antun Vrdoljak, actor and film director
- June 14 – Vasko Lipovac, painter (died 2006)
- September 26 – Ivo Šlaus, physicist
- November 22 – Anton Tus, soldier
- December 11 – Sunčana Škrinjarić, children's writer (died 2004)

== Deaths ==
- February 11 – Bela Čikoš Sesija, painter (born 1864)
- February 18 – Milan Šufflay, historian and politician (born 1879)
- December 29 – Oton Kučera, astronomer (born 1857)
