= 1915 in Croatia =

- Decades: 1890s; 1900s; 1910s; 1920s; 1930s
- See also: Other events of 1915 · Timeline of Croatian history

Events from the year 1915 in Croatia.

== Incumbents ==
- Monarch – Franz Joseph I
- Ban of Croatia – Iván Skerlecz

== Births ==
- March 10 – Joža Horvat, writer (died 2012)
- March 12 – Bruno Knežević, footballer (died 1982)
- April 8 – Ivan Supek, physicist (died 2007)
- June 5 – Vojin Bakić, sculptor (died 1992)
- September 27 – Milan Antolković, footballer (died 2007)

== Deaths ==
- August 12 – Marcel Kiepach, inventor (born 1894)
