= 1912 in Croatia =

- Decades: 1890s; 1900s; 1910s; 1920s; 1930s
- See also: Other events of 1912 · Timeline of Croatian history

Events from the year 1912 in Croatia.

== Incumbents ==
- King - Franz Joseph I
- Ban - Nikola Tomašić

== Events ==
- 1 January - Croatian is introduced as the official language in Dalmatia.

== Arts and literature ==
- Tajna Krvavog mosta, the first novel in the Grička vještica series by Marija Jurić Zagorka, is serialized in Male novine.

== Sport ==
- 5 May - Maksimir stadium opened.
- 12 May - The Croatian Chess Federation is established.
- 12 June - The football section of the Croatian Sports Association is formed.
- 20 August - HŠK Slaven formed.

== Births ==
- 5 February - Josip Palada, tennis player (died 1994).
- 15 July - Aleksandar Goldštajn, law scholar, writer and constitutional court judge (died 2010)
- 15 November - Ivana Lang, composer and pianist (died 1982).

== Deaths ==
- 21 May - Natko Nodilo, politician and historian (born 1834).
