= 1913 in Croatia =

- Decades: 1890s; 1900s; 1910s; 1920s; 1930s
- See also: Other events of 1913 · Timeline of Croatian history

Events from the year 1913 in Croatia.

== Incumbents ==
- Monarch – Franz Joseph I
- Ban of Croatia (until 21 July) – Slavko Cuvaj
- Ban of Croatia (rest of year until 29 June 1917) - Iván Skerlecz

== Events ==
- July 21 – Slavko Cuvaj relieved from the post of the Royal Commissioner for Croatia-Slovenia. He had been appointed in January 1912, when anti-Habsburg sentiments were on the rise in Croatia, often manifesting in sympathies for Serbia and calls for the creation of Yugoslavia. Cuvaj tried to curb those trends by a series of decrees directed at curbing press freedom, limiting rights of assembly and local autonomy. This created a backlash in the form of strikes and demonstrations, and Cuvaj himself was target of two assassination attempts in 1912.
- November 27 – Iván Skerlecz proclaimed Ban and called for parliamentary elections.
- December 16–17 – Parliamentary elections are held in the Kingdom of Croatia-Slavonia. The Croat-Serb Coalition wins with 39.09% of the vote.

== Arts and literature ==
- Ivana Brlić-Mažuranić released the children's book The Brave Adventures of Lapitch (Čudnovate zgode šegrta Hlapića) in Zagreb.

== Sport ==
- Football club HNK Dinara founded in Knin (as SK Lav).

== Births ==
- January 7 – Franjo Glaser, footballer (died 2003)
- January 9 – Fedor Hanžeković, film director (died 1997)
- February 22 – Ranko Marinković, writer (died 2001)
- March 21 – Ivan Goran Kovačić, poet and writer (died 1943)
- April 8 – Rudi Supek, sociologist (died 1993)
- November 25 – Franjo Punčec, tennis player (died 1985)

== Deaths ==
- October 7 – Ivan Banjavčić, politician (born 1843)
- April 16 – Miroslav Kraljević, painter (born 1885)
