= 1936 in Croatia =

- Decades: 1910s; 1920s; 1930s; 1940s; 1950s
- See also: Other events of 1936 · Timeline of Croatian history

Events from the year 1936 in Croatia.

== Births ==
- February 17 – Stipe Šuvar, sociologist and politician (died 2004)
- April 8 – Milivoj Solar, literary critic
- April 29 – Miroslav Šutej, painter (died 2005)
- March 9 – Dina Merhav, sculptor (died 2022)
- July 8 – Gabi Novak, singer
- August 3 – Vice Vukov, singer and politician (died 2008)
- November 18 – Ante Žanetić, footballer

== Deaths ==
- September 15 – Svetozar Pribićević, ethnic Serb politician (born 1875)
- December 18 – Andrija Mohorovičić, meteorologist and seismologist (born 1857)
- December 24 – Dragutin Gorjanović-Kramberger, paleontologist (born 1856)
