= 2010 in Croatia =

- Decades: 1990s; 2000s; 2010s; 2020s
- See also: Other events of 2010; Timeline of Croatian history

Events from the year 2010 in Croatia.

== Incumbents ==
- President – Stjepan Mesić (until 18 February), Ivo Josipović (starting 19 February)
- Prime Minister – Jadranka Kosor
- Speaker – Luka Bebić

== Events ==
Ongoing – Accession of Croatia to the European Union

- 10 January – Second round of the presidential election is held. Ivo Josipović beats Milan Bandić winning 60.3% of the vote.
- 18 February – Ivo Josipović officially inaugurated as President at St. Mark's Square in Zagreb.
- 10 December – Former Prime Minister Ivo Sanader is arrested in Austria over charges of corruption

== Arts and literature ==
- 6 March – Girl group Feminnem win the 2010 Eurovision national pre-selection competition.
- 27 May – Feminnem perform in the Eurovision Song Contest 2010 semi-final in Oslo but fail to progress to the finals.
- 10–24 July – The 2010 Pula Film Festival is held. The film Just Between Us directed by Rajko Grlić wins the Big Golden Arena for Best Film award.

== Sport ==
- 3 and 6 January – The Snow Queen Trophy slalom race held at Sljeme in Zagreb.
- 1–7 February – The 2010 PBZ Zagreb Indoors tennis tournament held in Zagreb.
- 27 March – The K-1 ColliZion 2010 Croatia martial arts event held in Split.
- 10–16 May – The 2010 Zagreb Open tennis tournament held in Zagreb.
- 26 July–1 August – The 2010 ATP Studena Croatia Open Umag tennis tournament is held in Umag.
- 29 August – The 2010 Speedway Grand Prix of Croatia held in Donji Kraljevec.
- 1 September – The Hanžeković Memorial international track and field event is held in Zagreb.
- 4–5 September – The 2010 IAAF Continental Cup international track and field sporting event is held in Split.
- 9–11 December – The 2010 Golden Spin of Zagreb international figure skating competition is held in Zagreb.

== Deaths ==
- January 14 – Ante Babaja, film director (born 1927).
- February 2 – Svetozar Kurepa, mathematician (born 1929)
- February 19 – Mladen Veža, painter (born 1916).
- July 24 – Mia Oremović, actress (born 1918).
- July 26 – Mićun Jovanić, footballer (born 1952).
- August 12 – Velimir Kljaić, handball coach (born 1946).
- August 22 – Stjepan Bobek, footballer (born 1923).
- October 7 – Milka Planinc, politician (born 1924).
- October 20 – Aleksandar Goldštajn, 98, law scholar, writer and constitutional court judge.(born 1912).
- October 25 – Vesna Parun, poet (born 1922).

== See also ==
- 2010 in Croatian television
