= 1911 in Croatia =

- Decades: 1890s; 1900s; 1910s; 1920s; 1930s
- See also: Other events of 1911 · Timeline of Croatian history

Events from the year 1911 in Croatia.

== Incumbents ==
- Ruler of Austria-Hungary – Franz Joseph I
- Ban of Kingdom of Croatia-Slavonia – Nikola Tomašić

== Events ==
- The Union chocolate factory (present-day Kraš) opened in Zagreb.
- Slavoljub Penkala and Edmund Moster opened the Penkala-Moster pen and pencil company (present-day TOZ-Penkala) in Zagreb.

== Arts and literature ==
- January 12 – Blagoje Bersa's opera Oganj (Der Eisenhammer) premiered at the Croatian National Theatre in Zagreb.
- Ante Kovačić published his novel U registraturi (originally published as a serial in Vienac in 1888).
- Dinko Šimunović published his novel Tuđinac.

== Sport ==
- February 13 – Foundation of HNK Hajduk Split football club.
- April 26 – Foundation of 1. HŠK Građanski football club.

== Births ==
- February 4 – Antun Nalis, actor (died 2000).
- April 13 – Ico Hitrec, footballer (died 1946).
- October 28 – Rade Končar, communist leader and World War II resistance fighter (died 1942).

=== Full date unknown ===
- Slavko Kodrnja, footballer (died 1970).

== Deaths ==
- June 18 – Franjo Kuhač, conductor and musicologist (born 1834).
- July 16 – August Harambašić, writer, publisher and translator (born 1861).
- December 17 – Josip Frank, politician (born 1844).

=== Full date unknown ===
- Leo Hönigsberg, architect (born 1861).
