= Operation Whirlwind =

Failed 1991 offensive during the Croatian War of Independence

Coordinates: 45°26′47″N 16°04′12″E

- Part of the Croatian War of Independence
- Operation Whirlwind bridgehead on the map of Croatia. JNA-held area in late December 1991 are highlighted red.
Date	11–13 December 1991
Location	Banovina, Croatia
Result	Yugoslav-SAO Krajina victory

Belligerents
Croatia	Yugoslavia; SAO Krajina

Commanders and leaders
(Croatia) Božo Budimir (Croatia) Franc Ferenčak	Boško Džombić

Strength
~2,100	~1,500

Casualties and losses
18 killed 18 wounded	20 killed 3 POW; 1 missing

Operation Whirlwind (Croatian: Operacija Vihor) was a failed Croatian Army (HV) offensive in the Banovina region of Croatia, fought from 11–13 December 1991, during the early stages of the Croatian War of Independence. The offensive employed a single infantry brigade as the main attacking force, supported by a bridging unit and a handful of tanks and armoured personnel carriers. Although the offensive met hardly any resistance in its initial stage, achieving tactical surprise, the operation was poorly planned, supported and executed as a result of limited training and combat experience. The offensive established a short-lived bridgehead, evacuated in panic two days after the operation commenced, under tank and mortar fire from the Yugoslav People's Army (JNA) deployed north of Glina.

The operation was criticised for its poor planning and execution, insufficient preparation, reconnaissance and training, and inappropriate command and control methods applied by the Sisak Operational Group in charge of the offensive. It also lacked clear objectives. Afterwards, Croatian military authorities investigated the offensive, but found that there was very little written documentation, including written unit-level orders, pertaining to the operation. That led Admiral Davor Domazet-Lošo to conclude that the offensive was not formally authorised. The formal investigation did not specifically charge anyone with the failures, simply specifying the problems observed instead.

== Background ==
In 1990, following the electoral defeat of the government of the Socialist Republic of Croatia, ethnic tensions worsened. The Yugoslav People's Army (Jugoslovenska Narodna Armija – JNA) confiscated Croatia's Territorial Defence (Teritorijalna obrana - TO) weapons to minimize resistance. On 17 August, the tensions escalated into an open revolt by Croatian Serbs, centred on the predominantly Serb-populated areas of the Dalmatian hinterland around Knin, parts of the Lika, Kordun, Banovina and eastern Croatia. This was followed by two unsuccessful attempts by Serbia, supported by Montenegro and Serbia's provinces of Vojvodina and Kosovo to obtain the Yugoslav Presidency's approval for a JNA operation to disarm Croatian security forces in January 1991.

After a bloodless skirmish between Serb insurgents and Croatian special police in March, the JNA itself, supported by Serbia and its allies, asked the Federal Presidency to give it wartime authorities and declare a state of emergency. The request was denied on 15 March, and the JNA came under the control of Serbian President Slobodan Milošević. Milošević, preferring a campaign to expand Serbia rather than to preserve Yugoslavia, publicly threatened to replace the JNA with a Serbian army and declared that he no longer recognized the authority of the Federal Presidency. By the end of the month, the conflict had escalated into the Croatian War of Independence. The JNA stepped in, increasingly supporting the Croatian Serb insurgents, and preventing Croatian police from intervening. In early April, the leaders of the Croatian Serb revolt declared their intention to integrate the area under their control, known as SAO Krajina, with Serbia. The Government of Croatia viewed this declaration as an attempt to secede.

In May, the Croatian government responded by forming the Croatian National Guard (Zbor narodne garde - ZNG), but its development was hampered by a United Nations (UN) arms embargo introduced in September. On 8 October, Croatia declared independence from Yugoslavia, and a month later the ZNG was renamed the Croatian Army (Hrvatska vojska - HV). Late 1991 saw the fiercest fighting of the war, as the 1991 Yugoslav campaign in Croatia culminated in the Siege of Dubrovnik, and the Battle of Vukovar. In western Slavonia, the HV managed to push back the JNA at several points, and secure Papuk Mountain in early December in Operation Otkos 10.

== Order of battle ==
The principal force committed to the offensive, planned by the HV Sisak Operational Group (OG), was the 102nd Infantry Brigade, attached to the Sisak OG by the Zagreb Operational Zone command, as the single combat unit deployed as a reserve in the Sisak OG area of responsibility (AOR).

Besides the 102nd Brigade, commanded by Captain Franc Ferenčak, the Zagreb Operational Zone deployed an armoured-mechanised unit, attached directly to the Zagreb Operational Zone, into the Sisak OG AOR. The unit consisted of eight tanks and two armoured personnel carriers.

The Sisak OG assigned the 10th Brigade of the Croatian TO to support the right flank of the 102nd Infantry Brigade. Protection of the left flank was assigned to the 2nd Battalion of the 2nd Guards Brigade, supported by the 2nd Battalion of the 144th Infantry Brigade.

To reinforce the 102nd Infantry Brigade and the independent armoured-mechanised unit, ten soldiers from the Glina Battalion were attached to each battalion of the 10th and 102nd brigades; two soldiers were assigned to serve as guides for each tank. In addition, the Glina Battalion was tasked with reconnaissance, harassment of JNA's rear and securing captured infrastructure.

Sisak special police were assigned to support the Glina Battalion, and indirectly the main offensive force. The 36th Engineering-Pontoon Battalion was tasked with the Kupa River crossing by the 102nd Infantry Brigade. The Sisak OG was commanded by Major General Božo Budimir.

The Croatian Serb TO and JNA defences immediately west of the city of Sisak and north of Glina were positioned along the right (southern) bank of the Kupa River, largely consisting of the JNA 592nd and the 622nd Mechanised Brigades. On the opposite bank, the HV 100th Infantry Brigade held positions west of Sisak, flanked by the 145th Infantry Brigade to its right, and the 10th brigade of the Croatian TO further to the west. The planned main axis of the Operation Whirlwind extended across the 592nd Mechanised Brigade AOR, commanded by Colonel Boško Džombić.

== Timeline ==
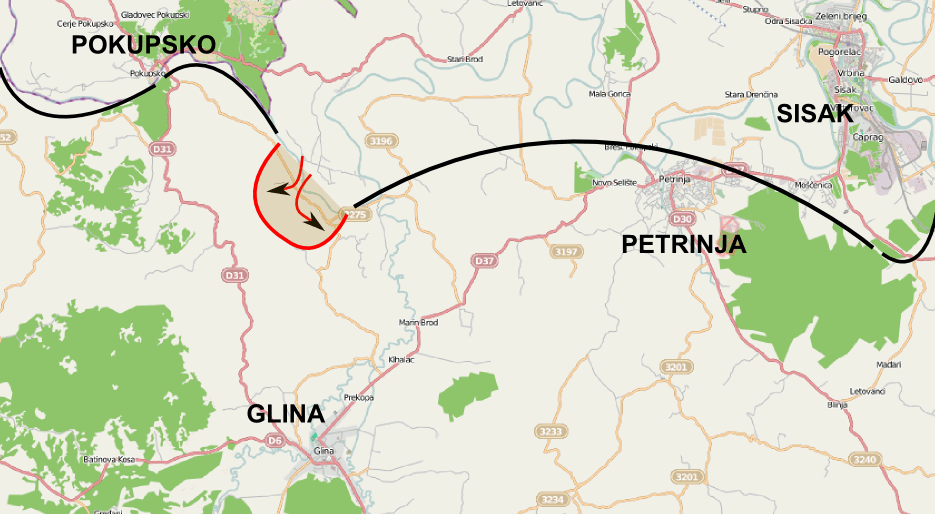
A map of Operation Whirlwind Frontline in December 1991 HV advance 11–12 December 1991 HV bridgehead 11–13 December 1991

The HV 102nd Infantry Brigade arrived at the Sisak OG AOR on 11 December 1992, and was ordered to undertake the offensive on the same evening, at about 20:00, leaving no time for any preparation or reconnaissance. A reconnaissance–sabotage detachment of the HV Glina Battalion and the special police force were ferried across the Kupa River on the night of 11/12 December, capturing the village of Stankovac and preparing to support the 102nd Infantry Brigade at the river crossing. The 36th Engineering-Pontoon Battalion completed a crossing point in the village of Šišinec by 4:00 and the lead elements of the 102nd Infantry Brigade crossed the Kupa River a half-hour later.

The river crossing was unopposed until 08:00, when the defending force launched a mortar attack against the crossing point. Nonetheless, the 1st Battalion of the 102nd Infantry Brigade cleared the river by 09:00 that morning and reached Stankovac.

After spending three hours crossing the Kupa River, by 13:00 the independent armoured-mechanised unit was headed for Mala Solina, 6 kilometres (3.7 miles) to the south. However, the unit was intercepted by JNA armour and forced to turn back to Stankovac. To further complicate the situation for the HV, the 10th Brigade did not even start to move south, while the 2nd Battalion of the 102nd Independent Brigade would not cross Kupa before its commander joined the unit at 16:00.

The 3rd Battalion of the 102nd Infantry Brigade reached the village of Vratečko on the right (southern) bank of the Kupa River, but was unable to join the force south of Kupa. A bridge separating the battalion from the rest of the brigade remained out of HV's control.

By the evening, the 2nd Battalion was ordered to separate from the main axis of the offensive and protect the right flank of the 1st Battalion of the 102nd Brigade—performing the task originally assigned to the 10th Brigade of the Croatian TO. At the same time, the 10th Brigade commanding officer was relieved of duty for failure to advance. Regardless, the unit remained inactive. The HV units that managed to cross the river on 12 December surprised the JNA and reported inflicting considerable casualties.

On the night of 12/13 December, the air temperature dropped to −15 °C (5 °F), and HV troops sought shelter in Stankovac until the morning—shrinking the bridgehead held by the 102nd Infantry Brigade. In addition, the 36th Engineering-Platoon Battalion removed engineering equipment from the Kupa crossing, leaving behind only four to six boats. The command post of the 102nd Infantry Brigade remained in Farkašić, detached from the main offensive force in Stankovac.

On 13 December, at approximately 07:00, the independent HV armoured-mechanised unit advanced northwest along the Kupa, towards Gračanica. During the advance, one of the tanks was captured and its crew killed after the capture. Nearly simultaneously, the JNA commenced a tank and mortar attack against Stankovac and the river crossing at Šišinec. The HV armoured-mechanised unit and the 1st Battalion of the 102nd Infantry Brigade panicked, believing the crossing point was lost, and started to fall back to Šišinec in disarray, sustaining considerable casualties. Since there was no way to transport the remaining HV armour across the Kupa River, the tanks were destroyed by one of the force's own tanks. That tank was then destroyed with explosives to prevent its capture. As there were too few boats at the river crossing to allow a quick retreat, some of the troops swam across the river, causing several to drown in very cold water. The command post of the brigade fell back to Galdovo, while the troops started to retreat to Zagreb. The entire brigade was back in Zagreb by 15 December.

== Aftermath ==
While the JNA's casualties are not known, the HV sustained a loss of 18 killed and 18 wounded, as well as a loss of eight tanks, two armoured personnel carriers and seven boats. The 2,011-strong 102nd Infantry Brigade alone suffered 13 dead. Their names were later inscribed on a memorial plaque in Šišinec, at the Kupa River crossing point. In the aftermath of the offensive, there were speculations in Croatia that the casualties were much higher, possibly as many as 60 killed and 200 wounded.

A Croatian Serb paramilitary unit, "Šiltovi", based in Glina, is suspected of killing HV troops taken as prisoners of war during the retreat. In addition, Croatian Serb forces killed 21 civilians in the Joševica massacre as retribution for the HV offensive. The killing was investigated by SAO Krajina authorities, which concluded that the killings were in revenge for the deaths of 21 Serb paramilitaries in the village of Gračenica in Operation Whirlwind. In 2010, Croatian authorities charged six individuals with war crimes committed in the village of Joševica.

The failed offensive was investigated by the HV in 1991 and researched later by retired HV Brigadier Vlado Hodalj. He concluded that the offensive failed because of overall poor planning and preparation, specifically citing the lack of reconnaissance and reserves. Furthermore, Hodalj cited inadequate leadership by the Sisak OG as a cause of the failure, pointing to inaction in respect of the 10th Brigade's failure to advance and improper employment of the 2nd Guards Brigade in an auxiliary role, protecting the flank of an inexperienced brigade that was committed to the offensive with little, if any, training. Finally, the offensive itself had no clear goal. Croatian Admiral Davor Domazet-Lošo also criticised the offensive as an unnecessary, purely tactical and politically counterproductive move, likely unauthorised by appropriate authorities.

Hodalj praised the Sisak OG command for managing to keep the operation a secret until it was launched, making sure it would surprise the JNA. The secrecy was reflected in the apparent last-minute rerouting of the 102nd Infantry Brigade to the offensive, although the Zagreb Operational Zone deployed it to Sunja, to the east of Sisak. Still, the Sisak OG failed to prepare detailed river crossing plans, or even issue maps and written brigade-level commands for the crossings—relying on oral commands instead. Likewise, the troops were not equipped to endure the cold weather in the open, limiting their effectiveness. Hodalj concluded that the offensive exceeded needs and capabilities of the Sisak OG. Even though the 1991 HV investigation concluded that the offensive was prepared for ten days and was approved by Zagreb Operational Zone command, there are no documents pertaining to the preparations other than those issued by the Sisak OG itself. Regardless of the poor preparation of the offensive, the 102nd Infantry Brigade was subject to public criticism in Croatia for fleeing the battlefield in the aftermath of Operation Whirlwind.
