= 2009 in Croatia =

- Decades: 1980s; 1990s; 2000s; 2010s; 2020s
- See also: Other events of 2009; Timeline of Croatian history

Events from the year 2009 in Croatia.

== Incumbents ==
- President – Stjepan Mesić
- Prime Minister – Ivo Sanader (until 6 July), Jadranka Kosor (starting 6 July)
- Speaker – Luka Bebić

== Events ==
Ongoing – Accession of Croatia to the European Union

- April 1 – Croatia became a full member of NATO.
- July 1 – Ivo Sanader resigns as the Prime Minister of Croatia and President of Croatian Democratic Union.
- July 3 – First Swine Flu case was confirmed by a female from Australia
- July 6 – Jadranka Kosor of the Croatian Democratic Union becomes Prime Minister.
- July 24 – Six people are killed and 55 are injured in the Rudine train derailment.
- December 27 – The first round of presidential elections are held.

== Arts and literature ==
- Igor Cukrov won Dora 2009 on February 28 to become Croatia's representative at the Eurovision Song Contest 2009.

== Sport ==
- Marin Čilić won the 2009 Chennai Open on January 10.
- 2009 World Men's Handball Championship held in Croatian cities from January 16–February 1.
- K-1 Croatia 2009 held in Split on March 21.
- Blanka Vlašić successfully defended her high jump world title on August 20.
- The 2009 Golden Spin figure skating competition is held in Zagreb December 10–12.

== Deaths ==
- January 14 – Dušan Džamonja, sculptor (born 1928)
- January 17 – Tomislav Crnković, footballer (born 1929)
- March 16 – Boris Mutić, sports reporter (born 1939)
- June 9 – Zvonimir Berković, film director (born 1928)
- June 19 – Dalibor Brozović, linguist and politician (born 1927)
- July 14 – Vera Fischer, sculptor (born 1925)
- August 3 – Ivan Milat-Luketa, painter and sculptor (born 1922)
- August 6 – Savka Dabčević-Kučar, politician (born 1923)
- August 28 – Emil Glad, actor (born 1929)
- September 6 – Vanja Drach, actor (born 1932)
- September 6 – Nada Iveljić, children's author (born 1931)
- December 2 – Vjekoslav Šutej, conductor (born 1951)

== See also ==
- 2009 in Croatian television
