= 1988 in Croatia =

- Decades: 1960s; 1970s; 1980s; 1990s; 2000s
- See also: Other events of 1988 · Timeline of Croatian history

Events from the year 1988 in Croatia.

== Sport ==
- Jugoplastika Split became champion of Yugoslavia in basketball.
- Damir Škaro won a bronze medal in light heavyweight boxing at the 1988 Olympics.

== Births ==
- January 5 - Nikola Kalinić, footballer
- May 19 - Antonija Mišura, basketball player
- June 1 - Domagoj Duvnjak, handball player
- November 9 - Josip Čorić, Croatian-Bosnian footballer

== Deaths ==
- January 9 - Juraj Krnjević, leader of the Croatian Peasant Party in exile
- January 16 - Andrija Artuković, Nazi collaborator convicted of war crimes
- February 6 - Zvonimir Rogoz, actor
- August 2 - Nada Klaić, historian
- September 26 - Branko Zebec, footballer
