= 1981 in Croatia =

- Decades: 1960s; 1970s; 1980s; 1990s; 2000s
- See also: Other events of 1981 · Timeline of Croatian history

Events from the year 1981 in Croatia.

== Births ==
- January 14 – Jadranka Đokić, actress.
- January 28 – Marko Babić, footballer.
- February 26 – Tomislav Dujmović, footballer.
- March 29 – Dolores Lambaša, actress.
- April 14 – Jacques Houdek, singer.
- July 6 – Jelena Kostanić Tošić, tennis player.
- September 8 – Žanamari Lalić, singer and winner of Hrvatski Idol (season 1)
- November 27 – Nataša Janjić, actress.
- December 2 – Danijel Pranjić, footballer.
- December 4 – Matija Kvasina, cyclist.
- December 18 – Nives Celsius, singer and writer.

== Deaths ==
- September 2 – Andrija Maurović, comic book author (b. 1901).
- December 29 – Miroslav Krleža, writer (b. 1893).
- December 30 – Franjo Šeper, Cardinal (b. 1905).
