= 2015 in Croatia =

- Decades: 1990s; 2000s; 2010s; 2020s
- See also: Other events of 2015; Timeline of Croatian history

The following lists events that happened in 2015 in the Republic of Croatia.

== Incumbents ==
- President – Ivo Josipović (until 19 February), Kolinda Grabar-Kitarović (starting 19 February)
- Prime Minister – Zoran Milanović

== Events ==
- January 11 - Former diplomat and foreign minister Kolinda Grabar-Kitarović from the Croatian Democratic Union narrowly defeats incumbent president Ivo Josipović and becomes the first female president of Croatia on February 18, 2015.
- September - Croatia co-hosts Eurobasket 2015 with Germany, Latvia and France.
- November 8 - Parliamentary election is held.

== Deaths ==
- March 4 – Dušan Bilandžić, historian and politician
- March 7 – Tomislav Radić, film director
- May 6 – Janko Vranyczany-Dobrinović, politician and diplomat
- August 17 – Arsen Dedić, singer-songwriter, composer and poet
- October 1 – Božo Bakota, footballer
- October 23 – Krunoslav Hulak, chess master
- November 20 – Vlatko Dulić, actor

== See also ==
- 2015 in Croatian television
