= 1989 in Croatia =

- Decades: 1960s; 1970s; 1980s; 1990s; 2000s
- See also: Other events of 1989 · Timeline of Croatian history

Events from the year 1989 in Croatia.

== Incumbents ==
- President of Presidency - Ivo Latin
- Chairman of the Executive Council - Antun Milović

== Events ==
The Croatian musical group Riva won the Eurovision Song Contest 1989.

== Sport ==
- Davor Šuker was the highest scoring player in Yugoslavia's First Federal League, with 18 goals for NK Osijek.
- RK Zagreb was champion of Yugoslavia in handball.
- Dražen Petrović, Toni Kukoč, Dino Rađa, Stojko Vranković, Zoran Čutura, Zdravko Radulović were members of the Yugoslavian team which won EuroBasket 1989.
- HAVK Mladost became champion of Yugoslavia in water polo.
- Dražen Petrović Joins the National basketball association for the Portland Trail Blazers

== Births ==
- 29 April - Domagoj Vida, footballer
- 3 June - Martina Zubčić, taekwondo athlete
- 5 July - Dejan Lovren, footballer

== Deaths ==
- 15 April - Ante Kaštelančić, painter (born 1911)
- 24 April - Dinko Štambak, historian (born 1912)
- 4 October - Lavoslav Horvat, architect (born 1901)
- 9 November - Nenad Petrović, chess problemist (born 1907)
- 15 December - Vanja Sutlić, philosopher (born 1925)
