= 1991 in Croatia =

- Decades: 1970s; 1980s; 1990s; 2000s; 2010s
- See also: Other events of 1991; Timeline of Croatian history

Events from the year 1991 in Croatia.

== Incumbents ==
- President - Franjo Tuđman
- Prime Minister - Josip Manolić

== Events ==
- 21 February - Croatia declares its constitution and law’s supreme to that of the SFRY and the Parliament enacted a formal resolution on the process of disassociation ( Croatian: razdruženje) from SFR Yugoslavia and possible new association with other sovereign republics.
- 31 March – Plitvice Lakes incident
- 19 May - Croatian independence referendum
- 7 October - Bombing of Banski dvori
- 18 November - Three-month siege of Vukovar ends in surrender of Croatian troops
- 19 December – Republic of Serbian Krajina proclaimed.
- 19 December – Croatia is officially recognized by Germany and Iceland.
- 23 December - Croatian dinar introduced.

== Sport ==
- Basketball club KK Cedevita Zagreb founded.
- Basketball club KK Jugoplastika renamed KK Pop 84 Split.
- Football club NK Imotski founded.
- Handball club RK Partizan Bjelovar renamed RK Bjelovar.

== Births ==
- January 19 - Petra Martić, tennis player
- June 19 - Andrej Kramarić, footballer
- July 7 - Franka Batelić, singer
- November 30 - Monika Babok, swimmer

== Deaths ==
- January 5 - Zvonko Lepetić, actor 1928-1991
- May 17 - Slavko Stolnik, painter 1929-1991
- May 25 - Vinko Pintarić, serial killer and outlaw 1941-1991
- July 1 - Josip Reihl-Kir, police chief 1955-1991
- August 9 - Gordan Lederer, photographer and cameraman 1958-1991
- September 21 - Ante Paradžik, politician 1943-1991
- October 16 - Boris Papandopulo, composer and conductor 1906-1991
- November 20 - Siniša Glavašević, journalist 1960-1991
- November 20 - Antun Stipančić, table tennis player 1949-1991
- November 29 - Franjo Majetić, actor 1923-1991
