= 2011 in Croatia =

- Decades: 1990s; 2000s; 2010s; 2020s
- See also: Other events of 2011; Timeline of Croatian history

Events in the year 2011 in Croatia.

== Incumbents ==
- President – Ivo Josipović
- Prime Minister – Jadranka Kosor (until 23 December), Zoran Milanović (starting 23 December)
- Speaker – Luka Bebić (until 22 December), Boris Šprem (from 22 December)

== Events ==
Ongoing – Accession of Croatia to the European Union

- June 11 – The first Split Pride is held.
- July 19 – Former prime minister Ivo Sanader is extradited from Austria
- December 4 – Croatian parliamentary election, 2011

== Arts and entertainment ==
In music: Croatia in the Eurovision Song Contest 2011.

== Sports ==
Football (soccer) competitions: Prva HNL, Druga HNL, Croatian Cup. For more in football (soccer) see: 2010–11 in Croatian football.

In motorsports, Croatia will host the 2011 Speedway Grand Prix of Croatia.

== Deaths ==
- January 3 – Fadil Hadžić, playwright and film director (born 1922)
- April 18 – Ivica Vidović, actor (born 1939)
- June 24 – Tomislav Ivić, football manager
- July 21 – Slavomir Miklovš, Greek Catholic bishop of the Eparchy of Križevci
- July 29 – Ivan Milas, politician
- September 18 – Ivo Škrabalo, film critic and screenwriter
- October 20 – Iztok Puc, handball player (born 1966)
- November 10 – Ana Grepo, businesswoman and model
- November 28 – Ante Marković, politician (born 1924)
- December 10 – Vida Jerman, actress (born 1939)

== See also ==
- 2011 in Croatian television
