= 2017 in Croatia =

- Decades: 1990s; 2000s; 2010s; 2020s
- See also: Other events of 2017; Timeline of Croatian history

Events in the year 2017 in Croatia.

== Incumbents ==
- President – Kolinda Grabar-Kitarović
- Prime Minister – Andrej Plenković
- Speaker – Božo Petrov (until 5 May), Gordan Jandroković (from 5 May)

== Events ==
- 10 April – Ivica Todorić steps down as Agrokor's Chairman of the Board amid the company's financial problems
- 21 May – Croatian local elections, 2017
- 17 to 19 July – A severe wildfire occurred in Split, Croatia.
- 29 November – Upon hearing the guilty verdict upheld in November 2017, Slobodan Praljak stated that he rejected the verdict of the court, and committed suicide by poisoning in the ICTY courtroom in the Hague.

== Deaths ==
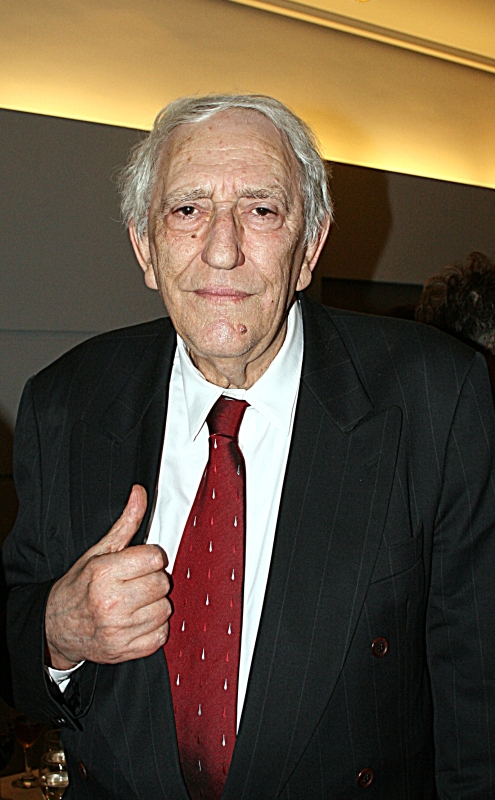
Ivo Brešan

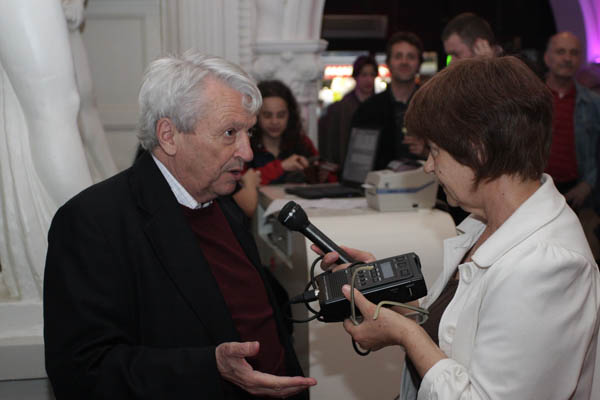
Predrag Matvejević

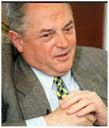
Hrvoje Šarinić

- 3 January – Ivo Brešan, writer (b. 1936).
- 2 February – Predrag Matvejević, writer and political activist (b. 1932).
- 17 February – Marko Veselica, politician and economist (b. 1936)
- 1 March – Vladimir Tadej, film director (b. 1925)
- 7 April – Relja Bašić, actor (b. 1930)
- 21 July – Hrvoje Šarinić, politician (b. 1935)
- 3 August – Bonaventura Duda, Franciscan friar (b. 1924)
- 19 November – Milan Moguš, linguist (b. 1927)
