= 1990 in Croatia =

- Decades: 1970s; 1980s; 1990s; 2000s; 2010s
- See also: Other events of 1990 · Timeline of Croatian history

Events from the year 1990 in Croatia.

== Incumbents ==
- President – Franjo Tuđman
- Prime Minister – Josip Manolić

== Events ==
- January 1 — A new convertible Yugoslav dinar is introduced to combat inflation, at an exchange rate of 10,000 old dinars for 1 new convertible dinar.
- February 14 — The Parliament of the Socialist Republic of Croatia (SR Croatia) adopts constitutional amendments 54 to 63, paving the way for free and democratic elections.
- April 22–May 7 — First democratic election.
- May 5 — 1990 Eurovision Song Contest hosted in Zagreb's Vatroslav Lisinski Concert Hall.
- May 13 — Dinamo Zagreb-Red Star Belgrade riot occurred at Stadion Maksimir in Zagreb.
- July 26 — Croatian national news service HINA founded.
- August 1 — SAO Krajina proclaimed autonomy.
- August 17 — Log Revolution.
- September 7 — Lučko Anti-Terrorist Unit founded.
- October 10 — National postal service Hrvatska pošta (Croatian Post) established.
- December 21 — The flag of Croatia, designed by Miroslav Šutej, adopted.
- December 22 — The new Constitution of Croatia adopted.

== Arts and literature ==
- Brethren of the Croatian Dragon reestablished after being banned by the Communist government in 1946.

== Sport ==
- Croatia played the United States on October 28 in the country's first international football match.
- Jugoplastika Split became Euroleague champion.
- Croatia Open Umag tennis tournament was held for the first time.
- European Championships in Athletics was held in Split.

== Births ==
- June 21 — Sandra Perković, discus thrower
- June 30 — Sandro Sukno, water polo player
- August 17 — Ivan Šarić, chess player
- November 14 — Tereza Mrdeža, Croatian tennis player

== Deaths ==
- February 4 — Toma Bebić, singer-songwriter (b. 1935)
- February 24 — Jure Kaštelan, poet (b. 1919)
- June 7 — Petar Šegvić, rower (b. 1930)
- July 31 — Lovro Radonić, water polo player and butterfly swimmer (b. 1928)
- August 10 — Joško Vidošević, footballer (b. 1935)
- September 12 — Ivo Kurtini, water polo player (b. 1922)
- September 24 — Zlata Kolarić-Kišur, writer (b. 1894)
- September 25 — Vjekoslav Vrančić, Ustase official (b. 1904)
- October 4 — Matija Skurjeni, painter (b. 1898)
- November 30 — Ivan Medarić, footballer (b. 1912)
