= 2016 in Croatia =

- Decades: 1990s; 2000s; 2010s; 2020s
- See also: Other events of 2016; Timeline of Croatian history

The following lists events that happened in 2016 in Croatia.

== Incumbents ==
- President – Kolinda Grabar-Kitarović
- Prime Minister – Zoran Milanović (until 22 February), Tihomir Orešković (22 February – 19 October), Andrej Plenković (starting 19 October)

== Events ==
=== January ===
- Dragan Vasiljković, a former Serbian paramilitary commander, was charged with war crimes in Croatia on 8 January.

=== June ===
- June 1 - A large protest in support of education reform is held in Zagreb and other Croatian cities.

=== August ===
- August 5–21 - 41 athletes from Croatia will compete at the 2016 Summer Olympics in Rio de Janeiro, Brazil

== Deaths ==
- January 23 – Josip Friščić, politician
- February 23 – Slobodan Lang, politician
- April 14 – Ilija Ivezić, actor
- June 18 – Sibe Mardešić, mathematician
- July 18 – Mladen Stilinović, artist
- July 25 – Slobodan Novak, writer
- August 7 – Anđelko Klobučar, composer
- September 10 – Jure Radić, engineer and politician
- October 1 – Jagoda Kaloper, actress
- October 3 – Ljupka Dimitrovska, singer

== See also ==
- 2016 in Croatian television
