= 1914 in Croatia =

- Decades: 1890s; 1900s; 1910s; 1920s; 1930s
- See also: Other events of 1914 · Timeline of Croatian history

Events from the year 1914 in Croatia.

== Incumbents ==
- Monarch – Franz Joseph I
- Ban of Croatia – Iván Skerlecz

== Events ==
- July 28 – Austria-Hungary declares war on Serbia after Serbia rejects the conditions of an ultimatum sent by Austria on July 23 following the assassination of Archduke Francis Ferdinand in Sarajevo by Gavrilo Princip, a member of the Yugoslav nationalist movement Young Bosnia.
- August – Author Ivo Andrić arrested in Split because of his support for Young Bosnia. Convicted for high treason by the Austro-Hungarian authorities, he is imprisoned and eventually released in July 1917.

== Arts and literature ==
- February–March – International graphic arts exhibition held at the Art Pavilion in Zagreb. Contemporary reviews praise the engravings and etchings of Frank Brangwyn and Joseph Pennell.

== Sport ==
- March 5 – Rowing club HVK Gusar founded in Split
- May 1 – Football club NK Lokomotiva founded in Zagreb (as ŽŠK Viktorija)

== Births ==
- February 15 – Ernest Dubac, footballer (died 1985)
- May 21 – Oton Gliha, painter (died 1999)
- July 16 – August Lešnik, footballer (died 1992)
- August 5 – Stjepan Šulek, composer and conductor (died 1986)
- December 21 – Ivan Generalić, painter (died 1992)

== Deaths ==
- February 11 – Armin Pavić, linguist (born 1844)
- March 2 – Franjo Iveković, linguist (born 1834)
- March 17 – Antun Gustav Matoš, writer (born 1873)
- June 8 – Tadija Smičiklas, historian (born 1843)
- September 15 – Franjo Marković, philosopher (born 1845)
- October 26 – Fran Galović, writer (born 1887)
- December 16 – Ivan Zajc, composer (born 1832)
- December 27 – Pero Budmani, linguist (born 1835)
