= Ana Grepo =

Ana Grepo (5 March 1975 – 10 November 2011) was a Croatian businesswoman and former model from Split, Croatia. In 1995, she was crowned "Miss Dalmatia" at a regional beauty pageant in Split. In the last years of her life, she resided in Zagreb, where she managed her own modeling agency. She was one of the main figures to gather young prospective models for the entire area of southeastern Europe and former Yugoslavia.

== Early life ==
Her father Petar was a fisherman and her mother Andja a housewife.

== Modelling career ==
While still in high school, Grepo was drafted by the Midiken modeling agency from Zagreb. Finishing her last high school year in Zagreb, Grepo had become one of the most wanted young models in Croatia.

In late 1995, Grepo moved to Milan and worked for modeling agencies. In the nine-year period between 1996 and 2005, Grepo worked in world fashion capitals, including Madrid, Paris, London, New York and Tokyo. In late 2000, while engaging a full-time model, she started a modelling agency based in Zagreb.

=== Post modelling career and personal life ===
Holding Croatian and Italian citizenships, Ana relocated to Milan in 1995. Over the next decade, she worked in such major cities as London, New York, Tokyo, and Paris. She was briefly married to businessman Dragan Jurilj. During this time, she benefited from business connections and accumulated great wealth and business notoriety.

In 2002, she purchased property on the Croatian shore near Dubrovnik and the Croatian government granted her right to build a five-star casino resort on the Brioni Islands. In the summer of 2006, she entered a bid to purchase a major Croatian basketball team in Cibona, Zagreb; eventually withdrawing the offer. Grepo's dual citizenship enabled her entry to the Italian business market. In early 2007, she bought a share of the Italian soccer club A.C. Chievo from Verona, Italy. In March 2007, she reportedly paid 4.5 million euros for a 16th-century Italian traditional mansion in Verona, Italy.

=== Death ===
Ana Grepo died of carbon monoxide poisoning at her apartment in Osijek. This was deemed an accidental death.
