= 2013 in Croatia =

- Decades: 1990s; 2000s; 2010s; 2020s
- See also: Other events of 2013; Timeline of Croatian history

Events in the year 2013 in Croatia.

== Incumbents ==
- President – Ivo Josipović
- Prime Minister – Zoran Milanović
- Speaker – Josip Leko

== Events ==
Ongoing – Accession of Croatia to the European Union (Until July 1)

- April 14 – First European Parliament election
- May 19 – Local elections, first round
- June 2 – Local elections, second round
- July 1 – Croatia becomes the 28th member state of the European Union
- December 1 – Croatian constitutional referendum on the definition of marriage is held

== Deaths ==
- February 7 – Krsto Papić, film director
- February 13 – Ivan Večenaj, painter
- August 19 – Mirko Kovač, writer
- September 2 – Zvonko Bušić, Croatian independence activist
- September 23 – Vlatko Marković, football manager
- October 23 – Dolores Lambaša, actress
- October 27 – Vinko Coce, singer
- November 2 – Zlatko Crnković, translator

== See also ==
- 2013 in Croatian television
