= Zlata Kolarić-Kišur =

Croatian writer

- Born: 29 October 1894; Slavonski Brod, Kingdom of Croatia-Slavonia, Austria-Hungary
- Died: 24 September 1990 (aged 95); Zagreb, SR Croatia, SFR Yugoslavia
- Occupation: Writer
- Writing career
- Language: Croatian
- Period: 1933–1990

Zlata Kolarić-Kišur (29 October 1894 – 24 September 1990) was a Croatian writer.

Kolarić-Kišur was born in Slavonski Brod, but she moved with her family to Požega. She described her childhood in book Moja Zlatna dolina (My Golden Valley). From 1919 to 1990 she lived in Zagreb. She was married to Hinko Kolarić Kišur. She died in Zagreb on 24 September 1990 at age of 96.

== Works ==
- Naš veseli svijet (1933)
- Iz dječjeg kutića (1935)
- Smijte se djeco! (1935)
- Priča i zbilja (1940)
- Od zore do mraka (1950)
- Zimska priča (1950)
- Po sunčanim stazama (1951)
- Dječje igre (1953, 1956, 1963)
- Neostvarene želje (1954)
- Cvijeće (1955, 1958)
- Ptičji festival (1958, 1959, 1961)
- Uz pjesmu i šalu na jadranskom žalu (1961)
- Moja Zlatna dolina (1972)
- Moje radosti (1981)
- Hrvatski dječji pisci – Pet stoljeća hrvatske književnosti, 181/III (1991)
- Izabrana djela (1994)
