= 2001 in Croatia =

- Decades: 1980s; 1990s; 2000s; 2010s; 2020s
- See also: Other events of 2001; Timeline of Croatian history

The following lists events that happened during 2001 in Croatia.

== Incumbents ==
- President: Stjepan Mesić
- Prime Minister: Ivica Račan
- Speaker: Zlatko Tomčić

== Events ==
- March 28 – Chamber of Counties is abolished.
- December 3 – USKOK is founded.

== Arts and literature ==
- June 30 –Slow Surrender wins the Big Golden Arena for Best Film at the 48th Pula Film Festival.

== Sport ==
- July 9 – Goran Ivanišević wins the Wimbledon Men's Singles title.

== Deaths ==
- January 1 – Fabijan Šovagović, actor (born 1932)
- January 28 – Ranko Marinković, writer (born 1913)
- February 6 – Miro Kačić, linguist (born 1946)
- February 17 – Zvonimir Červenko, general (born 1926)
- July 3 – Ivan Slamnig, poet (born 1930)
- September 5 – Vladimir Žerjavić, economist (born 1912)
- November 6 – Sveto Letica, admiral (born 1926)

== See also ==
- 2001 in Croatian television
