= 2014 in Croatia =

- Decades: 1990s; 2000s; 2010s; 2020s
- See also: Other events of 2014; Timeline of Croatian history

The following lists events that happened during 2014 in the Republic of Croatia.

== Incumbents ==
- President – Ivo Josipović
- Prime Minister – Zoran Milanović
- Speaker – Josip Leko

== Events ==
=== May ===
- 13 May: Floods spread across the Southeast of Europe.
- 19 May: 2014 Southeast Europe floods
  - Around 15,000 people in easternmost parts of Croatia were evacuated from their homes.

=== August ===
- 5 August: Croatian MiG-21 jet crashes 20 km south of Zagreb, with no injuries or fatalities.

=== September ===
- 5 September: First life partnership in Croatia was registered.

=== October ===
- 19 October: Milan Bandić, the mayor of Zagreb, is arrested over charges of corruption.

=== December ===
- December 28 - The Croatian presidential election goes to a run-off between incumbent Ivo Josipović and challenger Kolinda Grabar-Kitarović.

== Sport ==
- 8 September: Marin Čilić wins the 2014 US Open.

== Deaths ==
- January 1 – Milan Horvat, conductor
- January 7 – Ivan Ladislav Galeta, multimedia artist
- January 12 – Zdenko Škrabalo, physician and diplomat
- March 4 – Maja Petrin, actress
- April 3 – Jovan Pavlović, Metropolitan of the Serbian Orthodox Church
- May 11 – Martin Špegelj, general
- May 29 – Miljenko Prohaska, composer and conductor
- August 11 – Vladimir Beara, footballer and football manager
- August 28 – Ivan Ivančić, athletics coach
- October 9 – Boris Buzančić, actor and politician
- October 9 – Ana Karić, actress
