= 2012 in Croatia =

- Decades: 1990s; 2000s; 2010s; 2020s
- See also: Other events of 2012; Timeline of Croatian history

Events in the year 2012 in Croatia.

== Incumbents ==
- President – Ivo Josipović
- Prime Minister – Zoran Milanović

== Events ==
Ongoing – Accession of Croatia to the European Union

- January 22 – 2012 Croatian European Union membership referendum
- November 14 – Economy minister Radimir Čačić sentenced to 22 months in prison by a Hungarian court for causing a traffic accident involving two fatalities.
- November 16 – Croatian generals Ante Gotovina and Mladen Markač are acquitted by the International Criminal Tribunal for the former Yugoslavia.
- November 20 – Former Croatian Prime Minister Ivo Sanader is sentenced to 10 years in prison on bribe-taking.

== Deaths ==
- February 13 – Zlatko Crnković, actor (born 1936)
- February 27 – Helga Vlahović, television personality (born 1945)
- July 23 – Mirjana Gross, historian (born 1922)
- August 7 – Veljko Rogošić, swimmer (born 1941)
- August 14 – Maja Bošković-Stulli, historian (born 1922)
- August 25 – Vesna Girardi-Jurkić, archeologist and politician (born 1944)
- September 30 – Boris Šprem, politician (born 1956)
- October 26 – Joža Horvat, writer (born 1915)
- November 20 – Ivan Kušan, children's writer (born 1933)

== See also ==
- 2012 in Croatian television
