= Aleksandar Goldštajn =

Law professor

- Born: 15 July 1912; Vinkovci, Kingdom of Croatia-Slavonia, Austria-Hungary
- Died: 20 October 2010 (aged 98); Zagreb, Croatia

Aleksandar Goldštajn (15 July 1912 – 20 October 2010) was a prominent Croatian university professor, law scholar, writer and constitutional court judge.

== Early life ==
Goldštajn was born in Vinkovci to a Jewish family. He completed elementary and high school in Vinkovci. Goldštajn attended the University of Zagreb where he studied law. In 1938 he was awarded with his law Ph.D. degree.

== Later life ==
After graduation and his Ph.D. he began his work in Osijek as an apprentice and attorney at law. At the beginning of World War II Goldštajn was arrested and held as a captive in Dalmatia by Italian Fascist. In 1943 he has joined the Yugoslav Partisans, where he managed the civil courts. Since 1945 Goldštajn was a member of ZAVNOH, he also worked on the legislative affairs in the SR Croatia government. After the war he moved to Belgrade where he worked on similar tasks in the government of Socialist Federal Republic of Yugoslavia.

== Career ==
Goldštajn was the main founder of the judiciary in the SFR Yugoslavia, defending the principle of legality. In 1954 he became the first President of the Supreme Economic Court of Yugoslavia. Goldštajn returned to Zagreb in 1959, where he became a regular professor at the Faculty of Law of University of Zagreb at the Department of commercial law. At the university in 1968 he introduced the rights of international trade. Goldštajn attended many international legal specializations in England, France, Switzerland, United States and Germany.

In addition to research and teaching at the university, Goldštajn was named the judge of the Croatian Constitutional Court in 1967. In the meantime, he was also engaged at the international arbitration courts and legal institutions. Since 1958 he was the member of the Arbitration Court of the International Chamber of Commerce in Paris, and member of the International Center for payment and investment in Washington since 1974. Goldštajn was also a member of the Permanent Court of Arbitration at The Hague since 1982.

His scientific interest was in the area of commercial law, international commercial arbitration and contractual rights and the problems of the legal system in Yugoslavia. Goldštajn published numerous books, textbooks, monographs and technical legal debates in the periodical publications of the Institute of Economics in Zagreb and in other national and international publications in London and Zurich.

== Death ==
Goldštajn died in Zagreb on October 20, 2010 and was buried at the Mirogoj Cemetery. He was 98 years old.

== Bibliography ==
- Snješka Knežević, Aleksander Laslo (2011). Židovski Zagreb. Zagreb: AGM, Židovska općina Zagreb. ISBN 978-953-174-393-8.
