= 2000 in Croatia =

- Decades: 1980s; 1990s; 2000s; 2010s; 2020s
- See also: Other events of 2000; Timeline of Croatian history

The following lists events that happened during 2000 in Croatia.

== Incumbents ==
- President:
  - until 2 February: Vlatko Pavletić (acting)
  - 2 February-18 February: Zlatko Tomčić (acting)
  - starting 19 February: Stjepan Mesić
- Prime Minister: Zlatko Mateša (until 27 January), Ivica Račan (starting 27 January)

== Events ==
=== January ===
- January 3 – The 2000 general election held, won by a centre-left coalition of Social Democratic Party of Croatia (SDP) and Croatian Social Liberal Party (HSLS)
- January 24 – First round of the 2000 presidential election held. Stjepan Mesić and Dražen Budiša win 41% and 28% of votes respectively, and enter the run-off.

=== February ===
- February 7 – Presidential election run-off, won by Stjepan Mesić with 56% of the vote.
- February 18 – Stjepan Mesić formally inaugurated as President of Croatia.

=== May ===
- May 28 – Nova TV, the first national commercial television network, begins broadcast.

== Arts and literature ==
- February 19 – Goran Karan won Dora 2000 to become Croatia's representative at the Eurovision Song Contest 2000 with the song "Kad zaspu anđeli".

== Deaths ==
- February 14 – Antun Nalis, actor
- March 9 – Ivo Robić, singer
- August 15 – Ena Begović, actress
- October 11 – Matija Ljubek, canoeist
- November 30 – Vladimir Anić, linguist
- December 7 – Vlado Gotovac, poet and liberal politician (born 1930)

== See also ==
- 2000 in Croatian television
