= Nada Iveljić =

Croatian writer

Nada Iveljić (4 April 1931 – 6 September 2009) was a Croatian children's writer. Her work includes eight books of poetry, a short story collection, a novel, over forty books and a series of picture books for children, and several plays, radio and TV games for adults and children.
