= Mirjana Gross =

Yugoslav-Croatian Jewish historian and writer

- Born: 22 May 1922; Zagreb, Kingdom of Serbs, Croats and Slovenes
- Died: 23 July 2012 (aged 90); Zagreb, Croatia
- Occupations: Writer, historian

Mirjana Gross (born Mirjam Gross; 22 May 1922 – 23 July 2012) was a notable Yugoslav-Croatian Jewish historian and writer. She is the granddaughter of Croatian chess pioneer Izidor Gross.

== Life and career ==
Gross was born in Zagreb to Jewish parents, Mavro and Ella Gross, on 22 May 1922. During World War II and the occupation of Yugoslavia, Gross and her parents hid out near Zagreb in the village of Drenje Brdovečko until 1943, when they were arrested by the Nazis. She and her mother were deported to the Ravensbrück concentration camp where they worked as forced laborers for Siemens & Halske AG producing bombs. Her father was deported to Buchenwald. Gross's father and other members of her family perished during the Holocaust; she and her mother, however, survived.

After the war she became a renowned Yugoslavian history professor. Throughout her career, Gross studied Croatian history of 19th century and historical methodology. In the 1970s, she completed several research projects on modern Croatian history. She authored books on Party of Rights, Ante Starčević and Eugen Kvaternik, among other subjects.

In 1997, the Institute for Croatian History at the Faculty of Humanities and Social Sciences, University of Zagreb dedicated and published a representative collection of scientific articles in Gross's honor.

== Death ==
Gross died on 23 July 2012, aged 90, and was buried at the Mirogoj Cemetery.

== Honors ==
In 2001, Gross received the Josip Juraj Strossmayer award for the most successful and achieved scientific work "Authentic Party of Rights", published in Croatia and Croatian diaspora. In 2005, Gross was named among Croatia's 35 most important women in history.

== Bibliography ==
- Snješka Knežević, Aleksander Laslo (2011). Židovski Zagreb (in Croatian). Zagreb: AGM, Židovska općina Zagreb. ISBN 978-953-174-393-8.
