= Joševica =

- Village
- Location within Croatia
- Coordinates: 45.303687°N 16.10689°E
- Country: Croatia
- Region: Continental Croatia (Banovina)
- County: Sisak-Moslavina
- Town: Glina

Area
  - Total: 3.9 km^{2} (1.5 sq mi)

Population (2021)
  - Total: 34
  - Density: 8.7/km^{2} (23/sq mi)
- Time zone: UTC+1 (CET)
  - Summer (DST): UTC+2 (CEST)

Joševica is a village located just south of Glina in Banovina, central Croatia.

During the Croatian War of Independence, the village was ravaged in the December 1991 Joševica massacre.
