= 1992 in Croatia =

- Decades: 1970s; 1980s; 1990s; 2000s; 2010s
- See also: Other events of 1992 · Timeline of Croatian history

Events from the year 1992 in Croatia.

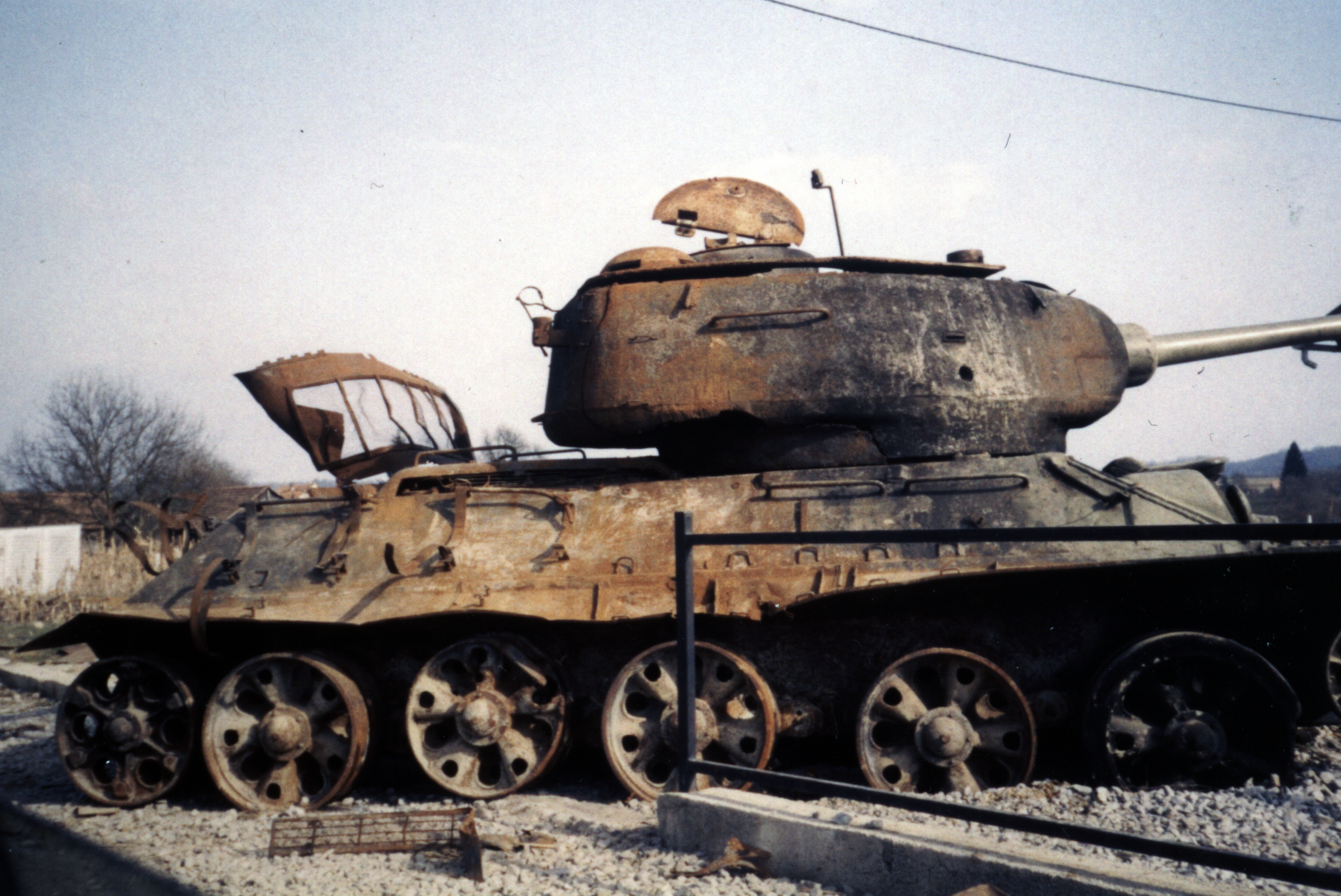
A destroyed T-34-85 tank in Karlovac, Croatia

== Incumbents ==
- President: Stjepan Mesić
- Prime Minister: Franjo Gregurić (until 12 August), Hrvoje Šarinić (starting 12 August)

== Events ==
- 7 January – A European Community Monitor Mission helicopter is downed by the Yugoslav Air Force near Novi Marof, killing five.
- 13 January – Croatia is officially recognized by the Holy See.
- 15 January – Croatia is officially recognised by 19 European countries.
- 17 January – Croatian Olympic Committee is officially recognized by the International Olympic Committee.
- 17 February – Croatia is officially recognized by the Russian Federation.
- 17 March – Croatia is officially recognized by Japan.
- 7 April – Croatia is officially recognized by the United States.
- 16 April – Croatia is officially recognized by Israel.
- 27 April – Croatia is officially recognized by China.
- 22 May – Croatia is admitted to the United Nations.
- August 2 – Parliamentary and presidential elections held in conjunction.

== Sport ==
- July 25 – 1992 Summer Olympics in Barcelona opened, with Croatia competing as an independent country for the first time. Croatian athletes win 1 silver and 2 bronze medals in basketball and tennis.
- February 29 – First season of the newly established Prva HNL kicked off.
- March 24 – First edition of the Croatian Cup launched.

== Births ==
- January 10 – Šime Vrsaljko, footballer.
- April 25 – Kim Daniela Pavlin, swimmer.
- March 5 – Dario Župarić, footballer.
- March 25 – Borna Rendulić, ice hockey forward.
- April 17 – Mislav Komorski, footballer.
- May 6 – Karla Šitić, swimmer.
- June 4 – Dino Jelusić, singer, musician and songwriter.
- August 20 – Matej Delač, footballer.
- November 7 – Mia Dimšić, singer.

== Deaths ==
- April 3 – Ivan Rukavina, soldier and politician (born 1912).
- May 31 – Walter Neugebauer, comic book artist (born 1921).
- July 14 – Slavko Luštica, footballer (born 1923).
- September 3 – Bruno Bjelinski, composer (born 1909).
- November 27 – Ivan Generalić, painter (born 1914).
- December 18 – Vojin Bakić, sculptor (born 1915).
