= Ivan Milat-Luketa =

Croatian painter and sculptor

- Born: 7 January 1922; Blato, Croatia
- Died: 3 August 2009 (age 87); Kutina, Croatia
- Known for: Painting, Drawing, Sculpting
- Notable work: Museum Kutina, 1961 Tabor Grad, 1950 Stratford-upon-Avon, 1981

Ivan Milat-Luketa (7 January 1922 – 3 August 2009) was a Croatian painter and sculptor. He was a painter associated with the modern era in Croatian art.

== Life ==
Ivan Milat-Luketa was born on 7 January 1922 in Blato, Croatia. In 1925, soon after his father had died, he moved to Dubrovnik where he finished primary and grammar schools. In 1945, he attended the Academy of Art in Zagreb and studied sculpture and painting. He graduated in the class of Oton Postružnik. He got a number of awards and prizes for his artistic work

== Works ==
Milat has portrayed his Croatian homeland in many of his landscapes which recorded a vanishing time. Numerous drawings, canvases and aquarelles provide a history of Pula, Dubrovnik, Županja, Kutina and Desinić.

He produced notable portraits and still-life paintings. He is the sculptor of an bronze monument situated in the cemetery of the city of Kutina, a sculptural depiction of two young pioneers.

Art critic Juraj Baldani on creativity of Ivan Milat: "Spontaneity of creation, sincerity in experience, and mastery in performance are the elements of this creativity. He has never torn the straight connection with his impulses and inspirations, with the nature and surrounding people. By building in his art into life, Ivan Milat has been drawing the knowledge from the daily, finding the truth in the simplicity, longing for the beauty through emotions. He has been the painter of the actuality of his life's space and time."

Painter of op-art and new tendencies Miroslav Šutej on Milat's portraits: "We see that he is occupied by a need for rendering the minute feeling. He picks the themes which, by their natural spontaneity, force him to be direct. Made very quickly, those drawings radiate the charm of the moment of the uncatchable children's world."
