= Joševica massacre =

Massacre during the Croatian War of Independence

Coordinates: 45.303687°N 16.10689°E

- Part of the Croatian War of Independence
- Joševica on the map of Croatia, JNA/SAO Krajina-held areas in late 1991 are highlighted in red
- Location: Joševica, Croatia
- Date: 16 December 1991
- Target: Croats
- Attack type: Mass killing, ethnic cleansing
- Deaths: 21
- Perpetrator: SAO Krajina paramilitaries

The Joševica massacre was a war crime committed by the paramilitary forces of the Krajina Serbs in the Croatian village of Joševica during the Croatian War of Independence. The atrocities took place on 16 December 1991.

Serb paramilitary forces killed 21 Croatian civilians in the village of Joševica near the city of Glina. The Serb paramilitaries were members of a reconnaissance and sabotage group of the local Glina Territorial Defense, they entered the village on 16 December 1991, armed with submachine guns attached with silencers, and shot Croat civilians in their homes. One civilian survived the attack with serious wounds. After a few weeks, Serb paramilitary forces perpetrated another massacre, killing another 3 Croats. In total, 32 residents of Joševica out of 133 that had lived in Joševica (census 1991) were killed. The victims were mostly women and elderly, the eldest victim being 90 years old, while four victims were children aged between 10 and 16.

At the time there was no active combat in the Joševica area, as the forces of rebel Serbs had already occupied the area. Serb military commanders had also made guarantees to the local Croats that they would enjoy peace and safety if they did not partake in armed resistance. It has been speculated that the Serb paramilitaries may have committed the massacre in revenge for losses they had sustained in battle with the Croatian Army on the 12 and 13 December 1991.

== Investigation ==
At the time, one Nikola Sužnjević, an investigating judge in the employ of the then-Republic of Serbian Krajina (in 2008 a member of the city council of Glina) had investigated the events and made a detailed record with a precise list of victims and the description of how those persons were killed. Despite that, the occupation authorities of RSK took no further actions, and the perpetrators were not legally processed, despite the existence of witnesses that named the victims.

The State Attorney's Office of the Republic of Croatia (DORH) has indicted six citizens of the Republic of Serbia for the Joševica case. All of them had left for Serbia in 1995 after the Croatian Operation Flash, where they took permanent residence. DORH brought the indictment forward almost 17 years after the events.
