= 2005 in Croatia =

Events from the year 2005 in Croatia.

== Incumbents ==
- President: Stjepan Mesić
- Prime Minister: Ivo Sanader
- Speaker: Vladimir Šeks

== Events ==
=== January ===
- January 2 - First round of presidential elections. Stjepan Mesić and Jadranka Kosor enter into the second round.
- January 16 - Second round of presidential elections. Stjepan Mesić was reelected president.

=== October ===
- October 3 – the European Union has decided to start full membership negotiations with Croatia.

== Arts and literature ==
- March 5 - Boris Novković won Dora 2005 to become Croatia's representative at the Eurovision Song Contest 2005.

== Sport ==
- September 17-25 - Croatia hosted the 2005 Women's European Volleyball Championship in Pula and Zagreb.

== See also ==
- 2005 in Croatian television
