= Timeline of Croatian history =

Chronological history of Croatia

This is a timeline of Croatian history, comprising important legal and territorial changes and political events in Croatia and its predecessor states. Featured articles are in bold. To read about the background to these events, see History of Croatia. See also the list of rulers of Croatia and years in Croatia.

== 7th century ==
| Year | Date | Event |
|---|---|---|
| 660 | | Porga became knez of the Principality of Littoral Croatia. |
| 660 | | Littoral Croatia was Christianized. |

== 8th century ==
| Year | Date | Event |
|---|---|---|
| 799 | | Siege of Trsat: Invading Frankish forces were repelled from Trsat, resulting in the death of their commander Eric of Friuli. |

== 9th century ==
| Year | Date | Event |
|---|---|---|
| 803 | | Borna became knez of Littoral Croatia following the death of his father Višeslav. |
| 810 | | Ljudevit became knez of the Slavs in Lower Pannonia. |
| 823 | | Ljudevit died. |
| 838 | | Knez Ratimir was deposed from the throne of Lower Pannonia in favor of the pro-French Ratbod. |
| 839 | | Knez Mislav of Littoral Croatia signed a peace treaty with the Republic of Venice during the early phase of the Croatian–Venetian wars. |
| 840 | | Venetian Doge Pietro Tradonico led a failed assault on the nearby Croat land of Pagania. |
| 840 | | The Byzantine Emperor Basil I helped break an Arab siege of Dubrovnik. |
| 846 | | Pagania breached Venice and raided the Venetian town of Caorle. |
| 879 | 7 June | Pope John VIII styled knez Branimir of Littoral Croatia Duke of Croats, effectively recognizing Littoral Croatia as an independent state. |
| 887 | 18 September | Venetian Doge Pietro I Candiano was killed in an attempted invasion of Pagania. |

== 10th century ==
| Year | Date | Event |
|---|---|---|
| 925 | | Knez Tomislav of Littoral Croatia was crowned King of a united Croatia, establishing the Trpimirović dynasty |
| 926 | | Croatian–Bulgarian battle of 926: Tomislav defeated the invading forces of the Bulgarian Empire. |
| 928 | | Pope Leo VI transferred the bishopric at Nin to Skradin. |
| 948 | | Venice tried and failed to capture Dubrovnik. |
| 949 | | King Miroslav was killed by Ban Pribina during a civil war started by his younger brother Michael Krešimir II the Great, who succeeded him. |
| 986 | | Byzantine Emperor Basil II recognized Croatia as an independent kingdom and declared King Stephen Držislav the Patriarch of Dalmatia and Croatia. |
| 996 | | Venetian Doge Pietro II Orseolo stopped paying tax to the Croatian King after a century of peace, renewing old hostilities and starting a new phase of the Croatian–Venetian wars. |
| 998 | | Siege of Zadar: Emperor Samuil of Western Bulgarian Tsardom launched a military campaign against Kingdom of Croatia and besieged the city of Zadar. |

== 11th century ==
| Year | Date | Event |
|---|---|---|
| 1000 | | Battle of Lastovo: Doge Pietro II Orseolo of the Republic of Venice attacked the Town of Lastovo in the Kingdom of Croatia and destroyed it. |
| 1020 | | King Krešimir III was accused in the death of his brother Gojslav. Pope Benedict VIII withdrew his title pending an investigation. |
| 1020 | | Krešimir was restored. |
| 1058 | | Peter Krešimir IV succeeded his father Stephen I upon his death. |
| 1076 | 8 October | Demetrius Zvonimir was crowned King in Solin by a representative of Pope Gregory VII. |
| 1091 | | King Stephen II died peacefully without an heir, bringing the Trpimirović dynasty to a close. |
| 1097 | | Battle of Gvozd Mountain: King Petar Snačić died in a loss to King Coloman of Hungary. |

== 12th century ==
| Year | Date | Event |
|---|---|---|
| 1102 | | The Croatian nobility agreed to the Pacta conventa under which Croatia was joined in a personal union with Hungary, with the King appointing the Ban of Croatia and the Croatian nobility holding power in the Sabor. |
| 1185 | | Serbian forces launched a failed siege against Dubrovnik. |

== 13th century ==
| Year | Date | Event |
|---|---|---|
| 1204 | 26 August | Emeric abdicated the throne to his young son Ladislaus III of Hungary. |
| 1205 | 7 May | Ladislaus died. He was succeeded by Emeric's younger brother Andrew II of Hungary. |
| 1235 | 21 September | Andrew died. He was succeeded by his son Béla IV of Hungary. |
| 1242 | 16 November | Béla issued the Golden Bull of 1242, giving the residents of Gradec some individual and democratic rights and releasing them from allegiance to local lords. |
| 1270 | 3 May | Béla died. He was succeeded by his son, Stephen V of Hungary. |
| 1272 | 6 August | Stephen died. He was succeeded by his son Ladislaus IV of Hungary. |
| 1293 | | Paul I Šubić of Bribir became Ban of Croatia. |
| 1299 | | Paul conquered Bosnia, taking the title of Dominus of Bosnia, and appointing his brother Mladen I Šubić of Bribir Ban of Bosnia. |

== 14th century ==
| Year | Date | Event |
|---|---|---|
| 1301 | 14 January | Andrew died without a son. Charles Martel's son Charles I of Hungary was crowned King of Hungary. |
| 1301 | 27 August | The Hungarian nobility crowned Wenceslaus III of Bohemia King of Hungary and Croatia. |
| 1305 | | After quashing resistance in Bosnia, Paul I Šubić took the title Lord of All Bosnia and the exclusive power of coining money. |
| 1305 | 6 December | Wenceslaus III of Bohemia abdicated the throne to Otto III, Duke of Bavaria. |
| 1307 | June | Otto was imprisoned by the Transylvanian Voivode Ladislaus Kán. |
| 1307 | 10 October | The Hungarian nobility elected Charles King. |
| 1308 | | Otto abdicated his claim to the Hungarian throne. |
| 1312 | 1 May | Paul I Šubić died. His son Mladen II Šubić of Bribir succeeded him as Ban. |
| 1322 | | Battle of Bliska: Mladen lost to a coalition of Croatian noblemen at Trogir. |
| 1322 | 8 October | Charles dismissed Mladen as Ban. |
| 1342 | 16 July | Charles died. He was succeeded by his son Louis I of Hungary. |
| 1345 | 12 August | Siege of Zadar was laid by the Republic of Venice. |
| 1358 | 18 February | The Treaty of Zadar was signed. Venice ceded Dalmatia to Croatia. |
| 1370 | 17 November | Louis became King of Poland on the death of Casimir III the Great. |
| 1382 | 11 September | Louis died. He was succeeded in Hungary by his ten-year-old daughter Mary, Queen of Hungary with his wife Elizabeth of Bosnia acting as regent. |
| 1385 | | Mary was overthrown by Charles III of Naples. |
| 1386 | 7 February | Charles was assassinated on Elizabeth's orders. |
| 1387 | 31 March | Mary was again crowned Queen of Hungary. Her husband Sigismund, Holy Roman Emperor was crowned King. |
| 1390 | | Charles's son Ladislaus of Naples expressed a claim to the throne of Hungary. |
| 1392 | | Sigismund appointed Nicholas II Garay Ban of Croatia. |
| 1395 | 17 May | Mary died under suspicious circumstances. Sigismund became the sole ruler of Croatia and Hungary. |
| 1397 | | Nicholas left office. |
| 1397 | 27 February | Bloody Sabor of Križevci: Croatian Ban Stjepan II Lacković was killed in Križevci for supporting Ladislaus against King Sigismund. |

== 15th century ==
| Year | Date | Event |
|---|---|---|
| 1403 | 5 August | Hungarian nobles opposed to Sigismund crowned Ladislaus King. |
| 1406 | | Hermann II, Count of Celje became Ban of Croatia. |
| 1408 | | Hermann left office. |
| 1409 | | Ladislaus sold his rights on Dalmatia to Venice. |
| 1437 | 9 December | Sigismund died. |
| 1438 | 1 January | Sigismund's son-in-law Albert II of Germany was crowned King of Hungary and Croatia according to his will. |
| 1439 | 27 October | Albert died without a male heir; his wife was pregnant with his son Ladislaus the Posthumous. |
| 1440 | 22 February | Ladislaus was born. |
| 1440 | 15 May | Władysław III of Poland accepted the Hungarian crown from the nobility. |
| 1440 | 15 May | Ladislaus's mother crowned him King. |
| 1444 | 10 November | Battle of Varna: Władysław died in a battlefield loss to the Ottoman Empire. The Hungarian nobility elected Ladislaus, then imprisoned in Schloss Ort by his second cousin Frederick III, Holy Roman Emperor, King of Hungary, with John Hunyadi acting as regent. |
| 1452 | | Ladislaus was freed by Ulrich II, Count of Celje, who became his guardian and effectively his regent. |
| 1456 | 9 November | Ulrich was killed by Hunyadi's son Ladislaus. |
| 1457 | 16 March | Ladislaus had Ladislaus Hunyadi beheaded and fled Hungary. |
| 1457 | 23 November | Ladislaus died, probably of leukemia. |
| 1458 | 20 January | The Hungarian nobility elected Ladislaus Hunyadi's brother Matthias Corvinus King. |
| 1472 | | Nicholas of Ilok became Ban of Croatia. |
| 1472 | | Nicholas left office. |
| 1483 | | Matija Gereb was made Ban. |
| 1489 | | Gereb left office. |
| 1490 | 6 April | Matthias died without legitimate heirs. |
| 1490 | 18 September | The Hungarian nobility elected Vladislaus II of Bohemia and Hungary as King. |
| 1493 | 9 September | Battle of Krbava field: Croatia suffered a defeat at the hands of the Ottoman Empire. |
| 1499 | | Matthias's illegitimate son John Corvinus became Ban of Croatia. |

== 16th century ==
| Year | Date | Event |
|---|---|---|
| 1504 | 12 October | Corvinus died. |
| 1513 | | Petar Berislavić was appointed Ban of Croatia. |
| 1516 | 13 March | Vladislaus died. He was succeeded by his ten-year-old son Louis II of Hungary, with a royal council appointed by the Hungarian diet acting as regent. |
| 1520 | 20 May | Berislavić was killed. |
| 1521 | | Ivan Karlović became Ban. |
| 1524 | | Karlović left office. |
| 1526 | 29 August | Battle of Mohács: Louis died childless in a crushing defeat at the hands of the Ottoman Empire near Mohács. |
| 1526 | 10 November | John Zápolya was crowned King of Hungary. |
| 1526 | December | Ferdinand I, Holy Roman Emperor crowned himself King of Hungary. |
| 1527 | | Karlović again became Ban. |
| 1527 | 1 January | 1527 election in Cetin: The Croatian nobility unanimously elected Ferdinand King and confirmed the succession to his heirs, ending the personal union with Hungary. |
| 1527 | 27 September | Battle of Tarcal: Forces allied to Ferdinand dealt a bloody defeat to supporters of Zápolya. |
| 1528 | 20 March | Battle of Szina: Zápolya was defeated and forced to flee to Poland. |
| 1531 | | Karlović died. |
| 1537 | 9 December | Petar Keglević became Ban. |
| 1538 | 24 February | The Treaty of Grosswardein was signed, dividing Hungary between Ferdinand and Zápolya and making Ferdinand heir to the entire kingdom on the death of the then-childless Zápolya. |
| 1540 | 18 July | Zápolya had a son, John II Sigismund Zápolya. |
| 1540 | 22 July | Zápolya died. The Hungarian nobility recognized his son John II as King. |
| 1542 | | Keglević was removed from office. |
| 1542 | 24 December | Nikola Šubić Zrinski was appointed Ban. |
| 1553 | | In response to repeated Ottoman incursions, Ferdinand established the directly administered Croatian Military Frontier. |
| 1556 | | Zrinski was removed from office. |
| 1557 | 7 March | Péter Erdődy was appointed Ban. |
| 1564 | 25 July | Ferdinand died. He was succeeded by his son Maximilian II, Holy Roman Emperor. |
| 1566 | 8 September | Siege of Szigetvár: The forces of the Ottoman Empire suffered losses taking the fortress at Szigetvár that forced them to abandon their advance on Vienna. |
| 1567 | | Erdődy died. |
| 1570 | | Hungarian King John II abdicated the throne to Maximilian. |
| 1573 | 28 January | Croatian–Slovenian peasant revolt: A peasant revolt led by Matija Gubec began which sought to overthrow the power of the nobility. |
| 1573 | 9 February | Croatian–Slovenian peasant revolt: Gubec was captured. |
| 1576 | 12 October | Maximilian died. He was succeeded by his son Rudolf II, Holy Roman Emperor. |
| 1578 | | Krsto Ungnad was appointed Ban. |
| 1583 | | Ungnad left office. He was succeeded as Ban by Tamás Erdődy. |
| 1584 | 26 October | Battle of Slunj: Invading Ottoman forces were defeated by the defending Croatian army. |
| 1592 | | Siege of Bihać: Once capital of Croatia conquered by the Ottomans; never reconquered back, lost for Croatia forever. |
| 1593 | 22 June | Battle of Sisak: Croatia dealt the Ottoman Empire a crushing defeat at Sisak. |
| 1595 | | Erdődy left office. |

== 17th century ==
| Year | Date | Event |
|---|---|---|
| 1608 | 19 November | Erdődy again became Ban. |
| 1608 | 19 November | Rudolf was deposed from the throne of Croatia by his brother Matthias, Holy Roman Emperor. |
| 1615 | 16 February | Erdődy left office. |
| 1618 | 1 July | Matthias was succeeded by his cousin Ferdinand II, Holy Roman Emperor. |
| 1622 | 15 November | Juraj V Zrinski was appointed Ban. |
| 1626 | 28 December | Zrinski was poisoned. |
| 1637 | 15 February | Ferdinand II died. He was succeeded by his son Ferdinand III, Holy Roman Emperor. |
| 1647 | 27 December | Nikola Zrinski was appointed Ban of Croatia. |
| 1657 | 2 April | Ferdinand III died. He was succeeded by his son Leopold I, Holy Roman Emperor. |
| 1663 | September | Austro-Turkish War (1663–1664): An Ottoman army invaded Hungary. |
| 1664 | 5 June | Siege of Novi Zrin (1664): Ottoman forces started to besiege the fortress in Međimurje County. |
| 1664 | 1 August | Battle of Saint Gotthard (1664) : Ottoman forces were dealt a decisive defeat by the League of the Rhine at Szentgotthárd. |
| 1664 | 10 August | Austro-Turkish War (1663–1664): The Peace of Vasvár was signed, ending hostilities for twenty years and ceding some Croatian land to the Ottoman Empire. |
| 1664 | 18 November | Nikola Zrinski died. |
| 1665 | 24 January | Petar Zrinski was appointed Ban. |
| 1671 | 30 April | Zrinski was executed for high treason in connection with the Magnate conspiracy. |
| 1671 | | Miklós Erdődy was appointed Ban of Croatia. |
| 1693 | | Erdődy died. |

== 18th century ==
| Year | Date | Event |
|---|---|---|
| 1704 | 24 January | János Pálffy was appointed Ban. |
| 1705 | 5 May | Leopold died. He was succeeded as king by his son Joseph I, Holy Roman Emperor. |
| 1711 | 17 April | Joseph died of smallpox. He was succeeded by his younger brother Charles VI, Holy Roman Emperor. |
| 1713 | 9 April | Charles issued the Pragmatic Sanction of 1713, which made it possible for women to inherit the Habsburg throne. |
| 1732 | 17 February | Pálffy left office. |
| 1740 | 20 October | Charles died. He was succeeded by his daughter, Queen Maria Theresa. |
| 1743 | 16 March | Károly József Batthyány became Ban. |
| 1756 | | The capital was moved from Zagreb to Varaždin. |
| 1756 | 6 July | Batthyány left office. |
| 1758 | | Arithmetika Horvatzka, Croatia's first arithmetic textbook is published in Zagreb by Mihalj Šilobod Bolšić (1724–1787). |
| 1776 | | A fire destroyed two-thirds of Varaždin. The Croatian capital moved back to Zagreb. |
| 1780 | 29 November | Maria Theresa died. Her son Joseph II, Holy Roman Emperor became King of Croatia. |
| 1790 | 20 February | Joseph died. He was succeeded by his younger brother Leopold II, Holy Roman Emperor. |
| 1792 | 1 March | Leopold died. He was succeeded by his son Francis II, Holy Roman Emperor. |

== 19th century ==
| Year | Date | Event |
|---|---|---|
| 1804 | 11 August | Francis established the Austrian Empire on the territories of the Habsburg monarchy. |
| 1806 | | Ignaz Gyulai was appointed Ban of Croatia. |
| 1831 | 11 November | Gyulai died. |
| 1832 | 10 February | Franjo Vlašić was appointed Ban. |
| 1835 | 2 March | Francis died of fever. He was succeeded as king by his son Ferdinand I of Austria. |
| 1840 | 16 May | Vlašić died. He was succeeded as acting Ban by Juraj Haulik. |
| 1845 | 29 July | Thirteen protesters, the July victims, were killed in Zagreb while protesting a flawed local election. |
| 1848 | 15 March | Hungarian Revolution of 1848: Revolutionaries read the 12 points of the Hungarian Revolutionaries of 1848 before a crowd in Buda. The crowd marched on the Imperial Governing Council and forced Ferdinand's representatives to sign them. |
| 1848 | 23 March | Josip Jelačić was appointed Ban. |
| 1848 | 11 April | Ferdinand signed the April Laws, devolving some powers to the Kingdom of Hungary. |
| 1848 | 19 April | The Sabor proclaimed the union of the Croatian provinces, their secession from the Kingdom of Hungary within the Austrian Empire, and the abolition of serfdom. It further declared the equality of people in Croatia. |
| 1848 | 29 September | Battle of Pákozd: A revolutionary army seeking Hungarian independence from Austria forced a Croatian retreat. |
| 1848 | 2 December | Hungarian Revolution of 1848: Ferdinand abdicated in favor of his nephew Franz Joseph I of Austria. |
| 1859 | 20 May | Jelačić died. |
| 1859 | 28 July | Johann Baptist Coronini-Cronberg was appointed Ban. |
| 1860 | 19 June | Josip Šokčević was appointed Ban. |
| 1866 | 14 June | Austro-Prussian War: Prussia declared war on Austria. |
| 1866 | 3 July | Battle of Königgrätz: Austria suffered a devastating defeat at Prussian hands at Königgrätz. |
| 1866 | 23 August | Austro-Prussian War: The Peace of Prague (1866) was signed, ending the war. |
| 1867 | 30 March | The Austro-Hungarian Compromise of 1867 was ratified, establishing the dual monarchy of Austria-Hungary which devolved almost all power to the Austrian and Hungarian kingdoms respectively. |
| 1867 | 27 June | Levin Rauch was appointed acting Ban. |
| 1867 | 20 October | A new electoral law reduced the size of the Sabor to sixty-six seats. |
| 1868 | | The Croatian–Hungarian Settlement was signed by the Hungarian Parliament and the Croatian Sabor. The Kingdom of Slavonia was incorporated into Croatia; the Kingdom of Croatia-Slavonia was established as an autonomous state within Hungary. |
| 1871 | 26 January | Koloman Bedeković succeeded Rauch as Ban. |
| 1871 | 8 October | Rakovica Revolt: Politician Eugen Kvaternik declared the establishment of an independent Croatian government, seated at Rakovica and incorporating the Croatian Military Frontier. |
| 1871 | 11 October | Rakovica Revolt: Kvaternik was executed. |
| 1873 | 20 September | Ivan Mažuranić became Ban. |
| 1880 | 21 February | Ladislav Pejačević succeeded Mažuranić as Ban. |
| 1881 | | The Croatian Military Frontier was incorporated into Croatia-Slavonia. |
| 1883 | 19 April | Croatian parliamentary by-election, 1883: The first day of elections to the Sabor from the former territories of the Croatian Military Frontier was held. |
| 1883 | 21 April | Croatian parliamentary by-election, 1883: The last day of elections was held. The government list won a majority of available seats. |
| 1883 | 4 September | Hermann von Ramberg succeeded Pejačević as Ban. |
| 1883 | 1 December | Ramberg was dismissed. |
| 1883 | 4 December | Károly Khuen-Héderváry became Ban. |
| 1884 | 16 September | Croatian parliamentary election, 1884: The first day of balloting was held. |
| 1884 | 19 September | Croatian parliamentary election, 1884: The last day of balloting was held. The People's Party won a majority of seats in the Sabor. |
| 1895 | 16 October | 1895 visit of Emperor Franz Joseph to Zagreb: Student protesters burned the Hungarian flag in Ban Jelačić Square. |
| 1897 | 19 May | Croatian parliamentary election, 1897: The first day of elections was held. |
| 1897 | 22 May | Croatian parliamentary election, 1897: The last day of balloting was held. The People's Party won a majority of seats in the Sabor. |

== 20th century ==
| Year | Date | Event |
|---|---|---|
| 1903 | 27 June | Ban Khuen-Héderváry resigned to become the Hungarian Prime Minister. |
| 1903 | | Teodor Pejačević was appointed Ban. |
| 1907 | 26 June | Aleksandar Rakodczay became Ban. |
| 1908 | 8 January | Pavao Rauch was appointed Ban. |
| 1908 | 27 February | Croatian parliamentary election, 1908: The first day of balloting was held. |
| 1908 | 28 February | Croatian parliamentary election, 1908: The second day of balloting was held. The Croat-Serb Coalition won a majority of seats in the Sabor. |
| 1908 | 12 March | Rauch dissolved the Sabor. |
| 1910 | 5 February | Rauch was dismissed and replaced as Ban by Nikola Tomašić. |
| 1910 | 28 October | Croatian parliamentary election, 1910: The Croat-Serb Coalition won a plurality of seats in the Sabor. |
| 1912 | 19 January | Slavko Cuvaj was appointed Ban. |
| 1913 | 21 July | Ivan Škrlec was appointed Ban. |
| 1913 | 16 December | Croatian parliamentary election, 1913: The first day of balloting was held. |
| 1913 | 17 December | Croatian parliamentary election, 1913: The second day of balloting was held. The Croat-Serb Coalition won a majority of seats in the Sabor. |
| 1914 | 28 June | Assassination of Archduke Franz Ferdinand of Austria: Archduke Franz Ferdinand of Austria was assassinated by Gavrilo Princip of the Bosnian separatist group Young Bosnia. |
| 1914 | 23 July | July Crisis: Austria-Hungary issued an ultimatum to Serbia, demanding, among other things, the right to participate in the investigation into the assassination of Franz Ferdinand, which Serbia refused. |
| 1914 | 28 July | World War I: Austria-Hungary declared war on Serbia. |
| 1914 | 30 July | World War I: Russia mobilized its army to defend Serbia. |
| 1915 | | Škrlec reconvened the Sabor. |
| 1915 | 26 April | World War I: The secret Treaty of London (1915) was signed, under which Russia, France and the United Kingdom recognized Italian territorial claims (including some in Croatia) in return for Italy's joining the war on the side of the Triple Entente. |
| 1916 | 21 November | Franz Joseph I of Austria died. He was succeeded as king by his grandnephew Charles I of Austria. |
| 1917 | 29 June | Skerlecz resigned. Antun Mihalović became Ban. |
| 1918 | 29 October | The Sabor dissolved Croatia's union with Austria-Hungary and incorporated the Kingdom of Dalmatia into the new State of Slovenes, Croats and Serbs. |
| 1918 | 1 December | The State of Slovenes, Croats and Serbs joined with Serbia to form the new Kingdom of Yugoslavia under King Peter I of Serbia. |
| 1919 | 20 January | Mihalović left office. |
| 1920 | 12 November | Yugoslavia signed the Treaty of Rapallo (1920), acceding to Italian claims on some of its territory. |
| 1920 | 28 November | Kingdom of Serbs, Croats and Slovenes Constitutional Assembly election, 1920: The Democratic Party, People's Radical Party and Communist Party were the three most successful parties by number of seats received in the Assembly. |
| 1920 | 29 December | The government issued a decree banning Communist propaganda and ordering the dissolution of all Communist organizations until approval of the Constitution. |
| 1921 | 28 June | The Vidovdan Constitution, which abolished the traditional divisions of the region in favor of thirty-three oblasts ruled by royal appointees, was approved. |
| 1921 | 16 August | Peter died. He was succeeded as king by his son Alexander I of Yugoslavia. |
| 1923 | 18 March | Kingdom of Serbs, Croats and Slovenes parliamentary election, 1923: The People's Radical Party won a plurality of seats in Parliament. |
| 1925 | 8 February | Kingdom of Serbs, Croats and Slovenes parliamentary election, 1925: The People's Radical Party won a plurality of seats in Parliament. |
| 1927 | 11 September | Kingdom of Serbs, Croats and Slovenes parliamentary election, 1927: The People's Radical Party won a plurality of seats in Parliament. |
| 1928 | 20 June | Puniša Račić of the People's Radical Party shot five members of the Croatian Peasant Party (HSS) during a session of Parliament. Two were killed instantly, and Party leader Stjepan Radić was fatally wounded. |
| 1928 | 8 August | Radić died. |
| 1929 | 6 January | 6 January Dictatorship: Alexander issued a decree dissolving Parliament and abolishing the Constitution. |
| 1929 | 3 October | Alexander replaced the thirty-three oblasts with nine banovinas. |
| 1931 | 3 September | 6 January Dictatorship: Alexander issued the 1931 Yugoslav Constitution, ending the dictatorship. |
| 1934 | 9 October | Alexander was assassinated by a Bulgarian mercenary, Vlado Chernozemski, with the Internal Macedonian Revolutionary Organization; Chernozemski had been contracted by the Ustaše, which was formed in 1929. Alexander was succeeded by his eleven-year-old son, Peter, with his cousin, Prince Paul, leading a regency council of three. |
| 1935 | 5 May | Yugoslavian parliamentary election, 1935: The Yugoslav National Party won a majority of seats in Parliament. |
| 1938 | 11 December | Yugoslavian parliamentary election, 1938: The Yugoslav Radical Union won a majority of seats in Parliament. |
| 1939 | 23 August | The Cvetković–Maček Agreement was approved, establishing the autonomous Banovina of Croatia with an elected Sabor and a crown-appointed Ban. |
| 1939 | 26 August | Ivan Šubašić was appointed Ban of Croatia. |
| 1941 | 25 March | World War II: Prince Paul signed the Tripartite Pact, pledging support to the Axis powers. |
| 1941 | 27 March | Yugoslav military coup of 27 March 1941: A military coup overthrew the Regency and declared Peter II to be of age. |
| 1941 | 6 April | World War II in Yugoslavia begins |
| 1941 | 6 April | Invasion of Yugoslavia: Germany opened an invasion of Yugoslavia with an air attack on **Belgrade**. |
| 1941 | 10 April | Independent State of Croatia declared by Ante Pavelić of the Ustaše. |
| 1941 | 13 May | Croatia signed a treaty establishing its borders with Germany. |
| 1941 | 18 May | Prince Aimone, Duke of Aosta was crowned King Tomislav II of Croatia by the Italian King Victor Emmanuel III of Italy. |
| 1941 | 19 May | Croatia ceded land, including most of Dalmatia, to Italy by signing the treaty of Rapallo. |
| 1941 | 7 June | Croatia's borders with Serbia were established. |
| 1941 | 22 June | Operation Barbarossa: Germany launched an invasion of the Soviet Union. |
| 1941 | 4 July | A call by the Communist Party of Yugoslavia to resist the Ustaše government marked the birth of the Yugoslav Partisans. |
| 1941 | August | Glina massacre: The Ustaše killed several hundred Serb civilians in a church in Glina. |
| 1941 | 27 October | Croatia's borders with Montenegro were established. |
| 1942 | 5 October | Operation Alfa: Italian and Chetnik forces attacked the Partisan-held town of Prozor. |
| 1942 | 10 October | Operation Alfa: The battle ended in a Partisan defeat. |
| 1942 | 26 November | The Anti-Fascist Council of the People's Liberation of Yugoslavia (AVNOJ) was established as the political organization of the Yugoslav Partisans. |
| 1943 | 15 May | Battle of the Sutjeska: Axis troops surrounded the main Partisan force on the east bank of the Sutjeska river in Bosnia. |
| 1943 | 14 June | The National Anti-Fascist Council of the People's Liberation of Croatia (ZAVNOH), composed of Croatian members of the AVNOJ, held its first session and declared Vladimir Nazor President. |
| 1943 | 16 June | Battle of the Sutjeska: The Partisans escaped across the Sutjeska. |
| 1943 | 25 July | Italian King Victor Emmanuel III of Italy dismissed his Prime Minister Benito Mussolini. |
| 1943 | 31 July | Tomislav abdicated on the orders of the Italian King Victor Emmanuel III of Italy. |
| 1943 | 8 September | World War II: An armistice between Italy and Allied armed forces was published, voiding Croatia's territorial concessions of 1941 and the Treaty of Rapallo (1920). |
| 1943 | 15 November | Operation Delphin: Croatian forces undertook a campaign to capture several islands in the Adriatic Sea off the cost of central Dalmatia. |
| 1943 | 21 November | The second session of the AVNOJ established the National Committee for the Liberation of Yugoslavia, the government-in-waiting of a federal, democratic Yugoslavia under Prime Minister Josip Broz Tito. |
| 1943 | 1 December | Operation Delphin: The operation concluded successfully. |
| 1944 | 9 May | The Federal State of Croatia was established at the third session of the ZAVNOH. |
| 1944 | 13 May | The Department for the Protection of the People (OZNA) was established under Aleksandar Ranković. |
| 1944 | 25 May | Raid on Drvar: German paratroopers attacked Partisan headquarters near Drvar. Tito escaped. |
| 1944 | 16 June | Tito and Šubašić signed the Treaty of Vis, which provided for a coalition of royalists and Communists in the government of the future Yugoslavia. |
| 1945 | 30 March | Battle on Lijevče field: Croatian and Chetnik forces met at Lijevče. |
| 1945 | 8 April | Battle on Lijevče field: The Chetniks surrendered. |
| 1945 | 6 May | Pavelić fled the country. |
| 1945 | 8 May | World War II in Yugoslavia formally ends with the German Instrument of Surrender, but fighting continues. |
| 1945 | 14 May | Battle of Poljana: Retreating Axis troops were forced to surrender to the Partisans. |
| 1945 | 15 May | Bleiburg repatriations: After the retreating Axis column is stopped at Bleiburg, Austria, and forced by the British Army to surrender instead to the Yugoslav Partisans, the Yugoslav Partisans commit thousands of reprisals against the remnants of the Ustaše and the civilians who fled Croatia alongside them, as well as some Slovene, Serb, and Montenegrin collaborators. |
| 1945 | 10 June | Tito agreed to the separation of Allied and Partisan forces at the Morgan Line. |
| 1945 | 21 August | ZAVNOH declared itself the People's Parliament of Croatia. |
| 1945 | 25 August | The People's Parliament elected Nazor President of Croatia. |
| 1945 | October | The royalists in the Yugoslavian government resigned. |
| 1945 | 11 November | The Communist Party won an overwhelming majority of votes to the Constituent Assembly of Yugoslavia. |
| 1945 | 29 November | The Federal People's Republic of Yugoslavia was declared and King Peter deposed. |
| 1946 | 31 January | The 1946 Yugoslav Constitution came into force. |
| 1947 | 10 February | The Paris Peace Treaties, 1947 were signed, solidifying Yugoslavia's border with Italy and establishing the Free Territory of Trieste, half of which was to be under Yugoslavian military occupation. |
| 1947 | September | The Cominform was established. |
| 1948 | May | Tito–Stalin split: Croatian Communist Party member Andrija Hebrang was arrested after supporting the Soviet Union in a dispute with Yugoslavia. |
| 1948 | 28 June | Tito–Stalin split: Yugoslavia was expelled from the Cominform. |
| 1949 | 19 June | Nazor died. |
| 1950 | 26 June | Tito announced the introduction of workers' self-management in Yugoslavia. |
| 1953 | 13 January | The 1953 Yugoslav Constitution came into force. |
| 1953 | December | Vladimir Bakarić became President of Croatia. |
| 1963 | 7 April | The 1963 Yugoslav Constitution came into force. |
| 1967 | 13 March | Croatian Spring: The Declaration on the Status and Name of the Croatian Literary Language was published, demanding equal status for the Croatian language. |
| 1971 | 23 November | Croatian Spring: A student protest began in Zagreb. |
| 1971 | December | Croatian Spring: Tito forced Chair of the Croatian Communist Party Savka Dabčević-Kučar to resign. |
| 1974 | 21 February | The 1974 Yugoslav Constitution came into force, establishing a nine-member Presidency of Yugoslavia of which Tito was president for Life. |
| 1974 | April | Ivo Perišin became President of Croatia. |
| 1974 | 8 May | Perišin was succeeded by a rotating Croatian Presidency under the 1974 Yugoslav Constitution. |
| 1975 | 10 November | The Treaty of Osimo was signed, under which Italy and Yugoslavia were allowed to annex their respective occupation zones in Trieste. |
| 1980 | 4 May | Tito died. He was succeeded as President of the Presidency of Yugoslavia by the Macedonian Lazar Koliševski. |
| 1980 | 15 May | The Yugoslavian Presidency rotated to the Bosnian Cvijetin Mijatović. |
| 1981 | 15 May | The Yugoslavian Presidency rotated to the Slovenian Sergej Kraigher. |
| 1982 | 15 May | The Yugoslavian Presidency rotated to the Serbian Petar Stambolić. |
| 1983 | 15 May | The Yugoslavian Presidency rotated to the Croatian Mika Špiljak. |
| 1984 | 15 May | The Yugoslavian Presidency rotated to the Montenegrin Veselin Đuranović. |
| 1985 | 15 May | The Yugoslavian Presidency rotated to the Vojvodin Radovan Vlajković. |
| 1986 | 10 May | Ante Marković assumed the Presidency of Croatia. |
| 1986 | 15 May | The Yugoslavian Presidency rotated to the Kosovar Sinan Hasani. |
| 1987 | 15 May | The Yugoslavian Presidency rotated to the Macedonian Lazar Mojsov. |
| 1988 | 15 May | The Yugoslavian Presidency rotated to the Bosnian Raif Dizdarević. |
| 1989 | 15 May | The Yugoslavian Presidency rotated to the Slovenian Janez Drnovšek. |
| 1990 | 23 January | A Communist Party Congress ended the party's legal monopoly in Croatia. |
| 1990 | 22 April | Croatian parliamentary election, 1990: The first round of elections was held. |
| 1990 | 6 May | Croatian parliamentary election, 1990: The second round of elections was held. The Croatian Democratic Union (HDZ) won a majority of seats in all houses of Parliament. |
| 1990 | 15 May | The Yugoslavian Presidency rotated to the Serbian Borisav Jović. |
| 1990 | 30 May | The Serb Democratic Party (SDS) quit the Croatian Parliament. |
| 1990 | 25 July | A Serbian Assembly led by the SDS declared the establishment of the Serbian Autonomous Oblast of Kninska Krajina. |
| 1990 | 17 August | Log Revolution: Secessionist Serbs barricaded roads connecting Kninska Krajina to the rest of Croatia. |
| 1990 | October | Kninska Krajina was superseded by the larger Serbian Autonomous Oblast of Krajina. |
| 1990 | 22 December | The current Constitution of Croatia was ratified. Franjo Tuđman of the HDZ was made President of Croatia. |
| 1991 | 2 March | Pakrac clash: Croatian police arrested 180 Serb rebels who had occupied the town of Pakrac. |
| 1991 | 25 March | Presidents of Croatia and Serbia partake in the Milošević–Tuđman Karađorđevo meeting |
| 1991 | 31 March | Plitvice Lakes incident: Croatian police entered the Plitvice Lakes National Park to expel the secessionist forces of Krajina. Two combatants were killed. |
| 1991 | 1 April | Plitvice Lakes incident: The Yugoslavian army intervened to end the crisis. |
| 1991 | 1 May | Two Croatian police officers were taken prisoner by Serb secessionists in Borovo Selo. |
| 1991 | 2 May | The Croatian Parliament voted to hold a referendum on independence from Yugoslavia. |
| 1991 | 2 May | Borovo Selo killings: An attempt to free the captives resulted in a firefight between Serb rebels and police. Twelve Croatian policemen killed, with an unknown number of rebel casualties. |
| 1991 | 15 May | Serbia blocked the accession of Croatian Stjepan Mesić to the Yugoslavian Presidency. |
| 1991 | 19 May | Croatian independence referendum, 1991: Croatian independence from Yugoslavia was approved in referendum, with 93% support. |
| 1991 | 25 June | The Croatian Parliament declared Croatia independent from Yugoslavia. |
| 1991 | 25 June | Serb secessionists declared the Serbian Autonomous Oblast of Eastern Slavonia, Baranja and Western Syrmia. |
| 1991 | July | Battle of Osijek: JNA forces began shelling the town of Osijek. |
| 1991 | 15 July | Operation Coast-91: JNA and SAO Krajina forces attacked the town of Biograd but were rebuffed. |
| 1991 | August | Operation Opera Orientalis: Yugoslavian intelligence bombed Jewish cemeteries in an attempt to turn international opinion against Croatian independence. |
| 1991 | 1 August | Dalj massacre: Serb rebels killed twenty-eight police officers and eleven Croat civilians in Dalj. |
| 1991 | 12 August | Serb secessionists declared the Serbian Autonomous Oblast of Western Slavonia. |
| 1991 | 25 August | Battle of Vukovar: The Yugoslavian army and Serb militias laid siege to the town of Vukovar. |
| 1991 | 9 September | Battle of the Barracks: The Yugoslavian barracks in Sisak surrendered to Croatian forces. |
| 1991 | 16 September | Battle of Šibenik (1991): The Yugoslavian army attacked Croatian forces in Šibenik. |
| 1991 | 22 September | Battle of Šibenik (1991): Yugoslavian forces were made to retreat. |
| 1991 | 1 October | Siege of Dubrovnik: Yugoslavian forces surrounded Dubrovnik. |
| 1991 | 6 October | Operation Coast-91: A truce was agreed. |
| 1991 | 7 October | Bombing of Banski dvori: The Yugoslavian army bombed the government residence, the Banski dvori in Zagreb. |
| 1991 | 13 October | Široka Kula massacre: Serb forces killed thirty-four civilians. |
| 1991 | 16 October | Gospić massacre: A three-day massacre began during which Serb forces killed between twenty-three and one hundred civilians. |
| 1991 | 18 October | Lovas massacre: Serbs forced a group of Croat civilians to walk across a minefield, killing twenty-one. |
| 1991 | 21 October | Baćin massacre: Serb rebel forces killed some fifty-six civilians. |
| 1991 | 31 October | Operation Otkos 10: Croatian forces moved to block a Yugoslavian advance on Zagreb. |
| 1991 | 4 November | Operation Otkos 10: The operation concluded successfully. |
| 1991 | 10 November | Erdut massacre: Serb rebels executed the first ten of the thirty-seven Hungarian and Croat civilians they would eventually massacre in Erdut. |
| 1991 | 12 November | Saborsko massacre: Serb rebel forces killed twenty-nine civilians in Saborsko. |
| 1991 | 14 November | Battle of the Dalmatian channels: A Yugoslavian ship was sunk by the Croatian navy near Split. |
| 1991 | 16 November | Battle of the Dalmatian channels: The Yugoslavian blockade of Split was broken. |
| 1991 | 18 November | Battle of Vukovar: The last Croatian forces surrendered. |
| 1991 | 18 November | Škabrnja massacre: Serb forces took the town of Škabrnja and began a massacre which would eventually claim eighty-six lives. |
| 1991 | 18 November | Bosnian War: The Croatian Democratic Union of Bosnia and Herzegovina (HDZBiH) established Croatian Community of Herzeg-Bosnia at municipalities with majority of Croatian people on the territory of Bosnia and Herzegovina. |
| 1991 | 20 November | Vukovar massacre: Some 264 civilians, mostly Croats, were murdered by Serb militias near Vukovar. |
| 1991 | 12 December | Operation Orkan 91 The Croatian Army began an advance into Krajina. |
| 1991 | 12 December | Operation Whirlwind: The Croatian army attempted to cross the Kupa river against Krajina forces. |
| 1991 | 13 December | Voćin massacre: A Serb paramilitary group, the White Eagles, killed several dozen people before retreating from Voćin. |
| 1991 | 13 December | Operation Whirlwind: The Croatian advance was stopped. |
| 1991 | 16 December | Joševica massacre: Serb forces killed twenty-one civilians in Joševica. |
| 1991 | 19 December | Krajina declared independence from Croatia, proclaiming itself the Republic of Serbian Krajina. |
| 1991 | 21 December | Bruška massacre: Serb forces killed ten civilians in Bruška. |
| 1992 | 2 January | Operation Orkan 91: A ceasefire was negotiated. |
| 1992 | 2 January | Battle of Osijek: A ceasefire was negotiated. |
| 1992 | 26 February | Krajina invested SAO Eastern Slavonia, Baranja and Western Syrmia and Western Slavonia. |
| 1992 | 6 May | Bosnian War: The Graz agreement was drafted, delineating the demarcation between Herzeg-Bosnia and the Republika Srpska in Bosnia and Herzegovina. |
| 1992 | 26 May | Siege of Dubrovnik: Croatian forces broke the siege. |
| 1992 | June | Operation Vrbas '92: Military offensive of the Army of Republika Srpska against the HVO and ARBiH in Jajce. |
| 1992 | 14 June | Operation Corridor: The Army of Republika Srpska launched an offensive against the joint forces of Bosnia and Herzegovina, Croatia and Herzeg-Bosnia. |
| 1992 | 21 June | Miljevci plateau incident: Croatian forces captured some thirty square miles in a surprise attack on Krajina forces. |
| 1992 | 26 June | Operation Corridor: The operation ended with the successful linking of the two parts of Republika Srpska. |
| 1992 | 2 August | Croatian parliamentary election, 1992: The HDZ won a majority of seats in the Sabor. |
| 1992 | 2 August | Croatian presidential election, 1992: Tuđman was reelected with 57% of the vote. |
| 1992 | 12 August | Hrvoje Šarinić of the HDZ was elected prime minister. |
| 1992 | 18 October | Croat–Bosniak War: First armed clashes between the Croatian Defence Council (HVO) and the Army of the Republic of Bosnia and Herzegovina (ARBiH). |
| 1992 | 27 October | Operation Vrbas '92: The operation concluded with the conquest of Jajce. |
| 1993 | 22 January | Operation Maslenica: The Croatian army launched an offensive to reconquer Krajina territory in northern Dalmatia. |
| 1993 | 1 February | Operation Maslenica: The Croatian government halted the offensive. |
| 1993 | September | Operation Neretva '93: ARBiH forces attack the HVO in Herzegovina and central Bosnia. |
| 1993 | 9 September | Operation Medak Pocket: Croatian forces launched a southeastward offensive against Krajina towards the village of Medak. |
| 1993 | 17 September | Operation Medak Pocket: Croatia negotiated a ceasefire under international pressure. |
| 1994 | 23 February | Croat–Bosniak War: The war was effectively ended with a ceasefire. |
| 1994 | 18 March | Croat–Bosniak War: The Washington Agreement was signed, establishing the Federation of Bosnia and Herzegovina within Bosnia and Herzegovina. |
| 1994 | 29 November | Operation Winter '94: Croatian forces launched an offensive into western Bosnia and Herzegovina. |
| 1994 | 24 December | Operation Winter '94: The offensive ended to Croatian territorial advantage. |
| 1995 | 1 May | Operation Flash: The Croatian Army launched an offensive which would reconquer the territory of the former Western Slavonia in Krajina. |
| 1995 | 2 May | Zagreb rocket attacks: A two-day series of rocket attacks by Serb forces on Zagreb began which would kill seven civilians. |
| 1995 | 3 May | Operation Flash: The offensive came to a successful conclusion. |
| 1995 | 25 July | Operation Summer '95: Croatian forces launched a northward offensive from Bosnia and Herzegovina against Krajina forces. |
| 1995 | 30 July | Operation Summer '95: The operation ended to Croatian territorial advantage. |
| 1995 | 4 August | Operation Storm: One hundred and fifty thousand Croatian soldiers launched an offensive across a three hundred-mile front into Krajina. |
| 1995 | 9 August | Operation Storm: The operation concluded with the surrender of Krajina forces at Vojnić. |
| 1995 | 8 September | Operation Mistral 2: Croatian and Bosnia and Herzegovina forces attacked Republika Srpska forces in western Bosnia and Herzegovina. |
| 1995 | 15 September | Operation Mistral: The battle ended in a Republika Srpska defeat. |
| 1995 | 29 October | Croatian parliamentary election, 1995: The HDZ won a majority of seats in the Sabor. |
| 1995 | 7 November | Zlatko Mateša of the HDZ was elected prime minister. |
| 1995 | 12 November | The Erdut Agreement was signed by representatives of Croatia and Krajina, establishing a Joint Council of Municipalities in Eastern Slavonia, Baranja and Western Syrmia (1995-1998), which would guarantee Serb rights under the protection of the United Nations Transitional Authority for Eastern Slavonia, Baranja and Western Sirmium (UNTAES) and later under Croatian sovereignty. |
| 1995 | 14 December | Bosnian War: The Dayton Agreement was signed, establishing Bosnia and Herzegovina as an indivisible federation, with an alternating presidency, of the Federation of Bosnia and Herzegovina and the Republika Srpska. |
| 1996 | 15 January | The UNTAES mission began. |
| 1996 | 5 September | 1996 Ston–Slano earthquake: A strong M_{w}6.0 earthquake struck north of Dubrovnik. The worst of the damage occurred in the old town of Ston. There were no fatalities, but there was extensive damage to houses and cultural heritage. |
| 1997 | 15 June | Croatian presidential election, 1997: Tuđman was reelected with 61% of the vote. |
| 1998 | 15 January | The UNTAES mission ended. |
| 1999 | 26 November | Tuđman was declared incapacitated due to illness. Speaker of the Croatian Parliament Vlatko Pavletić became acting president. |
| 1999 | 10 December | Tuđman died of cancer. |
| 2000 | 3 January | Croatian parliamentary election, 2000: The Social Democratic Party of Croatia (SDP) won a plurality of seats in the Sabor. |
| 2000 | 24 January | Croatian presidential election, 2000: Mesić, running with the Croatian People's Party – Liberal Democrats (HNS), and Dražen Budiša of the Croatian Social Liberal Party (HSLS) qualified for the second round. |
| 2000 | 27 January | Ivica Račan of the SDP was elected prime minister, with the HSLS joining the SDP in coalition. |
| 2000 | 2 February | Zlatko Tomčić of the HSS was elected Speaker of the Croatian Parliament, replacing Pavletić in that role and as acting president. |
| 2000 | 7 February | Croatian presidential election, 2000: Mesić won with 56% of the vote. |

== 21st century ==
| Year | Date | Event |
|---|---|---|
| 2001 | 28 March | Chamber of Counties was abolished by Constitutional amendment. |
| 2003 | 23 November | Croatian parliamentary election, 2003: The HDZ won a plurality of seats in the Sabor. |
| 2003 | 23 December | Ivo Sanader of the HDZ was confirmed prime minister by the Sabor, with the Croatian Party of Pensioners (HSU) and Independent Democratic Serb Party (SDSS) joining the HDZ in coalition. |
| 2005 | 2 January | Croatian presidential election, 2005: Mesić, running as an independent, and Jadranka Kosor of the HDZ qualified for the second round. |
| 2005 | 16 January | Croatian presidential election, 2005: Mesić was reelected with 66% of the vote. |
| 2007 | 25 November | Croatian parliamentary election, 2007: The HDZ maintained its plurality in the Sabor. |
| 2007 | | Sanader was again confirmed prime minister, with the HSS and HSLS now supporting his candidacy. |
| 2009 | 1 April | Croatia joins NATO. |
| 2009 | 1 July | Sanader resigned. Deputy Prime Minister Kosor became prime minister. |
| 2009 | 3 July | 2009 flu pandemic in Croatia. First case confirmed with its origin from Australia. 526 people were infected and 22 people died from the Swine Flu. |
| 2009 | 27 December | Croatian presidential election, 2009–10: Ivo Josipović of the SDP and the independent Milan Bandić qualified for the second round. |
| 2010 | 10 January | Croatian presidential election, 2009–10: Josipović won with 60% of the vote. |
| 2011 | 4 December | Croatian parliamentary election, 2011: The SDP won a plurality of seats in the Sabor. |
| 2013 | 1 July | Croatia becomes the 28th member state of the European Union. |
| 2015 | 11 January | Croatian presidential election, 2014–15: Kolinda Grabar-Kitarović was voted to be the president of Croatia with 50,74% of the vote, becoming Croatia's first female president. (Note: Not counting Ema Derossi-Bjelajac who, as President of the Presidency of Croatia served as the first female head of state of SR Croatia.) |
| 2015 | 8 November | Croatian parliamentary election, 2015: The Patriotic Coalition won a plurality of seats in the Sabor, with Croatia is Growing coalition coming second and MOST third. |
| 2016 | 11 September | Croatian parliamentary election, 2016: The HDZ-led coalition won a plurality of seats in the Sabor. Andrej Plenković confirmed as the prime minister. |
| 2020 | 5 January | Croatian presidential election, 2019–20: Zoran Milanović (SDP) won with over 52% popular vote against Kolinda Grabar-Kitarović (HDZ). |
| 2020 | 25 February – 5 May 2023 | 2020 coronavirus outbreak in Croatia. At the time over 210 cases of COVID-19 confirmed. |
| 2020 | 22 March | 2020 Zagreb earthquake. At 6:24 AM, an 5.4 magnitude earthquake hit Zagreb and killed 1 teenager from the falling bricks. Its shock traveled few hundred kilometers. |
| 2020 | 5 July | Croatian parliamentary election, 2020: The HDZ-led coalition won a plurality of seats in the Sabor, with Andrej Plenković continuing to be the prime minister. |
| 2020 | 29 December | An earthquake hit near village of Petrinja at 12:19 PM with magnitude 6.2M_{L} killing 7 people. |
| 2021 | | GDP growth in Croatia increased by hitting record high 10.4% after contracting 8.1% in 2020. |
| 2022 | 12 July | European Union formally approved Croatia to become 20th Eurozone member by start of 2023. |
| 2022 | 5 September 2022 – 31 December 2023 | Croatia showed prices in both kunas and euros. |
| 2022 | 1 – 31 December | Euro packages available to buy in commercial banks, Financijska agencija, Hrvatska pošta d.d. and Croatian National Bank. |
| 2023 | 1 January | Croatia officially joined Eurozone as 20th member and Schengen area as 27th member. |
| 2023 | 1 – 14 January | Dual kuna/euro circulation was in effect. |
| 2024 | 17 April | Croatian parliamentary election, 2024: The HDZ-led coalition won a plurality of seats in the Sabor, with Andrej Plenković continuing to be the prime minister for the third consecutive time. |
| 2025 | 12 January | Croatian presidential election, 2024–25: Zoran Milanović (Independent) won with over 74% popular vote against Dragan Primorac (HDZ). |

== Map Timeline ==
| Map | Date | Name | Capital | Symbol |
|---|---|---|---|---|
| Map of the Byzantine Empire at AD 555. | 7th century | Byzantine Empire | Constantinople | |
| Duchy of Croatia at 850 | 7th century–925 | Duchy of Croatia | No permanent capital | |
| Map of the Kingdom of Croatia | 925–1102 | Kingdom of Croatia | No permanent capital | |
| Map of the Kingdom of Croatia and Dalmatia in 1260. | 1102–1526 | Kingdom of Croatia and Dalmatia (In personal union with Kingdom of Hungary) | No permanent capital | |
| (Shown in Red) | 1527–1868 | Kingdom of Croatia (In personal union with Kingdom of Hungary within Habsburg monarchy, Austrian Empire and Austria-Hungary) | No permanent capital | Flag of the Kingdom of Croatia (Habsburg). |
| (Shown in Red) | 1868–1918 | Kingdom of Croatia-Slavonia (Constituent kingdom within Austria-Hungary part of the Lands of the Crown of St Stephen) | Zagreb | Flag of Croatia-Slavonia. |
| Map of the State of Slovenes, Croats and Serbs. | 29 October 1918–1 December 1918 | State of Slovenes, Croats and Serbs | Zagreb | Flag of Slovenes, Croats and Serbs. |
| Map of the Kingdom of Slovenes, Croats and Serbs. | 1918–1929 | Kingdom of Serbs, Croats and Slovenes | Belgrade | Flag of the Kingdom of Serbs, Croats and Slovenes. |
| Map of the Kingdom of Yugoslavia in 1930. | 1929–1941 | Kingdom of Yugoslavia | Belgrade | Flag of Yugoslavia. |
| Map of the Independent State of Croatia in 1943. | 1941–1945 | Independent State of Croatia | Zagreb | Flag of the Independent State of Croatia. |
| Map of the Federal People's Republic of Yugoslavia. | 1945–1963 | Federal People's Republic of Yugoslavia | Belgrade | Flag of the Federal People's Republic of Yugoslavia. |
| Map of the Socialist Federal Republic of Yugoslavia in 1989. | 1963–1991 | Socialist Federal Republic of Yugoslavia | Belgrade | Flag of the Socialist Federal Republic of Yugoslavia |
| Map of Croatia. | 1991–Now | Republic of Croatia | Zagreb | Flag of Croatia. |

== See also ==
- Bans of Croatia
- Croatian art
- Croatian History Museum
- Croatian Military Frontier
- Croatian nobility
- Culture of Croatia
- History of Croatia
- History of Dalmatia
- History of Hungary
- History of Istria
- Hundred Years' Croatian–Ottoman War
- Kingdom of Dalmatia
- Kingdom of Slavonia
- Kings of Croatia
- List of noble families of Croatia
- List of rulers of Croatia
- Military history of Croatia
- Turkish Croatia
- Twelve noble tribes of Croatia

Cities in Croatia

- Timeline of Rijeka
- Timeline of Split
- Timeline of Zagreb

== Notes ==
| Region | **until** **1918** | **1918–** **1929** | **1929–** **1945** | **1941–** **1945** | **1945–** **1946** | **1946–** **1963** | **1963–** **1992** | **1992–** **2003** | **2003–** **2006** | **2006–** **2008** | **since** **2008** |
|---|---|---|---|---|---|---|---|---|---|---|---|
| **Slovenia** | Part of Austria-Hungary including the Bay of Kotor See also: Kingdom of Croatia-Slavonia (1868–1918) Kingdom of Dalmatia (1815–1918) Condominium of Bosnia and Herzegovina (1878–1918) | **State of Slovenes, Croats and Serbs** (1918) **Kingdom of Serbs,** **Croats and Slovenes** (1918–1929) **Kingdom of Yugoslavia** (1929–1943) See also: Republic of Prekmurje (1919) Banat, Bačka and Baranja (1918–1919) Free State of Fiume (1920–1924) (1924–1945) Italian province of Zadar (1920–1947) | | Annexed by Italy, Germany, and Hungary^{a} | **Democratic Federal Yugoslavia** (1943–1945) **Federal People's Republic of Yugoslavia** (1945–1963) **Socialist Federal Republic of Yugoslavia** (1963–1992) Consisted of the Socialist Republics of: Slovenia (1945–1991); Croatia (1945–1991); Bosnia and Herzegovina (1945–1992) Serbia (1945–1992) (included the autonomous provinces of Vojvodina and Kosovo) Montenegro (1945–1992); Macedonia (1945–1991) See also: Free Territory of Trieste (1947–1954)^{h} | | | **Republic of Slovenia**; Ten-Day War | | | |
| **Dalmatia** | Part of Austria-Hungary including the Bay of Kotor See also: Kingdom of Croatia-Slavonia (1868–1918) Kingdom of Dalmatia (1815–1918) Condominium of Bosnia and Herzegovina (1878–1918) | **State of Slovenes, Croats and Serbs** (1918) **Kingdom of Serbs,** **Croats and Slovenes** (1918–1929) **Kingdom of Yugoslavia** (1929–1943) See also: Republic of Prekmurje (1919) Banat, Bačka and Baranja (1918–1919) Free State of Fiume (1920–1924) (1924–1945) Italian province of Zadar (1920–1947) | | **Independent State of Croatia** (1941–1945) Puppet state of Germany. Parts annexed by Italy. Međimurje and Baranja annexed by Hungary. | **Democratic Federal Yugoslavia** (1943–1945) **Federal People's Republic of Yugoslavia** (1945–1963) **Socialist Federal Republic of Yugoslavia** (1963–1992) Consisted of the Socialist Republics of: Slovenia (1945–1991); Croatia (1945–1991); Bosnia and Herzegovina (1945–1992) Serbia (1945–1992) (included the autonomous provinces of Vojvodina and Kosovo) Montenegro (1945–1992); Macedonia (1945–1991) See also: Free Territory of Trieste (1947–1954)^{h} | | | **Republic of Croatia**^{b} Croatian War of Independence | | | |
| **Slavonia** | Part of Austria-Hungary including the Bay of Kotor See also: Kingdom of Croatia-Slavonia (1868–1918) Kingdom of Dalmatia (1815–1918) Condominium of Bosnia and Herzegovina (1878–1918) | **State of Slovenes, Croats and Serbs** (1918) **Kingdom of Serbs,** **Croats and Slovenes** (1918–1929) **Kingdom of Yugoslavia** (1929–1943) See also: Republic of Prekmurje (1919) Banat, Bačka and Baranja (1918–1919) Free State of Fiume (1920–1924) (1924–1945) Italian province of Zadar (1920–1947) | | **Independent State of Croatia** (1941–1945) Puppet state of Germany. Parts annexed by Italy. Međimurje and Baranja annexed by Hungary. | **Democratic Federal Yugoslavia** (1943–1945) **Federal People's Republic of Yugoslavia** (1945–1963) **Socialist Federal Republic of Yugoslavia** (1963–1992) Consisted of the Socialist Republics of: Slovenia (1945–1991); Croatia (1945–1991); Bosnia and Herzegovina (1945–1992) Serbia (1945–1992) (included the autonomous provinces of Vojvodina and Kosovo) Montenegro (1945–1992); Macedonia (1945–1991) See also: Free Territory of Trieste (1947–1954)^{h} | | | **Republic of Croatia**^{b} Croatian War of Independence | | | |
| **Croatia** | Part of Austria-Hungary including the Bay of Kotor See also: Kingdom of Croatia-Slavonia (1868–1918) Kingdom of Dalmatia (1815–1918) Condominium of Bosnia and Herzegovina (1878–1918) | **State of Slovenes, Croats and Serbs** (1918) **Kingdom of Serbs,** **Croats and Slovenes** (1918–1929) **Kingdom of Yugoslavia** (1929–1943) See also: Republic of Prekmurje (1919) Banat, Bačka and Baranja (1918–1919) Free State of Fiume (1920–1924) (1924–1945) Italian province of Zadar (1920–1947) | | **Independent State of Croatia** (1941–1945) Puppet state of Germany. Parts annexed by Italy. Međimurje and Baranja annexed by Hungary. | **Democratic Federal Yugoslavia** (1943–1945) **Federal People's Republic of Yugoslavia** (1945–1963) **Socialist Federal Republic of Yugoslavia** (1963–1992) Consisted of the Socialist Republics of: Slovenia (1945–1991); Croatia (1945–1991); Bosnia and Herzegovina (1945–1992) Serbia (1945–1992) (included the autonomous provinces of Vojvodina and Kosovo) Montenegro (1945–1992); Macedonia (1945–1991) See also: Free Territory of Trieste (1947–1954)^{h} | | | **Republic of Croatia**^{b} Croatian War of Independence | | | |
| **Bosnia** | Part of Austria-Hungary including the Bay of Kotor See also: Kingdom of Croatia-Slavonia (1868–1918) Kingdom of Dalmatia (1815–1918) Condominium of Bosnia and Herzegovina (1878–1918) | **State of Slovenes, Croats and Serbs** (1918) **Kingdom of Serbs,** **Croats and Slovenes** (1918–1929) **Kingdom of Yugoslavia** (1929–1943) See also: Republic of Prekmurje (1919) Banat, Bačka and Baranja (1918–1919) Free State of Fiume (1920–1924) (1924–1945) Italian province of Zadar (1920–1947) | | **Independent State of Croatia** (1941–1945) Puppet state of Germany. Parts annexed by Italy. Međimurje and Baranja annexed by Hungary. | **Democratic Federal Yugoslavia** (1943–1945) **Federal People's Republic of Yugoslavia** (1945–1963) **Socialist Federal Republic of Yugoslavia** (1963–1992) Consisted of the Socialist Republics of: Slovenia (1945–1991); Croatia (1945–1991); Bosnia and Herzegovina (1945–1992) Serbia (1945–1992) (included the autonomous provinces of Vojvodina and Kosovo) Montenegro (1945–1992); Macedonia (1945–1991) See also: Free Territory of Trieste (1947–1954)^{h} | | | **Bosnia and Herzegovina**^{c} Bosnian War Consists of the Federation of Bosnia and Herzegovina (since 1995), Republika Srpska (since 1995), and Brčko District (since 2000). | | | |
| **Herzegovina** | Part of Austria-Hungary including the Bay of Kotor See also: Kingdom of Croatia-Slavonia (1868–1918) Kingdom of Dalmatia (1815–1918) Condominium of Bosnia and Herzegovina (1878–1918) | **State of Slovenes, Croats and Serbs** (1918) **Kingdom of Serbs,** **Croats and Slovenes** (1918–1929) **Kingdom of Yugoslavia** (1929–1943) See also: Republic of Prekmurje (1919) Banat, Bačka and Baranja (1918–1919) Free State of Fiume (1920–1924) (1924–1945) Italian province of Zadar (1920–1947) | | **Independent State of Croatia** (1941–1945) Puppet state of Germany. Parts annexed by Italy. Međimurje and Baranja annexed by Hungary. | **Democratic Federal Yugoslavia** (1943–1945) **Federal People's Republic of Yugoslavia** (1945–1963) **Socialist Federal Republic of Yugoslavia** (1963–1992) Consisted of the Socialist Republics of: Slovenia (1945–1991); Croatia (1945–1991); Bosnia and Herzegovina (1945–1992) Serbia (1945–1992) (included the autonomous provinces of Vojvodina and Kosovo) Montenegro (1945–1992); Macedonia (1945–1991) See also: Free Territory of Trieste (1947–1954)^{h} | | | **Bosnia and Herzegovina**^{c} Bosnian War Consists of the Federation of Bosnia and Herzegovina (since 1995), Republika Srpska (since 1995), and Brčko District (since 2000). | | | |
| **Vojvodina** | Part of the Délvidék region of Hungary | **State of Slovenes, Croats and Serbs** (1918) **Kingdom of Serbs,** **Croats and Slovenes** (1918–1929) **Kingdom of Yugoslavia** (1929–1943) See also: Republic of Prekmurje (1919) Banat, Bačka and Baranja (1918–1919) Free State of Fiume (1920–1924) (1924–1945) Italian province of Zadar (1920–1947) | | Autonomous Banat^{d} (part of the German; Territory of the Military Commander in Serbia) | **Democratic Federal Yugoslavia** (1943–1945) **Federal People's Republic of Yugoslavia** (1945–1963) **Socialist Federal Republic of Yugoslavia** (1963–1992) Consisted of the Socialist Republics of: Slovenia (1945–1991); Croatia (1945–1991); Bosnia and Herzegovina (1945–1992) Serbia (1945–1992) (included the autonomous provinces of Vojvodina and Kosovo) Montenegro (1945–1992); Macedonia (1945–1991) See also: Free Territory of Trieste (1947–1954)^{h} | | | **Federal Republic of Yugoslavia** Consisted of the Republic of Serbia (1992–2006) and Republic of Montenegro (1992–2006) Included Kosovo and Metohija, under UN administration, without control since 1999 | **State Union of Serbia and Montenegro** Included Kosovo, under UN administration | **Republic of Serbia** Included the autonomous provinces of Vojvodina and Kosovo and Metohija under UN administration | **Republic of Serbia** Includes the autonomous province of Vojvodina; Kosovo claim |
| **Central Serbia** | **Kingdom of Serbia** (1882–1918) | **State of Slovenes, Croats and Serbs** (1918) **Kingdom of Serbs,** **Croats and Slovenes** (1918–1929) **Kingdom of Yugoslavia** (1929–1943) See also: Republic of Prekmurje (1919) Banat, Bačka and Baranja (1918–1919) Free State of Fiume (1920–1924) (1924–1945) Italian province of Zadar (1920–1947) | | Territory of the Military Commander in Serbia (1941–1944) ^{e} | **Democratic Federal Yugoslavia** (1943–1945) **Federal People's Republic of Yugoslavia** (1945–1963) **Socialist Federal Republic of Yugoslavia** (1963–1992) Consisted of the Socialist Republics of: Slovenia (1945–1991); Croatia (1945–1991); Bosnia and Herzegovina (1945–1992) Serbia (1945–1992) (included the autonomous provinces of Vojvodina and Kosovo) Montenegro (1945–1992); Macedonia (1945–1991) See also: Free Territory of Trieste (1947–1954)^{h} | | | **Federal Republic of Yugoslavia** Consisted of the Republic of Serbia (1992–2006) and Republic of Montenegro (1992–2006) Included Kosovo and Metohija, under UN administration, without control since 1999 | **State Union of Serbia and Montenegro** Included Kosovo, under UN administration | **Republic of Serbia** Included the autonomous provinces of Vojvodina and Kosovo and Metohija under UN administration | **Republic of Serbia** Includes the autonomous province of Vojvodina; Kosovo claim |
| **Kosovo** | Part of the Kingdom of Serbia (1912–1918) | **State of Slovenes, Croats and Serbs** (1918) **Kingdom of Serbs,** **Croats and Slovenes** (1918–1929) **Kingdom of Yugoslavia** (1929–1943) See also: Republic of Prekmurje (1919) Banat, Bačka and Baranja (1918–1919) Free State of Fiume (1920–1924) (1924–1945) Italian province of Zadar (1920–1947) | | Mostly annexed by Italian Albania (1941–1944) along with western Macedonia and south-eastern Montenegro | **Democratic Federal Yugoslavia** (1943–1945) **Federal People's Republic of Yugoslavia** (1945–1963) **Socialist Federal Republic of Yugoslavia** (1963–1992) Consisted of the Socialist Republics of: Slovenia (1945–1991); Croatia (1945–1991); Bosnia and Herzegovina (1945–1992) Serbia (1945–1992) (included the autonomous provinces of Vojvodina and Kosovo) Montenegro (1945–1992); Macedonia (1945–1991) See also: Free Territory of Trieste (1947–1954)^{h} | | | **Federal Republic of Yugoslavia** Consisted of the Republic of Serbia (1992–2006) and Republic of Montenegro (1992–2006) Included Kosovo and Metohija, under UN administration, without control since 1999 | **State Union of Serbia and Montenegro** Included Kosovo, under UN administration | **Republic of Serbia** Included the autonomous provinces of Vojvodina and Kosovo and Metohija under UN administration | **Republic of Kosovo** |
| **Metohija** | **Kingdom of Montenegro** (1910–1918) Metohija controlled by Austria-Hungary 1915–1918 | **State of Slovenes, Croats and Serbs** (1918) **Kingdom of Serbs,** **Croats and Slovenes** (1918–1929) **Kingdom of Yugoslavia** (1929–1943) See also: Republic of Prekmurje (1919) Banat, Bačka and Baranja (1918–1919) Free State of Fiume (1920–1924) (1924–1945) Italian province of Zadar (1920–1947) | | Mostly annexed by Italian Albania (1941–1944) along with western Macedonia and south-eastern Montenegro | **Democratic Federal Yugoslavia** (1943–1945) **Federal People's Republic of Yugoslavia** (1945–1963) **Socialist Federal Republic of Yugoslavia** (1963–1992) Consisted of the Socialist Republics of: Slovenia (1945–1991); Croatia (1945–1991); Bosnia and Herzegovina (1945–1992) Serbia (1945–1992) (included the autonomous provinces of Vojvodina and Kosovo) Montenegro (1945–1992); Macedonia (1945–1991) See also: Free Territory of Trieste (1947–1954)^{h} | | | **Federal Republic of Yugoslavia** Consisted of the Republic of Serbia (1992–2006) and Republic of Montenegro (1992–2006) Included Kosovo and Metohija, under UN administration, without control since 1999 | **State Union of Serbia and Montenegro** Included Kosovo, under UN administration | **Republic of Serbia** Included the autonomous provinces of Vojvodina and Kosovo and Metohija under UN administration | **Republic of Kosovo** |
| **Montenegro and Brda** | **Kingdom of Montenegro** (1910–1918) Metohija controlled by Austria-Hungary 1915–1918 | **State of Slovenes, Croats and Serbs** (1918) **Kingdom of Serbs,** **Croats and Slovenes** (1918–1929) **Kingdom of Yugoslavia** (1929–1943) See also: Republic of Prekmurje (1919) Banat, Bačka and Baranja (1918–1919) Free State of Fiume (1920–1924) (1924–1945) Italian province of Zadar (1920–1947) | | Protectorate of Montenegro^{f} (1941–1944) | **Democratic Federal Yugoslavia** (1943–1945) **Federal People's Republic of Yugoslavia** (1945–1963) **Socialist Federal Republic of Yugoslavia** (1963–1992) Consisted of the Socialist Republics of: Slovenia (1945–1991); Croatia (1945–1991); Bosnia and Herzegovina (1945–1992) Serbia (1945–1992) (included the autonomous provinces of Vojvodina and Kosovo) Montenegro (1945–1992); Macedonia (1945–1991) See also: Free Territory of Trieste (1947–1954)^{h} | | | **Federal Republic of Yugoslavia** Consisted of the Republic of Serbia (1992–2006) and Republic of Montenegro (1992–2006) Included Kosovo and Metohija, under UN administration, without control since 1999 | **State Union of Serbia and Montenegro** Included Kosovo, under UN administration | **Montenegro** | |
| **Vardar Macedonia** | Part of the Kingdom of Serbia (1912–1918) | **State of Slovenes, Croats and Serbs** (1918) **Kingdom of Serbs,** **Croats and Slovenes** (1918–1929) **Kingdom of Yugoslavia** (1929–1943) See also: Republic of Prekmurje (1919) Banat, Bačka and Baranja (1918–1919) Free State of Fiume (1920–1924) (1924–1945) Italian province of Zadar (1920–1947) | | Annexed by the Kingdom of Bulgaria (1941–1944) | **Democratic Federal Yugoslavia** (1943–1945) **Federal People's Republic of Yugoslavia** (1945–1963) **Socialist Federal Republic of Yugoslavia** (1963–1992) Consisted of the Socialist Republics of: Slovenia (1945–1991); Croatia (1945–1991); Bosnia and Herzegovina (1945–1992) Serbia (1945–1992) (included the autonomous provinces of Vojvodina and Kosovo) Montenegro (1945–1992); Macedonia (1945–1991) See also: Free Territory of Trieste (1947–1954)^{h} | | | **Republic of North Macedonia**^{g} | | | |
^{a} Prekmurje annexed by Hungary.; ^{b} See also: SAO Kninska Krajina (1990) → SAO Krajina (1990–1991); and SAO Eastern Slavonia, Baranja and Western Syrmia (1990–1991), SAO Western Slavonia (1990–1991) and the Republic of Serbian Krajina (1990–1995), all replaced by the UN Transitional Administration for Eastern Slavonia, Baranja and Western Sirmium (1996–1998).; ^{c} See also: Republic of Bosnia and Herzegovina; Croatian Republic of Herzeg-Bosnia; and the Serbian Autonomous Oblasts (SAOs) of Bosanska Krajina, North-East Bosnia, Romanija and Herzegovina (1991–1992), which all combined to form the Serbian Republic of Bosnia and Herzegovina (1992–1995).; ^{d} Bačka was reannexed by Hungary (1941–1944), while Syrmia was annexed by the Independent State of Croatia (1941–1944).; ^{e} Including North Kosovo. See also: Republic of Užice.; ^{f} Annexed by Italy (1941–1943) and Germany (1943–1944). Smaller part annexed by the Independent State of Croatia (1941–1944).; ^{g} North Macedonia's official and constitutional name was the Republic of Macedonia until 2019. It was known in the United Nations as the former Yugoslav Republic of Macedonia because of a naming dispute with Greece.; ^{h} Free Territory was established in 1947. Its administration was divided into two areas (Zone A) and (Zone B). Free Territory was de facto taken over by Italy and SFRY in 1954.
