= 2020 in Croatia =

- Decades: 2000s; 2010s; 2020s
- See also: Other events of 2020; Timeline of Croatian history

== Incumbent ==
- President
  - Kolinda Grabar-Kitarović (until February 18)
  - Zoran Milanović (from February 19)
- Prime Minister – Andrej Plenković

== Events ==
Ongoing – COVID-19 pandemic in Croatia

=== January ===
- January 1 – Croatia assumed the presidency of the Council of the European Union.
- January 5 – Former prime minister Zoran Milanović defeated president Kolinda Grabar-Kitarović in the second round of the presidential election with 53% of the vote.
- January 26 – Croatia men's national handball team finished second at the 2020 European Men's Handball Championship after a 22-20 loss to Spain in the final.

=== February ===
- February 18 – Zoran Milanović was inaugurated as the fifth President of Croatia.
- February 25 – The first case of COVID-19 in the country was confirmed.

=== March ===
- March 12 – The Croatian Football Federation suspended all football leagues in the country.
- March 13 – All classes in schools and universities were suspended, effective March 16.
- March 21 – All public transport in the country was suspended.
- March 22 – Zagreb was hit by a strong earthquake, killing a person, wounding 26 others, and damaging several structures.

=== April ===
- April 14 – The number of active COVID-19 cases reached a peak of 1,258.
- April 24 – The number of recorded COVID-19 cases surpassed 2,000.

=== May ===
- May 18 – The 9th Croatian Parliament dissolved itself.

=== June ===
- June 21 – Adria Tour final in Zadar is cancelled after Grigor Dimitrov tested positive for COVID-19. Within a week, other participants of the Zadar event including Borna Ćorić, Viktor Troicki, Novak Djokovic and Goran Ivanišević tested positive too.

=== July ===
- July 5 – Parliamentary elections were held.
- July 10 – The country joined the European Exchange Rate Mechanism.

=== September ===
- September 10 – Mate Pavić and Bruno Soares win the US Open Men's Doubles title.

=== October ===
- October 12 – 2020 Zagreb shooting.

=== December ===
- December 20 – Croatia women's national handball team finished third at the 2020 European Women's Handball Championship, winning the bronze medal, first-ever medal in Croatian women's handball history.
- December 27 – COVID-19 vaccination begins.
- December 28 – Sisak-Moslavina County was hit by a strong earthquake, with damage being reported.
- December 29 – 2020 Petrinja earthquake. Seven people killed and 26 injured.

== Deaths ==
=== January ===
- January 1 – Damir Mihanović, comedian and musician (b. 1961).
- January 4 – Zdravko Tomac, politician and writer (b. 1937).
- January 21 – Zlatko Mesić, footballer (b. 1946).
- January 24 – Duje Bonačić, rower (b. 1929).

=== February ===
- February 15 – Vatroslav Mimica, film director (b. 1923).

=== March ===
- March 3 – Božidar Alić, actor (b. 1954).
- March 7 – Veronika Durbešić, actress (b. 1945).
- March 8 – Zdenka Vučković, singer (b. 1942).
- March 22 – Branko Cikatić, heavyweight kickboxer (b. 1955).

=== May ===
- May 21 – Bekim Sejranović, writer (b. 1972).

=== June ===
- June 20 – Ema Derossi-Bjelajac, communist politician (b. 1926).
- June 30 – Ivo Banac, historian (b. 1947).

=== August ===
- August 4 – Rajko Dujmić, musician and composer (b. 1954).
- August 11 – Tonko Maroević, poet, writer and academic (b. 1941).
- August 15 – Josip Kregar, sociologist, jurist and politician (b. 1953).

=== September ===
- September 5 – Žarko Domljan, politician (b. 1932).

=== October ===
- October 18 – Orlando Rivetti, sports journalist (b. 1951).
- October 25 – Slaven Letica, sociologist, politician and university professor (b. 1940).
- October 26 – Jean-Jacques Roskam, rock guitarist (b. 1954).
- October 29 – Slaven Zambata, footballer (b. 1940).

=== November ===
- November 2 – Mladen Kušec, poet, narrator, publicist and journalist (b. 1938).
- November 7 — Vera Zima, actress (b. 1953).
- November 11 – Anđelka Martić, writer and translator (b. 1924).
- November 12 – Krasnodar Rora, footballer (b. 1945).
- November 13 – Krunoslav Kićo Slabinac, folk singer (b. 1944).
- November 15 – Ivan Kožarić, artist (b. 1921).
- November 15 – Anto Kovačević, politician, publicist and philosopher (b. 1952).
- November 16 – Tomislav Merčep, convicted war criminal (b. 1952).
- November 22 – Mustafa Nadarević, actor (b. 1943).
- November 27 – Špiro Guberina, actor (b. 1933).
- November 28 – Vera Tomašek, journalist and editor (b. 1958).

=== December ===
- December 1 – Lazo Goluža, editor, quiz author and translator (b. 1936).
- December 11 – Đurđa Ivezić, actress (b. 1936).
- December 13 – Otto Barić, football player and manager (b. 1933).
- December 18 – Vojmir Kačić, football manager (b. 1934).
- December 23 – Pero Kvrgić, actor (b. 1927).
- December 26 – Milka Babović, sprint and hurdles runner, and later sports journalist (b. 1928).

== See also ==
- List of years in Croatia
- Timeline of the COVID-19 pandemic in Croatia
