= HIV/AIDS in Croatia =

The HIV/AIDS epidemic, caused by HIV, first appeared in Croatia in 1985. By that point, major routes of transmission and the knowledge of the at-risk groups had been well described by epidemiologists. The first National AIDS Health Protection Programme had been established in 1983, even before the first occurrence of AIDS, with three major strategies: education, prevention of transmission through blood and blood products, and risk reduction.

As of November 2020, there are currently 1511 active cases of HIV infection in Croatia, the majority of which (89%) are men. The infection rate is at 2.2 per 100.000, which is significantly below the European Union average of 5.6 per 100.000. HIV is most often contracted through sexual intercourse (89.1% of the reported cases), majority of which came through male homosexual intercourse (70.6%). Drug injections with tainted needles account for 4.2% of all new infections.

== Mortality and morbidity ==
Between 1985 and 2005, there were 553 cases of HIV infection, 239 of which progressed to AIDS. During this time period, 127 of those 553 HIV patients passed away. The occurrence of HIV infection increased yearly, with most infections being acquired abroad, until 1994, when the infection rate stabilized at 16 cases per year. The majority of infections occurred with the homosexual population (42.7%). Among the heterosexual population, it occurred almost always with men (32.2%) who have spent considerable time abroad. All cases were in the adult population, above the age of 20. From the first occurrence of HIV in Croatia in 1985, until 2020, 1819 people in Croatia contracted HIV, of which 570 progressed to AIDS. 308 of these died from consequences of HIV/AIDS.

Since 1998 antiretroviral (ARV) therapy has been available free of charge for all HIV infected persons in Croatia. With its introduction the mortality and morbidity rate has dropped off significantly. While the immediate threat to life is removed, patients are still burdened by difficult medication regimens and side effects. However, most HIV patients describe their quality of life as "good" to "very good", although this varies depending on age, marital status, level of education and whether the illness is active.

== Infection rates ==
The three groups most at risk from HIV/AIDS are migrant workers (seafarers), female sex workers and homosexual men.

Between 1985 and 2009, 784 cases of HIV were registered in Croatia. Of these, 74 were seafarers (9.4%), which made up 0.25% of the Croatian seafarers. Five were highly educated, i.e. officers, while 69 of the infected seafarers were in the lower education category, i.e. those without a high-school diploma. The morbidity rate among the seafarers of lower education is 27 times those of the general population.

Female sex workers are globally among the most vulnerable populations to HIV infection. In low and middle income countries, they are 13.5 times more likely to contract it than women who don't prostitute. In a study performed by the University of Zagreb, which analyzed the female sex workers of Split and Zagreb, it was found that they had a high percentage of condom use in commercial intercourse, but a lower rate of use in non-commercial intercourse. There was a substantial level of injecting drug use. In general, the study reflected the global trend.

The most at risk group were homosexuals. HIV prevalence among the population in 2011 was 2.8%, which was however slightly lower than in previous years. The infection rate remains more-or-less stable.

== Prevention ==
In 2007, a study was performed to test the knowledge of the illness itself and its prevention among the young (aged 20–29) and sexually active population. The correct answers to questions varied from 64% to 86%, with female participants showing a greater amount of knowledge. Neither religious upbringing, nor religiousness were associated with the level of knowledge. Public education of HIV/AIDS continues through the work of private institutions and non-profit initiatives.

Free and anonymous HIV testing is available in Zagreb, Rijeka, Split, Zadar, Pula, Dubrovnik, Osijek and Slavonski Brod. Aside from the testing, the CroAIDS initiative offers counseling, education and free contraceptives in the form of condoms.

Government initiatives on public education are occasionally held, such as the "Unapređenje borbe protiv HIV/AIDS-a u Hrvatskoj 2003.–2006". However, these have tended to have poor results, possibly due to a lack of a concentrated and sustained effort to educate the wider population.

== See also ==
- Health in Croatia
- AIDS pandemic
