= Smoking in Croatia =

Smoking in Croatia is legally permitted, with certain restrictions. Smoking is banned in all enclosed public spaces, with the exception of psychiatric wards and designated smoking rooms. All direct or indirect advertisement of tobacco or smoking is banned as well. All tobacco product packaging must, by law, display health warnings.

== Prevalence ==
=== Adult population ===
During the 1994-1998 period, 32.6% of the population smoked. The percentage decreased during the 1999-2001 period, dropping down to 30.3%. It further lowered in the 2002-2005 period, when it dipped down to 27.4%. The prevalence of smoking among men remained almost unchanged during this period (a decrease from 34.1 to 33.8%), while the decrease among women was almost 10% (from 31.6% to 21.7%). The expenditure for tobacco and proportion of GDP spent on tobacco was 1.6%. According to this, approximately every third male, and every fifth women in Croatia smoked. By 2015, that number had remained stable, with 27.5% of the population being regular smokers, and 3.6% claiming to smoke occasionally. More men (31.8%) than women (23.4%) smoked regularly, while the same didn't hold true for occasional smokers (3.5% men, 3.7% women). The majority of smokers were in the 25-44 age group (38.9%), while the next largest age group were between 45-64 (36.5%).

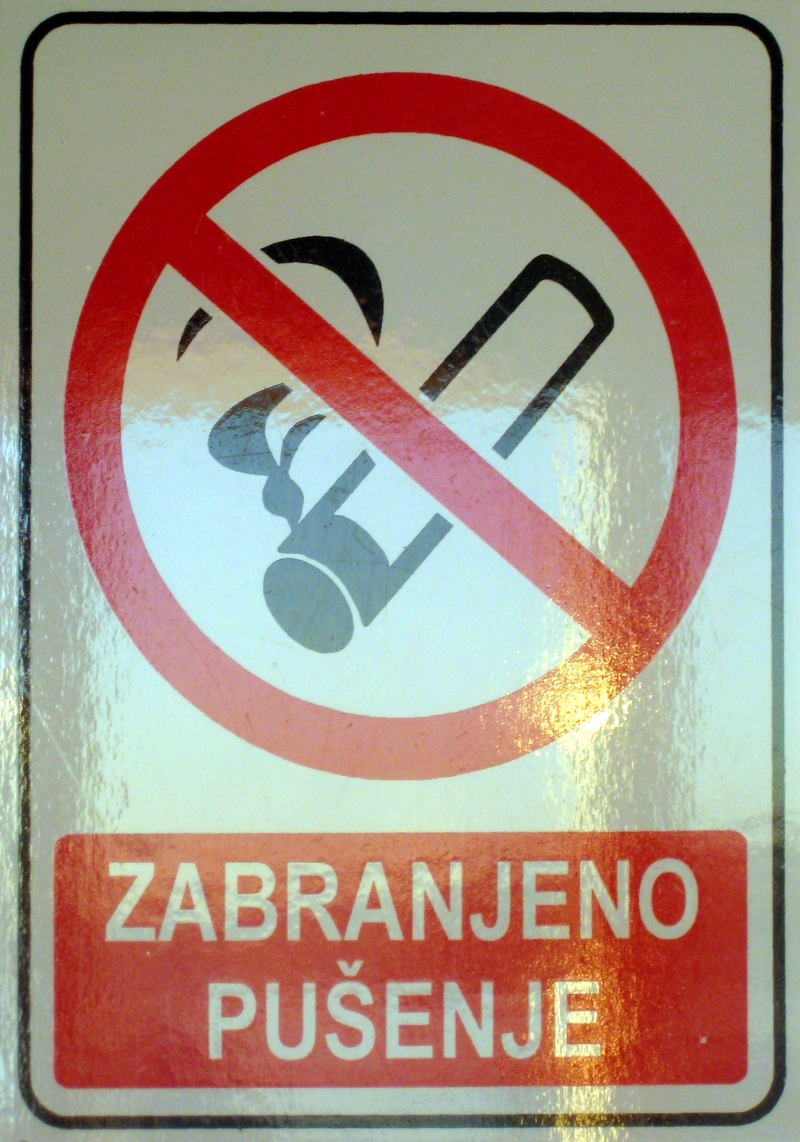
A no smoking sign in Croatia

=== Children and elderly ===
11.6% of the population above the age of 65 are active smokers. The majority of these smokers are located in eastern Croatia (14.1%), followed by central Croatia (13.9%), northern Croatia (13.3%), western Croatia (10.9%), southern Croatia (8.7%), with the city of Zagreb being the last on the list with only 7.1%. Smokers above the age of 65 reflect the general trend, with more men smoking than women.

In 2002, 59.9% of children (below the age of 18) claimed to have smoked at least once, with the number rising to 67.1% in 2006. Of these, 32.6% were below the age of 10 in 2006. In 2002., every sixth child (16.6%) claimed to smoke regularly, while in 2006, every fourth child (24.8%) claimed the same. In 2011., 27% of male and 26.7% of female children smoked, while the percentage dropped significantly in 2016., when 15.1% of male and 14.1% of female children smoked.

== Health issues ==
A stroke is the leading cause of death in Croatia, as well as being the leading cause of disability. Smoking affects the circulatory system in a number of ways: it raises the level of certain fats, and impairs the release of prostacyclin which regulates the vascular smooth muscle. Furthermore, the intake of 4000 different chemicals and the decreased blood oxygen level contributes to atherogenesis. The relative risk of subarachnoid hemorrhage with long-term heavy smokers (>20 cigarettes a day) is 7.3, compared to those who never smoked. The relative risk of an ischemic stroke 2.7 with heavy smokers and 2.2 with those who smoke less than 20 cigarettes a day.

Among the diseases that can be caused by smoking are vascular stenosis, lung cancer, heart attacks and chronic obstructive pulmonary disease. Smoking during pregnancy may cause ADHD to a fetus. 95% of those who died from lung cancer were smokers.

Smoking leads to other illnesses as well: smokers are more likely to develop asthma (although it doesn't cause it), it leads to bronchial hyperresponsiveness, and can lead to the development of atopic dermatitis in adolescents.

== Prevention ==
Croatia is part of three international anti-smoking initiatives. It has observed the World No Tobacco Day since 1990, when it declared independence, and has since observed it through various conferences, public events and educational programs. Since 2007, it has implemented the "Quit and Win" health action on a national level, where it rewards heavy smokers who give up cigarettes for a period of four weeks. Lastly, it was one of the first signatories of the WHO Framework Convention on Tobacco Control, which was ratified on 14 July 2008. The Convention aims at better legal regulation of public smoking ban, sale of tobacco to children, and better education on the health effects of smoking.

== See also ==
- Healthcare in Croatia
- European Tobacco Products Directive
- List of smoking bans
