= 2021 in Croatia =

- Decades: 2000s; 2010s; 2020s
- See also: Other events of 2021; Timeline of Croatian history

Events in the year 2021 in Croatia.

== Incumbents ==
- President: Zoran Milanović
- Prime Minister: Andrej Plenković
- Speaker – Gordan Jandroković

== Events ==
Ongoing — COVID-19 pandemic in Croatia

=== January ===
- January 2 – National day of mourning due to the 2020 Petrinja earthquake.
- January 5 – National day of mourning due to the 2021 Tribistovo poisoning.

=== April ===
- 12 April: The start of the 2021 Balkan non-papers.
  - The paper called for the "peaceful dissolution" of Bosnia and Herzegovina with the annexation of Republika Srpska and great parts of Herzegovina and Central Bosnia into a Greater Serbia and Greater Croatia, leaving a small Bosniak state in what is central and western Bosnia,

=== Scheduled events ===
- 25 to 31 January – Scheduled date for the 2021 European Figure Skating Championships, which were to be held in Zagreb. In December 2020 it was announced that the ISU Council had decided to cancel the championships due to increasing risks in view of the worldwide COVID-19 pandemic.
- 16 May – the 2021 Croatian local elections.

== Deaths ==
=== January ===
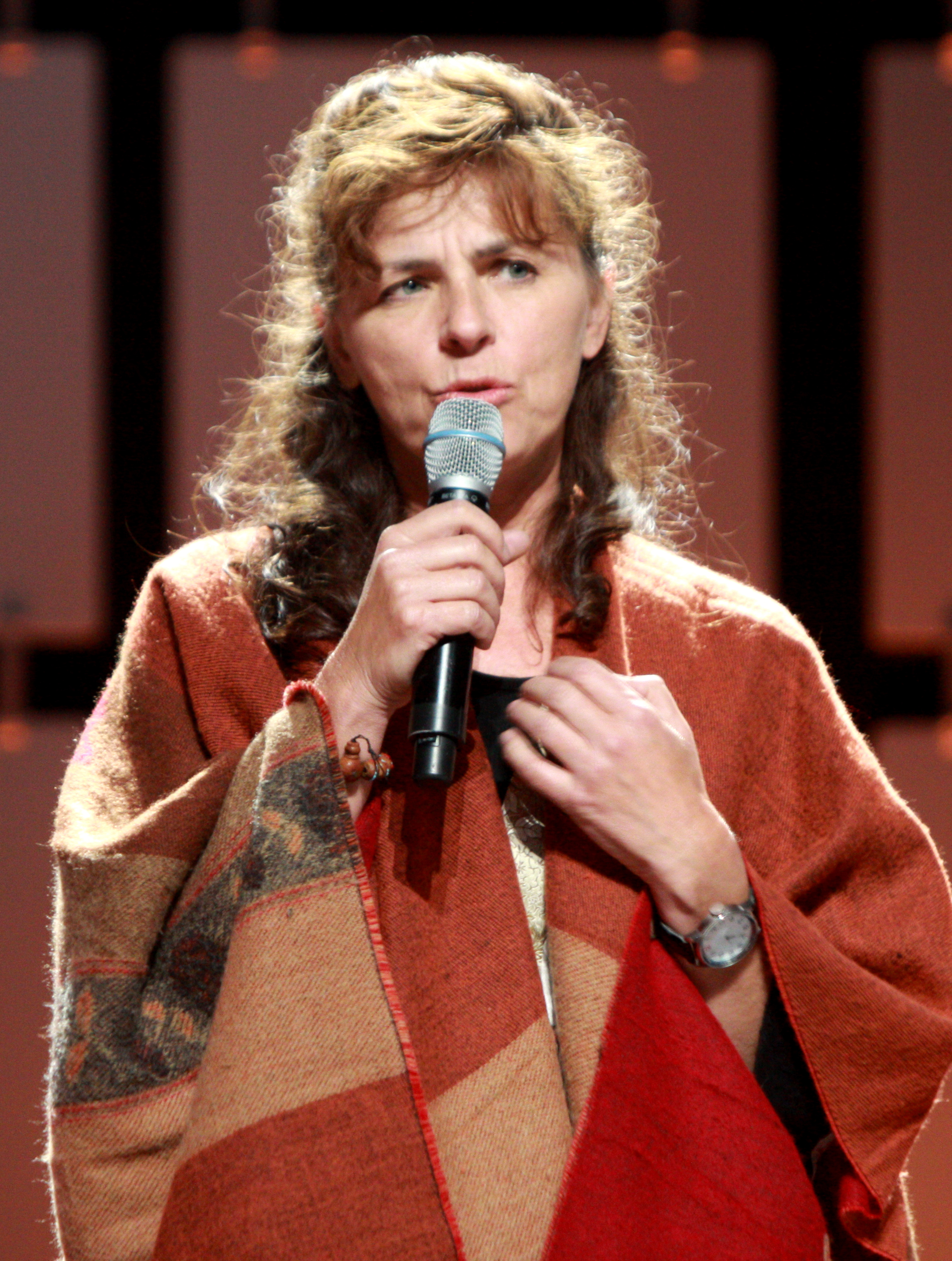
Mira Furlan

- January 4 – Nojko Marinović, general and war commander of the defence of Dubrovnik (b. 1948).
- January 20 – Mira Furlan, actress and singer (b. 1955).
- January 31 – Miroslav Tuđman, scientist and politician (b. 1946).

=== February ===
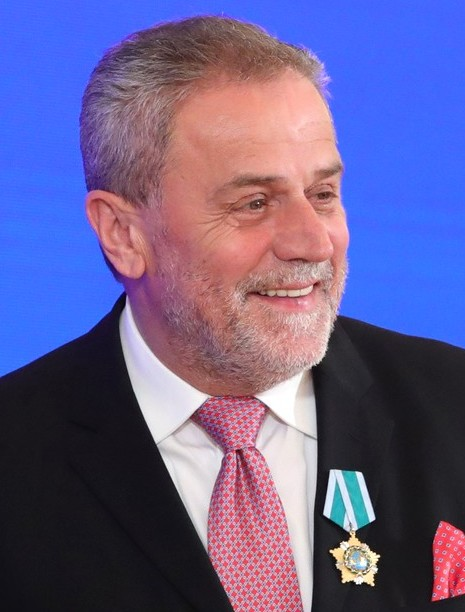
Milan Bandić

- February 1 – Đuro Savinović, water polo player (b. 1950).
- February 12 – Mladen Vranković, football player and manager (b. 1937).
- February 21 – Zlatko Saračević, handball player and coach (b. 1961).
- February 28 – Milan Bandić, politician and mayor of Zagreb (b. 1955).

=== March ===
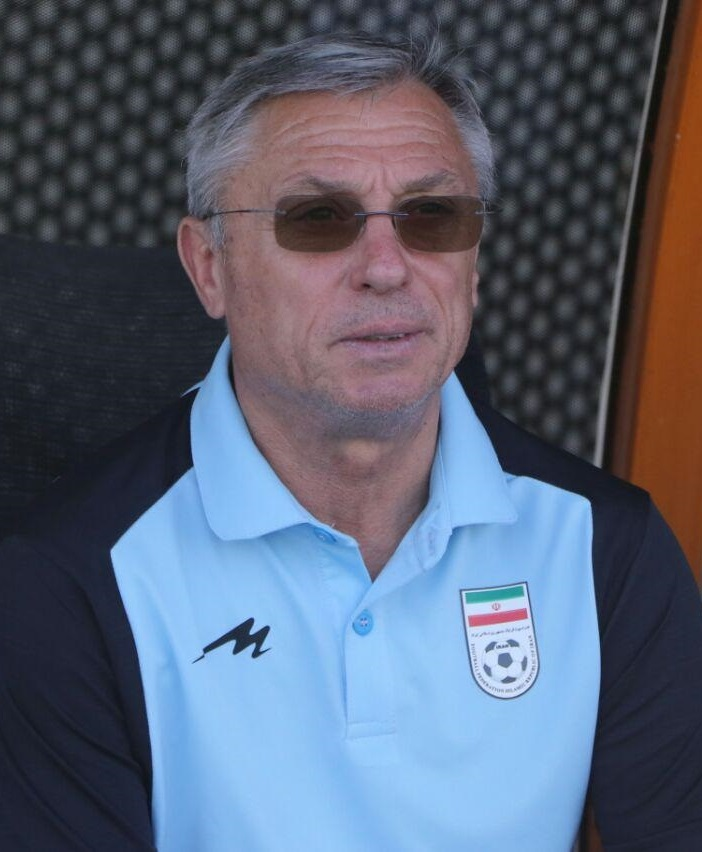
Zlatko Kranjčar

- March 1 – Zlatko Kranjčar, football player and manager (b. 1956).
- March 8 – Josip Alebić, sprinter (b. 1947).
- March 10 – Mirko Bazić, football player and manager (b. 1938).

=== April ===
- April 29 – Bogdan Žižić, film director and screenwriter (b. 1934).

=== May ===
- May 4 – Saša Anočić, actor and producer (b. 1968).

=== August ===
- August 8 – Aleksej Demjanov, gymnast (b. 1973).

=== September ===
- September 15 – Žana Lelas, basketball player (b. 1970).

=== October ===
- October 21 – Žarko Potočnjak, actor (b. 1946).

=== December ===
- December 3 – Kasandra, singer (b. 1967).
