= 2018 in Croatia =

- Decades: 1990s; 2000s; 2010s; 2020s
- See also: Other events of 2018; Timeline of Croatian history

== Incumbents ==
- President – Kolinda Grabar-Kitarović
- Prime Minister – Andrej Plenković
- Speaker – Gordan Jandroković

== Events ==
- 21 May – Mate Pavić reaches the number 1 spot in the ATP doubles ranking list for the first time.
- 15 July – Croatia national football team wins second place in the 2018 FIFA World Cup in Russia after losing 4–2 to France in the final.
- 25 November - Croatia won last old-format Davis Cup.
- 4 December– Luka Modrić wins the Ballon d'Or

== Deaths ==
- 2 January – Željko Senečić, production designer, film director and screenwriter
- 8 March – Milko Kelemen, composer
- 14 March – Petar Stipetić, general
- 15 July – Dragutin Šurbek, table tennis player
- 16 July – Marija Kohn, actress
- 29 July – Oliver Dragojević, singer
- 8 December – Milan Sijerković, meteorologist
- 24 December – Stanko Poklepović, football manager
- 27 December – Jakša Fiamengo, poet
