= Healthcare in Croatia =

Croatia has a universal health care system, whose roots can be traced back to the Hungarian-Croatian Parliament Act of 1891, providing a form of mandatory insurance of all factory workers and craftsmen. The population is covered by a basic health insurance plan provided by statute and optional insurance and administered by the Croatian Health Insurance Fund. In 2012, annual compulsory healthcare related expenditures reached 21 billion kuna (approximately 2.8 billion euro).

== Expenditure ==
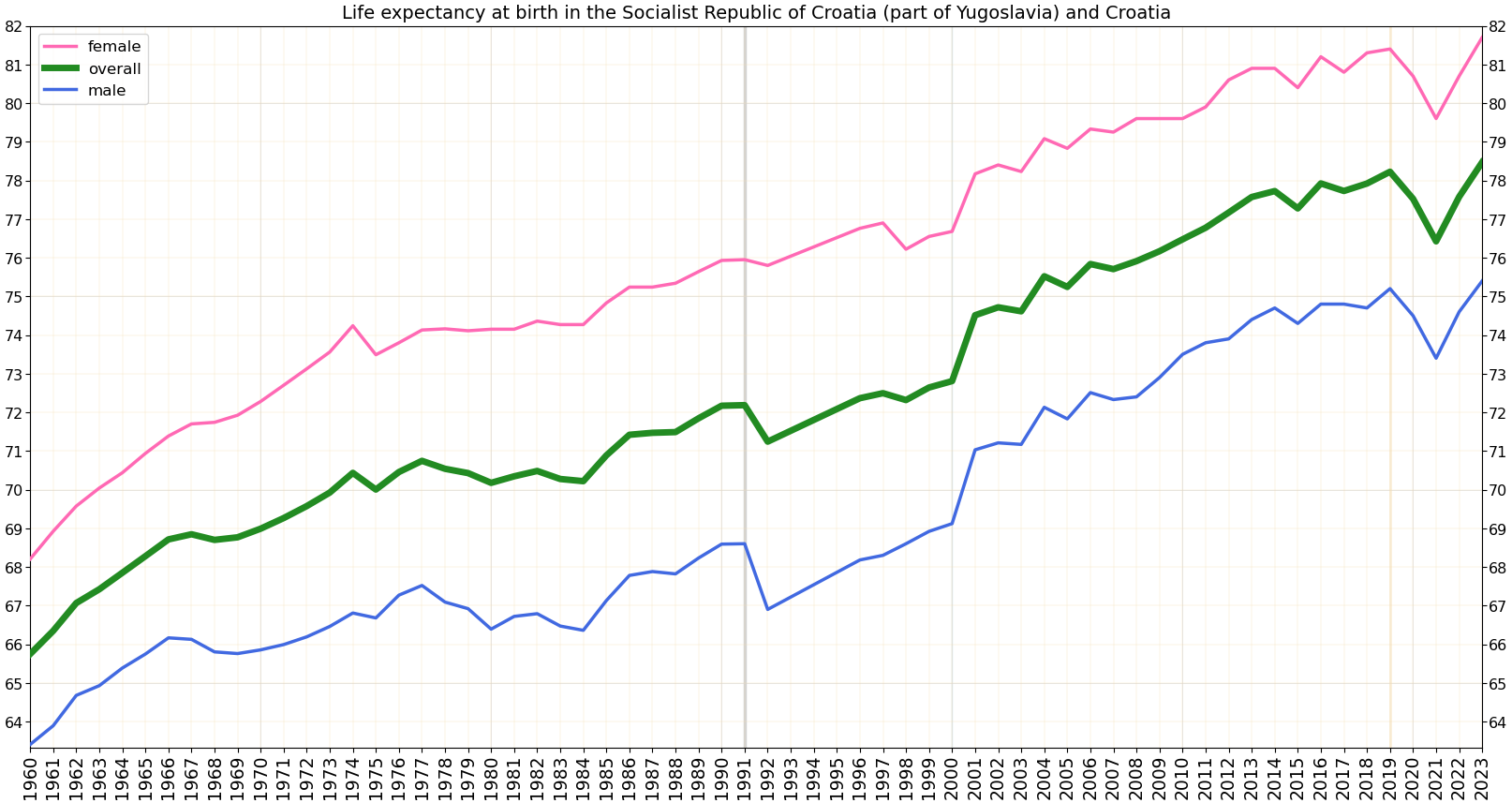
Life expectancy at birth in Croatia

Healthcare expenditures comprise 0.6% of private health insurance and public spending. In 2012, Croatia spent 6.8% of its GDP on healthcare, down from approximately 8% estimated in 2008, when 84% of healthcare spending came from public sources. Croatia ranked around the 50th in the world in life expectancy with 75,6 years for men and 81.4 years for women, and it had a low infant mortality rate of 6 per 1,000 live births.

== Institutions ==
There are hundreds of healthcare institutions in Croatia, including 79 hospitals and clinics with 25,285 beds, caring for more than 760,000 patients per year. Ownership of hospitals is shared between the state and the Counties of Croatia. There are 5,792 private practice offices, and a total of 46,020 health workers in the country, including 10,363 medical doctors. There are 79 emergency medical service units that performed more than one million interventions in 2012.

The Euro health consumer index placed it 16th in Europe, commenting that it did well with kidney transplants, performing more than 50 per million per year, and speculating that it might become a health tourism destination, as a state-of-the-art hip joint operation can be had for €3000.

== Health ==
The principal cause of death in 2011 was cardiovascular disease at 41.7% for men and 55.4% for women, followed by tumours, at 31.7% for men and 22.8% for women. In 2012 only 20 Croatians had been infected with HIV/AIDS and 6 had died from the disease. In 2008 it was estimated by the WHO that 27.4% of Croatians over age of 15 are smokers. According to 2003 WHO data, 22% of the Croatian adult population is obese. It had the second lowest rate of death from communicable diseases in Europe (12 per 100,000) in 2015.

== COVID-19 pandemic ==
On 25 February 2020, Croatia confirmed its first case. A 26-year-old man who had stayed in Milan, Italy from 19 to 21 February tested positive and was hospitalised at the University Hospital for Infectious Diseases Dr. Fran Mihaljević in Zagreb, Croatia.

The country had a national response to the pandemic, with a crisis headquarters formed by the government, led by the Minister of Health and including contributions from the Croatian Public Health Institute, Andrija Štampar School of Public Health in Zagreb, and other relevant institutions. The crisis management led to a widespread enforcement of social distancing rules, and later to widespread vaccination campaigns.

== See also ==
- Ministry of Health (Croatia)
- List of hospitals in Croatia
- 2020 coronavirus outbreak in Croatia

== Sources ==
- Ostroški, Ljiljana, ed. (December 2013). Statistički ljetopis Republike Hrvatske 2013 [2013 Statistical Yearbook of the Republic of Croatia] (PDF). Statistical Yearbook of the Republic of Croatia (in Croatian and English). Vol. 45. Zagreb: Croatian Bureau of Statistics. ISSN 1334-0638.
