= 2019 in Croatia =

- Decades: 1990s; 2000s; 2010s; 2020s
- See also: Other events of 2019; Timeline of Croatian history

This article lists events from the year 2019 in Croatia.

== Incumbents ==
- President – Kolinda Grabar-Kitarović
- Prime Minister – Andrej Plenković
- Speaker – Gordan Jandroković

== Events ==
- 5–6 January – Snow Queen Trophy in Zagreb
- 2 August – 2019 Zagreb shooting
- 26–29 September – 2019 ABA League Supercup in Zagreb

== Deaths ==
=== January ===
- 1 January
  - Franjo Emanuel Hoško, Catholic priest (b. 1940)
  - Ivo Gregurević, actor (b. 1952)
- 27 January – Robert Budak, actor (b. 1992)

=== April ===
- 3 April – Josip Zovko, actor (b. 1970)
- 16 April – Bazilije Pandžić, Croatian historian, archivist and orientalist (b. 1918)
- 19 April – Zora Dirnbach, Croatian journalist and writer (b. 1929)
- 29 April – Štefica Krištof, bowling champion (b. 1936)

=== May ===
- 23 May – Zlatko Škorić, football goalkeeper (b. 1941)
- 30 May – Ante Sirković, football goalkeeper (b. 1944)
- 31 May – Đelo Jusić, composer (b. 1939)

=== June ===
- 3 June – Jurica Jerković, footballer (b. 1950)

=== July ===
- 4 July – Dorica Nikolić, politician (b. 1948)
- 5 July – Josip Braovac, actor (b. 1987)

=== August ===
- 10 August – Radoslav Katičić, linguist (b. 1930)
- 14 August – Ivo Malec, composer and conductor (b. 1925)
- 18 August – Denis Kuljiš, journalist (b. 1951)

=== October ===
- 26 October – Ante Matošić, water polo player (b. 1940)

=== November ===
- 12 November
  - Martin Sagner, actor (b. 1932)
  - Mani Gotovac, critic, playwright, theatrologist and writer (b. 1939)
- 14 November – Branko Lustig, film producer (b. 1932)
