= Croatian Meteorological and Hydrological Service =

Meteorological and Hydrological Service

Croatian Meteorological and Hydrological Service Državni hidrometeorološki zavod
- DHMZ logo

Agency overview
- Formed: 27 August 1947; 79 years ago
- Type: Government of Croatia body
- Headquarters: Ravnice 48, Zagreb, Croatia
- Employees: 385 (2025 estimate)
- Budget: €34.2 million (2026 plan)
- Website: meteo.hr

Director General
- Currently: Ivan Güttler since 1 January 2024

The Croatian Meteorological and Hydrological Service (Croatian: Državni hidrometeorološki zavod or DHMZ) is a public entity for meteorology, hydrology and air quality in Croatia.

== History ==
DHMZ was founded in 1947, and since then it has been located on Grič 3 in Upper Town, old part of Zagreb. Before Croatia gained independence in 1991, its meteorological and hydrological service had been a part of the meteorological and hydrological service in the former Yugoslavia. After Croatia gaining independence, DHMZ operates as a state service. Since 1992, Croatia has been a member of the World Meteorological Organization, United Nations' agency specialized in weather, climate and water.

It is important to say that, although DHMZ was founded in 1947, the oldest Croatian meteorological station operating continuously was Zagreb-Grič, established in 1861, and DHMZ has such invaluable data in its responsibility.

== Mission ==
The DHMZ supports the economic and sustainable development of Croatia and assists in the protection of lives, goods, and the environment by providing information on the following: weather, climate, hydrological and ecological events, and climate extremes with the aim of mitigating their consequences in line with WMO recommendations and EU directives.

The DHMZ manages the meteorological and hydrological infrastructure, air quality monitoring infrastructure, as well as the national archives of meteorological, hydrological and other relevant data.

The DHMZ is considered a reputable international partner, particularly in southeastern and central Europe.

== DHMZ activities ==
- Construction of infrastructure and measurement systems, as well as planning and maintenance of all kinds of meteorological and hydrological stations and air quality measurement stations

- Development and maintenance of various databases (meteorological, hydrological, air quality)

- Provision of information on meteorology, hydrology and air quality to users. The DHMZ issues warnings and produces analyses, forecasts, studies and surveys using scientific methods, powerful computers and sophisticated software to develop numerical models

- Applied scientific research and development of methods designed to enhance the quality of information which the DHMZ offers to its users.

- Operational implementation of hailstorm defense

- DHMZ products/services are used in the following areas: public information services, physical planning, Construction, strategic planning, urban planning, architecture, water resource management, electricity resource management, traffic, healthcare, sports, physical recreation, environment and nature protection, agriculture, civil protection, protection of lives

== National meteorological and hydrological infrastructure and air quality monitoring infrastructure (as of 31/12/2015) ==
Meteorological station network:

40 main meteorological stations

104 climatological stations

339 rainfall stations

22 totalisers

Hydrological station network:

487 surface water measurement stations

698 groundwater measurement stations

Permanent air quality monitoring station network (nationwide):

10 background stations

9 urban stations

Other:

59 phenological stations

8 radars

2 radiosonde stations

1 sodar

== The membership and partnership with international and intergovernmental organizations and programs ==
- WMO - World Meteorological Organization,
- ECMWF - European Centre for Medium - Range Weather Forecasts
- EUMETSAT - EUMETSAT - European Organization for the Exploitation of Meteorological Satellites
- - EUMETNET - Network of European Meteorological Services
- - ECOMET - Economic Interest Grouping of the National Meteorological Services of the European Economic Area
- - GEO - Group on Earth Observations
- - IPCC - Intergovernmental Panel on Climate Change
- - ALADIN - International consortium for high Resolution Numerical Weather Prediction Model
- LACE - RC LACE - Regional Cooperation for Limited Area modeling in Central Europe
- - JCOMM - Joint WMO/lOC Technical Commission for Oceanography and Marine Meteorology
- - GCOS - Global Climate Observing System
- - EMEP - Cooperative Program for the Monitoring and Evaluation of the Long-range Transmission of Air Pollutants in Europe
- - EFAS - The European Flood Awareness System
- ICCED - Informal Conference of Central European Directors of hydrological and Meteorological Services
- ICSEED - Informal Conference of South-East European NMHS Directors
- - HyMEX - Hydrological cycle in the Mediterranean Experiment
- - IRBC - International Sava River Basin Commission

== Noted employees ==
- Milan Sijerković

== See also ==
- Department of Geophysics, Faculty of Science, University of Zagreb
- Croatian Meteorological Society
