= Milan Sijerković =

Croatian meteorologist (1935–2018)

mr. sc. Milan Sijerković
- Born: November 5, 1935; Baošići, Zeta Banovina, Kingdom of Yugoslavia
- Died: December 10, 2018 (aged 83); Zagreb, Croatia
- Citizenship: Croatian
- Education: Faculty of Science, University of Zagreb
- Scientific career
- Fields: Meteorology; Geophysics
- Workplaces: Croatian Meteorological and Hydrological Service

Milan Sijerković (5 November 1935 – 10 December 2018) was an eminent Croatian meteorologist, university professor, publicist and TV weather-presenter.

== Life and work ==
Sijerković was born in Baošići near Kotor Bay, Kingdom of Yugoslavia, today Montenegro, to ethnic Croats. He studied geophysics and meteorology at the Faculty of Science, University of Zagreb, where he firstly graduated in 1961, but also get a master's degree in 1977.

From 1963 till his retirement he worked in Croatian Meteorological and Hydrological Service in Zagreb as a prognostic, at the Croatian Radiotelevision as TV presenter and as a university professor at his alma mater. He was also contributor for Croatian scientific magazine Priroda (Nature).

He has published more than a hundred scientific papers from the various fields of meteorology, as well as collected Croatian proverbs about climate and numerous meteorological elements of the folk's wisdom, which he published in a few books.

During his retirement, he honorary worked as a TV presenter at Nova TV and a columnist for their web portal Dnevnik.hr.

He died in Zagreb on 8 December 2018 aged 83.
