= Zora Dirnbach =

Croatian journalist and writer (1929–2019)

- Born: 22 August 1929; Osijek, Kingdom of Serbs, Croats, and Slovenes (present-day Croatia)
- Died: 19 April 2019 (aged 89)
- Education: University of Zagreb
- Occupation: Writer
- Relatives: Samuel and Marija Dirnbach (parents); Gertruda Dirnbach (sister)

Zora Dirnbach (22 August 1929 – 19 April 2019) was a Croatian-Jewish journalist and writer, born in Osijek on 22 August 1929 to a Jewish father and Austrian-born Catholic mother who converted to Judaism in 1922. She was raised with her sister Gertruda.

Zora Dirnbach studied art history at the Faculty of Philosophy at the University of Zagreb. Since 1949, Dirnbach worked as a journalist and editor of the cultural section at the daily newspapers, and Radio Zagreb. Since 1958, she worked as a dramatist on Radio Zagreb first channel, and since 1963–91 as a dramatist and editor of television drama program on Radio-Television Zagreb (now Croatian Radiotelevision). Dirnbach was author of three feature film scenarios, more than a dozen radio plays, TV dramas, TV movies, two series, adaptation and translation of a large number of radio and TV dramas. As an associate, Dirnbach taught TV dramaturgy for several years at the Academy of Dramatic Art, University of Zagreb.

She authored several novels and collections of short stories. Through her life Dirnbach was inspired by the tragedy of the Shoah, personal and family tragedy, as she gave invaluable contribution to the Jewish community in Croatia. With the extensive involvement at Zagreb's Jewish community council, she led the Committee for Information at the council.

Although Dirnbach was christened by her family during World War II in an attempt to save her life, she considered herself to be an atheist Croatian Jew. Her mother and sister survived the Holocaust although many members of her family did not. She died on 19 April 2019.

== Bibliography ==
- Goldstein, Ivo (2001). Holokaust u Zagrebu. Zagreb: Novi Liber. ISBN 953-6045-19-2.
- Snješka Knežević, Aleksander Laslo (2011). Židovski Zagreb. Zagreb: AGM, Židovska općina Zagreb. ISBN 978-953-174-393-8.
