= Za križen =

Croatian Roman Catholic night procession

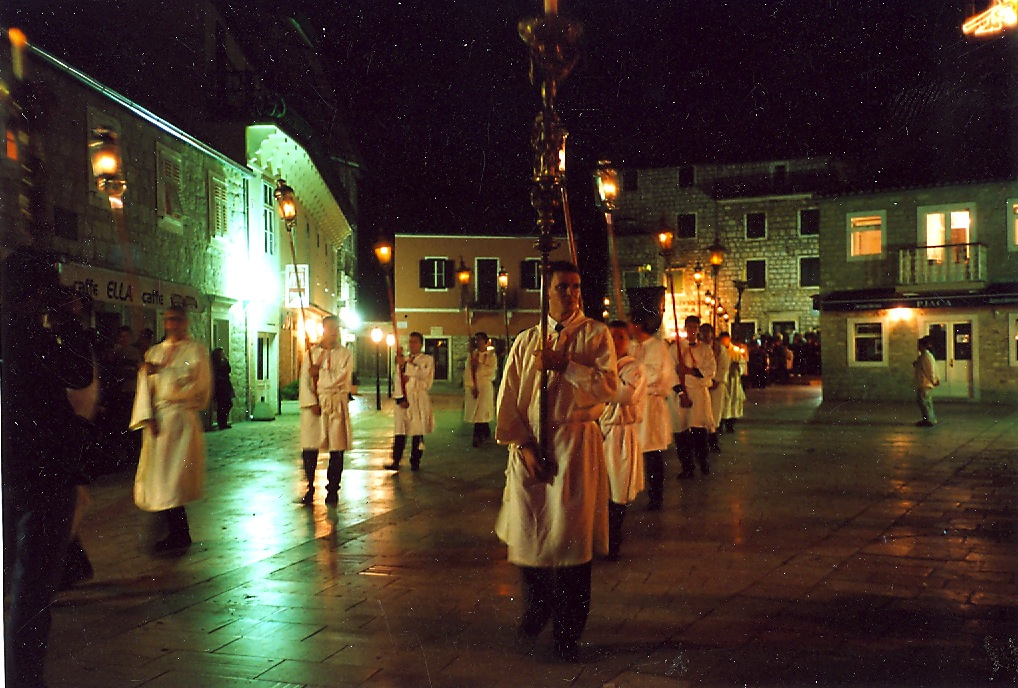
- Procession of the cross
- Date: Maundy Thursday
- Frequency: Annual
- Locations: Hvar, Croatia

Procession Za Križen ('following the cross') on the island of Hvar
- UNESCO Intangible Cultural Heritage
- Country: Croatia
- Reference: 00242
- Region: Europe and North America

Inscription history
- Inscription: 2009 (4th session)
- List: Representative

Za križen [za kriʒen] (local vernacular Croatian for "Following the Cross") is a night procession that happens every Maundy Thursday on the island of Hvar, Croatia. The event has centuries of tradition and is included in the UNESCO Intangible Cultural Heritage Lists.

They go through the towns: Svirče, Vrbanj, Vrboska, Jelsa, Pitve and Vrisnik

The procession is a unique ceremony of a special piety, and an expression of a religious and cultural identity of the inhabitants of the middle part of the island of Hvar that has been held for five centuries. Their 8-hour duration, in which everyone passes 25 km is also notable, as is its stress for its passion play content. The backbone of the procession is the Gospin plač [ɡospin platʃ] (English: Weeping of the Lady), octosyllabic Passion text from the 15th century that in the form of music Dialog sing chosen singers, kantaduri [kantaduri].

== Description ==
The procession Za križen every year starts at exactly at 22 hours so that six Processions start simultaneously from six Parish churches from the middle part of the island, in villages Vrbanj, Vrboska, Jelsa, Pitve, Vrisnik and Svirče. Every Procession revolves in a large circle, so that at 7 in the morning every one would return in its own starting point.

Every procession is led by a crossbearer carrying a cross. The role of the crossbearer is an immense honor on the island, and is determined as many as 20 years in advance. The crossbearer goes in the accompaniment of helpers, two followers that carry the big candle holders, two lead singers and several responders that sing the Gospin plač. All are dressed in formal suits – white brotherhood tunics. By number, the biggest one is the Procession of Jelsa, in which the number of pilgrims can surpass one thousand. Others are significantly smaller, and only the one from the village Pitve can surpass one hundred pilgrims. The Procession of Jelsa is also specific after the custom that the crossbearer runs across the last hundred meters of the way.

Passing through all six villages included in the procession, the participants show their piety in all the churches on the way. The priest in every of the churches blesses the crossbearer and encourages him, and the singers sing the Gospin plač, and the walking continues. The processions must not meet, and to accomplish this, their movements are carefully coordinated.

During the way, the pilgrims pray and sing, and particularly impressive is the singing of the Gospin plač in the original form.

On Good Friday these six villages relax, until the pious people have rested from the exhausting night. Only in the afternoon hours the villages come to life when the locals go to participate in the piety of the Holy Week.

== History of the procession ==
Emergence of the Procession is bound to the Crucifix of Sveti križić [sʋeti kriʒitɕ] (Croatian: Holly Little Cross), that is kept in the Hvar Cathedral since 1510. After the records in the Archive, Sveti križić was in 1510 in care in the house of Nikola Bevilaqua. In the time of turmoil between the commoners and the nobility on 6 February 1510. Sveti križić has started to bleed. Then on Hvar started the intense worship of the Cross.

The first written record of the procession dates from 16 February 1658.

In 2009 the tradition of the Procession Za križen was written in the UNESCO's Lists of Intangible Cultural Heritage.
