= Bekim Sejranović =

Bosnian, Croatian and Norwegian writer (1972–2020)

- Born: 1972; Brčko, SFR Yugoslavia
- Died: 21 May 2020 (aged 47–48); Banja Luka, Bosnia and Herzegovina
- Resting place: City cemetery, Tuzla
- Occupation: Writer
- Writing career
- Notable works: Nigdje, niotkuda (2008)

Bekim Sejranović (1972 – 21 May 2020) was a Bosnian, Croatian and Norwegian writer of Albanian descent.

== Biography ==
Sejranović was born in 1972 in Brčko, present-day Bosnia and Herzegovina. In 1985, he moved to Rijeka, where he graduated from nautical school. In 1993, he moved to Oslo, where he graduated in South Slavic languages and literatures at the University of Oslo. In 2001, he translated and edited an anthology of Norwegian short stories, Veliki pusti krajolik (Vast desert landscape). The same year, he published the study Modernizam u romanu Isušena kaljuža Janka Polića Kamova (Modernism in the novel The Dried Bilge by Janko Polić Kamov). He made a literary debut in 2002 with the collection of short stories Fasung. For the novel Nigdje, niotkuda (Nowhere, from nowhere, 2008), he was awarded Meša Selimović Prize in 2009. He published a total of five novels during his lifetime. He was also a translator from Norwegian. In 2025, his unfinished novel Chinook, originally written in Norwegian, was posthumously published in Croatian in Zagreb. Themes of Sejranović's novels include refugee, emigration, escape from war madness and intolerance, the position of the other among the intolerant majority, nomadism, the search for freedom, existential discomfort and social rootlessness. He died on 21 May 2020 in Banja Luka after a short and serious illness, aged 48.

== Works ==
- Modernizam u romanu Isušena kaljuža Janka Polića Kamova (2001)
- Fasung (2002)
- Nigdje, niotkuda (2008)
- Ljepši kraj (2010)
- Sandale (2013)
- Tvoj sin Huckleberry Finn (2015)
- Dnevnik jednog nomada (2017)
- Chinook (2025)
