= Anđelka Martić =

Croatian writer (1924–2020)

- Born: 1 May 1924; Zagreb, Croatia
- Died: 11 November 2020 (aged 96)
- Occupations: Writer, literary translator
- Writing career
- Language: Croatian
- Years active: 1945–2020
- Genres: Children's literature, war prose
- Notable work: Pirgo
- Notable awards: Order of Labor with Golden Wreath, Order of the Smile, Ivana Brlić Mažuranić Award

Anđelka Martić (1 May 1924 – 11 November 2020) was a Croatian writer and literary translator. She is best known for her children's war prose, especially for her novel Pirgo about a friendship of a boy and an orphan fawn in the whirlwind of the Second World War.

== Biography ==
Martić was born in Zagreb, as the second of three kids. Her father died young in 1933, and her sickly mother struggled to make ends meet, so she spent time with her grandparents in the countryside. Those visits became one of her main literary motifs.

On the verge of World War II she graduated from high school. After her brother, a resistance activist, got exposed and captured in 1941 by the Croatian puppet state militia, and executed in February 1942 at Jasenovac concentration camp, she joined the partisans and served as a war correspondent. At the end of war she took part in the liberation of Belgrade, earning the Yugoslav Order of Bravery medal for rescuing a wounded comrade.

Her first poems were published in journal Kulturni prilozi. After the war, she worked as a journalist for the newspapers Vjesnik and Omladinski borac and for the children's magazine Pionir. She was the editor-in-chief of the children's magazine Radost and the editor-in-chief of the publishing house Naša djeca. She has been a member of the Croatian Writers' Association since 1954.

== Works ==
Martić wrote poems, children's books, and texts for picture books. She is the most prominent author of Croatian war prose for children; yet a few of her works are autobiographical books and fantastic prose in the best tradition of Croatian writer Ivana Brlić-Mažuranić. In her novel Pirgo, written in the first person, she tells a lyrical story about a war in which all beings suffer without distinction.

Her works have been translated into foreign languages ranging from Polish, Czech, Russian and Italian to Esperanto, Chinese and Persian. She herself translated a number of books from the Slovenian language.

Published works:

- Mali konjovodac i druge priče – Zagreb, 1951
- Bjelkan – Zagreb, 1951
- Pirgo – Zagreb, 1953
- Jezero u planini – Zagreb, 1956
- Vuk na Voćinskoj cesti – Zagreb, 1956
- U vihoru – Zagreb, 1958
- Dječak i šuma – Zagreb, 1960
- Kurir Dragan i njegovo konjče – Sarajevo, 1961
- Neugasivi životi – Zagreb, 1961
- Mali borac – Zagreb, 1964
- Proljeće, mama i ja – Zagreb, 1968
- Baba Kata – Zagreb, 1971
- Djedica Pričalo i čarobni vrutak – Zagreb, 1977
- Šašavi dani – Zagreb, 1978
- Mali konjovodac – Zagreb, 1985
- Izabrana djela in Pet stoljeća hrvatske književnost – Zagreb, 1991
- Zarobljenik šumske kuće – Zagreb, 1999
- Tri lisice i šumski car – Zagreb, 2002
- Dječak div i druge bajke – Zagreb, 2002

== Awards ==
For her literary work, Anđelka Martić was awarded the Yugoslav Order of Labor with Golden Wreath. In 1973, she received the Order of the Smile, a unique decoration awarded on behalf of the children of Poland. In 1977 Martić received Ivana Brlić Mažuranić Award for her book Djedica Pričalo i čarobni vrutak.
