= 2009 swine flu pandemic in Croatia =

2009 flu pandemic in Croatia Pandemija svinjske gripe u Hrvatskoj 2009. (in Croatian)
- Disease: Swine Flu
- Pathogen: H1N1
- Location: Croatia
- First outbreak: Australia
- Index case: Zagreb
- Arrival date: 3 July 2009
- Confirmed cases: 526
- Deaths: 22

The 2009 flu pandemic in Croatia or 2009 swine flu in Croatia (Croatian: Pandemija gripe u Hrvatskoj 2009; Pandemija svinjske gripe u Hrvatskoj 2009.) was a pandemic event in Croatia during the 2009 swine flu pandemic.

The trail of the 2009 flu pandemic had left 526 people infected and 22 died from the disease.

== Background ==
On 29 April it was announced that a 22-year-old traveler from Florida had been held in quarantine in Osijek, Croatia under suspicion of swine flu. Later that day, however, the Director of Infectious Disease Epidemiology Agency, Dr. Ira Gjenero Margan, stated results of the testing for swine flu were negative "with 99% certainty". On 30 April, a child was held in quarantine in Zagreb but the results were negative. On 15 June, health minister Darko Milinovic confirmed the first case of swine flu in Croatia; however a few hours later he said that a laboratory in London, United Kingdom, had cross-contaminated the samples and thus created a false positive result, meaning that there were no infections in Croatia.

== History ==
The first case was Laboratory confirmed on 3 July. The patient was a 60-year-old woman, who came from Australia. On 31 October, a 61-year-old man from Split became the first patient in Croatia to die because of swine flu.
