= Pitve =

Pitve Pityeia
- Village
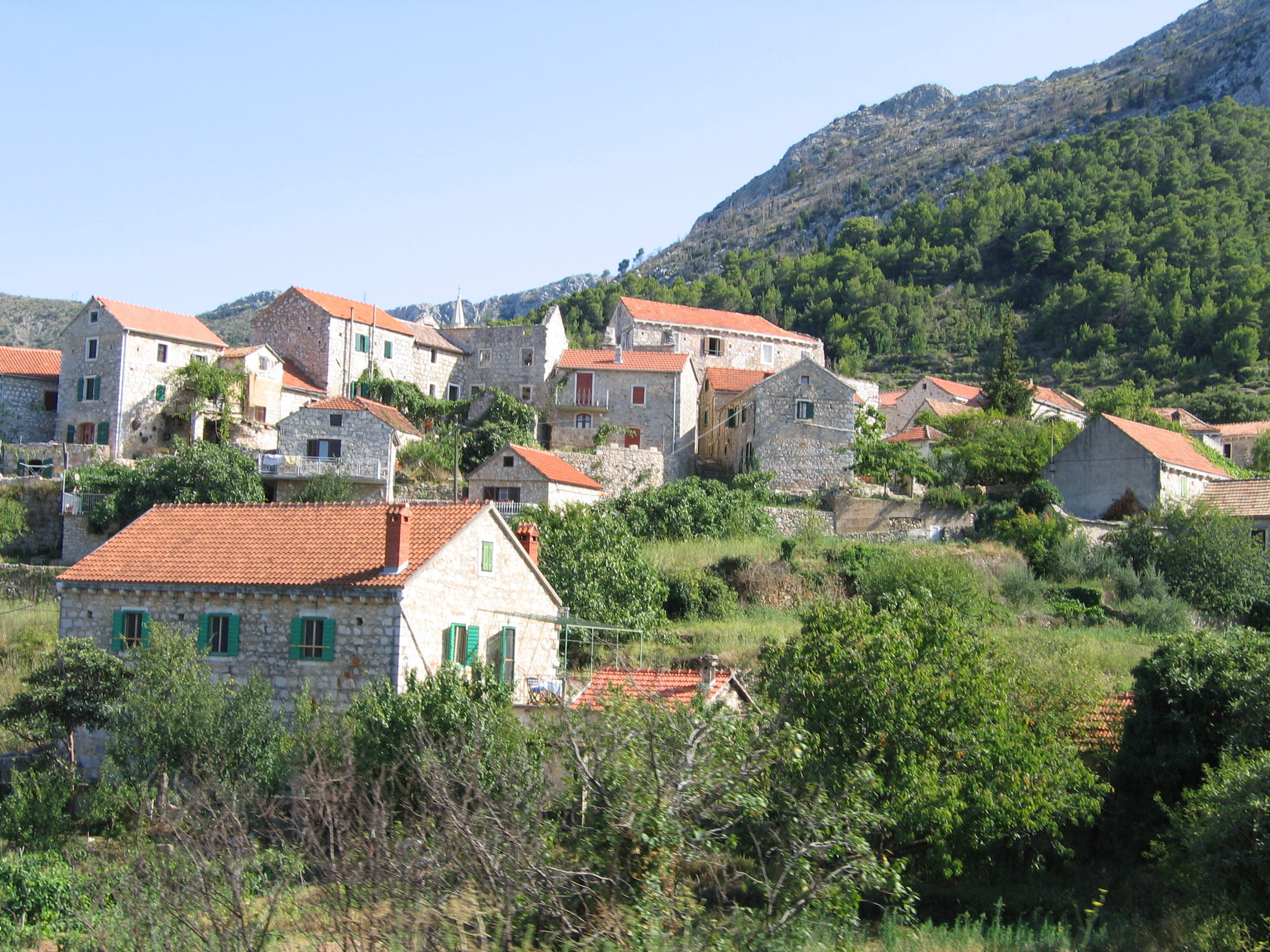
- Pitve

- Location of Pitve within Croatia
- Coordinates: 43°09′07″N 16°40′08″E
- Country: Croatia
- County: Split-Dalmatia County
- Municipality: Jelsa

Area
  - Total: 6.6 km^{2} (2.5 sq mi)
- Elevation: 168 m (551 ft)

Population (2021)
  - Total: 90
  - Density: 14/km^{2} (35/sq mi)
- Time zone: UTC+1 (CET)
  - Summer (DST): UTC+2 (CEST)
- Postal code: 21465 Pitve
- Area code: +385 (0)21

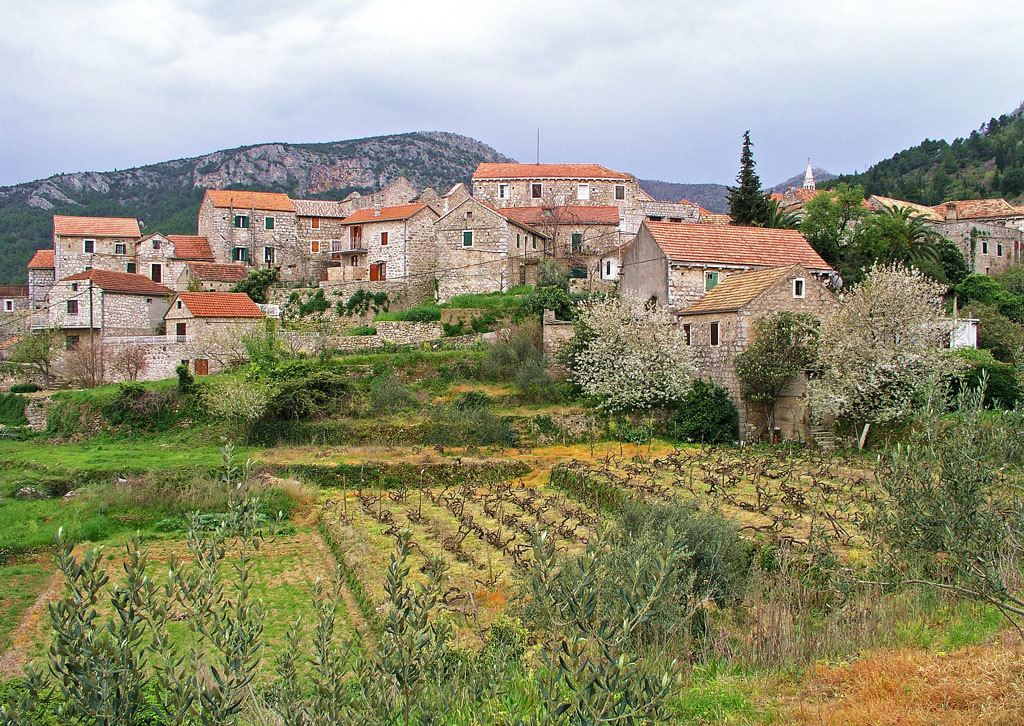
Pitve

Pitve is a settlement on the island of Hvar, in the district of Jelsa. It lies 168 metres above sea-level on the northern side of the island, in the hills above Jelsa.

The road from Jelsa and Vrisnik goes through the 1,500 metre long Pitve tunnel to reach Zavala on the south side of the island.

== Name ==
Pitve is derived from Pityeia, which is the oldest-known name for the island. It was mentioned as being one of the Liburnian isles, along with Issa (Vis) and Dysceladus, and is associated with pine woods.

== History ==
Pitve is one of the oldest continuously occupied settlements on the island. It is a village in two parts: the upper, older section known as Gornje Pitve, and a newer, lower part known as Donje Pitve. Gornje Pitve was founded by the Liburnians, an ancient Illyrian tribe who inhabited the island before the arrival of the ancient Greeks in 384 B.C. At that time, the name for the entire island was Pityeia. Donje Pitve dates from the 15th and early 16th century, when there was an influx of people from the mainland escaping the invading Turks.

Between Upper and Lower Pitve lie the old school (today a wine cooperative), the parish church of St James (Sv Jakov), a cemetery, and the former library and economic home that are no longer in use.

The fishing port for Pitve was mentioned in the Hvar Statute of 1331 as Portus de Pitue, and is now known as Jelsa.

== Location/geography ==
Pitve lies at the top of a valley below the cliff called Samotorac at the entrance to the Vratnik pass.

== Culture ==
The patron saint of Pitve is St James (Sv Jakov). On Holy Thursday, Pitve is one of the places that participates in the traditional procession "Za križen", or "Following the Cross".

== Sport ==
Pitve's football club is known as NK Poskok – the Vipers.

== Population ==
Beginning with the census of 1991, the population figures for Pitve reduced as the inhabitants of Zavala were counted as an independent settlement, which contains data for 1857, 1869, 1921 and in 1931.

Population chart 1857-2001

Year	Population
1857	350
1869	446
1880	435
1890	501
1900	569
1910	573
1921	756
1931	579
1948	419
1953	315
1961	264
1971	191
1981	146
1991	112
2001	81

== Notable people from Pitve ==
- Juraj II. Duboković, Bishop of Hvar
- Niko Duboković Nadalini – Shipowner and politician
- Božidar Medvid, -priest, translator, editor, humanitarian, for five years was the parish priest in Pitve
- Tašenka Matulović - writer
