= COVID-19 vaccination in Croatia =

Plan to immunize against COVID-19

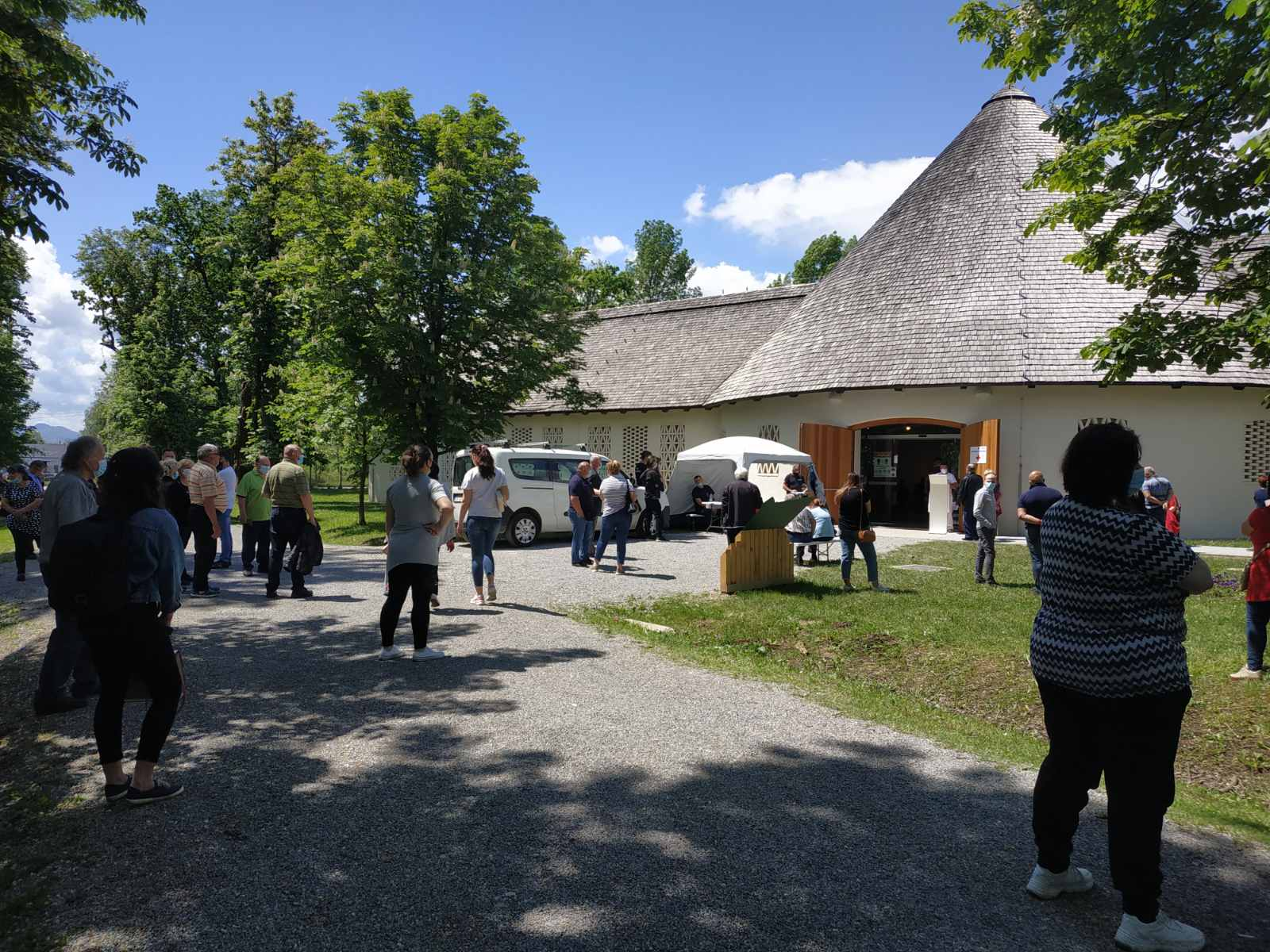
People waiting to receive the vaccine on mass vaccination point in Zaprešić, Croatia

During the COVID-19 pandemic in Croatia, vaccination against COVID-19 began on 27 December 2020. The Croatian government ordered vaccines together with the EU. 8.7 million doses have been ordered. As of 3 February 2022, over 2.2 million people were fully vaccinated, corresponding to a 63% vaccination rate of the country's population.

Vaccines on order
Vaccine	Origin	Doses ordered	Approval	Deployment
Pfizer/BioNTech	US/Germany	1 million	21 December 2020	26 December 2020
Moderna	US	1 million	6 January 2021	12 January 2021
Oxford/AstraZeneca	UK/Sweden	2.7 million	29 January 2021	7 February 2021
Janssen	Netherlands/Israel	900 000	11 March 2021	Pending
Novavax	US		20 December 2021	Pending
CureVac	Germany		Pending	Pending
Valneva	France		Pending	Pending
Sanofi–GSK	France/UK		Pending	Pending
Total		8.7 million		
