= Croatian Institute of Public Health =

Croatian government institute

Croatian Institute of Public Health (Croatian: Hrvatski zavod za javno zdravstvo, HZJZ) is the national institute of public health of Croatia. It operates under the budget of the Ministry of Health.

The institute was first founded in 1893.
