= Charentonne =

River in France

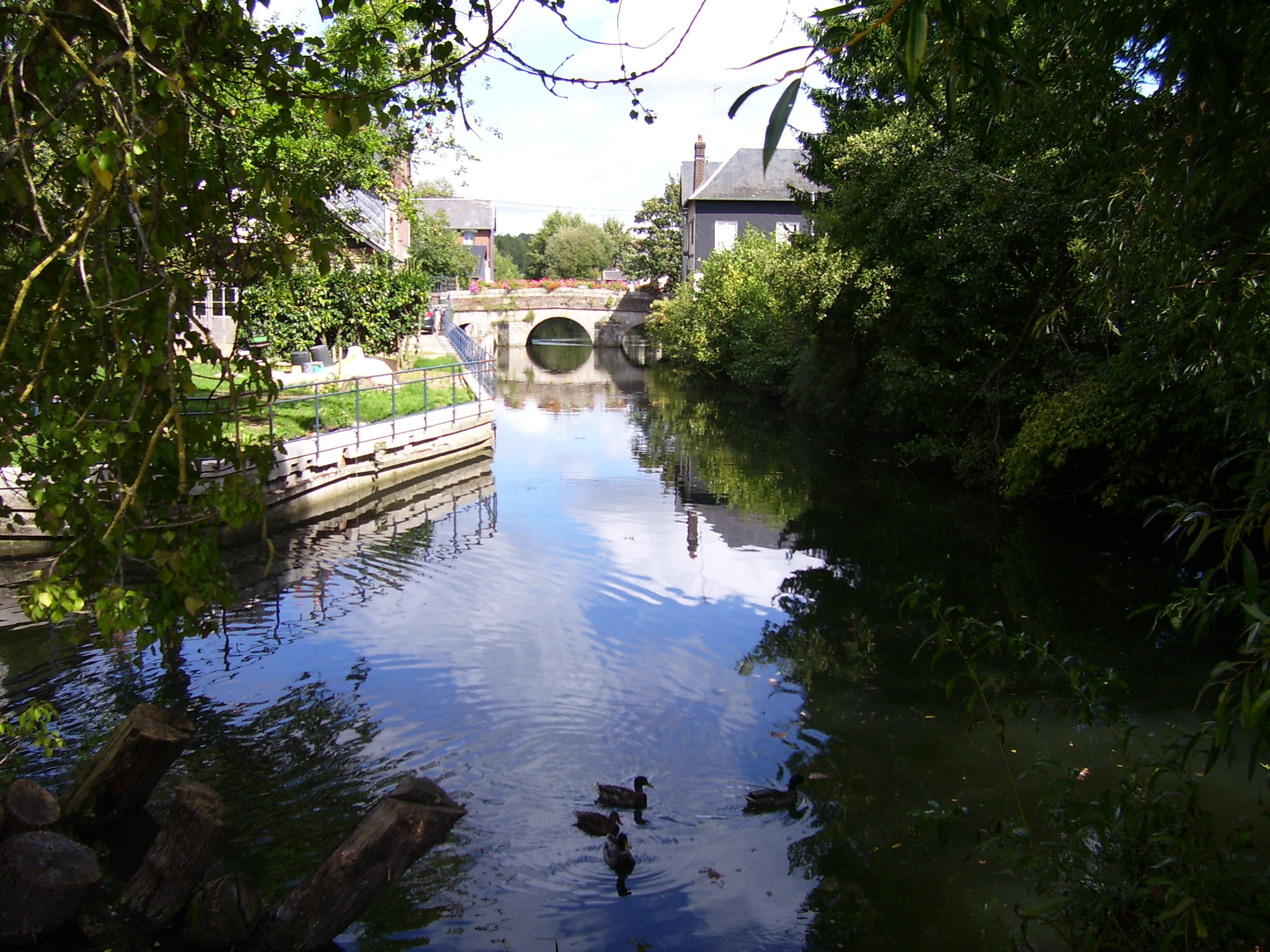
- The Charentonne in Bernay

- Location within France Location within Normandy

Location
- Country: France

Physical characteristics
- Source
  - location: Normandy
- Mouth
  - location: Risle
  - coordinates: 49°7′26″N 0°43′37″E
- Length: 63 km (39 mi)
- Basin size: 513 km^{2} (198 sq mi)
- Discharge
  - average: 4 m^{3}/s (140 cu ft/s)

Basin features
- Progression: Risle→ Seine→ English Channel

The Charentonne (French pronunciation: [ʃaʁɑ̃tɔn]) is a 63 km long river in Normandy, left tributary of the Risle. The river begins in pays d'Ouche (Orne), in the forest of Saint-Évroult, in the south of the Saint-Evroult-Notre-Dame-du-Bois village and the ruins of the abbey where lived and died Orderic Vitalis (1075–1142).

The river runs, in a north-northeast direction, towards the Risle with which it joins at Serquigny.

The Charentonne valley, which separates the Lieuvin plateau and the Ouche plateau has stiff and wooded slopes. The bottom of the valley is covered with clayed alluvions; it is flat and wet, flooded in winter, with beautiful natural meadows, characteristic of Normandy.

The river and surrounding areas are parts of a protected Natura 2000 site called Risle, Guiel, Charentonne.

The Charentonne flows through the following communes: Broglie, Bernay.
