= Berengar (bishop of Venosa) =

Berengar (after 25 December 1096) was the Bishop of Venosa. He is mentioned for the last time at Christmas 1096.

The son of Arnaud d'Échauffour, he became a monk in Saint-Evroul-sur-Ouche as a youth. He was a student of Abbot Thierri.

Berengar joined his uncle, Robert de Grantmesnil, in exile in January 1061, when William II of Normandy banished him for violence. According to Orderic Vitalis, Robert and Berengar stopped in Rome and met Pope Nicholas II. In 1062, Robert founded Sant'Eufemia on land donated by Robert Guiscard in Calabria.

In 1063, the Guiscard granted Berengar the church of SS Trinità di Venosa and made him abbot, an important post, as Venosa was the mausoleum of the Hauteville family. Pope Alexander II confirmed Berengar as abbot and, in 1093 or 1094, Urban II made him bishop.

Berengar is most famous for his writings against Berengar of Tours made between 1078 and 1079. He disputed with him in Rome in those years, when the memorialist was forced to recant. A manuscript of his polemic is preserved in the library of King's College, University of Aberdeen.

== Sources ==
- Ghisalberti, Alberto M. Dizionario Biografico degli Italiani: IX. Rome, 1967.
- Morin, G. "Bérenger contre Bérenger." Récherches de théologie ancienne et médiévale. IV, 2 (1932), pp 109–133.
