= Beaumontel =

- Commune
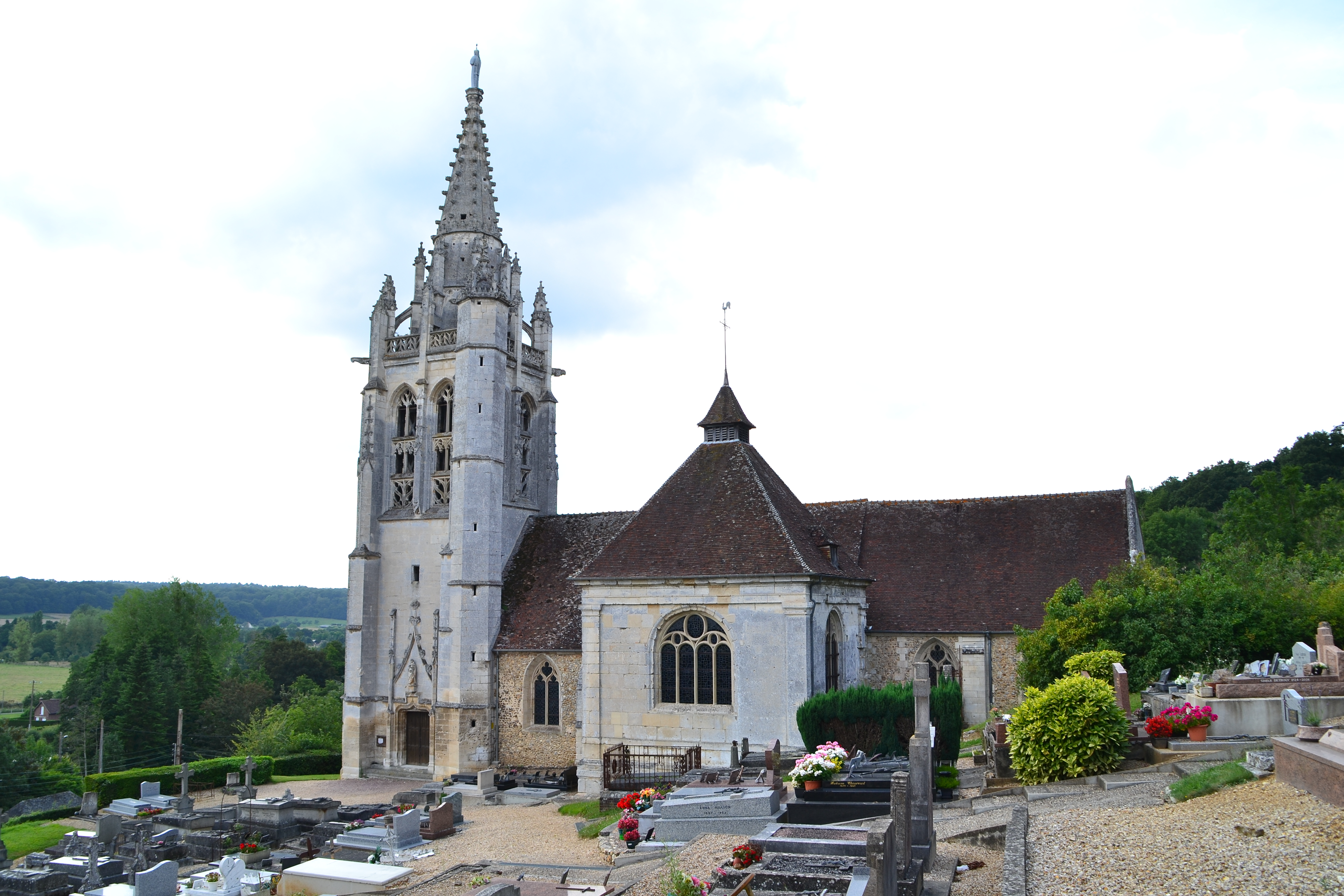
- The church in Beaumontel

- Coat of arms
- Location of Beaumontel
- Location within France Location within Normandy
- Coordinates: 49°05′21″N 0°45′59″E
- Country: France
- Region: Normandy
- Department: Eure
- Arrondissement: Bernay
- Canton: Brionne

Government
  - Mayor (2020–2026): Sylvie Desprès
- Area^{1}: 11.63 km^{2} (4.49 sq mi)
- Elevation: 90 m (300 ft)
- Highest elevation: 160 m (520 ft)
- Lowest elevation: 79 m (259 ft)
- Population (2023): 639
  - Density: 54.9/km^{2} (142/sq mi)
- Time zone: UTC+01:00 (CET)
  - Summer (DST): UTC+02:00 (CEST)
- INSEE/Postal code: 27050 /27170
- ^{1} French Land Register data, which excludes lakes, ponds, glaciers > 1 km^{2} (0.386 sq mi or 247 acres) and river estuaries.

Beaumontel (French pronunciation: [bomɔ̃tɛl]) is a commune in the Eure department in the Normandy region in northern France.

== Location ==
The commune lies on the Risle river, located between the plaine du Neubourg and the forest of Beaumont-le-Roger. The Paris-Cherbourg railway line passes through the commune.

== Geography ==
The commune along with another 69 communes shares part of a 4,747 hectare, Natura 2000 conservation area, called Risle, Guiel, Charentonne.

== History ==
The village was formerly known as Belmontel. The village was originally part of Beaumont-le-Roger and had a common origin in lands belonging to the dukes of Normandy which were given to Judith of Brittany and later, to the monks of Bernay.

From the early 15th century until the French Revolution, the area belonged to the Val family.

== Population ==
Historical population
Year	Pop.	±% p.a.
1968	533	—
1975	617	+2.11%
1982	763	+3.08%
1990	745	−0.30%
1999	715	−0.46%
2007	715	+0.00%
2012	690	−0.71%
2017	657	−0.98%
2023	639	−0.46%
Source: INSEE

== Economy ==
Its local economy is based on flour-milling, the production of charcoal and the manufacture of pasta products.

== Sights ==
- Parc Parissot

== See also ==
- Communes of the Eure department
