= Filippo Anastasio =

Most Reverend Filippo Anastasio
- Titular Patriarch of Antioch; Archbishop Emeritus of Sorrento
- Church: Catholic Church
- See: Latin Patriarchate of Antioch
- In office: 1724–1735
- Predecessor: Giberto Bartolomeo Borromeo
- Successor: Joaquín Fernández de Portocarrero Mendoza
- Previous post: Archbishop of Sorrento (1699–1724)

Orders
- Consecration: 12 April 1699 by Domenico Belisario de Bellis

Personal details
- Born: 27 January 1656 Naples, Italy
- Died: 11 May 1735 (age 79) Sorrento, Italy

Filippo Anastasio (1656–1735) was a Roman Catholic prelate who served as Titular Patriarch of Antioch (1724–1735) and Archbishop of Sorrento (1699–1724).

== Biography ==
Filippo Anastasio was born in Amalfi, Italy on 27 January 1656. On 11 April 1699, he was appointed during the papacy of Pope Innocent XII as Archbishop of Sorrento. On 12 April 1699, he was consecrated bishop by Domenico Belisario de Bellis, Bishop of Molfetta, with Placido Scoppa, Bishop of Venosa, and Tommaso Guzzoni, Bishop of Sora, serving as co-consecrators. He resigned as Archbishop of Sorrento on 13 December 1724. On 20 December 1724, he was appointed during the papacy of Pope Benedict XIII as Titular Patriarch of Antioch. He served as Titular Patriarch of Antioch until his death on 11 May 1735.

== Episcopal succession ==
While bishop, he was the principal consecrator of:

- Ludovico Agnello Anastasio, Archbishop of Sorrento (1724);
- Giulio de Turris, Bishop of Ruvo (1731); and
- Giovanni Antonio Chiaiese, Bishop of Mottola (1731);

== External links and additional sources ==
- Cheney, David M. "Archdiocese of Sorrento–Castellammare di Stabia". Catholic-Hierarchy.org. (for Chronology of Bishops) ^{[self-published]}
- Chow, Gabriel. "Archdiocese of Sorrento–Castellammare di Stabia (Italy)". GCatholic.org. (for Chronology of Bishops) ^{[self-published]}
- Cheney, David M. "Antiochia {Antioch} (Titular See)". Catholic-Hierarchy.org. (for Chronology of Bishops) ^{[self-published]}
- Chow, Gabriel. "Titular Patriarchal See of Antioch (Syria)". GCatholic.org. (for Chronology of Bishops) ^{[self-published]}

Catholic Church titles
Preceded by Diego Petra	Archbishop of Sorrento; 1699–1724	Succeeded by Ludovico Agnello Anastasio
Preceded by Giberto Bartolomeo Borromeo	Titular Patriarch of Antioch; 1724–1735	Succeeded by Joaquín Fernández de Portocarrero Mendoza
