= Sallustio Pecólo =

Italian Roman Catholic prelate

Most Reverend Sallustio Pecólo
- Bishop of Venosa
- Church: Catholic Church
- Diocese: Diocese of Venosa
- In office: 1640–1651
- Predecessor: Gaspare Conturla
- Successor: Antonio Pavonelli

Orders
- Ordination: 28 October 1640
- Consecration: 9 December 1640 by Giulio Cesare Sacchetti

Personal details
- Born: 1600 Terni, Italy
- Died: 7 January 1651 (age 51) Venosa, Italy

Sallustio Pecólo or Sallustio Pecoli (1600 – 7 Jan 1651) was a Roman Catholic prelate who served as Bishop of Venosa (1640–1651).

== Biography ==
Sallustio Pecólo was born in Terni, Italy in 1600 and ordained a priest on 28 October 1640. On 3 December 1640, he was appointed during the papacy of Pope Urban VIII as Bishop of Venosa. On 9 December 1640, he was consecrated bishop by Giulio Cesare Sacchetti, Cardinal-Priest of Santa Susanna, with Leonardo Mocenigo, Archbishop of Candia, and Lelio Falconieri, Titular Archbishop of Thebae, serving as co-consecrators. He served as Bishop of Venosa until his resignation on 13 March 1648. He died on 7 January 1651.

While bishop, he was the principal co-consecrator of Pietro Paolo Russo, Bishop of Nusco (1649).

== External links and additional sources ==
- Cheney, David M. "Diocese of Venosa". Catholic-Hierarchy.org. (for Chronology of Bishops) ^{[self-published]}
- Chow, Gabriel. "Diocese of Venosa". GCatholic.org. (for Chronology of Bishops) ^{[self-published]}

Catholic Church titles
Preceded by Gaspare Conturla	Bishop of Venosa; 1640–1651	Succeeded by Antonio Pavonelli
