= Ebrulf =

Saint Ebrulf
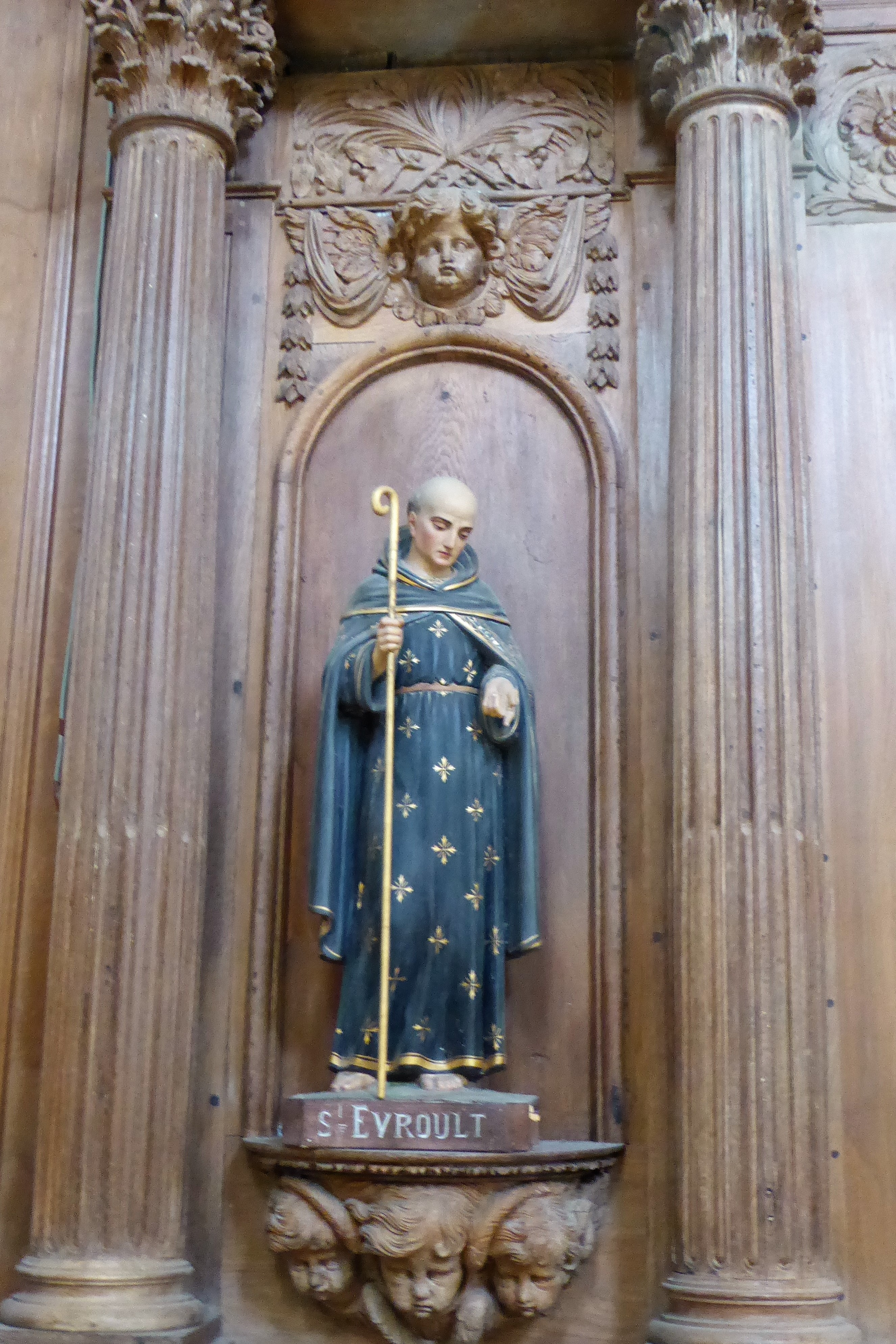
- Statue de Saint Évroult abbatiale de Thiron-Gardais Eure-et-Loir France
- Born: 517; Bayeux or Beauvais
- Died: 596
- Venerated in: Roman Catholic Church, Eastern Orthodox Church, Western Rite Orthodox communities.
- Feast: December 29; August 30 (translation of relics)

Ebrulf (Evroul, Evroult, Ebrulfus, Ebrulphus) (517–596) was a Frankish hermit, abbot, and saint.

== Life ==
Ebrulf was of noble birth, born at Bayeux. He was a courtier at the Merovingian court of Childebert I, serving as a cup-bearer to the king and an administrator of the royal palace. He lived a devout life and wished to become a monk. It was some time before he was given leave to go from court, and both he and his wife took monastic vows.

Ebrulf entered the abbey of Deux Jumeaux before deciding to become a hermit at Exmes, but there, crowds came to visit and ask for his advice, so he and three companions settled in the densely wooded Pays d'Ouche in Normandy. The secluded site spared it the raids of the Northmen.

A legend states that he converted a robber to Christianity when the robber visited the rough settlement that Ebrulf had built near a spring of water, which consisted of a hedge enclosure and wattle and daub huts. The robber warned Ebrulf of the dangers of the forest, but Ebrulf informed him that he feared no one. Repenting of his own sins, the robber brought a gift consisting of three loaves baked in ashes and a honeycomb, and asked to be admitted as a monk.

This settlement became the abbey of Saint-Evroul. He founded other monastic houses, fifteen in total, all of which placed emphasis on manual labor both as a spiritual and economic exercise.) Members of the nobility came to Ebrulf offering him money, land, houses to build monasteries. He founded, after 560, several monasteries in the diocese of Séez; one of them became the important Abbey of St-Martin-de-Séez.

== Veneration ==
He was venerated in England as a result of the Norman invasion, and the link between Ebrulf and England was maintained by the fact that four abbots from Saint-Evroul Abbey ruled English monasteries in the 11th and 12th centuries. They brought to England some of Ebrulf's relics. There was a feast commemorating the translation of his relics kept at Deeping Abbey in England on August 30.

== In literature ==
The Historia Ecclesiastica of the Benedictine chronicler Orderic Vitalis contains the earliest Vita Sancti Ebrulfi (Life of St. Ebrulf). Ebrulf is mentioned in Beroul's Tristan, when Tristan invokes him at the fountain: " Ha ! Dex, beau sire saint Evrol, Je ne pensai faire tel perte." Cardiff Central Library holds a manuscript that contains a "Life" of Ebrulf, possibly compiled for the nuns of Barking Abbey.
