= Giulio Spinola =

Genoese Roman Catholic cardinal

His Eminence Giulio Spinola
- Cardinal, Bishop Emeritus of Lucca
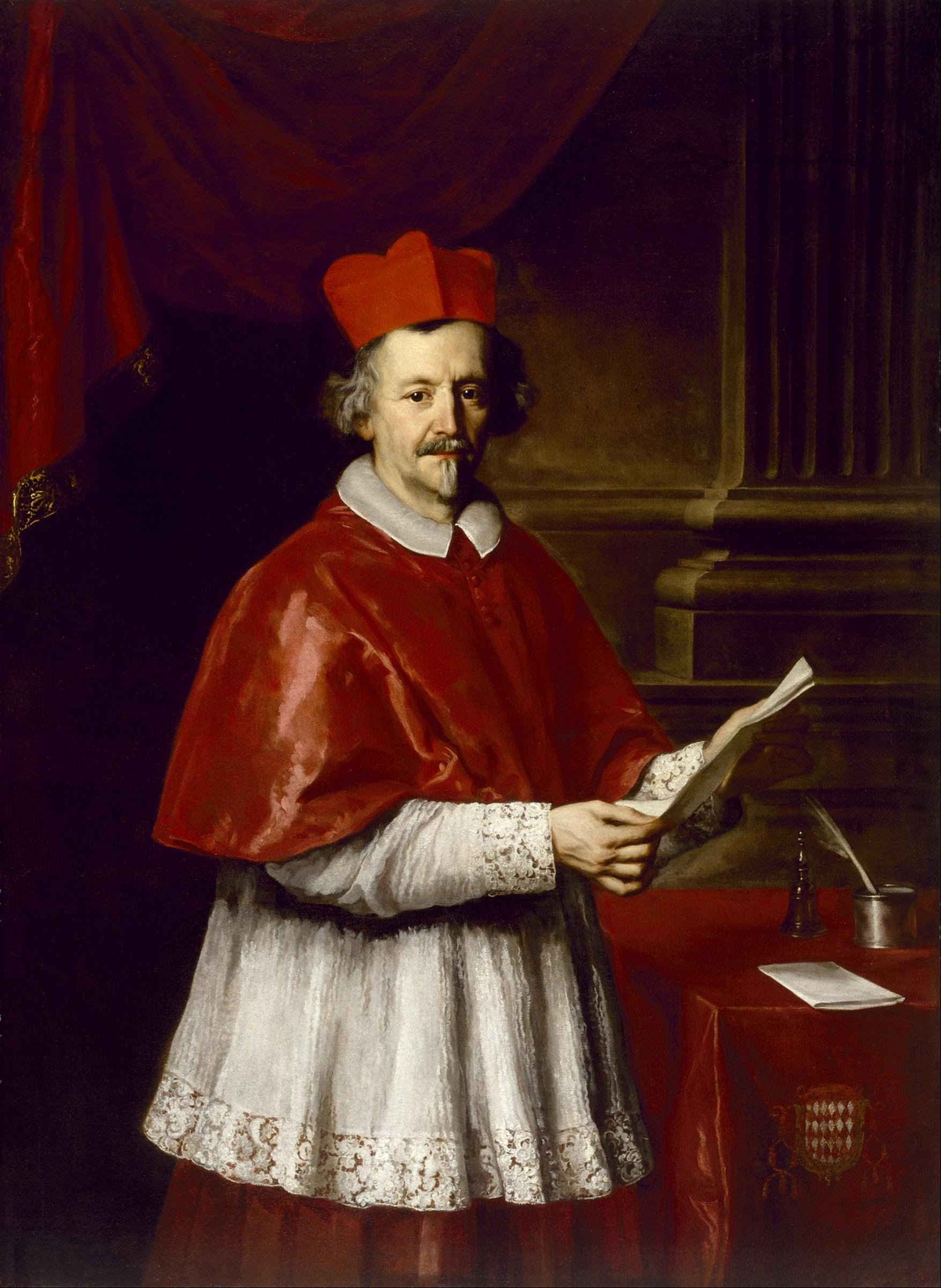
- Church: Roman Catholic
- Diocese: Lucca
- In office: 1677–1690
- Other post: Cardinal-Priest of Santa Prassede (1689–91)
- Previous posts: Cardinal-Priest of Santa Maria in Trastevere (1689–89); Cardinal-Priest of San Crisogono (1684–89); Bishop of Nepi e Sutri (1670–77); Cardinal-Priest of Santi Silvestro e Martino ai Monti (1667–84); Apostolic Nuncio to Austria (1665–67); Apostolic Nuncio to Naples (1658–65); Titular Archbishop of Laodicea in Phrygia (1658–67)

Orders
- Consecration: 10 Feb 1658 by Girolamo Boncompagni
- Created cardinal: 15 February 1666 (In pectore) by Pope Alexander VII

Personal details
- Born: 13 May 1612 Genoa, Republic of Genoa
- Died: 11 March 1691 (age 78) Rome, Papal States
- Buried: Sant'Andrea al Quirinale

Giulio Spinola (13 May 1612 – 11 March 1691) was a Genoese Roman Catholic cardinal.

== Biography ==
He was born in Genoa, the eldest of nine children to Giovambatista and Isabella Spinola. He obtained doctorates in Law (1636) and Theology, and held some administrative offices during the pontificate of Urban VIII.

He was named Titular Archbishop of Laodicea in Phrygia on 14 January 1658. On 10 Feb 1658, he was consecrated bishop by Girolamo Boncompagni, Archbishop of Bologna, with Tommaso Carafa, Bishop of Capaccio, and Bartolomeo Cresconi, Bishop of Caserta, serving as co-consecrators. He was Nuncio to Naples, and then Nuncio to Austria. He was created Cardinal on 15 February 1666 by Alexander VII, and was later appointed to the Diocese of Nepi e Sutri, and later to Lucca.

He resigned from his diocese in 1690 for health reasons and retired to Rome. He died on 11 March 1691 during the papal conclave.

== Episcopal succession ==
While bishop, he was the principal consecrator of:

- Casimirus Damokos, Titular Bishop of Coronea and Vicar Apostolic of Transilvania, Erdély, Siebenbürgen (1668);
- Virginio Orsini (cardinal), Cardinal-Bishop of Albano (1671);
- Luca Tisbia, Bishop of Trevico (1671);
- Giovanni Geronimo Doria, Bishop of Nebbio (1671);
- Giovanni Battista Falvo, Bishop of Marsico Nuovo (1671);
- Giovanni Battista Desio, Bishop of Venosa (1674); and
- Raffaele Riario Di Saono, Bishop of Montepeloso (1674).
