= Bernay, Eure =

Bernay
- Subprefecture and commune
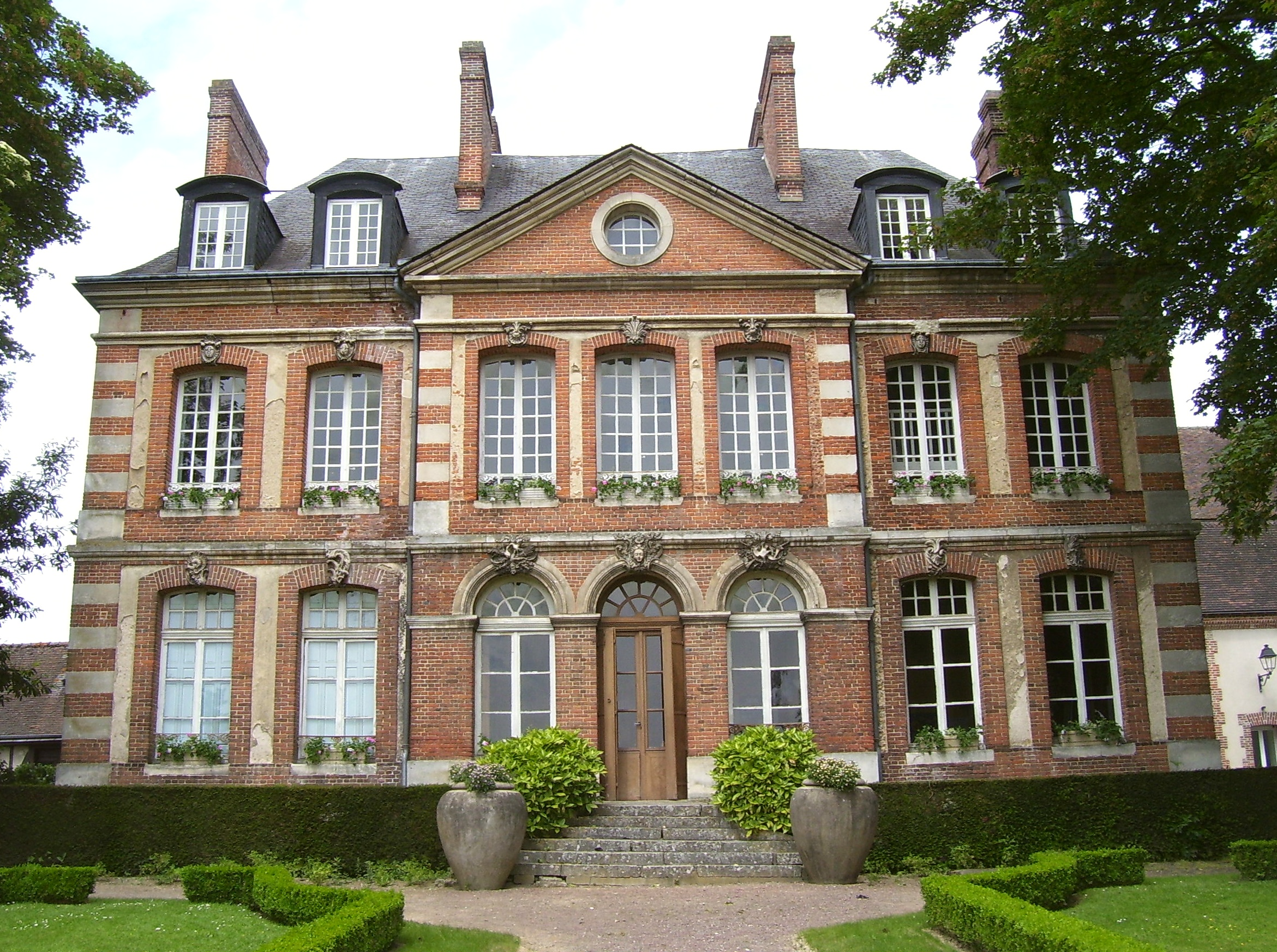
- Hôtel de la Gabelle

- Coat of arms
- Location of Bernay
- Location within France Location within Normandy
- Coordinates: 49°05′N 0°36′E
- Country: France
- Region: Normandy
- Department: Eure
- Arrondissement: Bernay
- Canton: Bernay
- Intercommunality: Intercom Bernay Terres de Normandie

Government
  - Mayor (2020–2026): Marie-Lyne Vagner
- Area^{1}: 24.03 km^{2} (9.28 sq mi)
- Elevation: 108 m (354 ft)
- Highest elevation: 173 m (568 ft)
- Lowest elevation: 87 m (285 ft)
- Population (2023): 9,765
  - Density: 406.4/km^{2} (1,052/sq mi)
- Time zone: UTC+01:00 (CET)
  - Summer (DST): UTC+02:00 (CEST)
- INSEE/Postal code: 27056 /27300
- ^{1} French Land Register data, which excludes lakes, ponds, glaciers > 1 km^{2} (0.386 sq mi or 247 acres) and river estuaries.

Bernay (French pronunciation: [bɛʁnɛ]) is a commune in the west of the Eure department in Northern France.

In 2012, Bernay was designated one of the French Towns and Lands of Art and History.

== Geography ==
Bernay is in the valley of the Charentonne, a tributary of the Risle, about 50 km (31 mi) west from Évreux. The city is on the border of the Pays d'Ouche and the Lieuvin. Bernay station has rail connections to Caen, Évreux, Paris, Rouen, Deauville and Lisieux.

The commune along with another 69 communes shares part of a 4,747 hectare, Natura 2000 conservation area, called Risle, Guiel, Charentonne.

== History ==
The name Bernay is rooted in 5th century Roman settlement Brinnacu, from the Latin Brinnacum ("braided"), reflecting the marshy braided river land that the original settlement was built on. The city has expanded around the River Charentonne, shielded by the incline to highlands ("les Monts") at the top of the Charentonne valley. The town has grown to encompass a portion of the smaller Cosnier, a tributary of the Charentonne.

Between 996 and 1008, Duke of Normandy Richard II offered this area in dowry to his wife, Judith of Brittany, who then provided for the building of a Benedictine abbey. The monks used the rivers flowing through the area for industry, for example cleansing, mills and fisheries. The abbey still stands, an example of Norman Romanesque architecture. To cover their expenses and to assure their protection, the monks yielded a part of the property in 1048. The veneration of "Notre-Dame de la Couture" (13th century) is the starting-point of important pilgrimages, which attract people from across Normandy; the diocesan Marian pilgrimage still takes place each Whit Monday.

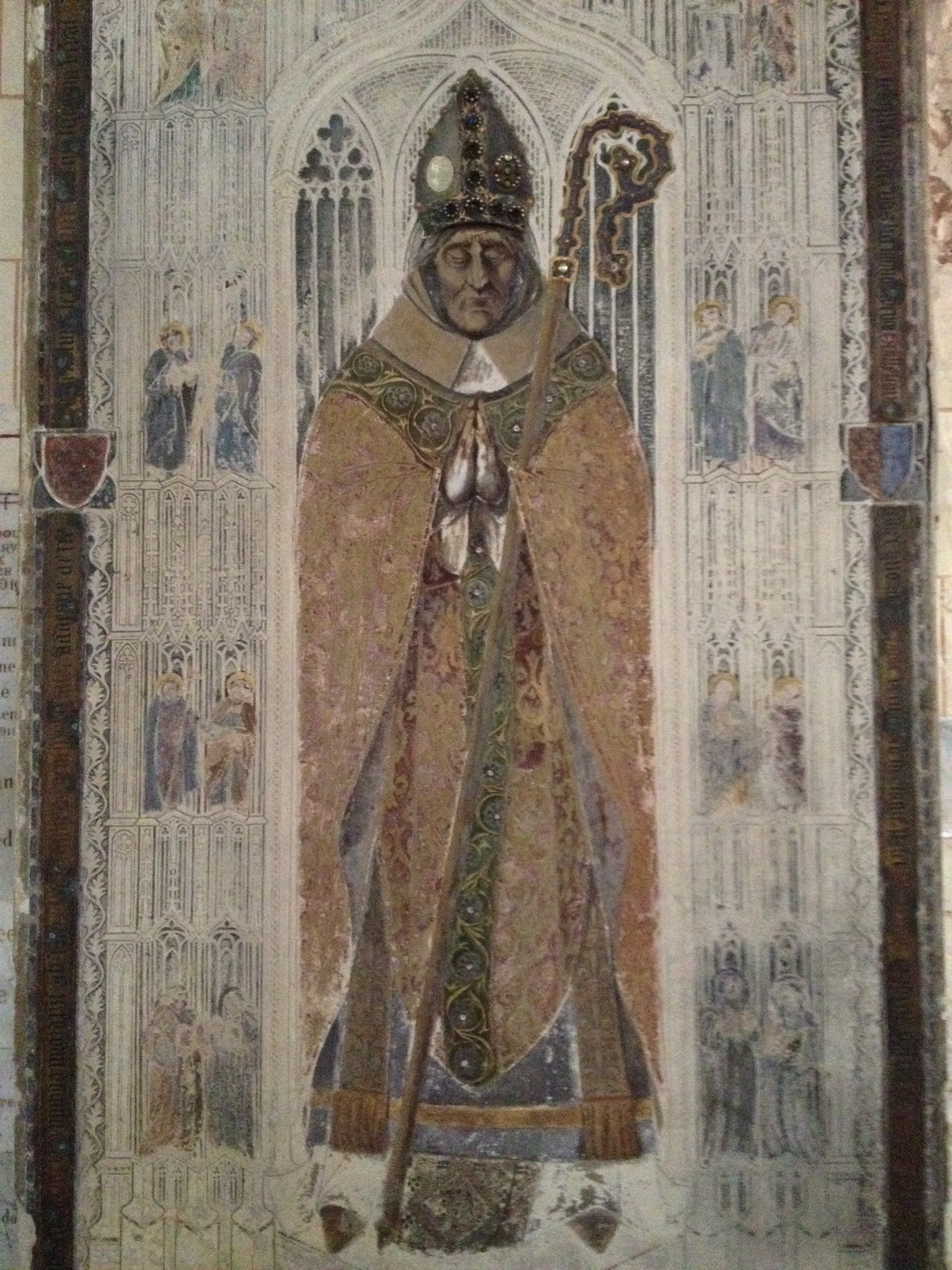
Funerary slab of Abbot Guillaume d'Auvillars of Bec

The 15th-century parish church of Sainte-Croix contains a main altar and a quantity of statuary, including the funerary slabs of five abbots, transferred here from Bec Abbey after it was suppressed in 1792 during the French Revolution.

The town is known for its cloth industry. Because of the diversity and abundance of the agricultural produce of the area, the town has a history of hosting market fairs, such as the "Foire Fleurie" each Palm Sunday. Bernay holds a large street market each Saturday, which takes over much of the old part of the town.

During the 19th century, when the road system was modernized, most industrial development moved to the outskirts of the town. During the 20th century, the arrival of new industries continued the outward expansion of Bernay, which now includes the slopes overlooking the historical city centre, which has maintained many of its original buildings.

In August 1944, during World War II, the First Canadian Army advanced east towards the Seine following the successful Operation Tractable. The Canadians liberated Bernay, which escaped damage from the Canadian bombardment of the area thanks to a thick layer of cloud, thus preserving the historical city centre.

== Population ==
Historical population

Year	Pop.	±% p.a.
1793	5,705	—
1800	6,271	+1.36%
1806	6,521	+0.65%
1821	6,332	−0.20%
1831	6,605	+0.42%
1836	7,244	+1.86%
1841	6,871	−1.05%
1846	7,512	+1.80%
1851	7,362	−0.40%
1856	7,237	−0.34%
1861	7,566	+0.89%
1866	7,510	−0.15%
1872	7,281	−0.51%
1876	7,643	+1.22%
1881	7,989	+0.89%
1886	8,310	+0.79%
1891	8,016	−0.72%
1896	7,966	−0.13%
1901	8,159	+0.48%

Year	Pop.	±% p.a.
1906	8,115	−0.11%
1911	7,883	−0.58%
1921	7,440	−0.58%
1926	7,587	+0.39%
1931	7,700	+0.30%
1936	7,783	+0.21%
1946	8,174	+0.49%
1954	8,798	+0.92%
1962	9,349	+0.76%
1968	10,009	+1.14%
1975	10,539	+0.74%
1982	10,548	+0.01%
1990	10,582	+0.04%
1999	11,024	+0.46%
2007	10,434	−0.69%
2012	10,399	−0.07%
2017	10,085	−0.61%
2023	9,765	−0.54%

Source: EHESS and INSEE (1968-2023)

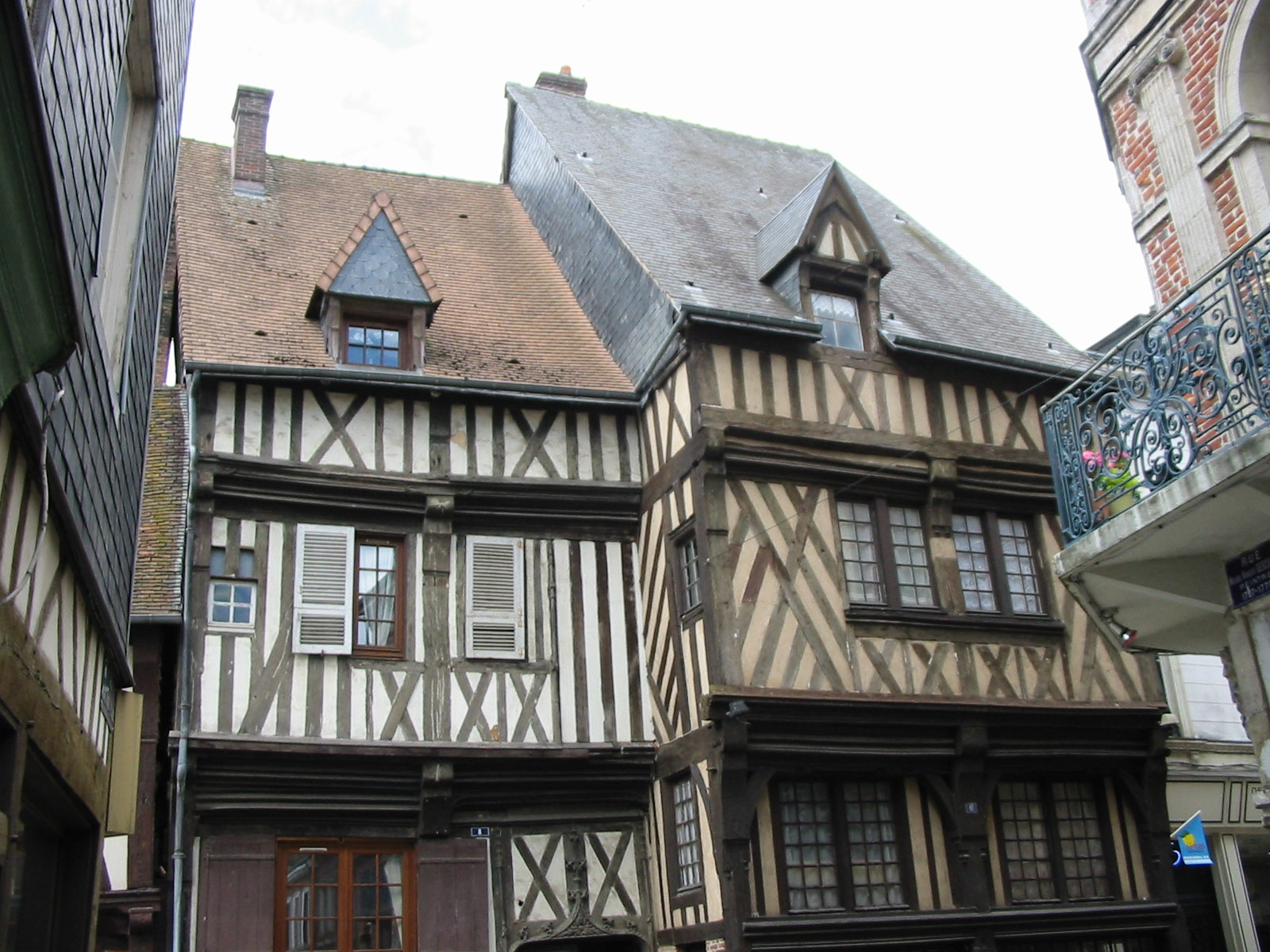
Timber-framed houses in Bernay

== People ==
- Romuald Boco, soccer player
- Edith Piaf, singer, lived with her Bernay-based grandmother shortly after her birth
- Olivier Picard, archaeologist

== Sister cities ==
Bernay has four international sister cities:

- (United Kingdom) Haslemere
- (Germany) Cloppenburg
- (United States) Jennings, Louisiana
- (United States) Canal Winchester, Ohio

== See also ==
- Communes of the Eure department
