= Saint-Evroult-Notre-Dame-du-Bois =

Saint-Évroult-Notre-Dame-du-Bois
- Commune
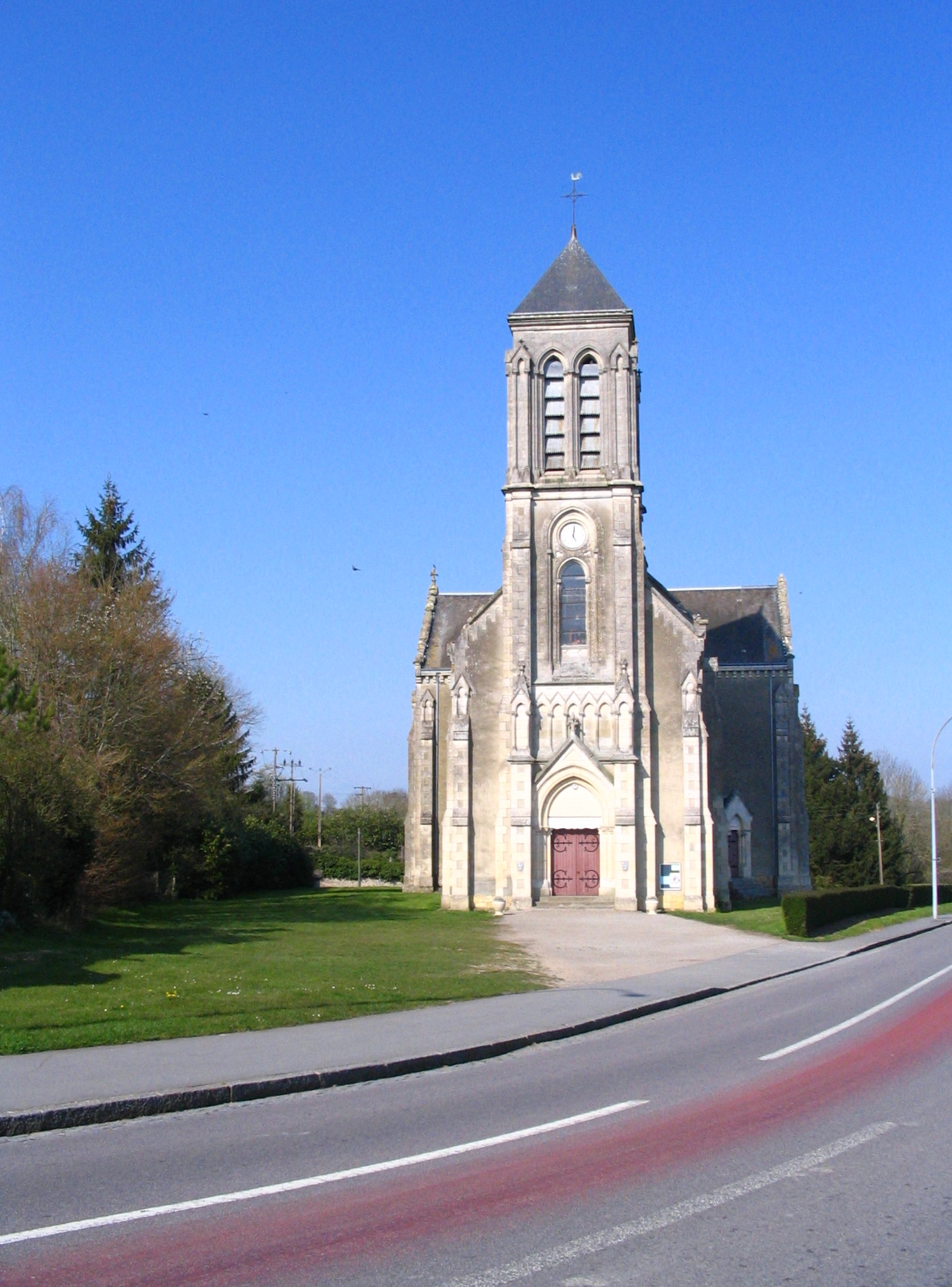
- The church in Saint-Evroult-Notre-Dame-du-Bois
- Location of Saint-Évroult-Notre-Dame-du-Bois
- Location within France Location within Normandy
- Coordinates: 48°47′32″N 0°27′45″E
- Country: France
- Region: Normandy
- Department: Orne
- Arrondissement: Mortagne-au-Perche
- Canton: Rai

Government
  - Mayor (2020–2026): Hervé Harel
- Area^{1}: 34.47 km^{2} (13.31 sq mi)
- Elevation: 272 m (892 ft)
- Highest elevation: 331 m (1,086 ft)
- Lowest elevation: 222 m (728 ft)
- Population (2023): 440
  - Density: 13/km^{2} (33/sq mi)
- Time zone: UTC+01:00 (CET)
  - Summer (DST): UTC+02:00 (CEST)
- INSEE/Postal code: 61386 /61550
- ^{1} French Land Register data, which excludes lakes, ponds, glaciers > 1 km^{2} (0.386 sq mi or 247 acres) and river estuaries.

Saint-Evroult-Notre-Dame-du-Bois (French pronunciation: [sɛ̃t‿evʁu nɔtʁə dam dy bwa]) is a commune in the Orne department in north-western France. The commune has the longest name of all the communes within the Orne department.

== Geography ==
The Commune is one of 27 communes that make up the Natura 2000 protected area of Bocages et vergers du sud Pays d'Auge.

The commune contains the source of the river Charentonne. In addition The Touquettes river flows through the commune, along with three streams the Ruisseau de Corru, Ruisseau des Vaux and Ruisseau de Brequigny.

== Points of interest ==
=== National heritage sites ===
- Abbey of Saint-Evroul are a set of Abbey ruins registered as a Monument historique in 1967.

== Notable people ==
- Ebrulf - (517–596) a Frankish hermit, abbot, and saint, founded the Abbey here in the 7th Century.

== See also ==
- Communes of the Orne department
- The website of Saint-Evroult-Notre-Dame-du-Bois
