= Abbey of Saint-Evroul =

Church in Normandy, France

Ouche Abbey
- French: Abbaye d'Ouche; French: Abbaye de Saint-Évroult; Medieval Latin: Sanctus Ebrulphus Uticensis
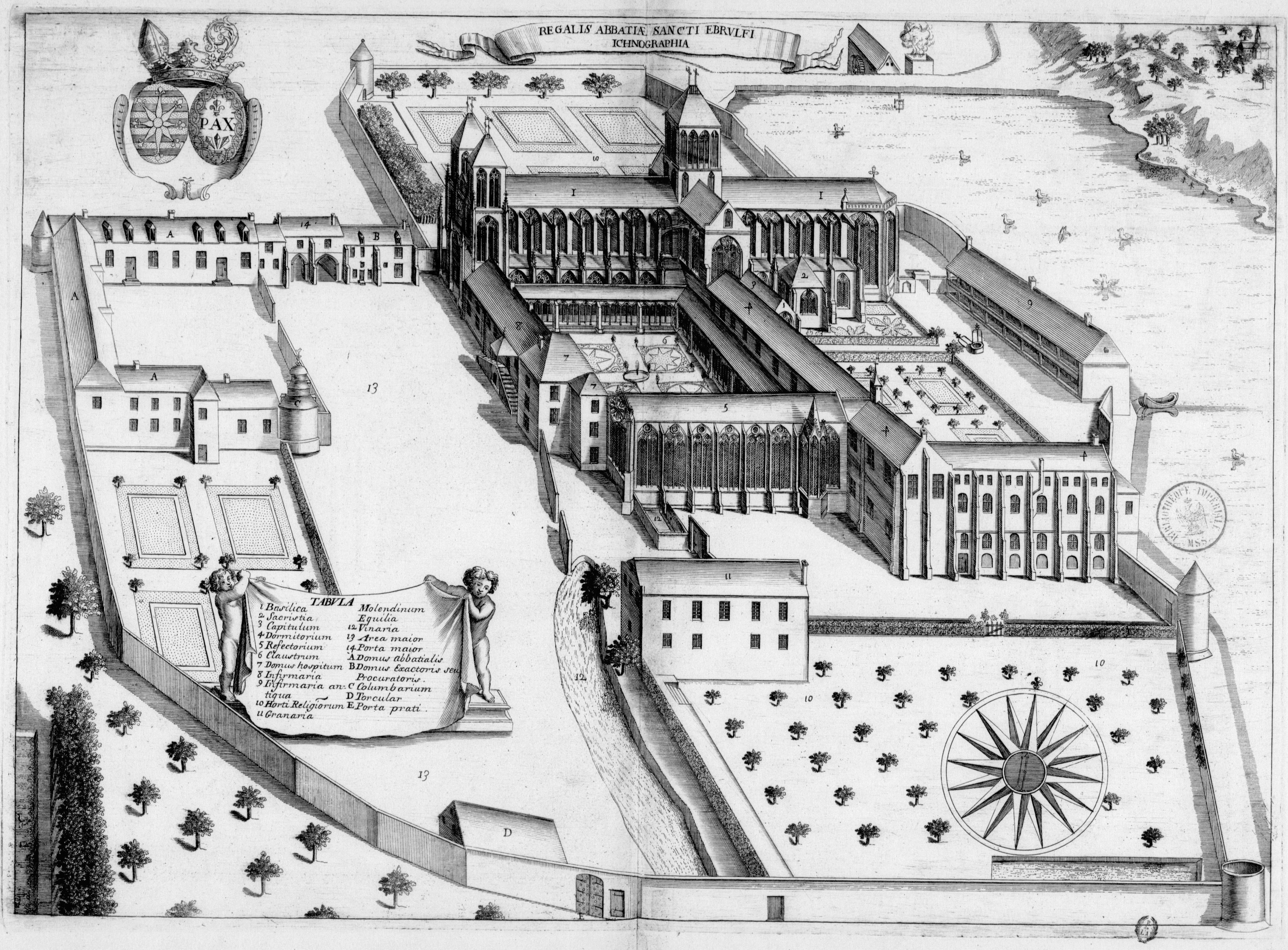
- 17th-century engraving of the abbey (Monasticon Gallicanum)
- Interactive map of Ouche Abbey

Monastery information
- Full name: Abbey of Saint Évroult in Ouche
- Other names: Abbey of Saint-Évroult; Abbaye de Saint-Évroult-en-Ouche; Abbaye de Saint-Evroul-en-Ouche; Sanctus Ebrulfus
- Order: Benedictine
- Denomination: Catholic
- Established: 567; 1050 (restored)
- Disestablished: 21 September 1789
- Dedication: Saint Peter, Évroult
- Diocese: Lisieux (until 1792); Séez

People
- Founders: Évroult; William Giroie and Robert and Hugh de Grandmesnil (restoration)

Architecture
- Status: Closed
- Functional status: Abbey
- Style: Gothic

Site
- Location: Saint-Evroult-Notre-Dame-du-Bois, Orne, Normandy
- Country: France
- Coordinates: 48°47′26″N 0°27′50″E
- Visible remains: Ruins, some intact buildings
- Public access: No

Monument historique
- Official name: Ancienne abbaye
- Type: Classé
- Designated: 17 January 1967
- Reference no.: PA00110920

Abbey Church of Our Lady and Saints Peter and Évroult
- French: Abbitale de Notre-Dame et saints Pierre et Évroult
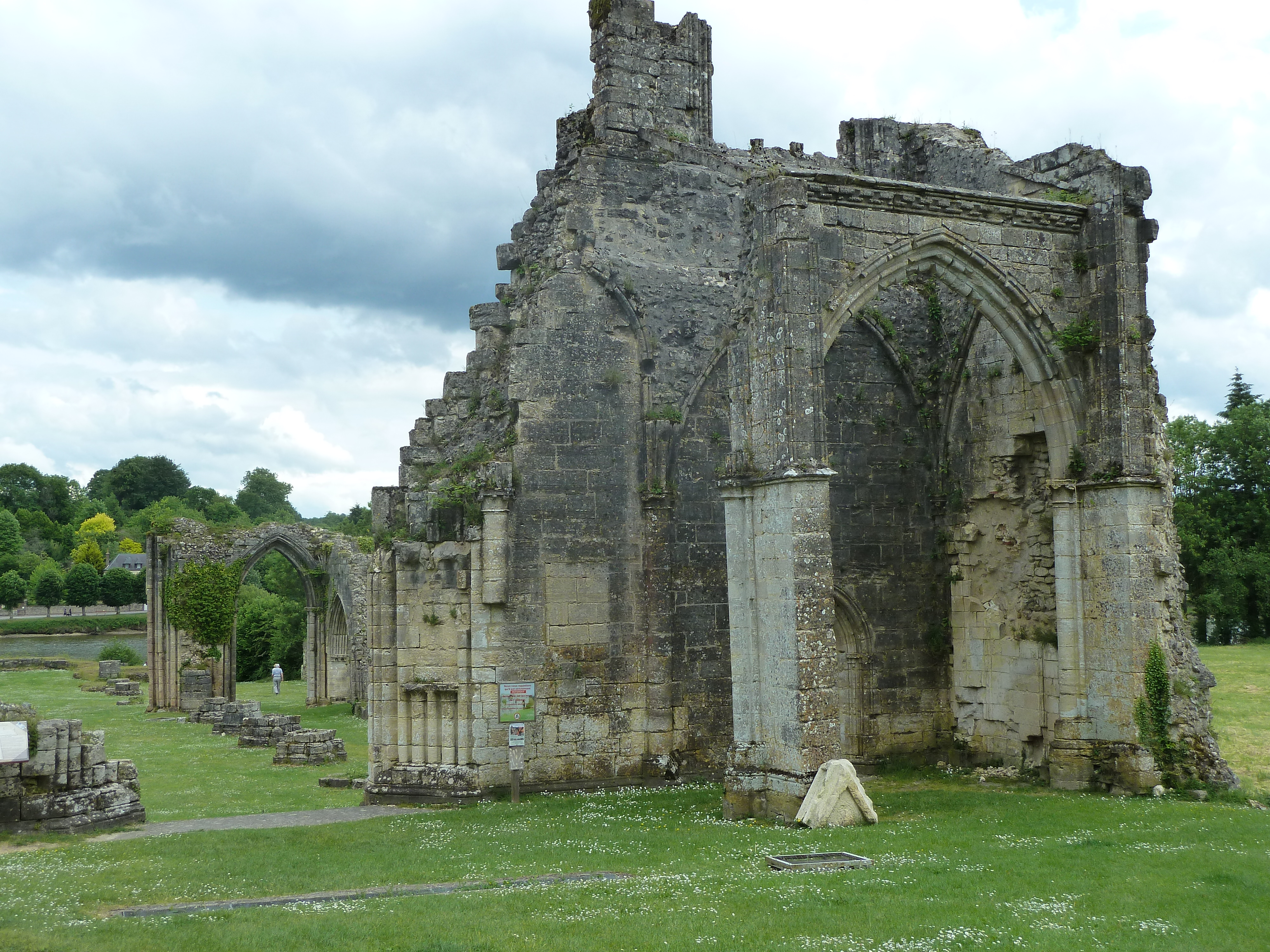
- Ruins of the Abbey Church of Saint-Évroult
- Abbey Church of Our Lady and Saints Peter and Évroult
- Denomination: Catholic

History
- Status: Abbey church
- Dedication: Virgin Mary, Saint Peter, Évroult
- Dedicated: 13 November 1099

Architecture
- Years built: c. 1050–1099; 1231–1284 (rebuilding); 1332 (tower)

Specifications
- Length: 97 m (318 ft 3 in)
- Materials: Stone

Ouche Abbey or the Abbey of Saint-Evroul (French: Abbaye de Saint-Évroult; Medieval Latin: Sanctus Ebrulphus Uticensis) is a former Benedictine abbey in Normandy, located in the present commune of Saint-Évroult-Notre-Dame-du-Bois, Orne, Normandy. It has been classified as a Monument historique since 1967 and is designated "classé".

== History ==
=== Founding ===
The abbey was initially founded as a hermitage in the forest of Ouche by Évroult around 560; by 567 it had become established as an abbey dedicated to Saint Peter, with Évroult presiding over as abbot. However, the abbey does not appear in surviving documents until the reign of Charles the Simple, when it is mentioned c. 900 under the name "monasterio que vocatur Uticus." Beginning in the mid-10th century, the abbey fell into disuse for nearly a century due to the campaigns of the Frankish Duke Hugh the Great.

=== Reestablishment ===
Around the year 1050, the abbey was rebuilt by William Giroie and his nephews, Robert and Hugh de Grandmesnil, with the assistance of both Bec Abbey and Jumièges Abbey. It remained under the patronage of both abbeys as well as the Giroie and de Grandmesnil families throughout the period. The abbey church was dedicated to the Virgin Mary, Saint Peter, and Évroult on 13 November 1099.

The abbey's most famous monk, Orderic Vitalis entered the abbey around this time, taking solemn vows in 1091; his Historia ecclesiastica is an important source for the history of the Norman world, with the sixth volume including a history of the abbey.

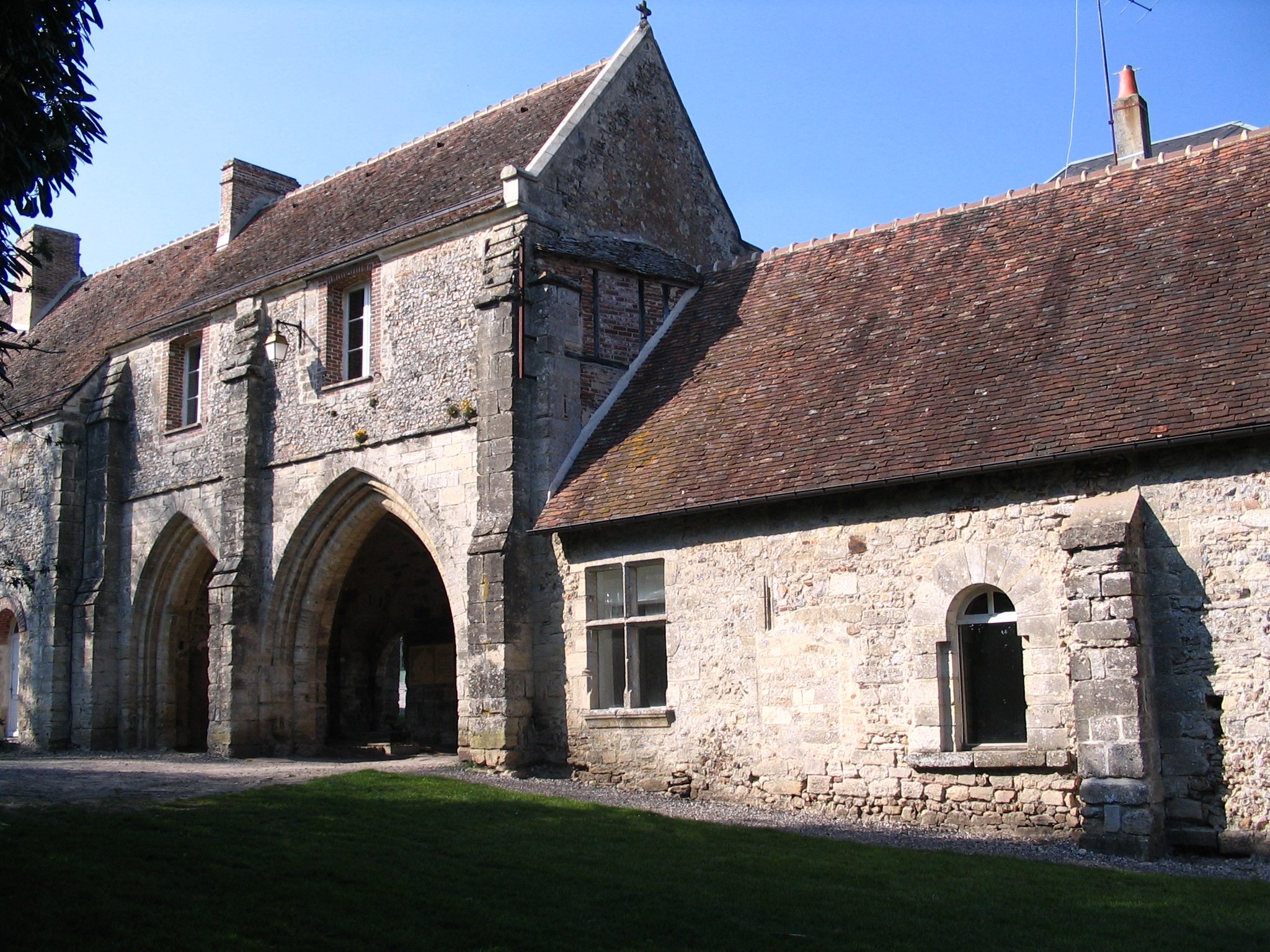
The intact gatehouse of the abbey

Under the abbacy of Roger du Sap, the number of monks increased from 80 to 115, and the abbey founded a priory, Priory of St Martin of Noyon-sur-Andelle, in 1107. At this juncture, many of the monks are said to have "taken the path of the devil" and internal and external dissensions with bishops and temporal lords were frequent. Nevertheless, the abbey was at the peak of its splendour.

=== Decline ===
In 1113, Henry I of England visited the abbey while on campaign against the lords of Bellême. During his visit he granted a charter restoring certain rights to the abbey, however, by the 1120s, many of these rights were abandoned. The abbey and the town beside it were ravaged, first, by the lord of La Ferté-Frênel in 1119 and, second, by the lord of L'Aigle in 1136. The monastic enclave was rebuilt, starting in 1231, with the bulk of the work continuing into 1284. In 1258, during a visit by Eudes Rigaud, the Archbishop of Rouen, the number of monks had decreased to thirty-one, only nine of these being priests. In 1332, the church's tower collapsed and had to be rebuilt. Between 1388 and 1450, conflict again ravaged the abbey, the belligerents this time being English.

Commendatory abbots repeatedly attempted to grab hold of the abbey. Guillaume de Vergy was abbot in said capacity from 1392, but it was revoked by Benedict XIII in 1395. Henry V of England's seizure of alien priories in 1414 included the dependent priory of Ware, which acted as Saint-Evroul's collecting centre, The properties were all transferred to Sheen Priory in the following year, thus depriving Ouche Abbey of its English properties, said to be its main source of income, and bringing in up to £2000 a year. The last regular abbot only held his office in 1484. This placement of the abbacy in commendam stripped the abbey of its most important privileges. Henry II authorized the felling of tree for timber to repair the abbey in 1556. In 1588, the lord of Échauffour burnt down the abbey as revenge against the Catholic League.

In 1628, Saint-Évroult adopted the reforms of the Congregation of Saint Maur, and from 1675 to 1778 Maurist priors expanded and repaired the abbey.

=== Closure ===
On 21 September 1789, the National Assembly declared all church property biens nationaux and the last monks and lay brothers left the abbey. In 1790, the town of Notre-Dame-du-Bois purchased the abbey in order to use the abbey church as the parish church, unfortunately, on 11 March 1802 the transept's tower collapsed, taking with it, the upper vaults and arcades. Subsequently, the buildings were quarried to fuel lime kilns.

== Musical tradition ==
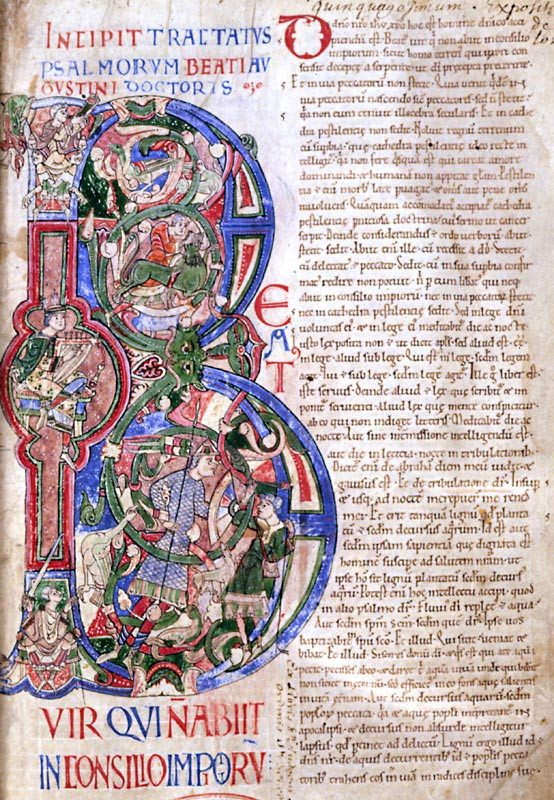
A manuscript from Saint-Evroul depicting King David on the lyre (or harp) in the middle of the back of the initial 'B'.

Normandy was the site of several important developments in the history of classical music in the 11th century. Fécamp Abbey and Saint-Évroult were centres of musical production and education. At Saint-Évroult, a tradition of singing had developed and the choir achieved fame in Normandy. After entering into a violent quarrel with William II of Normandy, Robert de Grantmesnil had been forced to flee to Rome in January 1061 and thence to the court of Robert Guiscard in Salerno, taking with him eleven of his monks, including his nephew Berengar. In his time, Saint-Évroult was famed for its musical programme and these eleven monks brought its musical traditions to the Abbey of Sant'Eufemia in Calabria, a foundation of the Guiscards, of which Robert became abbot.

== Library ==
Beginning with the abbacy of Theodoric, a large amount of copying was done at Saint-Évroult. Orderic Vitalis took a leading role in seeking out and copying manuscripts in abbeys in France and England. Although there were some significant donations, a large quantity of original works were produced during the 12th and 13th centuries. During the 14th century, the scriptorium's activity slowed and by the 15th century had come to a near halt, although some manuscripts were still being produced during the early 16th century. For a while, the monks focused on binding and cataloguing the collection, but this was followed by a period of indifference (with a brief intermission under the Maurists), resulting in the loss of many volumes. Dom Le Michel made the first complete catalogue c. 1640. Around fifty choice volumes were transferred to Saint-Ouen between 1660 and 1682, after which Bellaise wrote a good catalogue of the remaining 159 manuscripts. Unfortunately, the Revolution resulted in further losses.

In 1791, the inventory recorded that the collection had once comprised 4,034 volumes (including 356 manuscripts) and 754 bundles of legal documents. The collection included the Bible in five languages, the works of Augustine and Thomas Aquinas, an illuminated 14th-century lectionary, an 11th-century sacramentary, and musical treatises by Guido of Arezzo.

== Burials ==
- Hugh de Grandmesnil and his wife Adelize

== Illustrious members ==
- Lanfranc, prior of Bec and then of Saint-Évroult, before becoming abbot of Saint-Étienne de Caen and archbishop of Canterbury.
- Robert de Grandmesnil, served as abbot of Saint-Évroult, before serving as abbot of Sant'Eufemia in Calabria. He had become a monk at Saint-Évroult before becoming its abbot.
- Orderic Vitalis, monk of Saint-Évroult, writer of the Historia ecclesiastica.
- Goffredo Malaterra, monk, preacher, and historian, was a monk there in his youth.
- Serlon and Philippe the Baker, who became bishops of Séez.
- Frilion or Foulques, who became abbot of Saint-Pierre-sur-Dives.
- Robert du Chalet, first abbot of Lyre.

== List of abbots ==
List of Abbots

This incomplete list is compiled from the Gallia Christiana and the Normannia monastica.

Regular Abbots:

- Saint Évroult
- Raginger, who attended the Council of Attigny called by Pepin the Short in 765.
- Theodoric (b. Thierry de Mathonville) 1050–1057
- Robert de Grandmesnil 1059–1061
- Osbern of Cormeilles 1061–1066; installed against the wishes of the monks of Saint-Evroul, on the advice of Hugh, bishop of Lisieux.
- Mainier d'Échauffour 1066–1089; was abbot when Orderic Vitalis first arrived at the monastery, and was noted as an attendee at the funeral of William the Conqueror. Responsible for rebuilding much of the abbey and its grounds.
- Serlon of Orgères 1089–1091; his abbacy was spent in conflict with Gilbert Maminot, Hugh's successor as bishop of Lisieux. Would leave the monastery to become bishop of Sées in 1091.
- Roger du Sap 1091–1122; oversaw the consecration of the abbey church begun by Mainer.
- Warin des Essarts 1123–1137
- Richard of Leicester 1137–1140; attended the Second Lateran Council in 1139.
- Renoulf 1140–1159; had been prior of Noyon.
- Bernard 1159–1159; deposed for poor management of the abbey's finances.
- Robert II of Blangy 1159–1177; originally from Bec.
- Raoul of Sainte-Colombe 1177/8–1189
- Richard II 1189–1190
- Renaud 1190–1214; responsible for the translation of the remains of Saint Evroult, Saint Agilus, and Saint Ausbert of Rebais to the abbey.
- Herbert 1217
- Geoffroi 1218
- Robert de Salmonville 1233
- Nicholas 1247; who left to join the Carthusian order.
- Richard of Val-Corjon 1269
- Nicolas de Villiers 1274; abdicated his post.
- William of Montpinçon 1281
- Geoffroi of Girouart 1281–1303
- Thomas of Douet-Artus 1309
- Nicolas of Pont-Chardon 1316
- Raoul Grant 1318; former prior of Ware in England.
- Richard de Tiercelin 1334
- Nicolas Hébert 1352
- Elie Jean du Bois 1366
- Philip the Breton 1392
- Guillaume de Vergy 1392–1395; a commendatory abbot as archbishop of Besançon and a cardinal.
- Robert le Tellier 1395–1408; former prior of Saint-Hymer, regular abbot.
- Michel of Philippe 1439; former prior of Saint-Martin de Noyon-sur-Andelle
- Robert the Apostle 1459
- William de Seilleys 1466
- Jacques of Espinasse 1484; last regular abbot of Saint-Évroult

Commendatory Abbots:

- Auger of Brie 1484–1503; canon of Chartres, Protonotary apostolic, and archdeacon of Rouen.
- George of Amboise 1503; cardinal and archbishop of Rouen, appointed by Pope Pius III.
- Felix of Brie 1503–1546; nephew of Auger of Brie, dean of Le Mans. He found himself in competition with Guillaume of Hellenvilliers, who had been elected by the monks of the abbey.
- Gabriel Le Veneur 1574; Bishop of Evreux.
- Antoine Evrard of Saint-Sulpice; Bishop of Cahors.
- Luigi d'Este 1586; cardinal.
- Antoine de Roquelaure 1588–1595
- François de Sacquépée 1613; of the Premonstratensian Selincourt Abbey.
- Charles, Chaliveau de la Bretonnière 1625; councillor and chaplain of the king.
- Nicolas Aligre ~1638
- Antonio Barberini d. 1671; Italian cardinal, archbishop of Reims, Grand Chaplain of France.
- Guillaume Egon 1671–1689; cardinal, resigned. Died in 1704 as abbot of Saint-Germain-des-Prés.
- François Gobert 1702; Count of Apremont and Reckein, Canon of Strasbourg and Cologne.
- Charles-Philippe Gobert 1703–1719; brother of François Gobert.
- Charles of Saint Aubin 1721–1764; Bishop of Laon, Archbishop of Cambrai.
- Henri-Louis-René des Nos 1764–1769; Bishop of Rennes, Bishop of Verdun.
- François Bareau de Girac 1769–1791, Bishop of Saint-Brieuc, Bishop of Rennes, died in 1820 canon of Saint-Denis.
