= Beuzeville =

- Commune
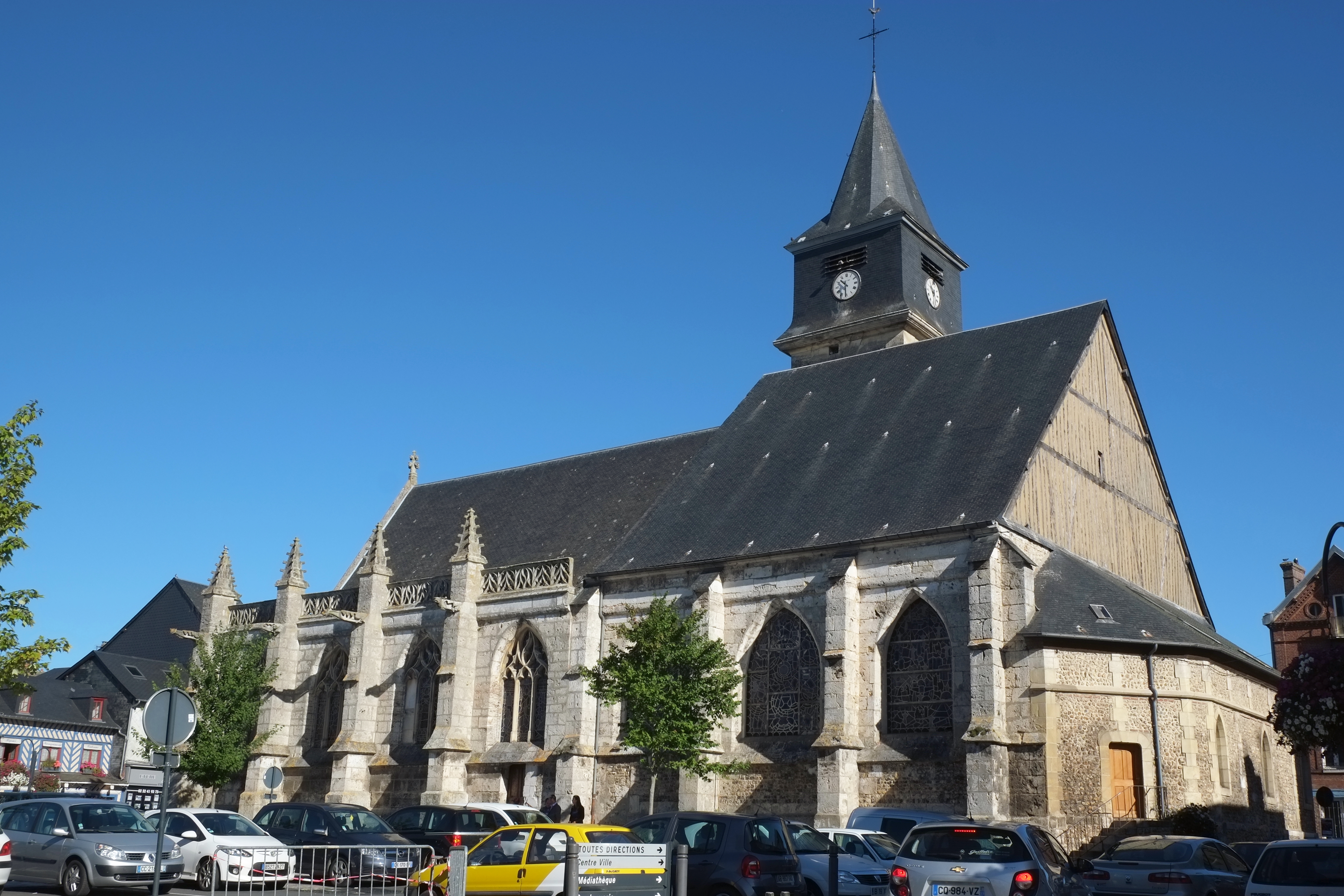
- The church in Beuzeville

- Coat of arms
- Location of Beuzeville
- Location within France Location within Normandy
- Coordinates: 49°20′44″N 0°20′36″E
- Country: France
- Region: Normandy
- Department: Eure
- Arrondissement: Bernay
- Canton: Beuzeville

Government
  - Mayor (2020–2026): Joël Colson
- Area^{1}: 23.25 km^{2} (8.98 sq mi)
- Elevation: 129 m (423 ft)
- Highest elevation: 146 m (479 ft)
- Lowest elevation: 48 m (157 ft)
- Population (2023): 4,704
  - Density: 202.3/km^{2} (524.0/sq mi)
- Time zone: UTC+01:00 (CET)
  - Summer (DST): UTC+02:00 (CEST)
- INSEE/Postal code: 27065 /27210
- ^{1} French Land Register data, which excludes lakes, ponds, glaciers > 1 km^{2} (0.386 sq mi or 247 acres) and river estuaries.

Beuzeville (French pronunciation: [bøzvil]) is a commune in the north-western part of the department of Eure in the Normandy region in northern France.

Located on the Lieuvin plateau, it is adjacent to the communes of Pont-l'Évêque, Honfleur and Deauville. Beuzeville is located just off the A13 freeway close to the Pont de Normandie and the Tancarville Bridge.

== Population ==
Historical population
Year	Pop.	±% p.a.
1968	2,392	—
1975	2,415	+0.14%
1982	2,534	+0.69%
1990	2,702	+0.81%
1999	3,097	+1.53%
2007	3,568	+1.79%
2012	4,409	+4.32%
2017	4,608	+0.89%
2023	4,704	+0.34%
Source: INSEE

== Economy ==
Beuzeville is a market town which is attracting business thanks to its strategic location and good transport links.

== Sights ==
- The church of Saint Helier contains a nationally remarkable collection of 20th century stained glass windows by François Décorchemont (1880-1971), who independently invented a unique way of creating vivid colours in the mediaeval style. The style is more accessible than either the often much more abstract glass of the 20th century, or most 19th century church glass with its invariably more formal subject matter and less vibrant colours. The windows depict, among others, Saints Helier, Joan of Arc, Anselm of Canterbury, Francis of Assisi and Genevieve.

== See also ==
- Communes of the Eure department
