= Lamberto Arbaud =

Most Reverend Lamberto Arbaud
- Bishop of Venosa
- Church: Catholic Church
- Diocese: Diocese of Venosa
- In office: 1510–?
- Successor: Tommaso da San Cipriano

Personal details
- Born: Antibes

Lamberto Arbaud was a Roman Catholic prelate who served as Bishop of Venosa (1510–?).

On 16 November 1510, he was appointed during the papacy of Pope Julius II as Bishop of Venosa. It is uncertain how long he served as Bishop of Venosa. The next bishop of record was Tommaso da San Cipriano who was appointed in 1519.

== External links and additional sources ==
- Cheney, David M. "Diocese of Venosa". Catholic-Hierarchy.org. (for Chronology of Bishops) ^{[self-published]}
- Chow, Gabriel. "Diocese of Venosa". GCatholic.org. (for Chronology of Bishops) ^{[self-published]}

Catholic Church titles
| Preceded by | Bishop of Venosa; 1510–? | Succeeded by Tommaso da San Cipriano |
