= Placido Scoppa =

Italian Roman Catholic Clergyman

Most Reverend Placido Scoppa
- Archbishop (Personal Title) of Venosa
- Church: Catholic Church
- Diocese: Diocese of Venosa
- In office: 1699–1710
- Predecessor: Giovanni Francesco de Lorenzi
- Successor: Giovanni Michele Teroni
- Previous post: Archbishop of Dubrovnik (1693–1699)

Orders
- Ordination: 12 October 1664
- Consecration: 14 June 1693 by Pier Matteo Petrucci

Personal details
- Born: 10 October 1640 Messina, Italy
- Died: December 1710 (age 70) Venosa, Italy

Placido Scoppa, C.R. (10 October 1640 – December 1710) was a Roman Catholic prelate who served as Archbishop (Personal Title) of Venosa (1699–1710) and Archbishop of Dubrovnik (1693–1699).

== Biography ==
Placido Scoppa was born in Messina, Italy on 10 October 1640 and ordained a priest in the Congregation of Clerics Regular of the Divine Providence on 12 October 1664. On 8 June 1693, he was appointed during the papacy of Pope Innocent XII as Archbishop of Dubrovnik. On 14 June 1693, he was consecrated bishop by Pier Matteo Petrucci, Cardinal-Priest of San Marcello, with Giuseppe Felice Barlacci, Bishop Emeritus of Narni, and Francesco Maria Moles, Bishop of Nola, serving as co-consecrators. On 11 April 1699, he was appointed during the papacy of Pope Innocent XII as Archbishop (Personal Title) of Venosa. He served as Archbishop (Personal Title) of Venosa until his death in December 1710.

== Episcopal succession ==
While bishop, he was the principal co-consecrator of:

- Filippo Anastasio, Archbishop of Sorrento (1699);
- Francesco Girgenti, Bishop of Patti (1699);
- Giuseppe Falces, Bishop of Pozzuoli (1699); and
- Vincenzo Corcione, Bishop of Capaccio (1699).

== External links and additional sources ==
- Cheney, David M. "Diocese of Dubrovnik (Ragusa)". Catholic-Hierarchy.org. (for Chronology of Bishops) ^{[self-published]}
- Chow, Gabriel. "Diocese of Dubrovnik (Croatia)". GCatholic.org. (for Chronology of Bishops) ^{[self-published]}
- Cheney, David M. "Diocese of Venosa". Catholic-Hierarchy.org. (for Chronology of Bishops) ^{[self-published]}
- Chow, Gabriel. "Diocese of Venosa". GCatholic.org. (for Chronology of Bishops) ^{[self-published]}

Catholic Church titles
Preceded by Giovanni Vincenzo Lucchesin	Archbishop of Dubrovnik; 1693–1699	Succeeded by Tommaso Antonio Scotti
Preceded by Giovanni Francesco de Lorenzi	Archbishop (Personal Title) of Venosa; 1699–1710	Succeeded by Giovanni Michele Teroni
