= Antonio Pavonelli =

17th-century Roman Catholic bishop

Most Reverend Antonio Pavonelli
- Bishop of Venosa
- Church: Catholic Church
- Diocese: Diocese of Venosa
- In office: 1648–1653
- Predecessor: Sallustio Pecólo
- Successor: Giacinto Tarugi

Orders
- Consecration: 24 May 1648 by Ulderico Carpegna

Personal details
- Born: 1602 Civitella del Tronto, Italy
- Died: 23 Sep 1653 (age 51)

Antonio Pavonelli, O.F.M. Conv. (1602–1653) was a Roman Catholic prelate who served as Bishop of Venosa (1648–1653).

== Biography ==
Antonio Pavonelli was born in Civitella del Tronto, Italy in 1602 and ordained a priest in the Order of Friars Minor Conventual. On 18 May 1648, he was appointed during the papacy of Pope Innocent X as Bishop of Venosa. On 24 May 1648, he was consecrated bishop by Ulderico Carpegna, Cardinal-Priest of Sant'Anastasia, and Giuseppe della Corgna, Bishop of Squillace, and Ranuccio Scotti Douglas, Bishop of Borgo San Donnino, serving as co-consecrators. He served as Bishop of Venosa until his death on 23 Sep 1653.

== External links and additional sources ==
- Cheney, David M. "Diocese of Venosa". Catholic-Hierarchy.org. (for Chronology of Bishops) ^{[self-published]}
- Chow, Gabriel. "Diocese of Venosa". GCatholic.org. (for Chronology of Bishops) ^{[self-published]}

Catholic Church titles
| Preceded by Sallustio Pecólo | Bishop of Venosa; 1648–1653 | Succeeded by Giacinto Tarugi |
