= Guido de' Medici =

Italian Catholic archbishop (died 1537)

Most Reverend Guido de' Medici
- Archbishop of Chieti
- Church: Catholic Church
- Archdiocese: Archdiocese of Chieti
- In office: 1528–1537
- Predecessor: Felice Trofino
- Successor: Gian Pietro Carafa
- Previous post: Bishop of Venosa (1527–1528)

Personal details
- Died: 1537

Guido de' Medici (died 1537) was a Roman Catholic prelate who served as Archbishop of Chieti (1528–1537) and Bishop of Venosa (1527–1528).

== Biography ==
On 12 June 1527, Guido de' Medici was appointed Bishop of Venosa by Pope Clement VII.

On 3 January 1528, he was appointed by Pope Clement VII as Archbishop of Chieti. He served as Archbishop of Chieti until his death in 1537. He was buried in Rome, in the Church of Santa Maria sopra Minerva.

== Bibliography ==
- Pagliucci, Pio (1909). I Castellani del Castel S. Angelo. Vol. I, part 2: "I Castellani Vescovi," (in Italian) (Roma: Polizzi e Valentini 1909), pp. 79–96.
- Salvini, Salvino (1782), Catalogo cronologico de' canonici della chiesa metropolitana fiorentina (Florence: Gaetano Cambiagi), p. 70, no. 480.

Catholic Church titles
Preceded by Tommaso da San Cipriano	Bishop of Venosa; 1527–1528	Succeeded by Fernando de Gerona
Preceded by Felice Trofino	Archbishop of Chieti; 1528–1537	Succeeded by Gian Pietro Carafa
