= Gaspare Conturla =

Italian Roman Catholic prelate

Most Reverend Gaspare Conturla
- Bishop of Venosa
- Church: Catholic Church
- Diocese: Diocese of Venosa
- In office: 1638–1640
- Predecessor: Bartolomeo Frigerio
- Successor: Sallustio Pecólo

Orders
- Consecration: 24 January 1638 by Francesco Maria Brancaccio

Personal details
- Died: 1640 Venosa, Italy

Gaspare Conturla (died 1640) was a Roman Catholic prelate who served as Bishop of Venosa (1638–1640).

== Biography ==
On 15 January 1638, Gaspare Conturla was appointed during the papacy of Pope Urban VIII as Bishop of Venosa. On 24 January 1638, he was consecrated bishop by Francesco Maria Brancaccio, Cardinal-Priest of Santi XII Apostoli, with Alfonso Gonzaga, Titular Archbishop of Rhodus, and Biago Proto de Rubeis, Archbishop of Messina, serving as co-consecrators. He served as Bishop of Venosa until his death in 1640.

== External links and additional sources ==
- Cheney, David M. "Diocese of Venosa". Catholic-Hierarchy.org. (for Chronology of Bishops) ^{[self-published]}
- Chow, Gabriel. "Diocese of Venosa". GCatholic.org. (for Chronology of Bishops) ^{[self-published]}

Catholic Church titles
Preceded by Bartolomeo Frigerio	Bishop of Venosa; 1638–1640	Succeeded by Sallustio Pecólo
