= Giovanni Battista Desio =

Italian Roman Catholic prelate

Most Reverend Giovanni Battista Desio
- Bishop of Venosa
- Church: Catholic Church
- In office: 1674–1677
- Predecessor: Giacinto Tarugi
- Successor: Francesco Maria Neri

Orders
- Ordination: 8 April 1651
- Consecration: 16 May 1674 by Giulio Spinola

Personal details
- Born: 28 April 1628 Naples, Italy
- Died: August 1677 (age 49) Venosa, Italy

Giovanni Battista Desio (1628–1677) was a Roman Catholic prelate who served as Bishop of Venosa (1674–1677).

== Biography ==
Giovanni Battista Desio was born in Naples, Italy on 28 April 1628 and ordained a priest on 8 April 1651.

On 28 April 1628, he was appointed Bishop of Venosa by Pope Urban VIII. On 16 May 1674, he was consecrated bishop by Giulio Spinola, Bishop of Nepi e Sutri, with Giacomo de Angelis, formerly Archbishop of Urbino, and Pier Antonio Capobianco, formerly Bishop of Lacedonia, serving as co-consecrators.

He served as Bishop of Venosa until his death in August 1677.

== External links and additional sources ==
- Cheney, David M. "Diocese of Venosa". Catholic-Hierarchy.org. (for Chronology of Bishops) ^{[self-published]}
- Chow, Gabriel. "Diocese of Venosa". GCatholic.org. (for Chronology of Bishops) ^{[self-published]}

Catholic Church titles
Preceded by Giacinto Tarugi	Bishop of Venosa; 1674–1677	Succeeded by Francesco Maria Neri
