= Giovanni Francesco de Lorenzi =

Italian Roman Catholic prelate

Most Reverend Giovanni Francesco de Lorenzi
- Bishop of Venosa
- Church: Catholic Church
- Diocese: Diocese of Venosa
- In office: 1685–1698
- Predecessor: Francesco Maria Neri
- Successor: Placido Scoppa

Personal details
- Born: 25 March 1635 Ripatransone, Italy
- Died: October 1698 (age 63) Venosa, Italy

Giovanni Francesco de Lorenzi (25 March 1635 – October 1698) was a Roman Catholic prelate who served as Bishop of Venosa (1685–1698).

== Biography ==
Giovanni Francesco de Lorenzi was born in Ripatransone, Italy on 25 March 1635. On 14 May 1685, he was appointed during the papacy of Pope Innocent XI as Bishop of Venosa. He served as Bishop of Venosa until his death in October 1698.

== External links and additional sources ==
- Cheney, David M. "Diocese of Venosa". Catholic-Hierarchy.org. (for Chronology of Bishops) ^{[self-published]}
- Chow, Gabriel. "Diocese of Venosa". GCatholic.org. (for Chronology of Bishops) ^{[self-published]}

Catholic Church titles
Preceded by Francesco Maria Neri	Bishop of Venosa; 1685–1698	Succeeded by Placido Scoppa
