= Bartolomeo Frigerio =

Italian Roman Catholic prelate

Most Reverend Bartolomeo Frigerio
- Bishop of Venosa
- Church: Catholic Church
- In office: 1635–1636
- Predecessor: Andrea Pierbenedetti
- Successor: Gaspare Conturla

Orders
- Consecration: 23 September 1635 by Francesco Maria Brancaccio

Personal details
- Born: 1585 Ferrara, Italy
- Died: 13 November 1636 (age 51) Venosa, Italy

Bartolomeo Frigerio (1585 – 13 November 1636) was a Roman Catholic prelate who served as Bishop of Venosa (1635–1636).

== Biography ==
Bartolomeo Frigerio was born in Ferrara, Italy in 1585.

On 17 September 1635, he was appointed Bishop of Venosa by Pope Urban VIII. On 23 September 1635, he was consecrated bishop by Francesco Maria Brancaccio, Cardinal-Priest of Santi XII Apostoli, with Alessandro Suardi, Bishop of Lucera, and Sigismondo Taddei, Bishop of Bitetto, serving as co-consecrators.

He served as Bishop of Venosa until his death on 13 November 1636.

== External links and additional sources ==
- Cheney, David M. "Diocese of Venosa". Catholic-Hierarchy.org. (for Chronology of Bishops) ^{[self-published]}
- Chow, Gabriel. "Diocese of Venosa". GCatholic.org. (for Chronology of Bishops) ^{[self-published]}

Catholic Church titles
Preceded by Andrea Pierbenedetti	Bishop of Venosa; 1635–1636	Succeeded by Gaspare Conturla
