= Tommaso da San Cipriano =

Most Reverend Tommaso da San Cipriano
- Bishop of Venosa
- Church: Catholic Church
- Diocese: Diocese of Venosa
- In office: 1519–?
- Predecessor: Lamberto Arbaud
- Successor: Guido de' Medici

Tommaso da San Cipriano was a Roman Catholic prelate who served as Bishop of Venosa (1519–?).

== Biography ==
Tommaso da San Cipriano was ordained a priest in the Order of Preachers. In 1519, he was appointed during the papacy of Pope Leo X as Bishop of Venosa. It is uncertain how long he served as Bishop of Venosa; the next bishop of record was Guido de' Medici who was appointed in 1527.

== External links and additional sources ==
- Cheney, David M. "Diocese of Venosa". Catholic-Hierarchy.org. (for Chronology of Bishops) ^{[self-published]}
- Chow, Gabriel. "Diocese of Venosa". GCatholic.org. (for Chronology of Bishops) ^{[self-published]}

Catholic Church titles
Preceded by Lamberto Arbaud	Bishop of Venosa; 1519–?	Succeeded by Guido de' Medici
