= Francesco Maria Neri =

Italian Roman Catholic prelate

Most Reverend Francesco Maria Neri
- Bishop of Venosa
- Church: Catholic Church
- Diocese: Diocese of Venosa
- In office: 1678–1684
- Predecessor: Giovanni Battista Desio
- Successor: Giovanni Francesco de Lorenzi
- Previous post: Bishop of Massa Lubrense (1672–1678)

Orders
- Ordination: 31 December 1654
- Consecration: 22 May 1672 by Federico Borromeo

Personal details
- Born: 6 February 1628 Tivoli, Italy
- Died: December 1684 (age 56) Venosa, Italy

Francesco Maria Neri (6 February 1628 – December 1684) was a Roman Catholic prelate who served as Bishop of Venosa (1678–1684) and Bishop of Massa Lubrense (1672–1678).

== Biography ==
Francesco Maria Neri was born in Tivoli, Italy on 6 February 1628 and ordained a priest on 31 December 1654. He held the degree of Doctor in utroque iure, and was the fiscal advocate of the Holy Office (Inquisition) in the Kingdom of Naples (1667). He was a canon of the cathedral of Naples, and in 1668 became its penitentiary major.

On 16 May 1672, he was appointed Bishop of Massa Lubrense by Pope Clement X. On 22 May 1672, he was consecrated bishop by Federico Borromeo (iuniore), Cardinal-Priest of Sant'Agostino, with Bernardino Rocci, Titular Archbishop of Damascus, and Domenico Gianuzzi, Titular Bishop of Dioclea in Phrygia, serving as co-consecrators.

On 10 January 1678, he was appointed by Pope Innocent XI as Bishop of Venosa. He served as Bishop of Venosa until his death in December 1684.

== External links and additional sources ==
- Giordani, D. V. (1862), "Venosa," (in Italian), in: Pietro Pianton (ed.), Enciclopedia ecclesiastica Vol. VII (Venezia: Girolamo Tasso, 1862) p. 953.
- Ughelli, Ferdinando; Coleti, NIccolo (1721). Italia sacra sive De episcopis Italiæ, et insularum adjacentium (in Latin). Vol. Tomus septimus (7). Venice: apud Sebastianum Coleti. p. 182.

Catholic Church titles
Preceded by Gian Vincenzo de' Giuli	Bishop of Massa Lubrense; 1672–1678	Succeeded by Andrea Massarenghi
Preceded by Giovanni Battista Desio	Bishop of Venosa; 1678–1684	Succeeded by Giovanni Francesco de Lorenzi
