= Lieuvin =

Plateau region in Normandy, France

Coordinates: 49.27°N 0.48°E

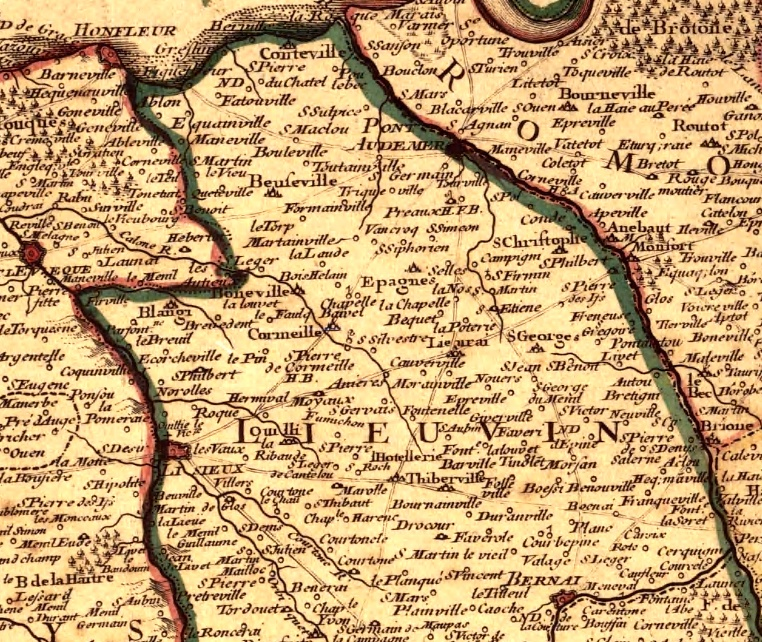
Map of Lieuvin, 1716

The Lieuvin (French pronunciation: [ljøvɛ̃]) is a plateau region in the western part of the Eure département in Normandy, France.

The plateau consists of typical Norman bocage and is bounded by the Seine estuary to the north, the Risle valley to the east, the Charentonne valley to the south and, in the west, the Pays d'Auge which corresponds to the Touques basin.

The economy is primarily agricultural, with a common crop being cereal. The largest towns are Beuzeville, Épaignes, Lieurey and Thiberville.
