= Risle =

River in France

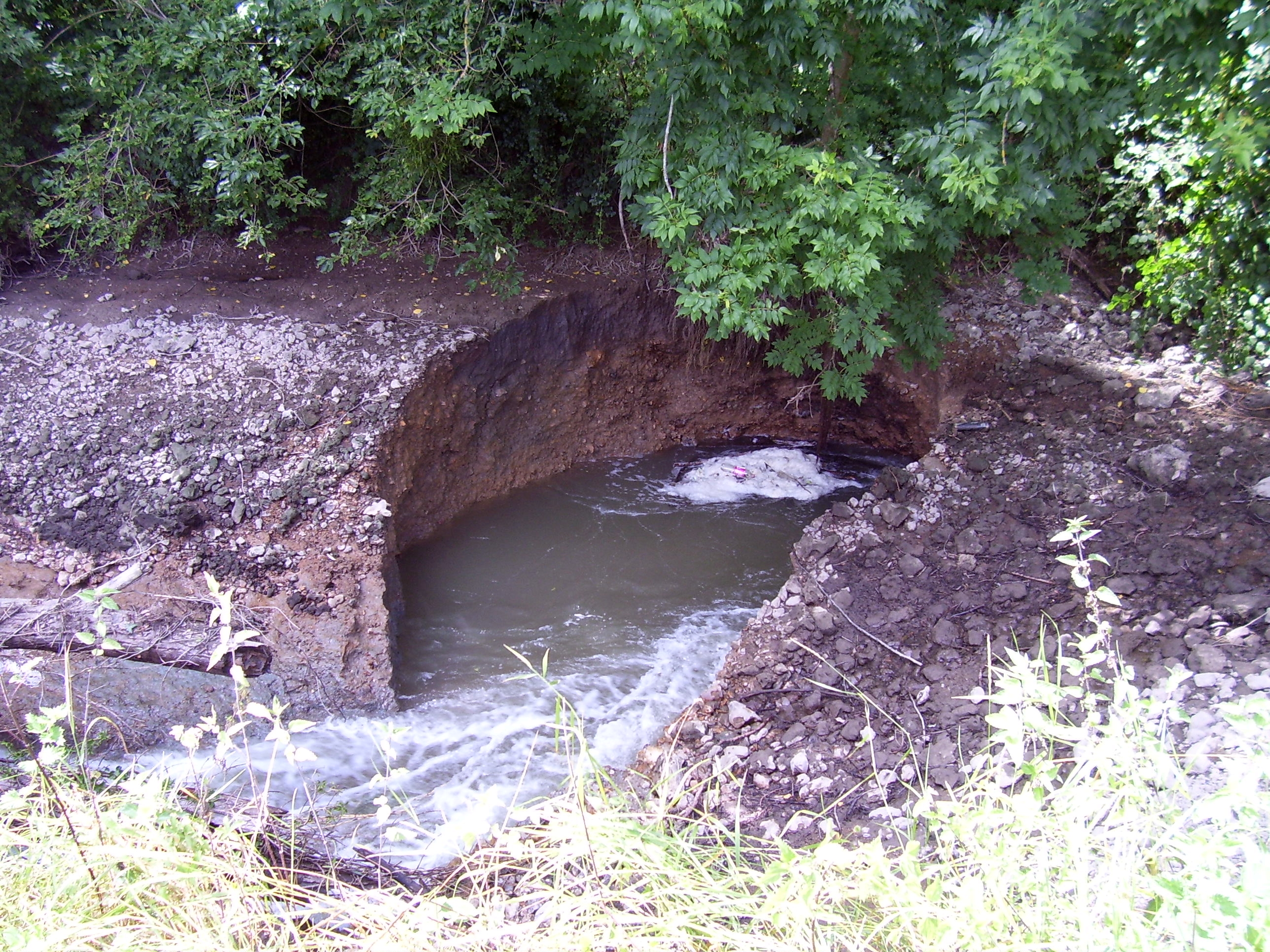
- Ponor of the Risle near La Ferrière-sur-Risle

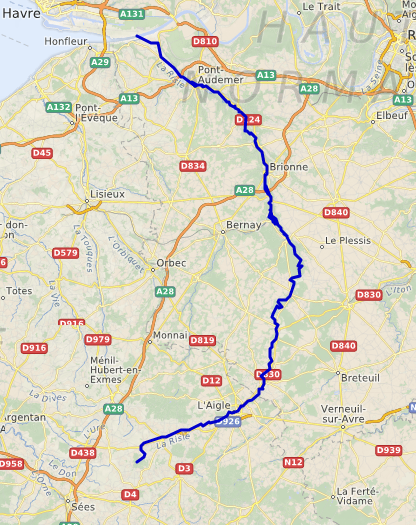

Location
- Country: France

Physical characteristics
- Source
  - location: Normandy
- Mouth
  - location: Seine
  - coordinates: 49°26′19″N 0°22′21″E
- Length: 145 km (90 mi)
- Basin size: 2,310 km^{2} (890 sq mi)
- Discharge
  - average: 14 m^{3}/s (490 cu ft/s)

Basin features
- Progression: Seine→ English Channel

The Risle (French pronunciation: [ʁil]; less common: Rille) is a 145 km (90 mi) long river in Normandy, left tributary of the Seine.

The river begins in the Orne department west of L'Aigle, crosses the western part of the department of Eure flowing from south to north and out into the estuary of the Seine on the left bank near Berville-sur-Mer. Its upper valley is part of the Pays d'Ouche, its lower valley separates the regions of the Lieuvin and Roumois.

The Risle is regarded as a coastal river. Fishing is common downstream at Pont-Audemer.

The river and surrounding areas are parts of a protected Natura 2000 site called Risle, Guiel, Charentonne.

On July 30, 2012, the Risle vanished in a ponor between La Ferrière-sur-Risle and La Houssaye. It runs underground for 8 km (5 mi).

Its only major tributary is the Charentonne. The Risle flows through the following departments and communes:

- Orne: Sainte-Gauburge-Sainte-Colombe, L'Aigle
- Eure: Rugles, Beaumont-le-Roger, Brionne, Montfort-sur-Risle, Pont-Audemer
