= Rugles =

- Commune
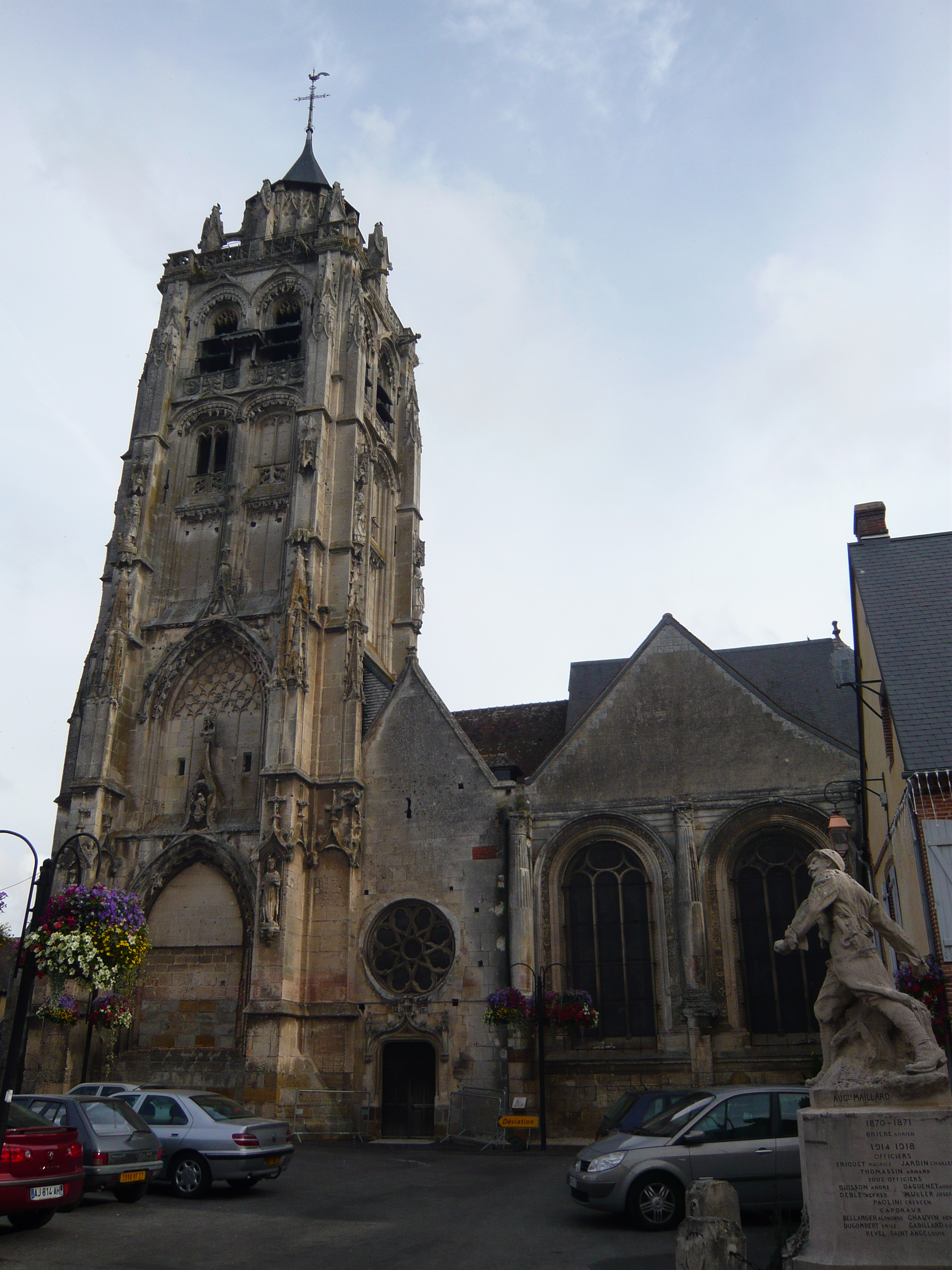
- The church in Rugles

- Coat of arms
- Location of Rugles
- Location within France Location within Normandy
- Coordinates: 48°49′23″N 0°42′39″E
- Country: France
- Region: Normandy
- Department: Eure
- Arrondissement: Bernay
- Canton: Breteuil

Government
  - Mayor (2020–2026): Denis Guitton
- Area^{1}: 14.1 km^{2} (5.4 sq mi)
- Elevation: 120 m (390 ft)
- Highest elevation: 236 m (774 ft)
- Lowest elevation: 171 m (561 ft)
- Population (2023): 2,199
  - Density: 156/km^{2} (404/sq mi)
- Time zone: UTC+01:00 (CET)
  - Summer (DST): UTC+02:00 (CEST)
- INSEE/Postal code: 27502 /27250
- ^{1} French Land Register data, which excludes lakes, ponds, glaciers > 1 km^{2} (0.386 sq mi or 247 acres) and river estuaries.

Rugles (French pronunciation: [ʁyɡl]) is a commune in the Eure department in Normandy in northern France.

== Geography ==
The commune along with another 69 communes shares part of a 4,747 hectare, Natura 2000 conservation area, called Risle, Guiel, Charentonne.

== Population ==
Historical population
Year	Pop.	±% p.a.
1968	2,688	—
1975	2,644	−0.24%
1982	2,539	−0.58%
1990	2,416	−0.62%
1999	2,549	+0.60%
2007	2,410	−0.70%
2012	2,350	−0.50%
2017	2,246	−0.90%
2023	2,199	−0.35%
Source: INSEE

== See also ==
- Communes of the Eure department
