= Pays d'Ouche =

Coordinates: 48.84°N 0.83°E

- Historical region of France
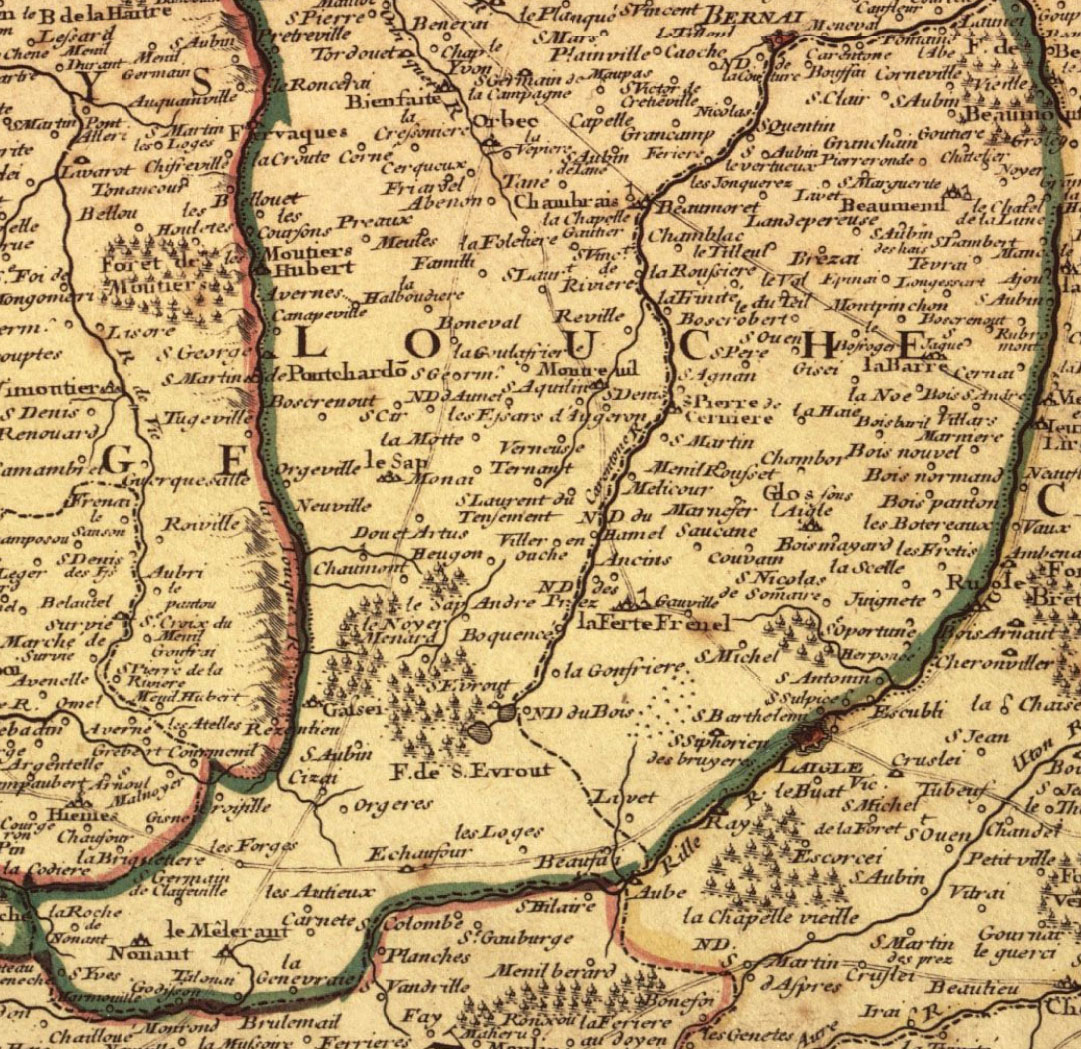
- Country: France
- Time zone: UTC+1 (CET)
  - Summer (DST): UTC+2 (CEST)

The Pays d'Ouche (French pronunciation: [pei duʃ], literally Land of Ouche) is an historical and geographical region in Normandy. It extends from the southwest of Évreux up to Bernay and Beaumont-le-Roger as a northern limit, and down to L'Aigle and to Gacé in the south. Additional cities are Breteuil-sur-Iton, Conches and Rugles. Neighboring regions are the Pays d'Auge and to the south is Perche (Perche (fr)).

Since the French revolution, the main part is located in the department of Eure, and the lesser portion in the neighboring Orne department (both Normandy region), where its capital town L'Aigle is situated.

The Risle River and other tributaries of the Seine flow through this area. Its chalky soil is not agriculturally productive. The principal towns of the area are L'Aigle, population 8,090 (2017), on the river Risle and Conches-en-Ouche, population 5,030 (2017), on the river Rouloir.
