= Orderic Vitalis =

English monk and historian (1075 – c. 1142)

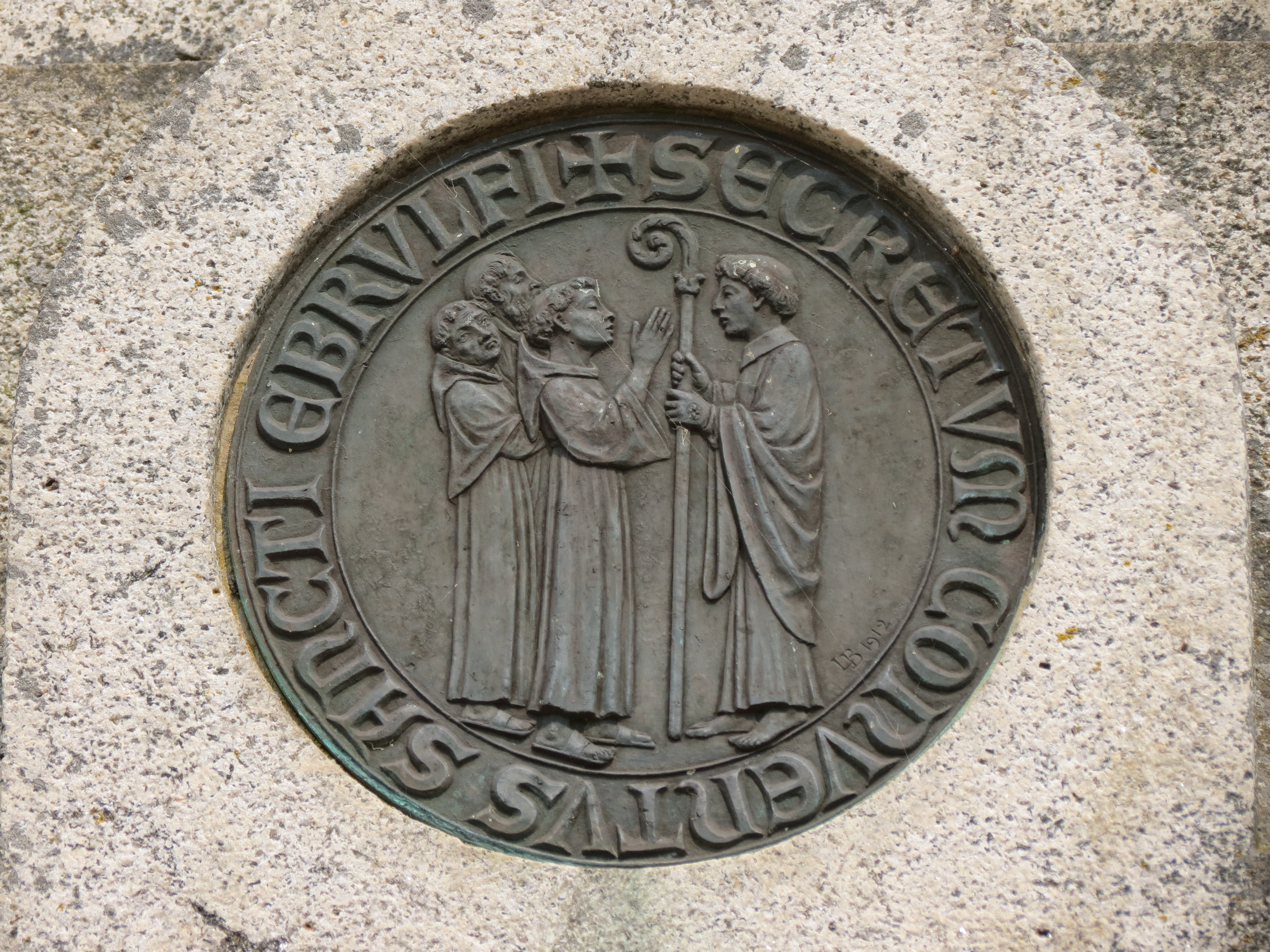
- Modern plaque commemorating Orderic Vitalis at the Abbey of Saint-Evroul, Normandy
- Born: Orderic; 16 February 1075; Atcham, Shropshire, England
- Died: c. 1142 (aged c. 67); Ouche Abbey, Duchy of Normandy
- Other name: Ordericus Vitalis
- Occupations: Oblate (1085–1090); Monk (beginning 1090); Subdeacon (1091–1093); Deacon (1093–1107); Priest (beginning 1107); Chronicler
- Notable work: Historia ecclesiastica (Orderic Vitalis)
- Father: Odelerius of Orléans

Religious life
- Religion: Catholic
- Order: Benedictine
- Monastic name: Vitalis

Senior posting
- Teacher: Siward; Jean of Reims

Orderic Vitalis (Latin: Ordericus Vitalis; 16 February 1075 – c. 1142) was an English chronicler and Benedictine monk who wrote one of the great contemporary chronicles of 11th- and 12th-century Normandy and Anglo-Norman England. Working out of the Abbey of Saint-Evroul, he is credited with writing the Historia Ecclesiastica, a work detailing the history of Europe and the Mediterranean from the birth of Jesus Christ into his own age. The son of a cleric, he was born into a noble family, claiming both English and Norman heritage. While he is known primarily for the Historia Ecclesiastica, he held various positions within the abbey including script master, librarian, and cantor. A prolific writer, he addressed various topics in his writings, both religious and secular. Modern historians view him as a reliable source.

== Early life ==
Orderic was born on 16 February 1075 in Atcham, Shropshire, England, the eldest son of a French priest, Odelerius of Orléans. He was followed by his two younger brothers Benedict and Everard. Odelerius had entered the service of Roger de Montgomery, 1st Earl of Shrewsbury, and had received from his patron a chapel there in 1082.

Clerical marriage during the 11th century was slowly being restricted throughout Europe and resistance that officials in Rouen faced from the clerical community in 1072 caused the Archbishop of Canterbury to take a more cautious approach. This led to a policy announced in 1076 by the Council of Winchester whereby clerics who were already married were allowed to keep their wives, while marriage was henceforth forbidden for unmarried clerics. As a result, Odelerius was able to retain his family. Orderic was one of the few monks who were of mixed parentage as his mother was of English heritage. Although the identity of his mother is unknown, it is known that she was English and Orderic identified with this heritage. Despite this, historians such as Marjorie Chibnall have inferred an animosity toward his mother from the omission of mention of her in his writings, whereas he expressed admiration for his father in his writings.

When Orderic was five, his parents sent him to an English monk, Siward by name, who kept a school in the Abbey of SS Peter and Paul at Shrewsbury. Orderic received from Siward a basic education in reading and writing as well as the history of the English people. At the age of ten, Orderic was entrusted as an oblate to the Abbey of Saint-Evroul in the Duchy of Normandy, which Montgomery had formerly despoiled but, in his later years, was loading with gifts. The parents paid thirty marks for their son's admission; he expresses the conviction that they imposed this exile upon him from an earnest desire for his welfare. Odelerius's respect for the monastic life is attested to by his own entry, a few years later, into a monastery which the earl had founded at his persuasion. Orderic, however, for a long time likened himself to "Joseph in a strange land". He did not know a word of French when he reached Normandy. His book, though written many years later, shows that he never lost his English cast of mind or his attachment to the country of his birth.

== Monastic life ==
When Orderic reached the legal age for profession as a monk, his monastic superiors gave him the religious name of "Vitalis" (after a member of the legendary Theban Legion of Christian martyrs) because they found it difficult to pronounce his English baptismal name of Orderic, a name he says was the same as the priest who baptised him. In the title of his great chronicle, he prefixes the old to the new name and proudly adds the epithet Angligena ("English-born").

Orderic became a deacon in 1093, and a priest in 1107. He left his cloister on several occasions, speaking of having visited Croyland, Worcester, Cambrai (1105) and Cluny Abbey (1132). He turned his attention at an early date to literature, and for many years appears to have spent his summers in the scriptorium. Eventually Orderic earned the position of master scribe, copying numerous works as well as overseeing and working with other scribes at the monastery. According to Charles Rozier, Orderic also served as librarian and cantor for the abbey. As librarian he catalogued the large collection of works at Saint-Evroul's library and provided edits to some of the works himself. His role as cantor included overseeing daily liturgy and duties of officials during mass at the abbey.

Orderic's first literary efforts were a continuation and revision of William of Jumièges' Gesta normannorum ducum, a broad history of the Normans and their dukes from the founding of Normandy, which Orderic carried forward into the early twelfth century. He also added information about earlier periods from other sources, for example William of Poitiers' Gesta Guillelmi, and included information not found elsewhere. As Orderic used Norman sources but wrote from an English perspective, his account of the Norman Conquest is balanced, he is sympathetic to both sides. This attitude persists in his Historia Ecclesiastica.

At some time between 1110 and 1115, Orderic's superiors ordered him to write the history of Saint-Evroul. The work, the Historia Ecclesiastica (Ecclesiastical History), grew under his hands until it became a general history of his own age. Saint-Evroul was a house of wealth and distinction. War-worn knights chose it as a resting place for their last years. It routinely entertained visitors from southern Italy, where it had established new foundations, and from England, where it had extensive possessions. Thus Orderic, though he witnessed no great events, could be well informed about them. Orderic is a vivid narrator; his character sketches are admirable as summaries of current estimates. His narrative is full of digressions that surprise readers who expect a strictly chronological ordering of events, but it has been argued that the digressions reflect Orderic's sense of the connections between events (between the foundation of Saint-Evroul and the Norman Conquest of Southern Italy, for example) and his desire to include as much of his monastic colleagues' memories in his History as possible. It would thus be a truly collective work. Orderic relays much invaluable information not provided by more methodical chroniclers. He throws a flood of light upon the manners and ideas of his own age, and he sometimes comments with shrewdness upon the broader aspects and tendencies of history. His narrative breaks off in the middle of 1141, though he added some finishing touches in 1142. He reports that he was then old and infirm (that year he would have reached the age of 67 years); he probably did not long survive the completion of his great work.

== The Historia Ecclesiastica ==
The Historia Ecclesiastica, described as the greatest English social history of the Middle Ages, falls into three sections:

1. Books i and ii give the history of Christianity from the birth of Christ. After 855 this becomes a bare catalogue of popes, ending with the name of Innocent I. These books Orderic added in 1136–1141 as an afterthought to the original scheme.
2. Books iii to vi form a history of Saint-Evroul, the original nucleus of the work. Planned before 1122, they were mainly composed in the years 1123–1131. The fourth and fifth books contain long digressions on the deeds of William the Conqueror in Normandy and England. Before 1067 these are chiefly derived from two extant sources: William of Jumieges' Gesta Normannorum Ducum and William of Poitiers' Gesta Guillelmi. For the years 1067–1071 Orderic follows the lost portion of the Gesta Guillelmi, and is therefore of the first importance. From 1071, he begins to be an independent authority. Notices of political events in this part of his work are far less copious than in the later books.
3. Books vii to xiii relegate ecclesiastical affairs to the background. In this section, after sketching the history of France under the Carolingian and early Capet dynasties, Orderic takes up the events of his own times, starting from about 1082. He has much to say concerning the Empire, the papacy, the Normans in Sicily and Apulia, the First Crusade (for which he follows Fulcher of Chartres and Baudri of Bourgueil, but with notable alterations) and contemporary fashion such as long pointed shoes. But his chief interest is in the histories of the three brothers: Robert Curthose, Duke of Normandy, William Rufus and Henry I of England. He continues his work, in the form of annals, up to the defeat and capture of Stephen of England at Lincoln in 1141.

The historian Marjorie Chibnall states that Orderic used now-lost pancartes (cartularies or collections of charters) of various Norman monastic houses as sources for his historical writings.

Orderic addressed both contemporaries and future generations, intending for his work to be studied by monks and novices learning about the history of the monastery and its benefactors. The work as a whole was not widely read in the Middle Ages, though individual parts of it were popular and circulated.

The Historia Ecclesiastica is usually cited by abbreviation of the author's name rather than the title; that is, either as Ord. Vitalis or Ord. Vit. followed by volume and page numbers.

== Secular commentary ==
Throughout his writings, Orderic spoke on a great deal of secular topics ranging from the violence of Norman conquest, the right to rule and inheritance, the strength of government, the make up of various courts and their military structure. Most of these writings were produced during the reign of King Henry I. Much of Orderic's intended audience included knights and nobility who would have had a vested interest in these topics. Knights that frequented the Abbey of Saint-Evroul often were waiting for their inheritance to come about or others who hoped to increase their standing through their service to a household. This would explain why we see the subject of inheritance and right to rule in his works. Orderic echoed the reasoning of William's conquest while still taking issue with several aspects of the conquest. Specifically, he spoke on the acquisitions of English lands by Norman lords, describing the acquisitions as plunder. On the subject of plunder, Orderic stands out amongst his peers for his critique of Bohemond I of Antioch whom he believed to have used the mission of the crusades as an excuse to gain power for himself. He also spoke on the role of clerics in the battlefield. He emphasized his reasoning for only contributing to violence on behalf of the king, laymen, or other clerics.

Orderic's thoughts on marriage permeated into his writing, probably from the experience he had with his father's clerical marriage and the absence of his mother. One example of his marriage views come from the arrangement of Bertrade of Montfort. When her uncle, William, Count of Éverux, arranged for Bertrade to marry Fulk of Anjou, Orderic wrote disparagingly of Fulk's character in recognition of how she was being used for the sake of power. When Bertrade eloped with the already married King Philip I of France, he changed his tone and admonished them all, describing Bertrade as a concubine and Fulk and Philip I both as adulterers.

== Sources ==
- Chibnall, Marjorie (1976). "Charter and Chronicle: The Use of Archive Sources by Norman Historians". Church and Government in the Middle Ages: Essays Presented to C. R. Cheney on his 70th Birthday. Brooke, C. N. L., Luscombe, D. E., Martin, G. H., Owen, Dorothy (editors). Cambridge, UK: Cambridge University Press. pp. 1–18. ISBN 0-521-21172-7.
- Chibnall, Marjorie, The World of Orderic Vitalis (Oxford, 1987).
- Hollister, C. Warren (2001). Henry I. Frost, Amanda Clark (editor). New Haven, Connecticut: Yale University Press. ISBN 0-300-08858-2.
- Nakashian, Craig M. “Orderic Vitalis and Henry of Huntingdon: Views of Clerical Warfare from Inside and Outside the Cloister.” In Between Sword and Prayer: Warfare and Medieval Clergy in Cultural Perspective, edited by Radoslaw Kotecki, Jacek Maciejewski, and John S. Ott. Leiden, NL: Brill, 2018.
- O'Donnell, Thomas (2016). "Meanders, Loops, and Dead Ends: Literary Form and the Common Life in Orderic's Historia ecclesiastica". In Rozier, Charles C.; Roach, Daniel; Gasper, Giles E. M.; van Houts, Elisabeth (eds.). Orderic Vitalis: Life, Work, and Interpretations. Woodbridge: Boydell Press. pp. 298–323.
- Rozier, Charles C., Daniel Roach, Giles E.M. Gasper and Elisabeth van Houts (eds) Orderic Vitalis: Life, Works and Interpretations (Woodbridge, Boydell Press, 2016).
