= Roman Catholic Diocese of Venosa =

The Italian Catholic diocese of Venosa, in southern Italy, existed until 1986. In that year it was united into the Diocese of Melfi-Rapolla-Venosa. From 1976 to 1986, Venosa had been a suffragan of the archdiocese of Potenza e Marsico Nuovo.

== History ==
The earliest events of the Christian history of Venosa are contained in the mythological martyrdoms of the Twelve Brothers (286) and, in 303, of Felix, bishop of Thibiuca in Africa proconsularis, near Carthage. Francesco Lanzoni has shown that there are five different versions of the martyrology, sometimes with different companions, and different destinations to the place of execution. The first recension is assigned to the sixth century. The second recension of the martyrology mentions Venosa, but to do so two emendations of two different nonsensical place names are required. The third recension has the bishop executed at Nola, though his body ends up in Milan, or Nola (through an emendation of the text). Lanzoni agrees with most scholars in placing Bishop Felix's death in Africa near Carthage, under the proconsul Annulinus.

Stephanus (498) is the first Bishop of Venosa whose date is known accurately.

The names of other bishops up to the Norman conquest in the 11th century have not been preserved.

The Benedictine abbey of Santissima Trinità di Venosa was founded in 1043, under the patronage of the Norman Duke Drogo. The abbey became the mausoleum of the family of Duke Robert Guiscard.

It is alleged that a bishop of Venosa in the first half of the 13th century was assassinated by a cleric. Bishop Bono (1223) is usually named as the victim. The only source for the incident is the Holy Roman Emperor, Frederick II, whose remark is preserved in a document in which he responds to a number of questions put to him by four bishops, sent as nuncios by Pope Gregory IX. The bishops complained that clerics were being thrown into imperial prisons and executed. Frederick, in a reproach to the laxity of church authorities, replied: "[The Emperor] is also aware of killings, because the Church of Venosa weeps over the death of their bishop, killed by a monk, because of the lack of punishment of clerics and monks.

A diocesan synod was held in Venosa by Bishop Giovanni Gerolamo Maneri (1585–1591) on 17 September 1589. Andrea Pierbenedetti (1611-1634) held a diocesan synod in Venosa on 2 April 1614. Bishop Pietro Antonio Corsignano held a diocesan synod in Venosa on 4–6 April 1728.

Bishop Lamberto Arbaud (1509) embellished the cathedral, which was demolished a little later to permit the erection of fortifications.

=== The Napoleonic disruption and restoration ===
From 1801 to 1818 the see of Venosa remained vacant. From 1806–1808, Naples was occupied by the French, and Joseph Bonaparte was made king, after Napoleon had deposed King Ferdinand IV. Joseph Bonaparte was succeeded by Joachim Murat from 1808 until the fall of Napoleon in 1815. Pope Pius VII was a prisoner of Napoleon in France from 1809 to 1815, and was both unable and unwilling to make new episcopal appointments. The French expelled all monks, nuns, and Jesuits from the kingdom, and closed the monasteries and convents; colleges of canons were also closed.

Following the extinction of the Napoleonic Kingdom of Italy, the Congress of Vienna authorized the restoration of the Papal States and the Kingdom of Naples. Since the French occupation had seen the abolition of many Church institutions in the Kingdom, as well as the confiscation of most Church property and resources, it was imperative that Pope Pius VII and King Ferdinand IV reach agreement on restoration and restitution. Ferdinand, however, was not prepared to accept the pre-Napoleonic situation, in which Naples was a feudal subject of the papacy. Neither was he prepared to accept the large number of small dioceses in his kingdom; following French intentions, he demanded the suppression of fifty dioceses. Lengthy, detailed, and acrimonious negotiations ensued. On 17 July 1816, King Ferdinand issued a decree, in which he forbade the reception of any papal document, including papal bulls, without prior reception of the royal exequatur. This meant that prelates could not receive bulls of appointment, consecration, or installation without the king's permission.

A concordat was finally signed on 16 February 1818, and ratified by Pius VII on 25 February 1818. Ferdinand issued the concordat as a law on 21 March 1818. The re-erection of the dioceses of the kingdom and the ecclesiastical provinces took more than three years. The right of the king to nominate the candidate for a vacant bishopric was recognized, as in the Concordat of 1741, subject to papal confirmation (preconisation). On 27 June 1818, Pius VII issued the bull De Ulteriore, in which the metropolitanate of Acerenza was restored, with Anglona e Tursi, Potenza, Tricarico, and Venosa as suffragans; the diocese of Lavello was permanently suppressed and united to the Church of Venosa.

In 1818, the diocese of Lavello, suffragan to the archdiocese of Bari, was suppressed and its territory united to the diocese of Venosa. The city of Lavello was founded in 1042, when the Norman count Arniclino fixed his seat at Lavello.

=== Modern Developments ===
Following the Second Vatican Council, and in accordance with the norms laid out in the council's decree, Christus Dominus chapter 40, Pope Paul VI ordered a reorganization of the ecclesiastical provinces in southern Italy. The decree "Eo quod spirituales" of 12 September 1976 created a new episcopal conference in the region called "Basilicata", to which were assigned all of the dioceses that belonged to the ecclesiastical province of Potenza; they had formerly belonged to the episcopal conference of "Apulia".

On 30 September 1986, Pope John Paul II ordered the unification of the dioceses of Melfi, Rapolla, and Venosa, into a single bishopric, to be named "Dioecesis Melphiensis-Rapollensis-Venusina", with its headquarters in Melfi. The cathedral of Melfi was designated the diocesan cathedral, and the cathedral of Venosa became a co-cathedral, and its Chapter became the Chapter of a co-cathedral. The diocese of Venosa was suppressed, and its territory united to the territory of Melfi-Rapolla-Venosa. The diocese of Rapolla had been suppressed in 1528, and its territory united to the diocese of Melphi.

The diocese of Melfi is a suffragan of the Archdiocese of Potenza-Muro Lucano-Marsico Nuovo.

== Statistics ==
Year	Catholics	Total Population	Percent Catholic	Diocesan Priests	Religious Priests	Total Priests	Catholics Per Priest	Permanent Deacons	Male Religious	Female Religious	Parishes
1886		36,000	.0%			89	0				8
1950	50,050	50,100	99.9%	29	11	40	1,251		15	26	10
1970	40,267	40,567	99.3%	17	12	29	1,388		12	70	13
1980	33,350	33,619	99.2%	18	2	20	1,667		3	54	13

== Bishops of Venosa ==
=== to 1200 ===
...
[Philippus] (238)
[Joannes] (443)
[Asterus] (493)

- Stephanus (attested c. 492/493–502)

...
[Petrus (1014)]
...
[Andreas (1045)]
[Iaquintus (1053)]

- Morandus (attested 1059)
- Rogerius (attested 1069)
- Constantinus (attested 1071–1074)

...

- Berengarius (1093– ? )

...
[Robertus (1105)]

- Fulco (attested 1113)

...

- Petrus (attested 1177–1183)

...

=== 1200 to 1500 ===
...

- Bonus (attested 1223)

...

- Jacobus (attested 1256)

...

- Philippus de Pistorio, O.P. (1271–1281/1282)

...

- Guido (attested 1299–1302)

...

- Petrus (1331–1334)

...

- Raimundus Agonti de Clareto, O.Carm. (1334–1360?)
- Petrus (1360–1363?)
- Goffredus (1363)
- Thomasius (1363– ? )
- Stephanus ( ? ) Avignon Obedience
- Salvator Gerardi de Altomonte (1387) Avignon Obedience
- Nicholas Franciscus Grassi (1387– )
- Laurentius de Aegidio (attested 1383)
- Franciscus de Veneraneriis (1386-1395) Roman Obedience
- Jannotus (Joannes) (1395–1400) Roman Obedience
- Andreas Fusco (1400–1419) Roman Obedience
- Dominicus de Monte Leone, O.P. (1419–1431)
- Robertus Procopii (1431–1459)
- Nicolas Solimele (17 Oct 1459–1492)
- Sigismundus Pappacoda (1492–1499)
- Antonio de Fabris (Fabrigas) (1499-1501)

=== 1500 to 1600 ===
- Berardo Bongiovanni (Bernardo, Bernardino) (1501–1509)
- Lamberto Arbaud (1510 - ? )
- Tommaso da San Cipriano, O.P. (1519 - )
- Guido de' Medici (1527-1528)
- Fernando Seroni da Gerona, O.S.A. (23 Mar 1528 - 1542 Resigned)
- Alvaro della Quadra (12 May 1542 - 1551 Resigned)
- Simone Gattola (13 Mar 1552 - Apr 1566 Died)
- Francesco Rusticucci (21 Aug 1566 - 31 Jan 1567 Appointed, Bishop of Fano)
- Paolo Oberti, O.P. (17 Feb 1567 - 13 Sep 1567 Died)
- Giovanni Antonio Locatelli (12 Dec 1567 - 7 Sep 1571 Died)
- Baldassarre Giustiniani (6 Feb 1572 - 1584)
- Giovanni Tommaso Sanfelice (1584 - 6 Mar 1585 Died)
- Giovanni Gerolamo Mareri (1585–1587)
- Pietro Ridolfi da Tosssignano, O.Min.Conv. (4 May 1587 -1591)
- Vincenzo Calcio, O.P. (18 Feb 1591 - 3 May 1598 Died)

=== 1600 to 1800 ===
- Sigismondo Donati (17 Aug 1598 -1605
- Mario Moro (3 Aug 1605 - 1610)
- Andrea Pierbenedetti (14 Mar 1611 - 1634)
- Bartolomeo Frigerio (1635-1636)

Sede vacante (1635–1638)

- Gaspare Conturla (15 Jan 1638 - Apr 1640)
- Sallustio Pecolo (Pecoli) (3 Dec 1640 - 13 Mar 1648 Resigned)
- Antonio Pavonelli, O.F.M. Conv. (1648-1653)
- Giacinto Tarugi, O.P. (1654-1674)
- Giovanni Battista Desio (7 May 1674 - Aug 1677)
- Francesco Maria Neri (1678-1684)
- Giovanni Francesco de Lorenzi (14 May 1685 - Oct 1698)
- Placido Scoppa, C.R. (1699 - Dec 1710)

Sede vacante (1710–1718)

- Giovanni Michele Teroni, B. (1718-1726)
- Felipe Itúrbide (Yturibe), O. Carm. (31 Jul 1726 - 13 Mar 1727 Resigned)
- Pietro Antonio Corsignani (17 Mar 1727 -1738)
- Francesco Antonio Salomone (Salamone) (1738-1743)
- Giuseppe Giusti (20 May 1743 - 1764 Died)
- Gaspare Barletta (17 Dec 1764 - 1778 Died)
- Pietro Silvio di Gennaro (12 Jul 1779 - 1786 Died)
- Salvatore Gonnelli (18 Jun 1792 Confirmed - 23 Sep 1801 Died)

=== since 1800 ===
Sede vacante (1801–1818)

- Nicola Caldora (1818-1825 Resigned)
- Luigi Maria Parisio (Canisio) (9 Apr 1827 Confirmed - 1827)
- Federico Guarini, O.S.B. (23 Jun 1828 Confirmed - Sep 1837)
- Michele de Gattis (2 Oct 1837 Confirmed - 23 Apr 1847)
- Antonio Michele Vaglio (22 Dec 1848 Confirmed - 28 Jul 1865)

Sede vacante (1865–1871)

- Nicola de Martino (1871–1878 Resigned)
- Girolamo Volpe (15 Jul 1878 Succeeded - 1880)
- Francesco Maria Imparati, O.F.M. (27 Feb 1880 - 23 Jun 1890 Appointed, Archbishop of Acerenza e Matera)
- Lorenzo Antonelli (1891-1905)
- Felice del Sordo (12 Aug 1907 -1911)
- Giovanni Battista Niola (Oct 1912 - Nov 1912 Resigned)
- Angelo Petrelli (20 May 1913 - 11 Sep 1923 Died)
- Alberto Costa (30 Apr 1924 - 7 Dec 1928 Appointed, Bishop of Lecce)
- Luigi dell'Aversana (Orabona) (14 Jan 1931 - 6 Nov 1934 Died)
- Domenico Petroni (1935–1966 Retired)
- Giuseppe Vairo (5 Mar 1973 - 25 Oct 1976 Appointed, Bishop of Tricarico)
- Armando Franco (25 Oct 1976 - 12 Sep 1981 Appointed, Bishop of Oria)

30 September 1986: Diocese of Venosa suppressed, and its territory united with the Diocese of Melfi e Rapolla to form the Diocese of Melfi-Rapolla-Venosa

== See also ==
Vescovi di Venosa (in Italian)

== Books ==
- Eubel, Conradus, ed. (1913). Hierarchia catholica (in Latin). Vol. Tomus 1 (second ed.). Münster: Libreria Regensbergiana.
- Eubel, Conradus, ed. (1914). Hierarchia catholica (in Latin). Vol. Tomus 2 (second ed.). Münster: Libreria Regensbergiana.
- Eubel, Conradus; Gulik, Guilelmus (1923). Hierarchia catholica (in Latin). Vol. Tomus 3 (second ed.). Münster: Libreria Regensbergiana.
- Gams, Pius Bonifatius (1873). Series episcoporum Ecclesiae catholicae: quotquot innotuerunt a beato Petro apostolo (in Latin). Ratisbon: Typis et Sumptibus Georgii Josephi Manz.
- Gauchat, Patritius (Patrice) (1935). Hierarchia catholica (in Latin). Vol. IV (1592-1667). Münster: Libraria Regensbergiana.
- Ritzler, Remigius; Sefrin, Pirminus (1952). Hierarchia catholica medii et recentis aevi (in Latin). Vol. V (1667-1730). Patavii: Messagero di S. Antonio.
- Ritzler, Remigius; Sefrin, Pirminus (1958). Hierarchia catholica medii et recentis aevi (in Latin). Vol. VI (1730-1799). Patavii: Messagero di S. Antonio.
- Ritzler, Remigius; Sefrin, Pirminus (1968). Hierarchia Catholica medii et recentioris aevi sive summorum pontificum, S. R. E. cardinalium, ecclesiarum antistitum series... A pontificatu Pii PP. VII (1800) usque ad pontificatum Gregorii PP. XVI (1846) (in Latin). Vol. VII. Monasterii: Libr. Regensburgiana.
- Remigius Ritzler; Pirminus Sefrin (1978). Hierarchia catholica Medii et recentioris aevi... A Pontificatu PII PP. IX (1846) usque ad Pontificatum Leonis PP. XIII (1903) (in Latin). Vol. VIII. Il Messaggero di S. Antonio.
- Pięta, Zenon (2002). Hierarchia catholica medii et recentioris aevi... A pontificatu Pii PP. X (1903) usque ad pontificatum Benedictii PP. XV (1922) (in Latin). Vol. IX. Padua: Messagero di San Antonio. ISBN 978-88-250-1000-8.

=== Studies ===
- Cappelletti, Giuseppe (1870). Le chiese d'Italia: dalla loro origine sino ai nostri giorni (in Italian). Vol. vigesimo (20). Venezia: G. Antonelli.
- D'Avino, Vincenzio (1848). Cenni storici sulle chiese arcivescovili, vescovili, e prelatizie (nullius) del regno delle due Sicilie (in Italian). Naples: dalle stampe di Ranucci. pp. 745–746.
- Di Ciesco, T. (1894). Catalogo dei Vescovi della venosina diocesi con brevi notizie intorno a Venosa e le sue chiese (in Italian), Siena: Tip. Edit. S. Bernardino 1894.
- Kamp, Norbert (1975). Kirche und Monarchie im staufischen Königreich Sizilien. I. Prosopographische Grundlegung: 2. Apulien und Kalabrien. München: Wilhelm Fink Verlag. (in German)
- Kehr, Paul Fridolin (1962). Italia pontificia. Vol. IX: Samnium — Apulia — Lucania. Berlin: Weidmann. (in Latin)
- Lanzoni, Francesco (1927). Le diocesi d'Italia dalle origini al principio del secolo VII (an. 604). (in Italian) Faenza: F. Lega, pp. 285–288; 291-299.
- Torelli, Felice (1848). La chiave del Concordato dell'anno 1818 e degli atti emanati posteriormente al medesimo. (in Italian) Volume 1, second edition Naples: Stamperia del Fibreno, 1848.
- Ughelli, Ferdinando; Coleti, NIccolo (1721). Italia sacra sive De episcopis Italiæ, et insularum adjacentium (in Latin). Vol. Tomus septimus (7). Venice: apud Sebastianum Coleti. pp. 165–182.
