= Fabrizio Spada =

Italian cardinal

His Eminence Fabrizio Spada
- Cardinal-bishop of Palestrina
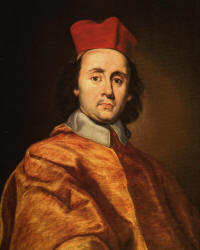
- Church: Catholic Church

Orders
- Consecration: 14 August 1672 by Gasparo Carpegna
- Created cardinal: 23 March 1676
- Rank: Cardinal Bishop

Personal details
- Born: 17 March 1643 Rome, Italy
- Died: 15 June 1717 (age 74) Rome, Italy

Fabrizio Spada (Rome, 17 March 1643 – Rome, 15 June 1717) was an Italian Cardinal of the Roman Catholic Church, and served as Secretary of State under Pope Innocent XII.

== Life ==
Born on 17 March 1643 in Rome, he was the son of Orazio Spada and Veralli Maria. He was also a great-nephew of Cardinal Bernardino Spada and a nephew of Cardinal Giambattista Spada on his father's side, and a nephew of Cardinal Fabrizio Verallo on his mother's side. His sister, Eugenia Spada (1639–1717) married Girolamo Mattei, Duca di Giove of the House of Mattei. Spada completed his studies as a doctor of law ("in utroque iure") at the University of Perugia in 1664; after which he took holy orders on 22 December 1669. He was subsequently appointed referendary to the Apostolic Signatura and Lay Abbot of the monastery of Santa Maria d' Attilia, in the diocese of San Severino.

In 1672, he became titular Latin Archbishop of Patras but had to obtain a dispensation because he was still below canonical age, and papal nuncio to the duchy of Savoy. On 14 August 1672 he was consecrated bishop by Gasparo Carpegna, Cardinal-Priest of Santa Pudenziana with Alessandro Crescenzi (cardinal), titular Latin patriarch of Alexandria, and Bernardino Rocci, titular archbishop of Damasco, serving as co-consecrators. Two years later, on 3 January 1674, he was appointed Apostolic Nuncio to France. Pope Clement X created him cardinal-priest in the consistory of 27 May 1675, and he was given the titulus of San Callisto. This was exchanged in 1689 for that of San Crisogono and in 1708 for that of Santa Prassede.

He was appointed legate to Urbino in 1686 and served as Camerlengo of the Sacred College of Cardinals from 1688 to 1689. Finally, he achieved his most senior appointment as Cardinal Secretary of State, serving from 1691 to 1700 under the papacy of Innocent XII. In 1710, he became cardinal-bishop of the Roman see of Palestrina. Other titles included Prefect for the Congregation of Good Government (now suppressed), archpriest of the Basilica of St. John Lateran, and Secretary for the Holy Office or Inquisition from 1716 until his death. As cardinal, he also participated in the papal conclaves of 1676, 1689, 1691 and 1700.

He died in the family palace in Rome, and his body was laid out for viewing in the church of Santa Maria in Vallicella before being interred within the Spada family chapel.

== Episcopal succession ==
Episcopal succession of Fabrizio Spada

While bishop, he was the principal consecrator of:

- Giovanni Carlo Antonelli, Bishop of Ferentino (1677);
- Alfonso de Aloysio, Bishop of Squillace (1688);
- Michelangelo Mattei, Titular Archbishop of Hadrianopolis in Haemimonto (1689);
- Marco de Rama, Bishop of Crotone (1690);
- Giorgio Parchich, Bishop of Nona (1690);
- Ferdinando Strozza, Titular Archbishop of Tarsus (1690);
- Francesco Picarelli, Bishop of Narni (1690);
- Lorenzo Maria Fieschi (de Flisco), Archbishop of Avignon (1690);
- Baldassare Cenci (seniore), Titular Archbishop of Larissa in Thessalia (1691);
- Giovanni Giacomo Cavallerini, Titular Archbishop of Nicaea (1692);
- Alessandro Lambert, Bishop of Aosta (1692);
- Gerolamo Ubertino Provana, Bishop of Alba (1692);
- Pierre Lambert Ledrou, Titular Bishop of Porphyreon (1692);
- Eligio Caracciolo, Archbishop of Cosenza (1694);
- Francesco Azzolini, Bishop of Ripatransone (1694);
- Luigi Capuani (Ludovico Capulani), Bishop of Ravello e Scala (1694);
- Muzio Gaeta, Archbishop of Bari (1698);
- Tommaso Ruffo, Titular Archbishop of Nicaea (1698);
- Giambattista Patrizi, Titular Archbishop of Seleucia in Isauria (1702); and
- Carlo Maria Mascardi, Bishop of Ventimiglia (1710).

Catholic Church titles
Preceded by Giacinto Solaro di Moretta	Titular Archbishop of Patrae; 1672 – 1676	Succeeded by Sinibaldo Doria
Preceded by Marcello Durazzo	Apostolic Nuncio to Savoy; 1672 – 1674	Succeeded by Pietro Alberini
Preceded by Francesco Nerli (iuniore)	Apostolic Nuncio to France; 1674 – 1675	Succeeded by Pompeo Varese
Preceded by Pietro Vidoni (seniore)	Cardinal-Priest of San Callisto; 1676 – 1689	Succeeded by Nicolò Acciaioli
Preceded by Giulio Spinola	Cardinal-Priest of San Crisogono; 1689 – 1708	Succeeded by Filippo Antonio Gualtieri
Preceded by Giambattista Rubini	Cardinal Secretary of State; 14 July 1691 – 27 September 1700	Succeeded by Fabrizio Paolucci
Preceded by Paluzzo Paluzzi Altieri degli Albertoni	Archpriest of the Basilica of St. John Lateran; 1698–1699	Succeeded by Benedetto Pamphili
Preceded by Galeazzo Marescotti	Camerlengo of the Sacred College of Cardinals; 17 May 1688 – 24 January 1689	Succeeded by Philip Thomas Howard of Norfolk
Preceded by Galeazzo Marescotti	Cardinal-Priest of Santa Prassede; 1708 – 1710	Succeeded by Bandino Panciatici
Preceded by Luis Manuel Fernández de Portocarrero	Cardinal-Bishop of Palestrina; 1710 – 1717	Succeeded by Francesco del Giudice
Preceded by Galeazzo Marescotti	Secretary for the Holy Office; 1716 – 15 June 1717	Succeeded by Nicolò Acciaioli
