= Muzio Gaeta =

Italian Roman Catholic prelate

Most Reverend Muzio Gaeta
- Patriarch of Jerusalem; Archbishop of Bari-Canosa
- Church: Catholic Church
- Diocese: Latin Patriarchate of Jerusalem
- In office: 1708–1728
- Predecessor: Francesco Martelli
- Successor: Vincenzo Ludovico Gotti
- Previous post: Archbishop of Bari-Canosa (1698–1728)

Orders
- Ordination: 22 May 1689
- Consecration: 13 April 1698 by Fabrizio Spada

Personal details
- Born: 1663 Naples, Italy
- Died: 7 March 1728 (age 65) Bari, Italy

Muzio Gaeta (1663–1728) was a Roman Catholic prelate who served as Archbishop of Bari-Canosa (1698–1728) and Titular Patriarch of Jerusalem (1708–1728).

== Biography ==
Muzio Gaeta was born in 1663 in Naples, Italy. On 19 May 1689, he was ordained as deacon and on 22 May 1689 he was ordained a priest. On 7 April 1698, he was appointed during the papacy of Pope Innocent XII as Archbishop of Bari-Canosa. On 13 April 1698, he was consecrated bishop by Fabrizio Spada, Cardinal-Priest of San Crisogono with Michelangelo dei Conti, Titular Archbishop of Tarsus, and Francesco Acquaviva d'Aragona, Titular Archbishop of Larissa in Thessalia, serving as co-consecrators. On 14 May 1708, he was appointed during the papacy of Pope Clement XI as Titular Patriarch of Jerusalem. He served as Archbishop of Bari-Canosa and Titular Patriarch of Jerusalem until his death on 7 March 1728.

While bishop, he was the principal co-consecrator of Simone Paolo Aleotti, Bishop of Civita Castellana e Orte (1698).

== External links and additional sources ==
- Cheney, David M. "Patriarchate of Jerusalem {Gerusalemme}". Catholic-Hierarchy.org. (for Chronology of Bishops) ^{[self-published]}
- Chow, Gabriel. "Patriarchal See of Jerusalem". GCatholic.org. (for Chronology of Bishops) ^{[self-published]}
- Cheney, David M. "Archdiocese of Bari-Bitonto". Catholic-Hierarchy.org. (for Chronology of Bishops) ^{[self-published]}
- Chow, Gabriel. "Metropolitan Archdiocese of Bari–Bitonto (Italy)". GCatholic.org. (for Chronology of Bishops) ^{[self-published]}

Catholic Church titles
Preceded by Carlo Loffredo	Archbishop of Bari-Canosa; 1698–1728	Succeeded by Mihály Karl von Althan
Preceded by Francesco Martelli	Titular Patriarch of Jerusalem; 1708–1728	Succeeded by Vincenzo Ludovico Gotti
