= Juan Pastor =

Roman Catholic Bishop

Most Reverend Juan Pastor
- Bishop of Crotone
- Church: Catholic Church
- Diocese: Diocese of Crotone-Santa Severina
- In office: 1638–1664
- Predecessor: Niceforo Melisseno Comneno
- Successor: Girolamo Carafa

Orders
- Consecration: 12 September 1638 by Francesco Maria Brancaccio

Personal details
- Died: 1664 Crotone, Italy

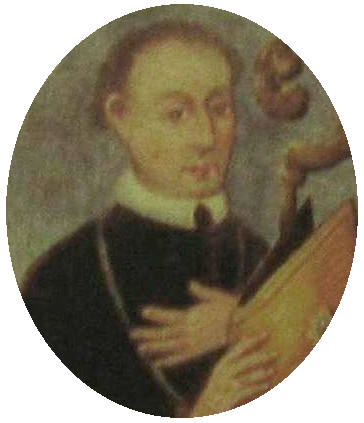
Juan Poster (image taken: unknown)

Juan Pastor, O.M. (died 1664) was a Roman Catholic prelate who served as Bishop of Crotone (1638–1664).

== Biography ==
Juan Pastor was ordained a priest in the Order of the Minims. On 30 August 1638, he was appointed during the papacy of Pope Urban VIII as Bishop of Crotone. On 12 September 1638, he was consecrated bishop by Francesco Maria Brancaccio, Cardinal-Priest of Santi XII Apostoli, with Tommaso Carafa, Bishop of Vulturara e Montecorvino, and Giovanni Battista Altieri, Bishop Emeritus of Camerino, serving as co-consecrators. He served as Bishop of Crotone until his death in 1664. While bishop, he was the principal co-consecrator of Alfonso de la Cueva-Benavides y Mendoza-Carrillo, Cardinal-Bishop of Palestrina (1644).

== External links and additional sources ==
- Cheney, David M. "Archdiocese of Crotone-Santa Severina". Catholic-Hierarchy.org. (for Chronology of Bishops) ^{[self-published]}
- Chow, Gabriel. "Archdiocese of Crotone-Santa Severina". GCatholic.org. (for Chronology of Bishops) ^{[self-published]}

Catholic Church titles
Preceded by Niceforo Melisseno Comneno	Bishop of Crotone; 1638–1664	Succeeded by Girolamo Carafa
