= Francesco Martelli =

Italian Roman Catholic Cardinal

Francesco Martelli (1633 – 28 September 1717) was an Italian Roman Catholic Cardinal.

== Biography ==
Martelli was born in Florence of a patrician family.

He studied canon and civil law in the University of Pisa and became canon of the cathedral chapter of Florence. Later, he was made relator of the Sacred Congregation of good government in the pontificate of Pope Clement IX. Then he was appointed referendary of the Tribunals of the Apostolic Signature of Justice and of Grace and governor of Faenza (later of Spoleto and vice-legate in Ferrara). He was ordained priest on 8 September 1675. Over time, he held various administrative and governing roles in the Papal states: for instance, he served as governor of several territories and also as vice-legate in Ferrara.

He was elected titular Latin Archbishop of Corinth on 9 September 1675. On 20 September 1675, he was appointed Apostolic nuncio in Poland, a post he held for six years. During his time in Poland, he dealt with diplomatic issues on behalf of the King John III Sobieski of Poland and neighboring countries, working to form alliances with an anti-Turkish interest.

Martelli obtained the title of secretary in the Roman Curia by Pope Innocent XI. On 21 July 1698, he was promoted to the titular patriarchate of Jerusalem.

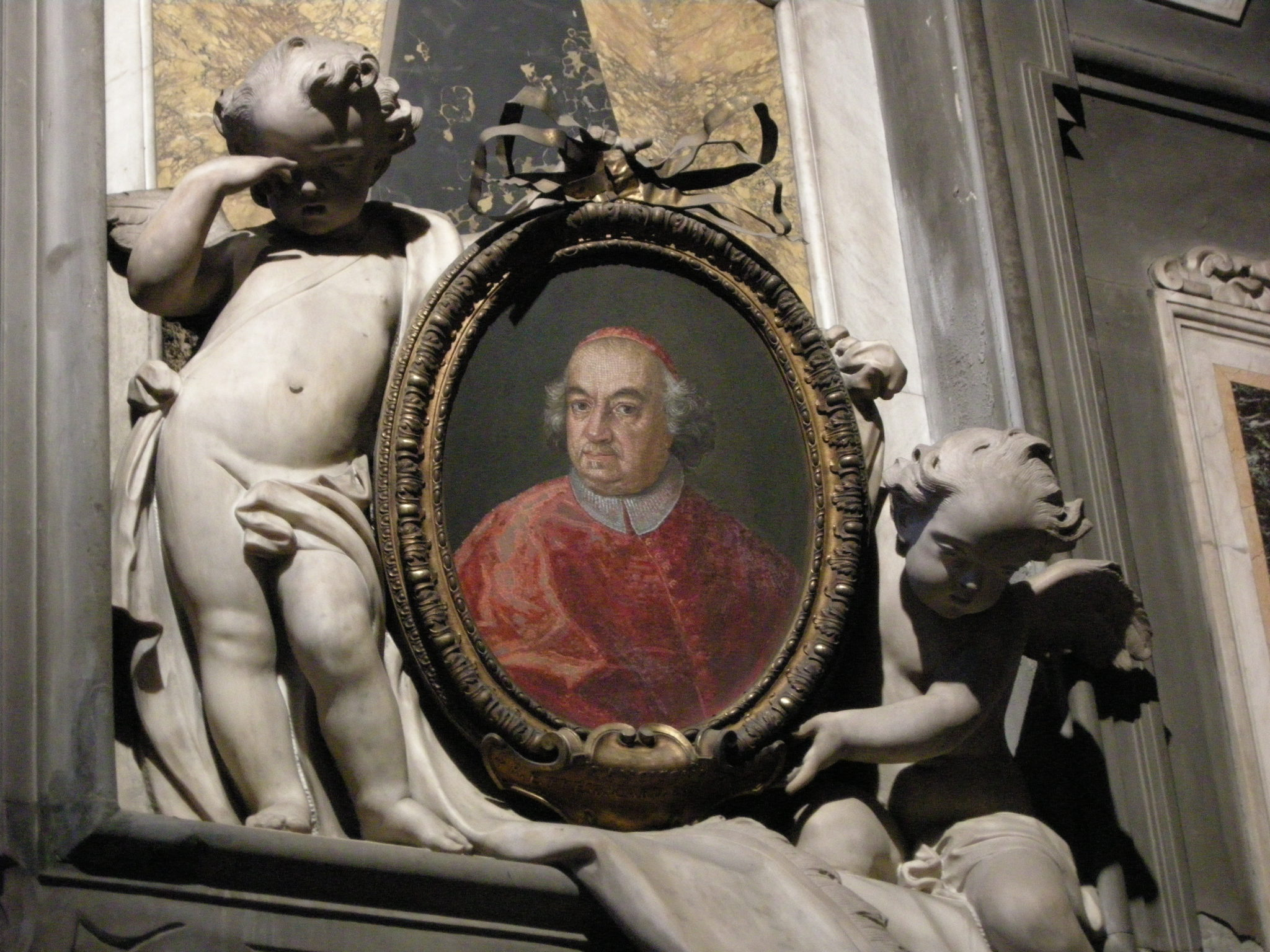
Tomb of Francesco Martelli, Florence.

Francesco Martelli was created cardinal priest in the consistory of 17 May 1706 by Pope Clement XI with the title of Sant'Eusebio. He retired because of gout and died in 1717, in Rome. His funeral monument is in the Martelli Chapel of the church of Santi Michele e Gaetano, Florence. His nephew, Domenico Martelli (1672-1753), was an abbot and prominent art collector.

== Episcopal succession ==
Episcopal succession of Francesco Martelli

While bishop, he was the principal co-consecrator of:

- Marco de Rama, Bishop of Crotone (1690);
- Juraj Parčić, Bishop of Nin (1690);
- Ferdinando Strozza, Titular Archbishop of Tarsus and Apostolic Nuncio to Savoy (1690);
- Francesco Picarelli, Bishop of Narni (1690); and
- Lorenzo Corsini, Titular Archbishop of Nicomedia (1690).
