= Marco de Rama =

Roman Catholic prelate (1649–1709)

Most Reverend Marco de Rama
- Bishop of Crotone
- Church: Catholic Church
- Diocese: Diocese of Crotone
- In office: 1690–1709
- Predecessor: Girolamo Carafa
- Successor: Michele Guardia

Orders
- Consecration: 4 June 1690 by Fabrizio Spada

Personal details
- Born: 1649 Alcala de Henares, Spain
- Died: 4 August 1709 (age 60) Crotone, Italy

Marco de Rama, O.S.A. (1649–1709) was a Roman Catholic prelate who served as Bishop of Crotone (1690–1709).

== Biography ==
Marco de Rama was born in Alcala de Henares, Spain in 1649 and ordained a priest in the Order of Saint Augustine. On 13 February 1690, he selected as Bishop of Crotone and confirmed on 22 May 1690 by Pope Alexander VIII. On 4 June 1690, he was consecrated bishop by Fabrizio Spada, Cardinal-Priest of San Crisogono with Francesco Martelli, Titular Archbishop of Corinthus, and Victor Augustinus Ripa, Bishop of Vercelli, serving as co-consecrators. He served as Bishop of Crotone until his death on 4 August 1709.

== External links and additional sources ==
- Cheney, David M. "Archdiocese of Crotone-Santa Severina". Catholic-Hierarchy.org. (for Chronology of Bishops) ^{[self-published]}
- Chow, Gabriel. "Archdiocese of Crotone-Santa Severina". GCatholic.org. (for Chronology of Bishops) ^{[self-published]}

Catholic Church titles
Preceded by Girolamo Carafa	Bishop of Crotone; 1690–1709	Succeeded by Michele Guardia
