= Michael of Zahumlje =

Michael of Zahumlje Mihajlo Višević
- Prince of Zahumlje ("dux Chulmorum")
- Reign: floruit c. 910 – 935
- Family: Višević
- Father: Busebutze
- Religion: Christian

Michael of Zahumlje (reign usually dated c. 910–935), also known as Michael Višević (Serbo-Croatian: Mihailo Višević, Serbian Cyrillic: Михаило Вишевић) or rarely as Michael Vuševukčić, was a semi-independent, or independent Slavic ruler of Zahumlje, in present-day central Herzegovina and southern Croatia, who flourished in the early part of the 10th century. Prince Michael of Zahumlje had a common boundary with the Kingdom of Croatia and with Serbia, but was an ally of Bulgaria. He was nevertheless able to maintain independent rule throughout at least a majority of his reign.

Michael came into territorial conflict with Petar of Serbia, who expand his power to the province of Narenta or Pagania, west from the Neretva River. To eliminate the threat, Michael warned his ally, the Bulgarian Tsar Simeon I, about the alliance between Petar and Symeon's enemy, the Byzantine Empire. Symeon attacked Serbia and captured Petar, who later died in prison.

Michael was mentioned together with Tomislav of Croatia in Pope John X's letter of 925. In that same year, he participated in the first council of Split, which some historians have taken as evidence of Zahumlje being a vassal of Croatia. Regardless, Michael, with grand titles of the Byzantine court as anthypatos and patrician (patrikios), remained ruler of Zahumlje through the 940s, while maintaining good relations with the Pope.

== Background ==
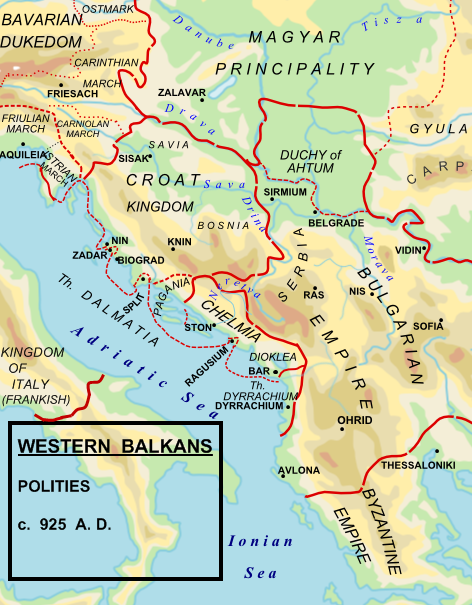
Map of the territorial extent of Zahumlje (Chelmia) at its zenith during Michael's reign, between the Kingdom of Croatia and the Bulgarian Empire.

Compiled in c. 950, the historical work De administrando imperio, ascribed to Byzantine Emperor Constantine Porphyrogenitus, notes that Michael was a son of Busebutze (Greek: Bouseboutzis > Visevitz), but does not mention that his family descended from the "unbaptized Serbs" or was of Serbian origin like other Zachlumians, although a closer reading of the source suggests that Constantine's consideration on the ethnic identity of the principality's population is based on Serbian political rule or influence and does not indicate ethnic origin.

According to the emperor, or even Michael himself according to the way the subchapter was structured, his family was not of Serbian origin since they belonged to the Litziki (Λιτζίκη), an unbaptized people on the river Vistula in Lesser Poland. His "own hostility to Serbia suggests that his family was in fact not Serb". According to Tibor Živković, the area of the Vistula where the ancestors of Michael originate was the place where White Croats would be expected and not White Serbs, and it's unclear whether the Zachlumians "in the migration period to the Balkans really were Serbs or Croats or Slavic tribes which in alliance with Serbs or Croats arrived in the Balkans", while according to Francis Dvornik the Zachlumians "had a closer bond of interest with the Croats than with the Serbs, since they seem to have migrated to their new home not with the Serbs, but with the Croats". Michael's tribal origin is related to the oral tradition from Historia Salonitana by Thomas the Archdeacon about seven or eight tribes of nobles called Lingones who arrived from Poland and settled in Croatia.

The area controlled by Michael comprised Zahumlje, later known as Hum (what is now western Herzegovina and southern Croatia), as well as Travunia (now eastern Herzegovina and southern Croatia with center at Trebinje) and majority of Duklja (modern Montenegro). His territory therefore formed a block along the southern Dalmatian coast, from the Neretva river to Ragusa (Dubrovnik), latter serving as a tributary region.

Bulgaria did not yet border on Zahumlje and a part of Croatia lay between both lands. For instance, the chronicler John the Deacon (d. 1009) says that in 912, a Venetian traveller who had just passed through Bulgaria and Croatia on his way home, next found himself in Zahumlje.

"Qui (Petrus) dum Chroatorum fines rediens transire vellet, a Michahele Sclavorum duce fraude deceptus...
[While he (Peter) was returning from Croatian territory he was deceived through fraud by Michael, duke of the Slavs...]"

-Chronicon Venetum, John the Deacon

== Alliance with Simeon I of Bulgaria ==
The earliest occurrence of Michael in the sources is from 912. Venetian chronicler John the Deacon recorded that at that time Pietro, son of the Venetian doge Ursus Particiacus II (912–932), was treacherously captured on his return from a diplomatic mission to Constantinople by Michael, "a prince of the Slavs" (dux Sclavorum), when he wanted to pass through the lands of the Croats. Before Pietro entered Croatia, on his way home, when he entered Zahumlje, or when he entered province of Narenta or Pagania, Michael dux Sclavorum had him captured and sent as a gift to Simeon I of Bulgaria. Since 912, Michael was a close ally of Simeon I of Bulgaria, who had been mounting a number of successful campaigns against the Byzantine Empire.

Simeon's march for power posed such a great threat to the Byzantine Empire that it looked for allies in the area. Leo Rhabduchus, the strategos of Dyrrhachium, found one such ally in Serbia, Petar, who had been subject to Bulgaria since 897. Petar had been busy extending his power westwards, and appears to have come into territorial conflict with Michael in the process of doing so. Constantine writes that Michael, "his jealousy aroused by this", warned Symeon of the conspiracy. Symeon attacked Serbia and captured Petar, who died in prison. Most scholars prefer to date the war on Serbia to 917, after 20 August, when Simeon had massacred much of the invading Byzantine army at its landing place at Anchialos. In 924, Simeon conquered Serbia and, instead of appointing a vassal to govern on his behalf, placed it under his direct authority. In effect, Simeon became a neighbour of Michael and of Croatia, which was then under King Tomislav and had good relations with Byzantium. It seems probable that Michael remained loyal to Simeon until the latter's death in 927.

== Church councils of Split ==
The sources show Michael involved in important church affairs which were conducted on Croatian territory in the mid-920s. Two councils of Split (Latin: Spalatum), in 925 and 928, which officially established or confirmed the recognition of Split as the archiepiscopal see of all Dalmatia (rather than just the Byzantine cities). Another major issue of concern was the language of liturgy: since the conversion of the Slavs by Cyril and Methodius in the previous century, the Slavic church was accustomed to use Slavonic rather than Latin for its church services.

The Historia Salonitana, whose composition may have begun in the late 13th century, cites a letter of Pope John X to Tomislav, "king (rex) of the Croats", in which he refers to the first council in some detail. If the letter is authentic, it shows that the council was attended not only by the bishops of Croatian and Byzantine Dalmatia, but also by Tomislav, whose territory also included the Byzantine cities of Dalmatia, and by a number of Michael's representatives. In this letter, John describes Michael as "a most excellent" man (excellentissimus dux Chulmorum). The sources have nothing to say about the nature of the relationship between dux Michael and rex Tomislav. Some historians have taken Michael's participation at the church council as well as the difference between their titles as possible evidence that Michael had switched subordinate allegiance to Croatia. John V. A. Fine, however, disagrees this line of reasoning, saying that the events represented an important ecclesiastical affair for all Dalmatia and stood under papal authority. Moreover, Michael appears to have retained a neutral position when Croatia and Bulgaria were at war in 926 and so it may be that Michael was on good terms with the rulers of both lands at the same time. It is uncertain whether the inscription and depiction of a Slavic ruler in the Church of St. Michael in Ston is a reference to Michael of Zahumlje, the 11th century Mihailo I of Duklja or St. Michael himself.

On 10 July 926, 'Michael, rex Sclavorum' took possession of the port of Siponto, controlled by Byzantium. Therefore, it seems certain that in July 926 Michael did not act as an imperial ally in Apulia, nor that his fleet descended upon the shores of the Apennine peninsula as a rescue force against Arabs, Lombards or any other enemy. The only enemy that threatened Siponto in 926 was Michael, 'rex Sclavorum' as Bulgarian ally. Michael apparently sacked Siponto (Latin: Sipontum), which was a Byzantine town in Apulia on 10 July 926. It remains unknown if he did this by Tomislav's supreme command as suggested by some historians. Interestingly, Constantine in his De administrando imperio makes no mention of Michael's raid, nor does he mention Church councils in Split.

== Later years ==
Constantine remembers Michael as a prince (archon) of the Zachlumi, but also uses such grand titles of the Byzantine court as anthypatos and patrician (patrikios) to describe his political rank and status. These titles have been interpreted as reflecting a more subordinate position after Simeon's death in 927, when Michael lost the Bulgarian support needed for any higher recognition. Michael does not appear in the sources for events after 925, but historian Fine thinks that his reign lasted into the 940s. Časlav, who became ruler of Serbia after Symeon's death, may have seized some of Michael's territory while securing his conquest of Travunia, but there's no evidence for it and in DAI Zachlumia is clearly stated as a separate polity. 13th century Thomas the Archdeacon claimed that the Croatian kingdom included Zachlumia before and after Stephen Držislav (969–997), but that's also disputable.
