= Juraj Divnić =

Juraj Divnić (Giorgio Difnico)
- Bishop of Nin
- Church: Catholic Church
- See: Bishop of Nin
- Appointed: 19 March 1479
- Term ended: 8 August 1530
- Predecessor: Giacomo Bragadeno
- Successor: Jakob Divnić (Giacomo Difnico)

Orders
- Consecration: 9 May 1479 (Bishop) by Maffeo Gherardi Patriarch of Venice

Personal details
- Born: c. 1440 Šibenik, Venetian Republic
- Died: 8 August 1530 Zadar, Venetian Republic
- Buried: Chapel of Our Lady of the Hare, Cathedral, Nin

Juraj Divnić (Italian: Giorgio Difnico, Croatian: Juraj Divnić, Latin: Georgius Diphnicus, c. 1440 – 1530) was bishop of Nin. He was one of the more important Catholic bishops of Croatian origin in his time.

== Life ==
Juraj Divnić was born in Šibenik around 1440 and was part of the known Divnić family, which settled in Šibenik in the 14th century from Skradin. He studied the Law probably in Italy and entered the ecclesiastic career. On 3 July 1464, he became titular of the church of St. Mary Magdalene in the peninsula of Mandalina (now part of the town of Šibenik). In the same year, he was made beneficiary also of the estates of a church on the island of Zlarin.

On 19 March 1479, he was appointed bishop of Nin. He received the minor orders in Venice on 1 May 1479; in the following two days, he was ordained deacon and priest; and on the next Sunday, 9 May, he was consecrated bishop in the patriarchal church of Venice by Patriarch Maffeo Gherardi.

In 1482, Juraj Divnić visited Rome. In 1486, he was authorized by the pope to live near Zadar. He participated in the wars for defending the Croatia from the Ottomans, being a witness to the Battle of Krbava and defending Nin during the siege of 1499. He did not participate in the Lateran Council of 1512 – 1517, so as not to leave his flock, threatened by Ottomans. Juraj Divnić approved the Marian apparition that occurred in May 1516 on a little island near Nin, known as Our Lady of the Hare.

Due to his old age, in 1523 Juraj Divnić asked Pope Adrian VI to be allowed to retire and be succeeded by his nephew Jakob. The Pope agreed but ordered that he maintained the title of bishop of Nin. In 1528 he restored the Cathedral of Nin (now Church of St. Anselm), supplied new religious furnishings, and prepared his tomb. He died in Zadar on 8 August 1530, and he was buried in the side chapel of Our Lady of the Hare, in the cathedral of Nin, where is still present his sepulchral inscription.

== Works ==
His only literary work which has survived is a long letter written in Latin on 27 September 1493 to Pope Alexander VI about the Battle of Krbava, where the Croatian army was destroyed by the Ottoman cavalry. The Latin text is preserved in the Biblioteca Marciana, Ms Lat. Cl. X cod. 174, and it was translated in Croatian in 1983.
