= Juraj Parčić =

Venetian Roman Catholic prelate

- Bishop of Nin
- Church: Catholic Church
- Diocese: Diocese of Nin
- In office: 1690–1703
- Predecessor: Giovanni Vusich
- Successor: Martino Dragolovich

Orders
- Consecration: 4 Jun 1690 by Fabrizio Spada

Personal details
- Born: 28 April 1658 Sebenico, Republic of Venice (now Šibenik, Croatia)
- Died: February 1703 (aged 44) Nona, Republic of Venice (now Nin, Croatia)

Juraj Parčić (Latin: Georgius Parchich, Italian: Giorgio Parchich; 1658–1703) was a Croatian prelate of the Catholic Church who served as the bishop of Nin from 1690 to 1703.

== Biography ==
Juraj Parčić was born in Sebenico (Šibenik), Republic of Venice (now Croatia) on 28 April 1658.

On 8 May 1690, he was appointed during the papacy of Pope Alexander VIII as Bishop of Nin (Latin: episcopus Nonensis). On 4 June 1690, he was consecrated bishop by Fabrizio Spada, Cardinal-Priest of San Crisogono with Francesco Martelli, titular Archbishop of Corinthus, and Victor Augustinus Ripa, Bishop of Vercelli, serving as co-consecrators.

When notable hajduk Ilija Janković Mitrović died in 1692, Parchich attended his funeral at Islam Grčki, despite Mitrović not being a Catholic. The local Serbian Orthodox priest forbade Parčić to carry out a requiem, of which he informed the Congregation of Propaganda on 8 July 1692.

On 13 April 1692, during the Morean War fought between Venice and the Ottoman Empire, Parčić reported that the Diocese of Nin had 5,486 Catholic and 7,363 Eastern Orthodox Christian inhabitants. The same year, Parčić reported to Rome that he managed to "bring to obedience" all Eastern Orthodox Christians in his diocese, while his general vicar Karlo de Rossi writes at the same time that half of the diocese is "schismatic". Mile Bogović explains the conflicting reports by noting that the Venetian government considered all Christians on its territory, regardless of rite, to be Catholics. In contrast, others, mainly the Latin-rite bishops, considered only members of the Latin Church to be Catholics. The number of converts was often inflated in reports to emphasise the pastoral work of a certain bishop, while, at the same time, a large number of "schismatics" in a diocese wasn't considered commendable.

In 1700, after the peace treaty with the Ottomans, the Serbian Orthodox archbishop Atanasije Ljubojević of Dabar-Bosnia, claiming the territory of the diocese of Nin, arrived there from the Ottoman Bosnia and Herzegovina. However, Parčić managed to divert his aim to subject the Catholic population to his jurisdiction.

He served as the bishop of Nin until his death in February 1703. He was styled "Eminentiarum Vestrarum Humillimus Addictissimus, et Obseqentissimus Servus Georgius Parchich, Episcopus Nonensis".

Catholic Church titles
Preceded by Giovanni Vusich	Bishop of Nin; 1690–1703	Succeeded by Martino Dragolovich
