= Andrea della Valle =

Catholic cardinal

His Eminence Andrea della Valle
- Cardinal-Bishop of Palestrina
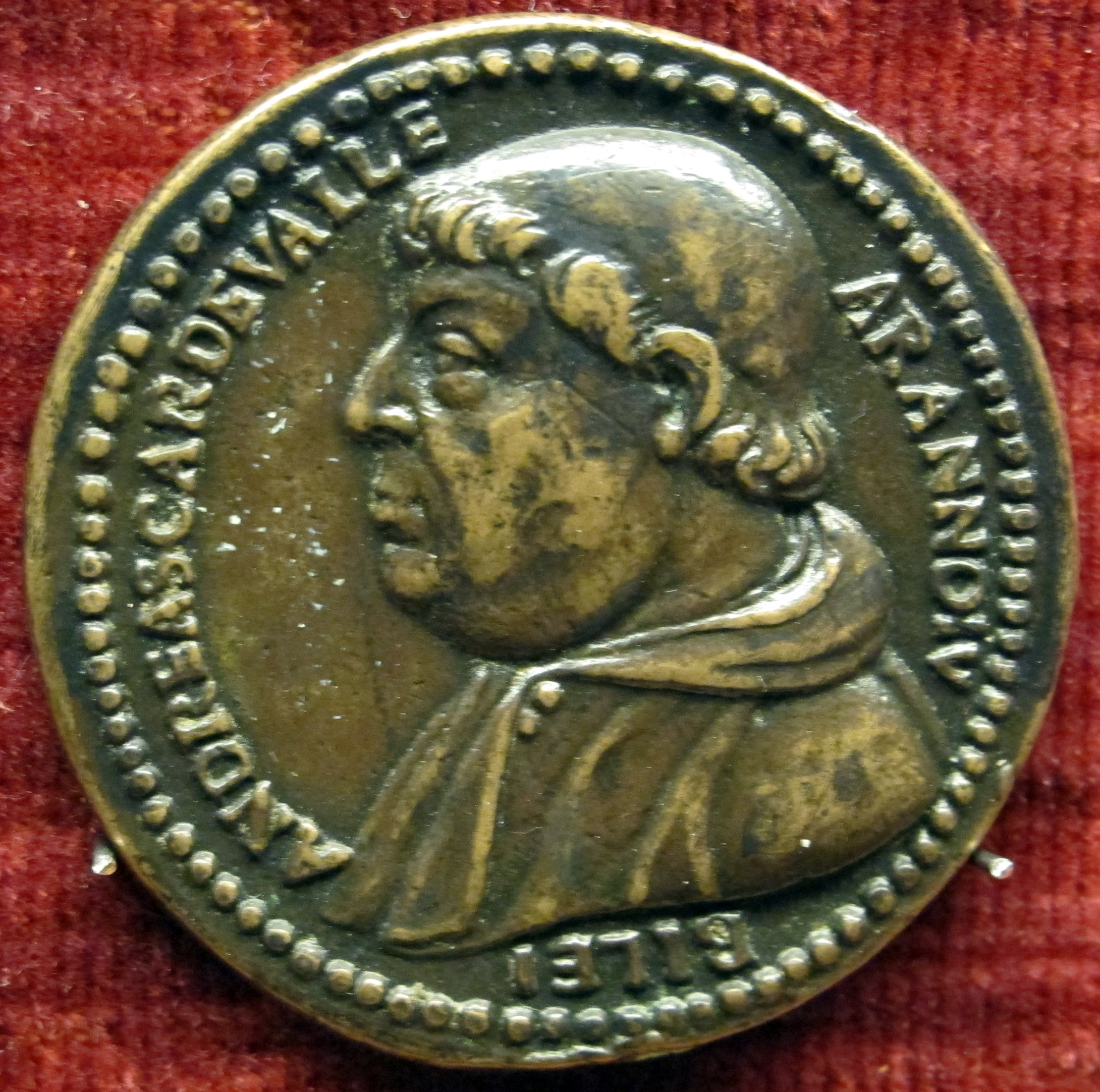
- Church: Catholic Church
- Appointed: 12 December 1533
- Term ended: 4 August 1534
- Predecessor: Giovanni Piccolomini
- Successor: Bonifacio Ferrero
- Previous posts: Bishop of Crotone (1496–1508); Cardinal-Priest of Santa Prisca (1533–1554)

Orders
- Created cardinal: 1 July 1517 by Pope Leo X
- Rank: Cardinal-Bishop

Personal details
- Born: 29 November 1463 Rome, Papal States
- Died: 4 July 1534 (aged 70) --

Cardinal Andrea della Valle (29 November 1463, in Rome – 3 August 1534) was an Italian clergyman and art collector.

== Life ==
Andrea belonged to an ancient family of Roman nobles. He was the son of Filippo della Valle, a Roman patrician; the family tomb is in Santa Maria in Aracoeli, where an inscription to their father was placed by Andrea and his brother Bartolomeo. Andrea also had a sister, Sigismonda.

Andrea was elected bishop of Crotone in 1496. In 1503-05 he directed the Apostolic Chancery and served as Apostolic secretary during the pontificate of Pope Julius II. He was transferred to the titular diocese of Miletus in 1508, which he resigned in favour of his nephew Quinzio Rustici on 26 November 1523. He participated in the Fifth Lateran Council, 1512, and was created cardinal priest in the consistory of 1 July 1517. He participated in the conclaves of 1521-22 and 1523. As archpriest of the patriarchal Liberian basilica (1520) he ceremonially opened and closed the Holy Door in the Jubilee Year of 1525.

Beyond his clerical career, Cardinal della Valle was one of the most prominent art collectors and antiquarians in Rome during the High Renaissance. He undertook a major renovation of his family's residence, the Palazzo della Valle, transforming its courtyard into an innovative sculpture garden. This "hanging garden" (or hortus pensilis) was designed by the architect Lorenzetto and was specifically created to display his renowned collection of ancient Roman sculptures and inscriptions. His collection, which included the famous "Della Valle Satyrs" (one of which is pictured), was a model for other Roman collections and was documented by artists like Maarten van Heemskerck. In 1584, the collection was purchased by Cardinal Ferdinand de' Medici and most of the pieces were transferred to Florence, where they are now displayed in the Uffizi Gallery and Palazzo Pitti.

== Art collector ==
Cardinal della Valle is best remembered, however, as the collector of one of the first collections of Roman antiquities that marked the High Renaissance. He inherited some antiquities, which had been collected by the della Valle in the previous century, according to Vasari. and eagerly acquired more. Inspired by the Cortile del Belvedere, in 1520 he commissioned the Rafaellesque sculptor architect Lorenzetto Lotti to create a suitable setting for the sculptures and inscriptions and other antiquities that he had amassed, the result of a generation of rediscoveries at the turn of the 16th century. On the main floor of the palazzo's new second inner courtyard, the sculptures were displayed in a sort of loggia, described by Giorgio Vasari as a hortus pensilis or hanging garden (giardino di sopra) that included planted raised boxes and an aviary, which "blurred the distinction between garden and courtyard," with inscriptions inviting peace, relaxation and thought, an invocation of rus in urbe. The architectural framing and the great care with which the ensemble was presented— as decorative as it was scholarly, evoking Classical harmony, symmetry and equilibrium, was a model for other Roman collections. Many visitors left written impressions during the 16th century, and more than one artist made sketches.

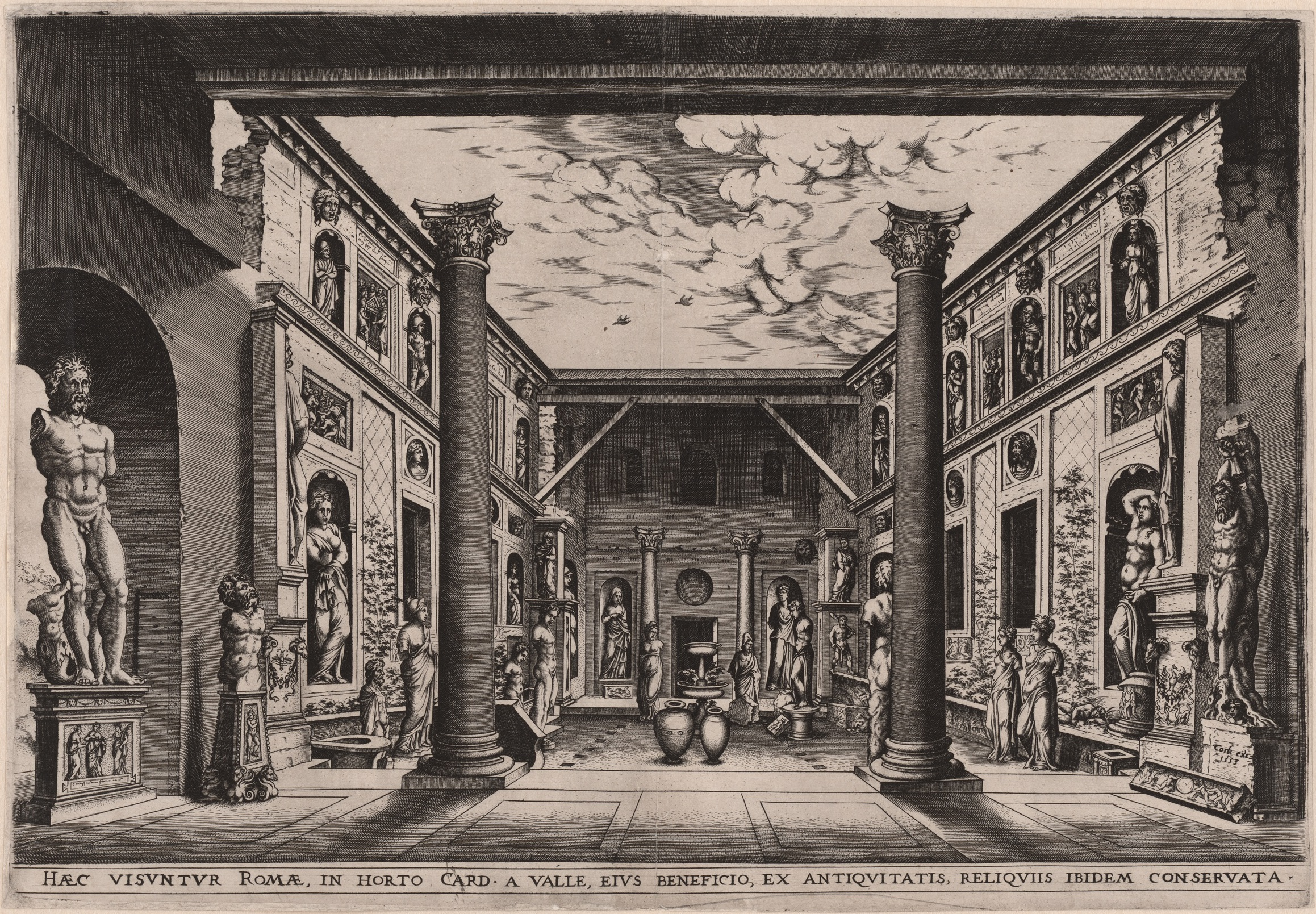
Cardinal Andrea della Valle's courtyard, engraving by Hieronymus Cock

Maarten van Heemskerck's early drawing of the loggia, showing the two famous armless satyrs supporting baskets on their heads, set against the piers of the arches, was etched by Hieronymus Cock in 1558 and circulated among connoisseurs of the Antique. Here, in the serene and ordered presentation that was eventually developed in the 1520s and 30s by Lorenzetto— Heemskerck's drawing still shows a picturesque disorder— were undertaken the first systematic restorations and completions of Roman sculptural fragments, work that, according to Vasari's anecdotes, had occasionally been undertaken piecemeal for the Medici by Donatello and Verrocchio, but which became common practice and developed into a Roman industry during the sixteenth century; Vasari, following his description of della Valle's antiquities, remarks, "And to tell the truth, these antiquities restored in this manner have much more grace than those mutilated trunks, members without heads or figures defective and incomplete in any other way".

At his death the Palazzo Valle passed to his nephew, Camillo Capranica, of another antiquities-collecting family and gained the name Palazzo Valle-Capranica, while the collection was housed separately, in the palazzo of bishop Bruto Della Valle; there it was inspected by Gabriele Simeoni in 1557, who left descriptions in French and Italian. In 1584 the collection was purchased en bloc by Cardinal Ferdinand de' Medici and dispersed among various Medici dwellings. Most of the collection is at the Villa de Medici in Rome, but part was transferred to Florence, where della Valle sculptures can be seen today in the Palazzo Pitti and the Boboli Gardens, in the Uffizi, and at the Medici villa at Poggio Imperiale. Some—like the collection's prize menologium rusticam—were lost in the process.

A theatre was built in the Cardinal's courtyard, which gave its name to the via Teatro Valle.

Catholic Church titles
Preceded by	Bishop of Crotone (1st term); 1496-1508	Succeeded by Antonio Lucifero
Preceded by Francesco della Rovere	Bishop of Mileto; 1508-1523	Succeeded by Quinzio Rustici
Preceded by	Cardinal-Priest of Sant'Agnese in Agone; 1517-1525	Succeeded by Claude de Longwy de Givry
Preceded by Oliviero Carafa	Administrator of Caiazzo; 1517-1518	Succeeded by Ascanio Parisani
Preceded by Francisco de Remolins	Administrator of Gallipoli; 1518-1524	Succeeded by Jerónimo Muñoz
Preceded by Franciotto Orsini	Administrator of Nicastro; 1518	Succeeded by Giovanni Pietro Ricci
Preceded by Giovanni Battista Cavicchio	Administrator of Valva e Sulmona; 1519-1521	Succeeded by Cristóbal de los Ríos
Preceded by Leonardo Grosso della Rovere	Archpriest of the Basilica di Santa Maria Maggiore; 1520-1534	Succeeded by Paolo Emilio Cesi
Preceded by Niccolò Fieschi	Administrator of Umbriatico; 1521-1522	Succeeded by Giovanni Matteo Lucifero
Preceded by Antonio Lucifero	Bishop of Crotone (2nd term); 1522-1524	Succeeded by Giovanni Matteo Lucifero
Preceded by Niccolò Fieschi	Cardinal-Priest of Santa Prisca; 1525-1534	Succeeded by Gianvincenzo Carafa
Preceded by Giovanni Domenico de Cupis	Cardinal-Bishop of Albano; 1533	Succeeded by Bonifacio Ferrero
Preceded by Giovanni Piccolomini	Cardinal-Bishop of Palestrina; 1533-1534	Succeeded by Bonifacio Ferrero
