= Councils of Split =

Several church councils held in Split

There have been several church councils held in the town of Split in the early Middle Ages, and whose conclusions have significance for the whole territory of the early Croatian Kingdom.

Since the 920's the Byzantine Empire had become considerably weakened in the region, so Emperor Romanos I gave management over Dalmatia to the Croatian King Tomislav who needed it in order to connect the church authorities in Croatia and Dalmatia so he could easily integrate Dalmatia into his Kingdom. This transfer of power is attested by the fact that the Byzantine governor of Dalmatia wasn't listed as one of the participants on the official council documents.

== Council of 925 ==
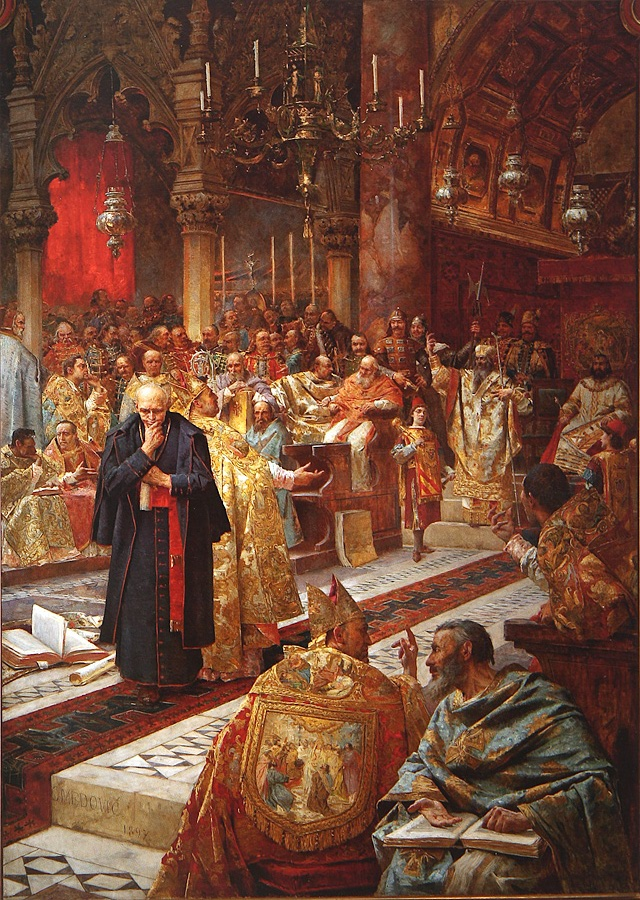
Church council in Split, Celestin Medović

The first Church Council of Split was convened by Pope John X in the year 925. The main task of this Council was solving issues of the ecclesiastical jurisdiction in the Kingdom of Croatia and the eradication of the Slavic language and the Glagolitic alphabet in the liturgy.

Just before the beginning of the Council session the Pope sent two of his legacies, John, Bishop of Ancona and Leon, Bishop of Palestine, to give one invitation letter to each of the Slavic rulers, Archbishop of Split and other Dalmatian bishops.

During the Council session, which was attended by the Croatian King Tomislav, Prince Michael of Zahumlje, and other unnamed Croatian and Serbian or urban Dalmatian nobles (Croatorum atque Serborum/Urborum proceribus), various ecclesiastical organization and discipline issues were discussed, while 15 conclusions were adopted. Most important question was one about the seat of the newly founded ecclesiastical province of Croatia and Dalmatia. Contenders for the seat of Metropolitan were: John, Archbishop of Split, as the successor of Salona Church founded by alleged student of Saint Peter Saint Domnius, Formin, Bishop of Zadar, as representative of Zadar, capital of Dalmatia, and Gregory, Bishop of Nin, whose diocese was territoriality the largest. Article 1 of the Councils decisions states that "seat of the newly founded ecclesiastical province will be granted to the church and city where the bones of Saint Domnius lie", i.e. Archbishop John of Split.

Furthermore, articles 2, 3, 8 and 9 state that delegates agreed upon the issue of borders between individual dioceses, and on questions about regulation of the church estates (articles 4 and 5). Article 14 defines that the connection between Christian marriage and education of clerics is unbreakable, while article 15 regulates question of clerical marriage. Penalties in the case of serious crimes such as murder of master, priest or ruler are contained in articles 6, 7 and 13. Article 11 specifically emphasizes that the bishop of Nin is suffragan bishop of the Split Metropolitan. Article 10 prohibited the ordination and promotion of those priests who didn't know Latin, except if there wasn't enough priests in the area. This decision was directed against the Glagolitic clergy and those who served mass in Slavic language because Pope didn't understand it so he was afraid that those priests might spread heresy.

== Council of 928 ==
Second Church Council of Split was convened because Bishop of Nin Gregory appealed to the Pope because he thought there were some irregularities on the first council. Namely. Gregory thought that Archbishop of Split was appointed Metropolitan because of his reputation and wealth, and connections he had in Rome, rather than because he was better than other candidates. Second council was convened in 928, and was chaired by the papal legate bishop Madalberta. This Council confirmed the conclusions from the first Council. The most important decision that was made on this council was the one about abolition of the Diocese of Nin "because it didn't have tradition from the ancient times". Council offered Bishop Gregory to choose one of three free dioceses in exchange. He later took Diocese of Skradin, as ordered by Pope Leo VI. Archbishop of Split was given right to govern all parishes on the Croatian territory. All bishops were rebuked for trying to take territory from each other, and were also urged to obey to the Archbishop of Split.

== Council of 1060 ==
The Third Church Council was convened in Split in year 1060. Councilors concluded that all priests have to know Latin, although neither Glagolitic nor Slavic were banned. A part of clergy, mostly from islands in the Kvarner Gulf, was against these reforms so they chose their own bishop that sided with them. Eventually, side that was for reforms won, so Peter Krešimir IV issued many grants.

== Annotations ==
1. There's a scholarly dispute whether in the original manuscript was written Serborum or Urborum meaning that alongside Croatian nobles were also present or Serbian nobles or nobles from urban Dalmatian cities.
