= Antonio Lucifero =

Most Reverend Antonio Lucifero
- Bishop of Crotone
- Church: Catholic Church
- Diocese: Diocese of Crotone
- In office: 1508–1521
- Predecessor: Andrea della Valle
- Successor: Andrea della Valle

Personal details
- Died: 1521 Crotone, Italy

Antonio Lucifero (died 1521) was a Roman Catholic prelate who served as Bishop of Crotone (1508–1521).

== Biography ==
On 15 March 1508, Antonio Lucifero was appointed during the papacy of Pope Julius II as Bishop of Crotone. He served as Bishop of Crotone until his death in 1521.

== External links and additional sources ==
- Cheney, David M. "Archdiocese of Crotone-Santa Severina". Catholic-Hierarchy.org. (for Chronology of Bishops) ^{[self-published]}
- Chow, Gabriel. "Archdiocese of Crotone-Santa Severina". GCatholic.org. (for Chronology of Bishops) ^{[self-published]}

Catholic Church titles
Preceded by Andrea della Valle	Bishop of Crotone; 1508–1521	Succeeded by Andrea della Valle
