= Giovanni Vusich =

Most Reverend Giovanni Vusich
- Bishop of Nona
- Church: Catholic Church
- Diocese: Diocese of Nona
- In office: 1688–1689
- Predecessor: Giovanni Borgoforte
- Successor: Juraj Parčić

Orders
- Consecration: 27 June 1688 by Gasparo Carpegna

Personal details
- Born: 4 July 1647 Venice, Italy
- Died: Oct 1689 (age 42) Nin, Croatia

Giovanni Vusich (1647–1689) was a Roman Catholic prelate who served as Bishop of Nona (1688–1689).

== Biography ==
Giovanni Vusich was born in Venice, Italy on 4 July 1647. On 14 June 1688, he was appointed during the papacy of Pope Innocent XI as Bishop of Nona. On 27 June 1688, he was consecrated bishop by Gasparo Carpegna, Cardinal-Priest of San Silvestro in Capite, with Stephanus Cosimi, Archbishop of Split, and Pier Antonio Capobianco, Bishop Emeritus of Lacedonia, serving as co-consecrators. He served as Bishop of Nona until his death in October 1689.

Catholic Church titles
Preceded by Giovanni Borgoforte	Bishop of Nona; 1688–1689	Succeeded by Juraj Parčić
