= Giovanni Borgoforte =

Most Reverend Giovanni Borgoforte
- Bishop of Nona
- Church: Catholic Church
- Diocese: Diocese of Nona
- In office: 1677–1687
- Predecessor: Francesco Grassi
- Successor: Giovanni Vusich

Orders
- Consecration: 30 November 1677 by Paluzzo Paluzzi Altieri Degli Albertoni

Personal details
- Born: 1640 Trau, Croatia
- Died: September 1687 (age 47) Nona, Croatia

Giovanni Borgoforte (1640–1687) was a Roman Catholic prelate who served as Bishop of Nona (1677–1687).

== Biography ==
Giovanni Borgoforte was born in Trau, Croatia in 1640. On 22 November 1677, he was appointed during the papacy of Pope Innocent XI as Bishop of Nona. On 30 November 1677, he was consecrated bishop by Paluzzo Paluzzi Altieri Degli Albertoni, Camerlengo of the Sacred College of Cardinals, with Prospero Bottini, Titular Archbishop of Myra, and Lodovico Magni, Bishop of Acquapendente, serving as co-consecrators. He served as Bishop of Nona until his death in September 1687.

Catholic Church titles
Preceded by Francesco Grassi	Bishop of Nona; 1677–1687	Succeeded by Giovanni Vusich
