= Gregory of Nin =

Chalcedonian bishop who introduced the Croatian language in church services

- Bishop of Nin
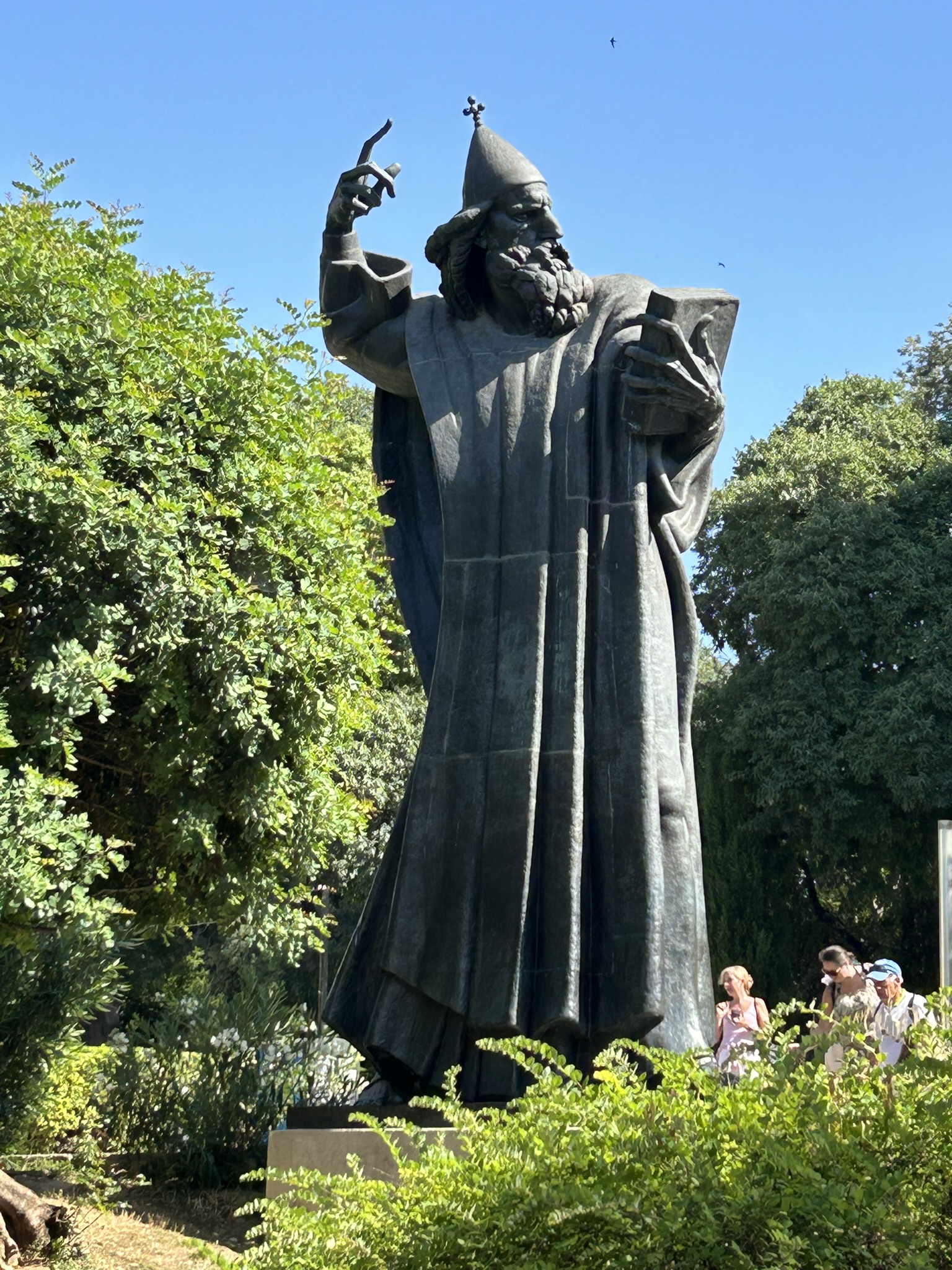
- Statue of Grgur Ninski by Ivan Meštrović in Split, Croatia
- See: Diocese of Zadar (now Archdiocese of Zadar)
- Term ended: c. 929
- Predecessor: Aldefreda
- Successor: Andrija

Orders
- Consecration: c. 900

Personal details
- Denomination: Chalcedonian Christianity

Gregory of Nin (Croatian: Grgur Ninski pronounced [ɡr̩̂ɡuːr nîːnskiː]; Latin: Gregorius Ninnius) was a 10th-century Croatian Catholic prelate who served as Bishop of Nin and was strongly opposed by the Pope and Catholic-Church officialdom.

According to traditional Croatian historiography, after the Great Assembly in 926 Gregory of Nin introduced the Croatian language into Croatian religious services. Till then – the Croatian church being under Rome's jurisdiction before the Great Schism – Croatian church services had been held only in Latin, incomprehensible to most Croatians.

The change of church-service language was important for Croatian language and culture, and it strengthened Christianity within the Croatian Kingdom.

== Historical facts ==
Gregory was Bishop of Nin and was under the strong protection of King Tomislav of Croatia. At the Synod in 925, held in Split, Gregory was subordinated to the Archbishop of Split. He rejected an offer of the Sisak Bishopric. After the first Synod, Gregory complained again in 927–28 but was rebuffed and his Nin bishopric was abolished, Gregory being transferred to the Diocese of Skradin.

== The statue ==
The 8.5-metre (28 ft) tall statue of Gregory of Nin by Ivan Meštrović in Split is a tourist site in the town. Rubbing the statue's toe is said to bring good luck. The toe has been worn smooth and shiny as a result.

The statue was erected in September 1929 in the Peristyle of Diocletian's Palace and can be seen in postcards of the pre-World War II period. In 1941, the statue was moved outside the city by Italian occupying forces. In 1954, it was re-erected in a different location, to the north of the Palace and Old Town of Split, just outside the Golden Gate and near the park Djardin (Croatian: Đardin), where it currently sits. A major restoration of the monument took place between 2013 and 2015.

There are also statues of Gregory of Nin in the cities of Nin and Varaždin.

== See also ==
- History of Croatia
- History of Dalmatia
