= Tomislav, King of Croatia =

Tomislav
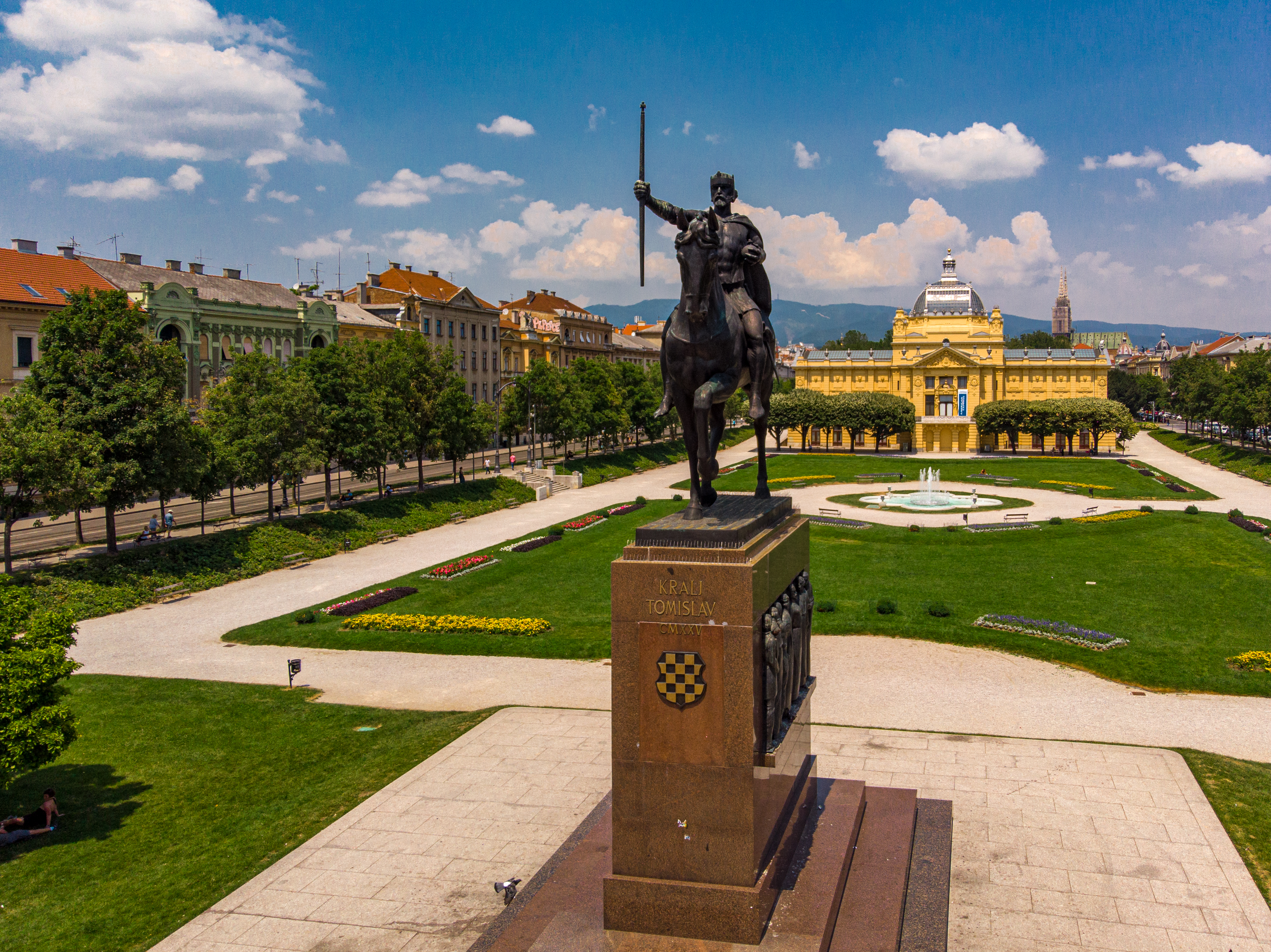
- Equestrian statue of King Tomislav by Robert Frangeš-Mihanović (1947), Zagreb, Croatia

King of Croatia
- Reign: c. 925–928
- Successor: Trpimir II

Duke of Croatia
- Reign: c. 910–925
- Predecessor: Muncimir
- Dynasty: Trpimirović
- Father: Muncimir (suspected)
- Religion: Christianity

Tomislav (pronounced [tômislaʋ], Latin: Tamisclaus) was the first king of Croatia. He became Duke of Croatia c. 910 and was crowned king by 925, reigning until c. 928. During Tomislav's rule, Croatia forged an alliance with the Byzantine Empire against Bulgaria. Croatia's struggles with the First Bulgarian Empire eventually led to war, which culminated in the decisive Battle of the Bosnian Highlands in 926. In the north, Croatia often clashed with the Principality of Hungary; the state retained its borders and, to some extent, expanded with the disintegrated Lower Pannonia.

Tomislav attended the 925 Council of Split, convened by Pope John X, to discuss the use of Slavic languages in liturgy, and ecclesiastical jurisdiction over both Croatia and the Byzantine Theme of Dalmatia. Although the Pope sought to prohibit Slavic liturgy, the council did not agree. Jurisdiction over the region was given to the Archbishop of Split instead of Bishop Gregory of Nin. Since historical information on Tomislav is scarce, the exact years of his accession and death are unknown. The reigns of his successors were marked by a series of civil wars in Croatia and a gradual weakening of the country.

== Reign ==
=== Duke of Croatia ===
Although Tomislav's ancestry is unknown, he might have been a member of the Trpimirović dynasty. There is a nearly twenty-year difference between the first documentation of Tomislav and the last mention of Muncimir, his predecessor as Duke of Croatia. Historical records of Tomislav are scarce, but it is assumed that he was a son of Muncimir. Tomislav succeeded Muncimir, son of Trpimir I, as duke in c. 910 (the most widely accepted view) or after others ruled following Muncimir's death. In any case, Tomislav came to the Croatian throne some time between 910 and 914. In Historia Salonitana (History of Salona), a 13th-century chronicle by Thomas the Archdeacon of Split, Tomislav was mentioned as duke of Croatia in 914.

After the Hungarian conquest of the Carpathian Basin in the late 9th and early 10th centuries, the Hungarians immediately began raiding and expanding their territory. They threatened Lower Pannonia (still nominally under Frankish suzerainty) and killed Braslav, the last Pannonian duke. The Hungarians also fought Croatia, although it was not a primary target of their raids.

The Chronicle of the Priest of Duklja mentions that a Tomislav, the length of whose rule was specified as 13 years, successfully fought the Battle of Drava River with the Hungarians. Since the Venetian chronicler Andrea Dandolo and a notary of King Béla III mention Hungarian victories against Croatia in the same period, however, both sides had gains. Croatia maintained its northern borders and expanded into part of the collapsed Pannonian Duchy, including its former capital Sisak. The plains north of Sisak were difficult to defend against Hungarian cavalry, but Sisak had been well-fortified since the reign of Duke Ljudevit. The sparsely populated area between the Sava and Drava rivers was on the outskirts of Hungary and the Duchy of Croatia (centered on the coast), so neither country could strengthen its rule there after the Duchy of Pannonia dissolved.

East of Croatia, the First Bulgarian Empire's power increased significantly. After a war between the Bulgarian knyaz Boris I and Croatian Duke Trpimir I, Croatian-Bulgarian relations were fairly good. Papal legates regularly crossed Croatian territory (where they received protection) to Bulgaria. The situation changed in the 10th century during the reign of Simeon I, who decided to subordinate the Byzantine Empire to himself.

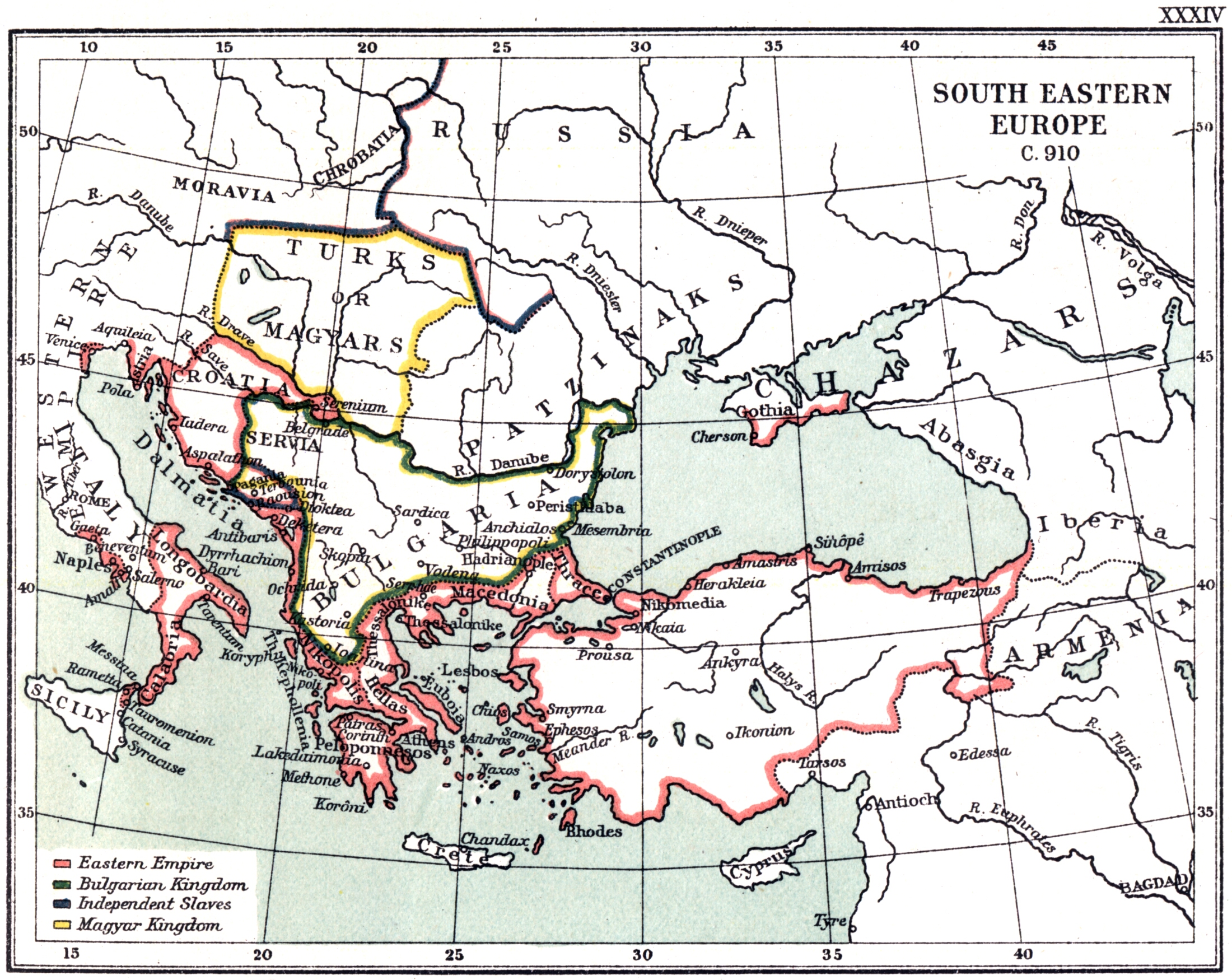
Southeast Europe in 910

Tomislav's realm covered most of southern and central Croatia and the Dalmatian coast, excluding the Theme of Dalmatia, parts of present-day western Herzegovina and northern and western Bosnia. During the early 10th century, Croatia was divided into 11 counties: Livno, Cetina, Imotski, Pliva, Pset, Primorje, Bribir, Nona, Knin, Sidraga, and Nin. Three counties (Lika, Krbava, and Gacka) were ruled by a ban. After its expansion, Tomislav's state presumably contained more than eleven counties. Byzantine emperor and chronicler Constantine VII writes in De Administrando Imperio that at its peak, Croatia could have raised a military force composed of 100,000 infantry, 60,000 horsemen, and a naval fleet of 80 large ships and 100 smaller vessels. However, these figures are viewed as a considerable exaggeration of the size of the Croatian army. According to palaeographic analysis of the manuscript of De Administrando Imperio, the population of medieval Croatia was estimated at 440,000 to 880,000; its military force probably consisted of 20,000–100,000 infantrymen and 3,000–24,000 horsemen organized into 60 allagia.

=== Coronation and Croatian kingdom ===
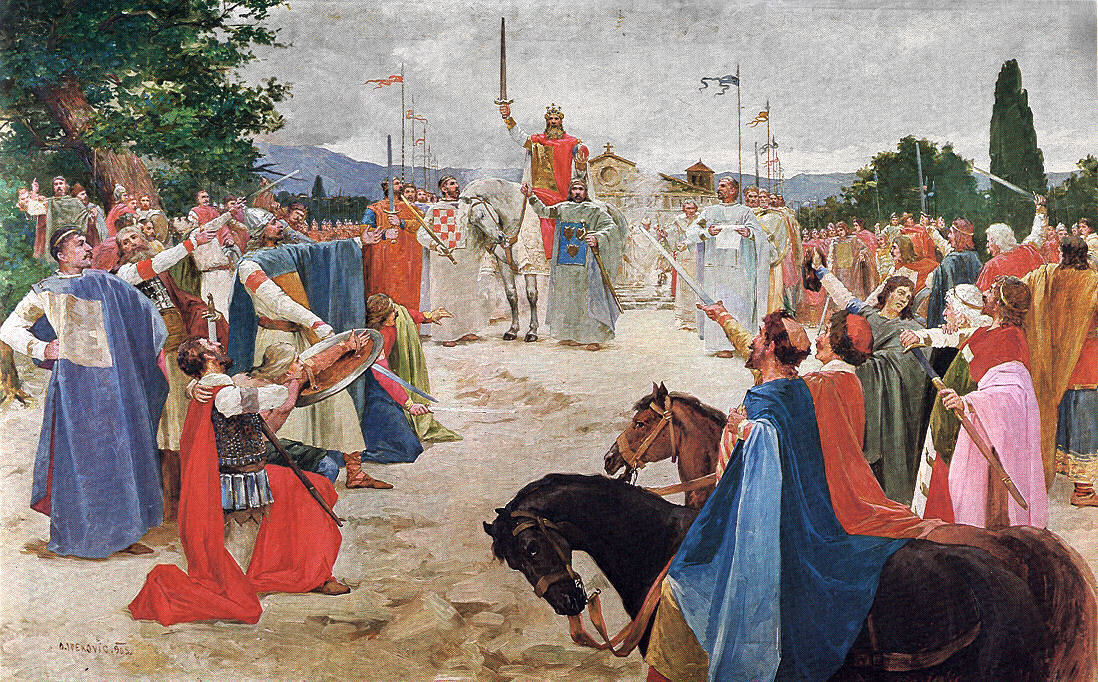
Coronation of King Tomislav (modern painting by Oton Iveković, 1905)

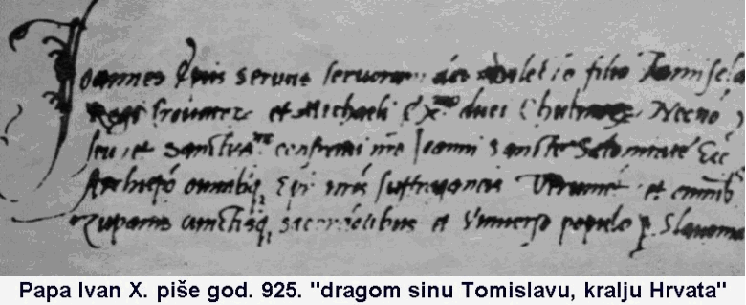
Portion of a transcript of the 925 letter from Pope John X to Tomislav in which he calls Tomislav "king"

Tomislav had become King of Croatia by 925, and was the first Croatian ruler whom the papal chancellery called "king". It is generally said that Tomislav was crowned in 924 or 925, but it is not known exactly when, where, or by whom. Letters in which Tomislav was called king were preserved in a version of Thomas the Archdeacon's 13th-century History of Salona. A note preceding the proceedings of the 925 Council of Split calls Tomislav king "in the province of the Croats and in the Dalmatian regions" (in prouintia Croatorum et Dalmatiarum finibus Tamisclao rege). In the council's 12th canon, the ruler of the Croats is called "king" (rex et proceres Croatorum); in a letter from Pope John X, Tomislav is called "King of the Croats" (filio Tamisclao, regi Crouatorum). Although no inscriptions of Tomislav exist to confirm the title, later inscriptions and charters confirm that his 10th-century successors called themselves "kings".

Older historiography assumed that Tomislav was crowned in a field at Duvno (near Tomislavgrad), although there are no contemporary records of this event. This conclusion was drawn from the Chronicle of the Priest of Duklja, which describes a coronation of a King Svatopluk (Budimir in a later version of the chronicle) and a council held in a field at Dalma. Some 19th-century historians theorized that Tomislav and Svatopluk were the same person, or the author was mistaken about the king's name. Nonetheless, it did not take place. Other theories suggested that the pope (or a representative) had Tomislav crowned before the 925 Council of Split, or Tomislav crowned himself.

=== Councils of Split ===
In 925, Pope John X convened a church council in Split to decide which bishops in the former Roman province of Dalmatia would have ecclesiastical jurisdiction. The jurisdiction was contested by Gregory (the Croatian bishop of Nin) and John, the archbishop of Split. Before the council, Bishop Gregory was responsible for a significantly larger territory than Archbishop John; however, his reputation and finances could not compete with that of the Archbishopric of Split. Split also claimed continuity with the ancient Archbishopric of Salona and, due to this tradition, the council confirmed Split as the archepiscopal see. The territory from the river Raša in Istria to Kotor, including Nin, was subject to Split. The use of the Croatian language and Glagolitic script in ecclesiastical services was also discussed. The Pope sought to condemn it but the council allowed its use for local priests and monks, who were prevented from advancing to higher positions.

Thomas the Archdeacon did not mention the council in his Historia Salonitana. He wrote that Split had had ecclesiastical rights over former Roman Dalmatia since the 7th century (contradicting the council proceedings which bestowed the rights to Split in 925), apparently to maintain his narrative's consistency.

The council was attended by Tomislav (referred to as a king in related documents) and Michael of Zahumlje. According to some historians, Michael recognized Tomislav's rule (making Zachlumia a vassal state of Croatia). Tomislav did not protest the council's decision. Bishop Gregory appealed to the pope, and a second council (also in Split) was convened in 928 to resolve the controversy and enforce the first council's conclusions. The supremacy of the metropolitan archbishopric of Split was confirmed, and the Diocese of Nin was abolished.

=== War with Bulgaria ===
During Tomislav's rule, the Bulgarian and Byzantine Empires were at war. The Bulgarians under Emperor Simeon I destroyed the Principality of Serbia (a Byzantine ally) in 924, forcing Serbian Prince Zaharija and part of the Serbian population to flee to Croatia. Croatia (also a Byzantine ally) was now located between Bulgaria and the weakly defended Byzantine Theme of Dalmatia. Tomislav may have received some control of the Theme of Dalmatia's coastal cities or a share of collected taxes for his assistance to the Byzantine Empire. Although Byzantium gave Tomislav the honorary title of proconsul, there is no evidence that it recognized the loss of its rights in the Theme of Dalmatia to Tomislav.

Since Croatia was harboring Bulgarian enemies and was allied with the Byzantine Empire, Simeon attacked with an army led by Duke Alogobotur. Tomislav cut off Alogobotur's advance into Croatia and destroyed his army at the Croatian–Bulgarian battle of 926, which probably took place in eastern part Bosnia. After Simeon's death in 927, Pope John X sent legates with Bishop Madalbert to mediate between Croatia and Bulgaria and restored peace. It is unknown how Tomislav died, but he disappeared from the political scene after 928 and was succeeded by Trpimir II.

=== Geographic extent ===
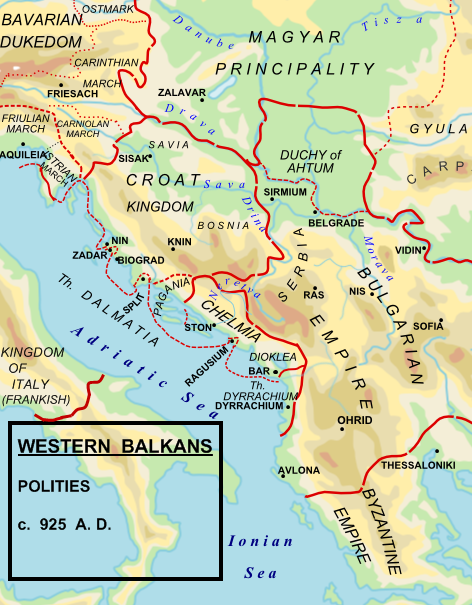
The greatest suggested geographic extent of the Kingdom of Croatia c. 925, during Tomislav's reign

The geographic extent of Tomislav's kingdom is not fully known. John the Deacon, whose chronicle is a primary source of the history of the 9th-and 10th-century Slavic peoples in Dalmatia, wrote that in 912 a Venetian ambassador returning from Bulgaria passed through Croatian territory before reaching the land of Zahumlje under Duke Michael; this suggests that Tomislav's Croatia bordered Bulgaria, then under the rule of Simeon I. British writer Marcus Tanner suggested that it covered most of modern Croatia, Bosnia and Herzegovina, and the coastline of Montenegro. According to Roger Lampe, the state did not extend as far south as Dubrovnik and Istria was not included. Many Croatian scholars said that the kingdom covered the region south of the Drava river, to the Drina and Neretva rivers north of Dubrovnik. Croatian historian Nada Klaić disputed the eastward (Bosnian) extension of Tomislav's kingdom in her 1972 book.

Josip Lučić and Franjo Šanjek's 1993 Hrvatski povijesni zemljovid (Croatian Historical Map) depicted the extent of Tomislav's kingdom. Lučić, an historical geographer at the Faculty of Philosophy in Zagreb, authored a number of maps in Croatian history books. In his 1995 book, Hrvatski rani srednji vijek, Ivo Goldstein wrote that Tomislav did not expand deep into inner Bosnia and incorporated only parts of Pannonia (not the region between the Drava and Sava, which Goldstein said was terra nullius. Neven Budak agreed with Goldstein about the Drava-Sava region, saying that the northern Croatian border probably passed through the Sisak area. Modern university history textbooks in Croatia, such as Tomislav Raukar's Hrvatsko srednjovjekovlje (1997), say that Tomislav's kingdom covered 60 to 80 percent of present-day Bosnia and Herzegovina. Franjo Šanjek edited a 16-author work on the medieval Croatian state which is also used as a university textbook and includes this view.

According to John Van Antwerp Fine Tomislav's northern border was the Drava River. South of it, the king held "modern Croatia, Slavonia, northern and western Bosnia, and the territory along the Dalmatian coast from what is now Rijeka to at least the mouth of the Cetina River (excluding the scattered Byzantine towns)". Fine criticized the relationship between Tomislav's territory and modern Croatian nationalist sentiment in his 2006 book, calling 10th-century sources unreliable and "roughly a third" of Croatia's perceived eastern land "entirely speculation". Fine wrote, "It is possible that Croatia really did have some of it, but Bulgaria may have had some of it; early Serb entities may have had some of it, not to speak of various župans and other local Slavic lords who in any serious way answered to no one. If the last supposition is true (to any degree), then parts of this territory would not have been held by any 'state.'" Acknowledging the possibility that Croatia held all the depicted territory and more, Fine said that whoever controlled the eastern land depicted in Tomislav's kingdom is unknown and should be marked as terra incognita on maps. He criticised Lučić and Šanjek's delineation of Tomislav's eastern border as "nationalist map-making" and "distorting the perceptions of children on their nation's history in a way that promotes interpreting later events as territorial loss and fragmentation."

== Legacy ==
Tomislav is celebrated as the first Croatian king and the founder of the first Croatian state. In Zagreb, the Croatian capital, a square named Tomislav was dedicated in November 1927; a monument by sculptor Robert Frangeš-Mihanović was erected that year. The Bosnian city of Duvno was renamed Tomislavgrad in 1925 by King Alexander I of Yugoslavia to commemorate the millennial of Tomislav's coronation, and celebrations were held throughout the Kingdom of Yugoslavia. In 1926, an obelisk in his honor was erected in Livno.

On May 18, 1941, the House of Savoy's Prince Aimone, Duke of Aosta was proclaimed King Tomislav II of the Independent State of Croatia to gain legitimacy for the Axis puppet state. Tomislav's statue in Zagreb was depicted on the reverse of the Croatian 1000 kn banknote issued in 1994, and his name is used for a dark beer brewed in Croatia.

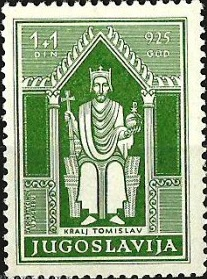
Stamp issued by Kingdom of Yugoslavia postal service (1940)

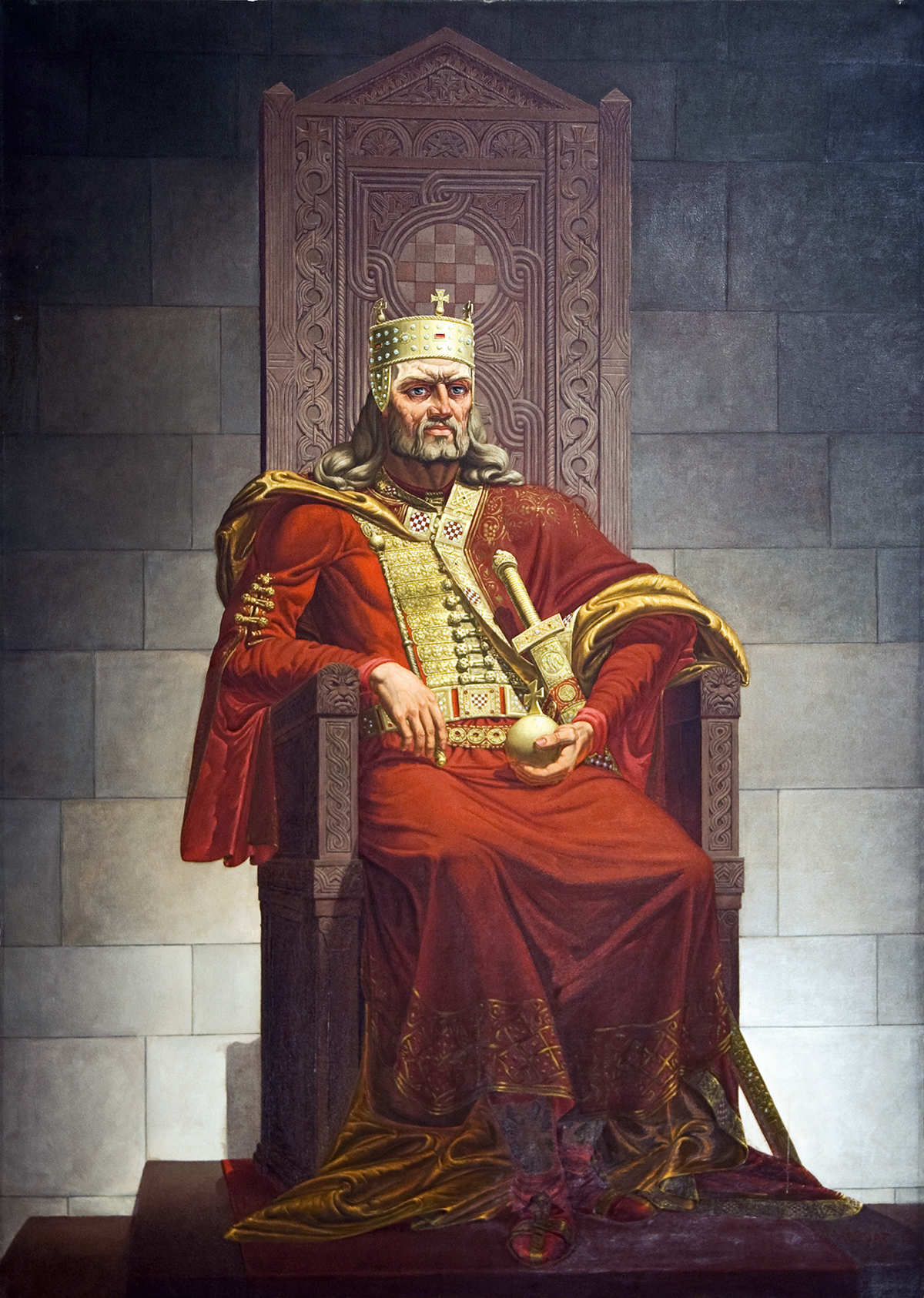
Painting by Josip Horvat Međimurec (1941)

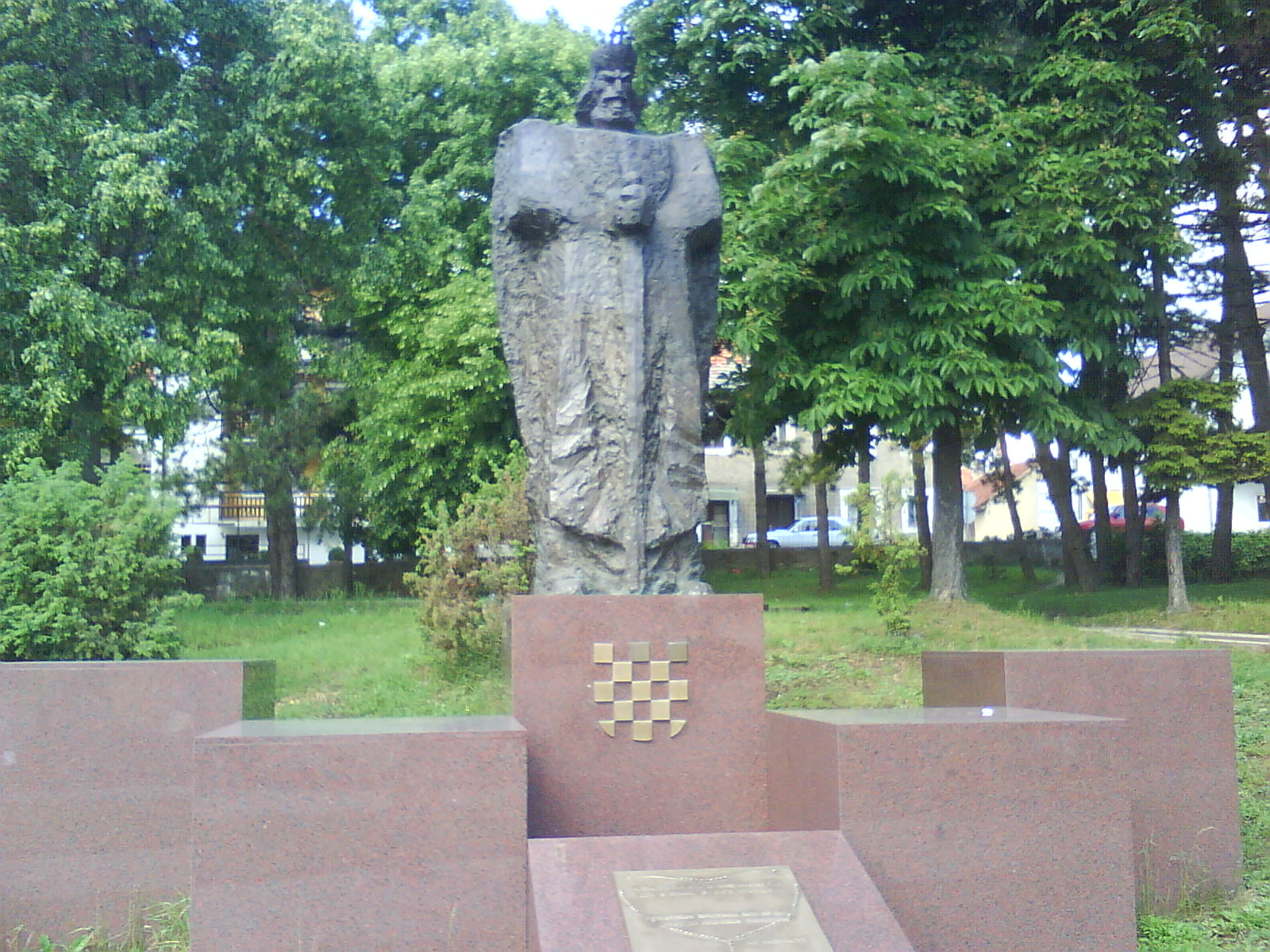
Monument in Tomislavgrad

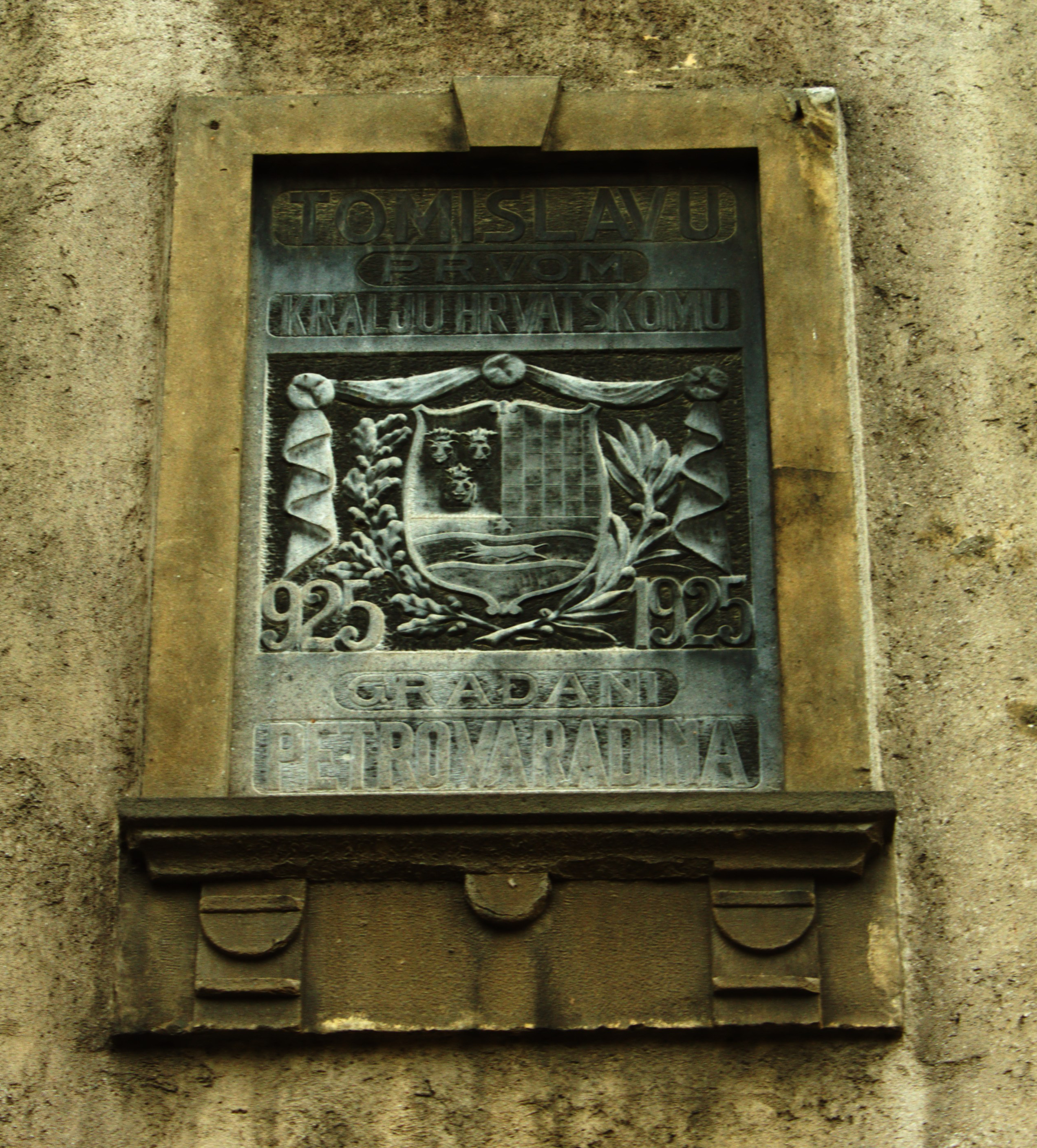
Plaque in Petrovaradin

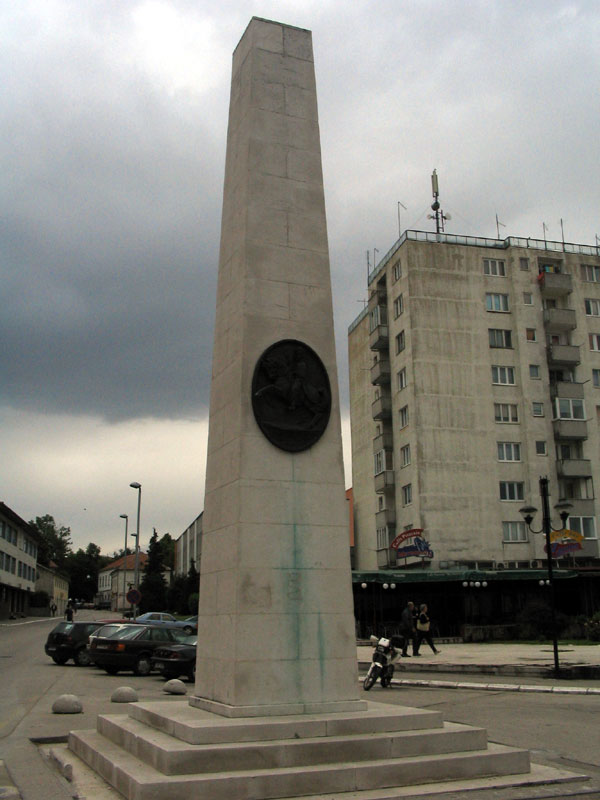
Monument in Livno

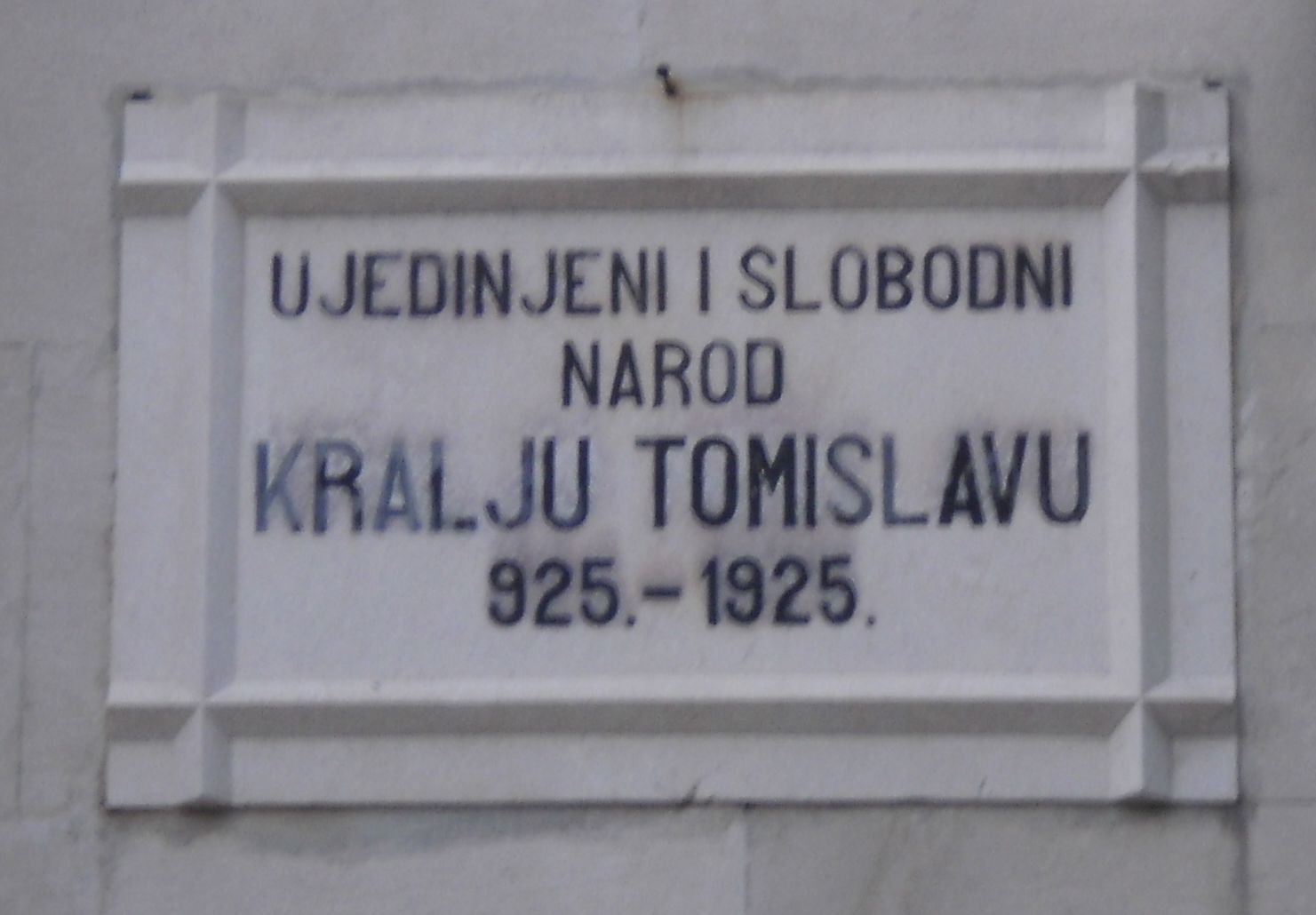
Commemorative plaque in Orebić

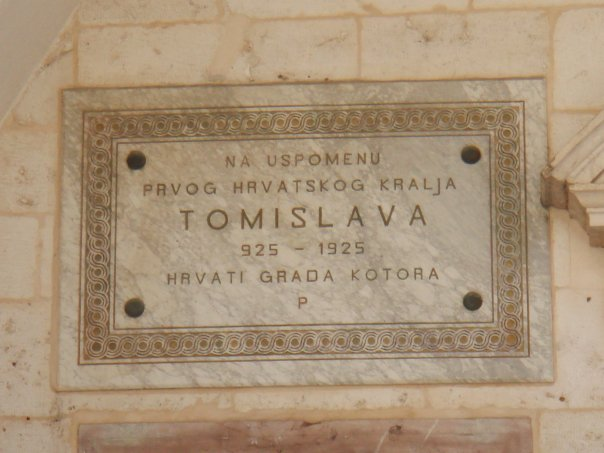
Memorial plaque in Kotor

== See also ==
- History of Croatia
- Croatian–Bulgarian wars
- Grand Order of King Tomislav

== Sources ==
- Budak, Neven (1994). Prva stoljeća Hrvatske (PDF) (in Croatian). Zagreb: Hrvatska sveučilišna naklada. ISBN 953-169-032-4. Archived from the original (PDF) on 15 March 2017.
- Fine, John Van Antwerp (1991). The Early Medieval Balkans: A Critical Survey from the Sixth to the Late Twelfth Century. University of Michigan Press. ISBN 0472081497.
- Fine, John Van Antwerp (2006). When Ethnicity Did Not Matter in the Balkans: A Study of Identity in Pre-Nationalist Croatia, Dalmatia, and Slavonia in the Medieval and Early-Modern Periods. University of Michigan Press. ISBN 0-472-11414-X.
- Goldstein, Ivo (May 1985). "O Tomislavu i njegovom dobu" (PDF). Journal of the Institute of Croatian History (in Croatian). 18 (1): 23–55.
- Goldstein, Ivo (1995). Hrvatski rani srednji vijek (in Croatian). Zagreb: Novi Liber. ISBN 978-953-6045-02-0.

Tomislav, King of Croatia House of Trpimirović
Regnal titles
Preceded by Muncimir	Duke of Croatia c. 910 – 925	Title abolished
New title	King of Croatia c. 925 – 928	Succeeded by Trpimir II
