= Archdiocese of Crotone-Santa Severina =

Latin Catholic archdiocese in Italy

Coordinates: 39.0833°N 17.1167°E

Archdiocese of Crotone-Santa Severina Archidioecesis Crotonensis-Sanctae Severinae

Catholic
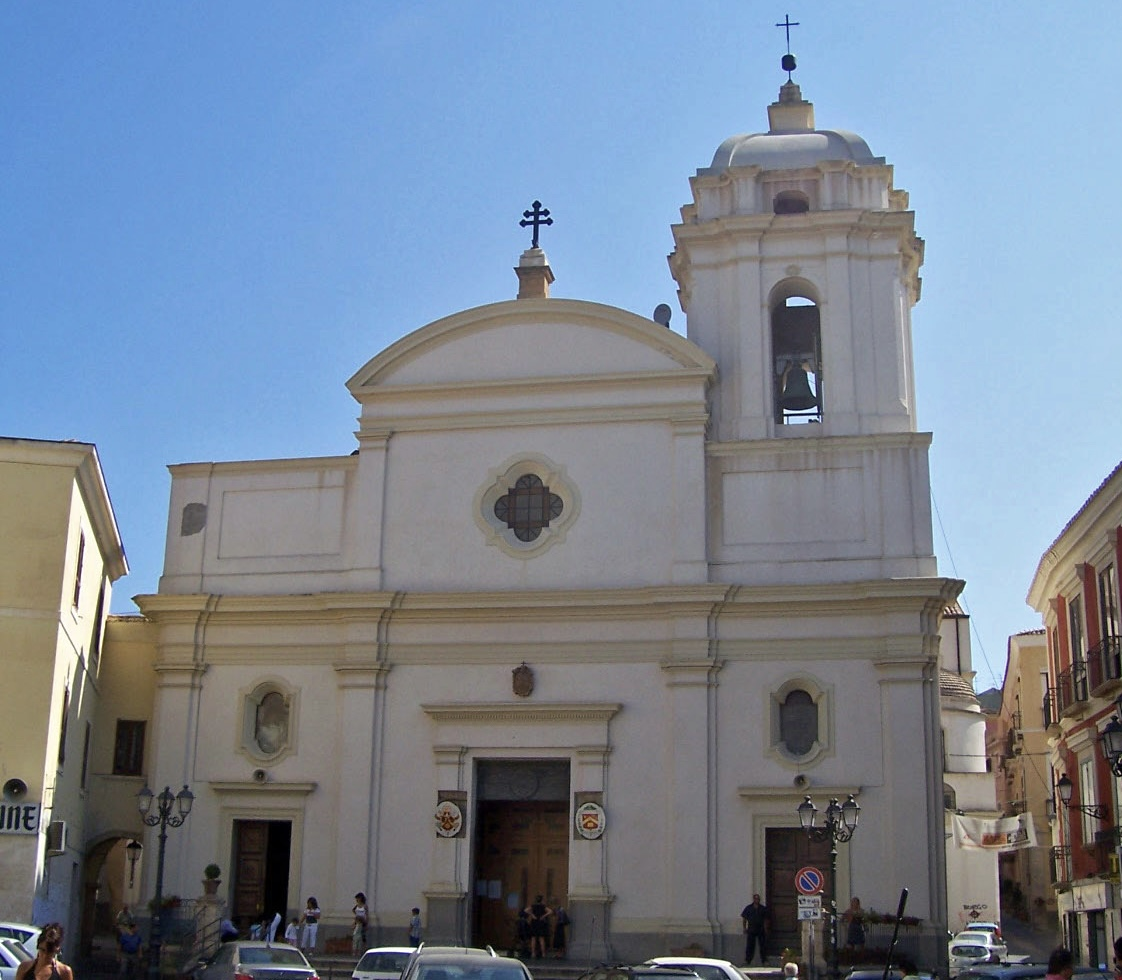
- Cathedral of Crotone

Location
- Country: Italy
- Ecclesiastical province: Catanzaro-Squillace

Statistics
- Area: 1,885 km^{2} (728 sq mi)
- Population: Total; Catholics: (as of 2023); 202,187 ▼; 189,253 ▲ (93.6%)
- Parishes: 84

Information
- Denomination: Catholic Church
- Sui iuris church: Latin Church
- Rite: Roman Rite
- Established: 6th Century
- Cathedral: Basilica Cattedrale di Santa Maria Assunta (Crotone)
- Co-cathedral: Concattedrale di Santa Anastasia (Santa Severina)
- Secular priests: 100 (diocesan); 7 (Religious Orders) ▼14 Permanent Deacons

Current leadership
- Pope: Leo XIV
- Archbishop: Alberto Torriani

Map

Website
- http://www.diocesidicrotonesantaseverina.it/DIOCESI/

The Archdiocese of Crotone-Santa Severina (Latin: Archidioecesis Crotonensis-Sanctae Severinae) is a Latin Church archdiocese of the Catholic Church in Calabria in southern Italy. Its modern boundaries were established in 1986 when it was combined with the Diocese of Santa Severina. It is now a suffragan of the Archdiocese of Catanzaro-Squillace. In 2013 there was one priest for every 1,841 Catholics.

The original Diocese of Cortone (also Cotrone, now Crotone) had existed from the 6th century. It was a suffragan of the Archdiocese of Reggio.

== History ==
According to local legend the Gospel was preached there by Peter the Apostle, or by Dionysius the Areopagite, a follower of Paul of Tarsus, and it is claimed that Dionysius was the first bishop.

Cotrone (ancient Croton) was besieged by Totila, King of the Goths, in the 540s, without success. At a later date Croton became a part of the Byzantine Empire. About 870 it was taken and sacked by the Saracens, who put to death the bishop and many people who had taken refuge in the cathedral. Later on it was conquered by Normans, and thenceforth shared the fate of the Kingdom of Naples.

The first known bishop of Cotrone, according to local tradition, was Flavianus, during whose episcopate occurred the siege of the city by Totila, according to Fernando Ughelli. There is no documentary evidence of his existence.

=== Cathedral and Chapter ===
The cathedral of Crotone was dedicated to the Assumption of Mary, and to Dionysius the Areopagite.

The cathedral was administered and staffed by a corporation called the Chapter, which was composed of four dignities (Archdeacon, Dean, Cantor and Archpriest) and sixteen canons. In 1690, and again in 1793, there were six dignities and eighteen canons.

The diocesan seminary was established by Bishop Girolamo Carafa (1664–1683).

=== Diocesan synods ===
A diocesan synod was an irregularly held, but important, meeting of the bishop of a diocese and his clergy. Its purpose was:

1. to proclaim generally the various decrees already issued by the bishop;
2. to discuss and ratify measures on which the bishop chose to consult with his clergy;
3. to publish statutes and decrees of the diocesan synod, of the provincial synod, and of the Holy See.

Bishop Marco de Rama (1690–1709) presided over a diocesan synod in Crotone on 9 July 1693.

A diocesan synod was held by Bishop Gaetano Costa (1723–1753) in the cathedral of Crotone on 5–7 June 1729. Bishop Giuseppe Capocchiani (1774–1788) held a diocesan synod in the cathedral of Cortone on 18 December 1785. On 20 December 1795, Bishop Ludovico Ludovici (1792–1797) held a diocesan synod, whose decrees were published in Naples in 1796.

Bishop Leonardo Todisco Grande (1834–1849) began a general visitation of the institutions of his diocese in 1842, and then presided over a diocesan synod which was held at Crotone on 1–3 June 1845; its constitutions and decrees were published.

=== Reorganization of 1818 ===
Following the extinction of the Napoleonic Kingdom of Italy, the Congress of Vienna authorized the restoration of the Papal States and the Kingdom of Naples. Since the French occupation had seen the abolition of many Church institutions in the kingdom, as well as the confiscation of most Church property and resources, it was imperative that Pope Pius VII and King Ferdinand IV reach agreement on restoration and restitution. Ferdinand, however, was not prepared to accept the pre-Napoleonic situation, in which Naples was a feudal subject of the papacy. Lengthy, detailed, and acrimonious negotiations ensued.

In 1818, a new concordat with the Kingdom of the Two Sicilies committed the pope to the suppression of more than fifty small dioceses in the kingdom. In the ecclesiastical province of Reggio, to which the diocese of Cotrone belonged, Pope Pius VII, in the bull De Utiliori of 27 June 1818, chose to suppress the diocese of Isola completely, and assigned its people and territory to the diocese of Cotrone. In the same concordat, the King was confirmed in the right to nominate candidates for vacant bishoprics, subject to the approval of the pope. That situation persisted down until the final overthrow of the Bourbon monarchy in 1860.

=== Temporary union of three dioceses under one bishop ===
Changing patterns of settlement and distribution of wealth following World War II had an impact on dioceses which were mostly rural in character. In 1970, the entire diocese of Santa Severina had a Catholic population estimated at 62,000, and was served by 44 priests (1:2000). The diocese of Cariati had some 72,000 Catholics, and 37 priests (1:1945). The diocese of Crotone had an estimated 61,000 Catholics and 37 priests (1:1648). Bishop Orazio Semeraro of Cariata had been transferred to Brindisi in April 1967; Bishop Raimondi of Crotone had died in June 1971. Archbishop Michele Federici of Santa Severina was transferred to Veroli-Frosinone on 23 December 1973, which cleared the way to a reorganization of diocesan resources in Calabria. On 21 December 1973, Pope Paul VI appointed Giuseppe Agostino, who had been the Vicar General of the diocese of Reggio Calabria, Archbishop of Santa Severina and at the same time Bishop of Crotone and Bishop of Cariati, aeque pariter. Cariati was united to the archdiocese of Rossano in 1979, and Santa Severina was united to the archdiocese of Crotone in 1986.

=== Union of Santa Severina with Crotone ===
On 18 February 1984, the Vatican and the Italian State signed a new and revised concordat. Based on the revisions, a set of Normae was issued on 15 November 1984, which was accompanied in the next year, on 3 June 1985, by enabling legislation. According to the agreement, the practice of having one bishop govern two separate dioceses at the same time, aeque personaliter, was abolished. Instead, the Vatican continued consultations which had begun under Pope John XXIII for the merging of small dioceses, especially those with personnel and financial problems, into one combined diocese. On 30 September 1986, Pope John Paul II ordered that the dioceses of Crotone and Santa Severina be merged into one diocese with one bishop, with the Latin title Archidioecesis Crotonensis-Sanctae Severinae. The diocese was to be subject to the metropolitan of Reggio-Bova. The seat of the diocese was to be in Crotone, and the cathedral of Crotone was to serve as the cathedral of the merged diocese. The cathedral in Santa Severina was to become a co-cathedral, and the cathedral Chapter was to be a Capitulum Concathedralis. There was to be only one diocesan tribunal, in Crotone, and likewise one seminary, one College of Consultors, and one Priests' Council. The territory of the new diocese was to include the territory of the former dioceses of Crotone and Santa Severina.

=== Change of metropolitan ===
Following the Second Vatican Council, and in accordance with the norms laid out in the Council's decree, Christus Dominus chapter 40, major changes were made in the ecclesiastical administrative structure of southern Italy. The provinces of Calabria were addressed by Pope John Paul II in the bull Maiori Christifidelium of 30 January 2001. The dioceses of Cosentina-Bisignano and Catanzaro-Squillace were raised to metropolitan status. Catanzaro-Squillace was assigned the dioceses of Nicastro and Crotone-Santa Severina, which had been suffragan dioceses of the metropolitanate of Reggio-Bova, as its suffragans.

== Bishops of Crotone ==
=== to 1400 ===
[Flavianus]
...

- Jordanes (attested 551)

...
Sede vacante (592)
...

- Theodosios (642)
- Petrus (680)
- Theotimus (790)
- Nicephorus (870)

...

- Anastasius (attested 1121)

...

- Philippus (1159–1179)

...

- Joannes (attested 1217, 1219; resigned 1220)

...

- Romualdus (c. 1235–1240)

...
[Maurus (1254)]

- Nicolaus de Durachio (Durazzo) (1254–1266/1267)

Sede vacante (1267–1273)

- Fredericus (attested 1274–1280)

...

- Guilelmus (1346–1348)
- Nicolaus Malopera (1348–1357)
- Bernardus de Agrevolo (1358–1365)
- Joannes de S. Nicolao, O.Min. (1365–1372?)
- Rainaldus (1372–1402)

=== 1400 to 1700 ===
- Antonius (1402–1410?)
- Laurentius (1410– )
- Jordanus de Lovello (1427–1439)
- Galeotto Quattromani (1440–1444)
- Cruchetus, O.Min. (1444–1457)
- Guglielmo de Franciscis (1457–1462)
- Giovanni Campano (1462–1463)
- Martinus (1464–1465)
- Antonio Caffaro (1465– ? )
- Bernardo de Ruggieri (1473–1480)
- Giovanni da Viterbo (1481–1496)
- Andrea della Valle (2 Dec 1496 –1508)
- Antonio Lucifero (15 Mar 1508 – 1521 Died)
- Cardinal Andrea della Valle (4 Sep 1522 – 14 Nov 1524 Resigned)
- Giovanni Matteo Lucifero (14 Nov 1524 – 1551)
- Pietro Paolo Caporelli, O.F.M. (28 Sep 1552 – 1556)
- Juan Francisco de Aguirre (1557–1564)
- Antonio Sebastiani Minturno (13 Jul 1565 – 1574 Died)
- Cristóbal Berrocal (11 Aug 1574 – 1578 Died)
- Marcello Maiorana, C.R. (1578–1581)
- Giuseppe Faraoni (1581–1588)
- Mario Bolognini (1588–1591)
- Claudio de' Corti (1591–1595)
- Juan López, O.P. (1595 –1598)
- Tommaso delli Monti, C.R. (1599 –1608)
- Carlo Catalani (24 Nov 1610 – 1623)
- Diego Cabeza de Vaca (20 Nov 1623 – Dec 1625)
- Niceforo Melisseno Comneno (1628–1635)

Sede vacante (1635–1638)

- Juan Pastor, O.M. (30 Aug 1638 – 1664)
- Girolamo Carafa, C.R. (31 Mar 1664 – Oct 1683)
- Marco de Rama, O.S.A. (22 May 1690 Confirmed – 4 Aug 1709 Died)

=== 1700 to 1986 ===
- Michele Guardia (1715–1718)
- Anselmo de la Peña, O.S.B. (1719–1723)
- Gaetano Costa, O.F.M. (1723–1753)
- Domenico Zicari (23 Jul 1753 Confirmed –1757)
- Mariano Amato (28 Mar 1757 Confirmed – Dec 1765)
- Bartholomaeus Amoroso (2 Jun 1766 Confirmed – Dec 1771)
- Giuseppe Capocchiani (18 Apr 1774 Confirmed – 15 Oct 1788)
- Ludovico Ludovici, O.F.M. Obs. (1792–1797)
- Rocco Coiro (18 Dec 1797 Confirmed – Mar 1812 Died)
- Domenico Fendale (25 May 1818 Confirmed – 6 Mar 1828 Died)
- Zaccaria Boccardo, O.F.M. Cap. (1829–1833)
- Leonardo Todisco Grande (1834–1849)
- Gabriele Ventriglia (20 Apr 1849 Confirmed – 15 Mar 1852 Appointed, Bishop of Caiazzo)
- Luigi Sodo (18 Mar 1852 – 27 Jun 1853 Confirmed, Bishop of Telese o Cerreto Sannita)
- Luigi Laterza (27 Jun 1853 Confirmed – 11 Feb 1860 Died)
- Luigi Maria (Honuphrius Maria) Lembo, O.F.M. (1860–1883)
- Giuseppe Cavaliere (24 Jun 1883 Succeeded – Aug 1899 Died)
- Emanuele Merra (14 Dec 1899 – 27 Mar 1905 Appointed, Bishop of San Severo)
- Saturnino Peri (30 Jun 1909 – 16 Dec 1920 Appointed, Bishop of Iglesias)
- Carmelo Pujia (13 Feb 1925 – 11 Feb 1927 Appointed, Archbishop of Reggio Calabria)
- Antonio Galati (2 Jun 1928 – 2 Mar 1946 Died)
- Pietro Raimondi (8 May 1946 – 21 Jun 1971 Retired)
- Giuseppe Agostino (21 Dec 1973 – 30 Sep 1986) Appointed Archbishop of Santa Severina and Bishop of Crotone

=== Archdiocese of Crotone-Santa Severina ===
- Andrea Mugione (21 Nov 1998 – 2006)
- Domenico Graziani (21 Nov 2006 – 8 Nov 2019)
- Angelo Raffaele Panzetta (8 Nov 2019 – 28 Aug 2024), appointed Coadjutor of Lecce
- Alberto Torriani (11 Dec 2024 – present)

== Books ==
=== Reference works ===
- Gams, Pius Bonifatius (1873). Series episcoporum Ecclesiae catholicae: quotquot innotuerunt a beato Petro apostolo. Ratisbon: Typis et Sumptibus Georgii Josephi Manz. pp. 879–880. (Use with caution; obsolete)
- Eubel, Conradus, ed. (1913). Hierarchia catholica (in Latin). Vol. Tomus 1 (second ed.). Münster: Libreria Regensbergiana.
- Eubel, Conradus, ed. (1914). Hierarchia catholica (in Latin). Vol. Tomus 2 (second ed.). Münster: Libreria Regensbergiana.
- Gulik, Guilelmus (1923). Eubel, Conradus (ed.). Hierarchia catholica (in Latin). Vol. Tomus 3 (second ed.). Münster: Libreria Regensbergiana.
- Gauchat, Patritius (Patrice) (1935). Hierarchia catholica (in Latin). Vol. Tomus IV (1592-1667). Münster: Libraria Regensbergiana.
- Ritzler, Remigius; Sefrin, Pirminus (1952). Hierarchia catholica medii et recentis aevi (in Latin). Vol. Tomus V (1667-1730). Patavii: Messagero di S. Antonio.
- Ritzler, Remigius; Sefrin, Pirminus (1958). Hierarchia catholica medii et recentis aevi. Vol. Tomus VI (1730-1799). Patavii: Messagero di S. Antonio.
- Ritzler, Remigius; Sefrin, Pirminus (1968). Hierarchia Catholica medii et recentioris aevi (in Latin). Vol. VII (1800–1846). Monasterii: Libreria Regensburgiana.
- Remigius Ritzler; Pirminus Sefrin (1978). Hierarchia catholica Medii et recentioris aevi (in Latin). Vol. VIII (1846–1903). Il Messaggero di S. Antonio.
- Pięta, Zenon (2002). Hierarchia catholica medii et recentioris aevi (in Latin). Vol. IX (1903–1922). Padua: Messagero di San Antonio. ISBN 978-88-250-1000-8.

=== Studies ===
- Cappelletti, Giuseppe (1870). Le chiese d'Italia dalla loro origine sino ai nostri giorni (in Italian). Vol. Tomo vigesimo primo (21). Venezia: G. Antonelli. pp. 187–194.
- D'Avino, Vincenzo (1848). Cenni storici sulle chiese arcivescovili, vescovili, e prelatizie (nullius) del regno delle due Sicilie (in Italian). Naples: dalle stampe di Ranucci.
- Falcone, Niccolò Carminio (1846). Biblioteca storica topografica delle Calabrie (in Italian) (seconda ed.). Napoli: tipografia del Poliorama Pittoresco.
- Kamp, Norbert (1975). Kirche und Monarchie im staufischen Königreich Sizilien: I. Prosopographische Grundlegung, Bistumer und Bistümer und Bischöfe des Konigreichs 1194–1266: 2. Apulien und Calabrien München: Wilhelm Fink 1975. (in German)
- Kehr, Paulus Fridolin (1975). Italia pontificia. Regesta pontificum Romanorum. Vol. X: Calabria–Insulae. Berlin: Weidmann. pp. 85–86; 124-127. (in Latin)
- Lanzoni, Francesco (1927). Le diocesi d'Italia dalle origini al principio del secolo VII (an. 604). Faenza: F. Lega, pp. 381–389. (in Italian)
- Severino, Carmelo G. (2011). Crotone. Da polis a città di Calabria (in Italian). Roma: Gangemi Editore. ISBN 978-88-492-7254-3.
- Taccone-Gallucci, Domenico (1902). Regesti dei Romani pontefici della Calabria (in Italian). Roma: Tip. Vaticana. pp. 408–410.
- Valente, G. (1949). Diocesi e vescovi di Crotone. Crotone, 1949. (in Italian)
