= Diocese of Nin =

The Diocese of Nin (historically, Nona) was a Catholic jurisdiction probably founded in the middle of the 9th century. The seat of its bishops was the Church of the Holy Cross in Nin, Croatia.

== List ==
| Bishop | Office | Notes |
|---|---|---|
| Theodosius | 879-886 | Listed by Daniele Farlati, Pius Basilius Gams, Carlo F. Bianchi, Ivan A. Gurato and the official Catholic schematisms. |
| Alfredus | c. 890 | |
| Gregorius | c. 900–929 | Gregorius was the bishop of Nin and as such was under strong protection of King Tomislav. At the Synod in 925, held in Split, Croatia, Gregory lost to the Archbishop of Split, he was offered the Sisak Bishopric, but he refused. After the conclusions of the first Synod, Gregory complained again in 928 but was rejected and his Nin bishopric was abolished, Gregory himself being sent off to the Skradin bishopric, after which he disappears from the annals of history. |
Abolished
| Andreas | c. 1050–1072 | |
| Forminus | fl. 1075 | |
| Gregorius | fl. 1104 | |
| Rodanus | fl. 1163 | |
| Matthaeus | 1170–1194 | |
| Ioannes | c. 1206 | |
| B. | 1229 | |
| S.Janson | 1230, 1241 | |
| Ioannes | 1253, 1258 | |
| Stephanus | 1272 | |
| Marcellus | 1288 | |
| Marcus | 1291 | |
| Ioannes | 1318? | |
| Natalis | 1328–1342 | |
| Ivan IV | 1342–1353 | |
| Dimitrije de Metapharis | 1354–1387 | |
| Antun Črnota | 1387 | |
| Ivan V | 1394–1400 | |
| Franjo Petri | 1402 | |
| Ivan VI | 1409 | |
| Nikola de Treviso | 1400–1424 | |
| Ludovik | 1436 | |
| Natalis Mlečanin | 1436–1462 | |
| Jakob Bragdeno | 1462–1474 | |
| Juraj Divnić | 1479–1530 | He was one of the more important Catholic bishops of Croatian origin in his time. He was born in Šibenik, and was part of the known Divnić family, which settled in Šibenik in the 14th century from Skradin, and had likely settled there from Bosnia earlier. Bishop Juraj wrote Pope Alexander VI about the catastrophe right after the Battle of Krbava. |
| Jakob Divnić | 1530–1554 | Nephew of Juraj Divnić, coadjutor bishop from 1523 |
| Marco Loredan | 1554–1577 | |
| Pietro Cedolini | 1577–1581 | |
| Gerolamo Mazzarelli | 1581–1588 | |
| Angelo Gradi | 1588–1592 | |
| Horatius Belloti Venetus O. M. Conv. | 1592–1602 | |
| Blasius Mandevius | 1602–1645 | |
| Simeone Difnico | 1646–1649 | |
| Georgius Georgiceo | 1649–1653 | |
| Franciscus Andronicus | 1653–1666 | |
| Franciscus Grassi | 1667–1677 | |
| Ioannes Burgofortis (Giovanni Borgoforte) | 1677–1687 | |
| Ioannes Vusius (Giovanni Vusich) | 1688–1689 | |
| Juraj Parčić | 1690–1703 | |
| Martinus Dragolius (Dragolovich) | 1703–1708 | |
| Ioannes Manola | 1709–1711 | |
| Antonius Rosignoli | 1713–1715 | |
| Nicolaus Drasich | 1716–1720 | |
| Bernardus Dominicus Leoni | 1722–1727 | |
| Ioannes Andreas Balbi | 1728–1732 | |
| Hieronvmus Fonda | 1733–1738 | |
| Ioannes Fridericus Orsini Rosa | 1738–1742 | |
| Thomas Nechich | 1743–1754 | |
| Antonius Tripcovich | 1754–1771 | |

== Bibliography ==
- Mile Vidović (1996). Povijest crkve u Hrvata (in Croatian). Crkva u svijetu. pp. -537-. ISBN 9789536151158.
- Hierarchia catholica medii aevi: A pontificatu Clementis PP. VIII (1592) usque ad pontificatum Alexandri PP. VII (1667).
- Hierarchia catholica medii aevi: 1667-1730.
- Zvjezdan Strika (December 2007). ""Catalogus episcoporum ecclesiae Nonensis" zadarskog kanonika Ivana A. Gurata" ["Catalogus episcoporum ecclesiae Nonensis" of the Zadar Canon Ivan A. Gurato]. Radovi / Institute for Historical Sciences of the Croatian Academy of Sciences and Arts in Zadar (in Croatian) (49).
- Fine, John Van Antwerp (1991). The Early Medieval Balkans: A Critical Survey from the Sixth to the Late Twelfth Century. Ann Arbor: University of Michigan Press. ISBN 978-0-472-08149-3.
