= Girolamo Carafa =

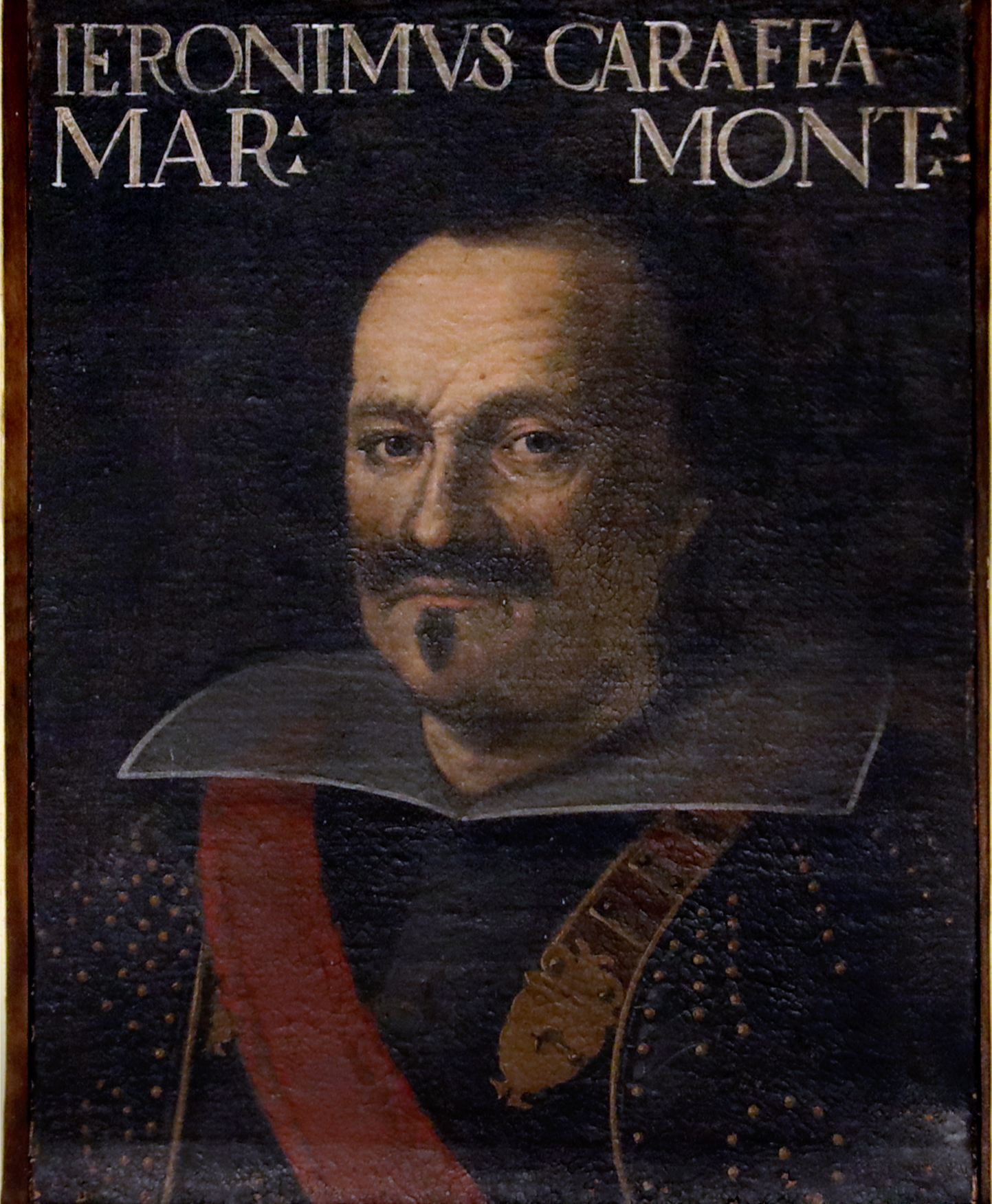
Girolamo Carafa

Girolamo Carafa (or Caraffa), Marquis of Montenegro (Abruzzo, 1564 – Genoa, 1633) was a general in Spanish and Imperial service from Italian descent.

== Life ==
Girolamo was born in the noble Neapolitan Carafa family. His parents were Rainaldo Carafa and Portia Carracciola, daughter of the Duke of Sicignano.

At the age of 14, he was sent to Rome to study science under guidance of his uncle Cardinal Antonio Carafa. Girolamo married young with Hippolyta de Lannoy, granddaughter of Charles de Lannoy, Spanish Viceroy of Naples.

In 1587, Girolamo joined the Spanish army, against the will of his family. First he served under Alexander Farnese in the Dutch Revolt. Then he fought against King Henry IV of France, more specifically at Ligne (1590) and Rouen (1592). Later he commanded an army unit in Friesland, Brabant and Flanders.

In the Franco-Spanish War (1595-1598) he first fought in some smaller battles in the border area. But in 1597, he participated in the Siege of Amiens, where he became leader of the besieged Spanish troops, when General Porto-Carrero was killed. He defended the city with great courage, and was honoured by King Henry IV of France, when he had to surrender the city on September 25.

After his return to the Low Countries, he fought in the Siege of Ostend. When Ostend was taken, he was sent to Italy to fight against Savoy. After peace was concluded, he became commander of the cavalry in Sicily. Here he was contacted by Ferdinand II, Holy Roman Emperor and entered in his service at the outbreak of the Thirty Years' War.

He played an important role in the victory at the Battle of White Mountain, when he prevented the union of the troops of Gábor Bethlen with his Bohemian allies. He also fought near Milan in 1621.

After the peace treaty with Gábor Bethlen was signed, Girolamo became Geheimrat and Reichsfürst. He returned to Spain where he became Viceroy of Aragon. Shortly after, he was sent one more time to the low Countries, but died underway.

Carafa was a strict Catholic and was highly educated.

== Sources ==
- ADB (in German)
- C. A. Schweigerd: Österreichs Helden und Heerführer. Band 1, Wurzen 1857, S. 644–647
