= Fernando de Valenzuela, 1st Marquis of Villasierra =

Spanish nobleman and royal adviser

Don Fernando de Valenzuela, 1st Marquis of Villasierra
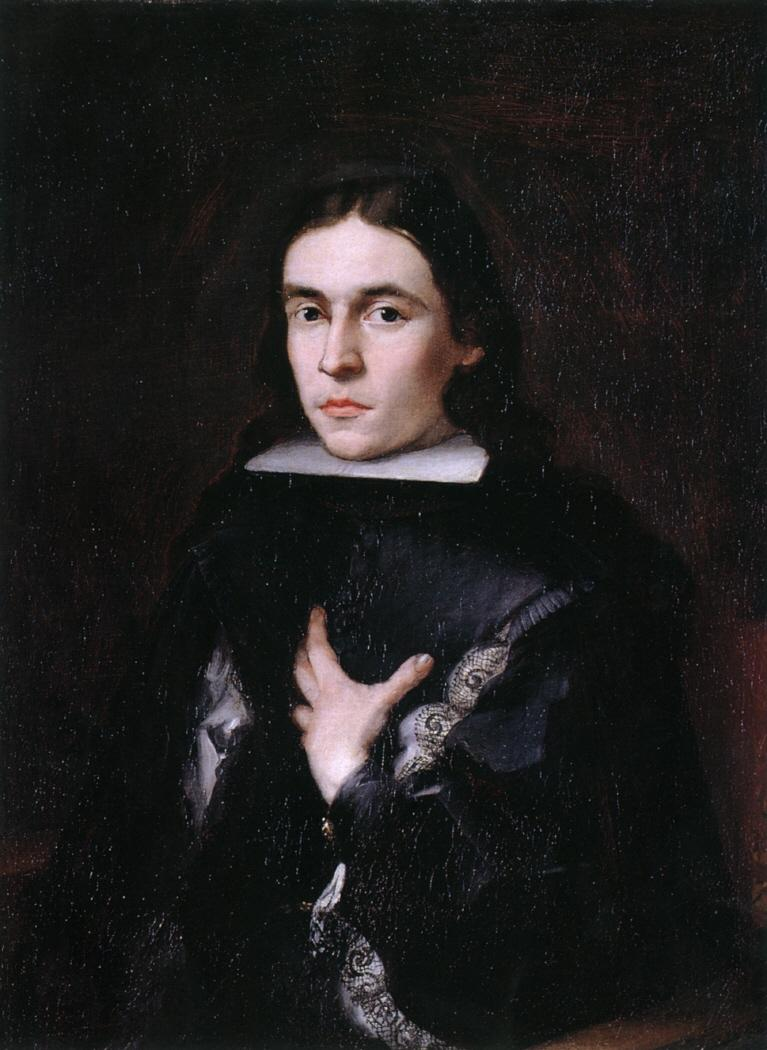
- Fernando de Valenzuela, 1st Marquis of Villasierra, ca 1660

Chief Minister
- In office November 1676 – January 1677
- Monarch: Charles II of Spain
- Preceded by: Juan Everardo Nithard
- Succeeded by: John of Austria the Younger

Captain-General of Granada
- In office May 1676 – October 1676

Personal details
- Born: 8 January 1636 Naples
- Died: 7 February 1692 (aged 56) Mexico City
- Spouse: Maria Ambrosia de Ucedo y Prado
- Children: Francisco de Valenzuela y Ucedo (1670-?)
- Parent(s): Francisco de Valenzuela; Leonora de Encisa
- Awards: Order of Santiago 1671

Fernando de Valenzuela, 1st Marquis of Villasierra, Grandee of Spain (in full, Spanish: Don Fernando de Valenzuela y Enciso, Núñez y Dávila, primer marqués de Villasierra, Grande de España, Virrey de Granada; 8 January 1636, Naples – 7 February 1692), served as a trusted advisor and valido to Mariana of Austria, Queen Regent of Spain.

Valenzuela came from the lower ranks of Spanish nobility or hidalgos and his appointment was resented by the grandees, the upper nobility who dominated government appointments. In 1677, he was removed from office and imprisoned in the Philippines; released in 1688, he settled in Mexico City, where he died in 1692.

== Life ==
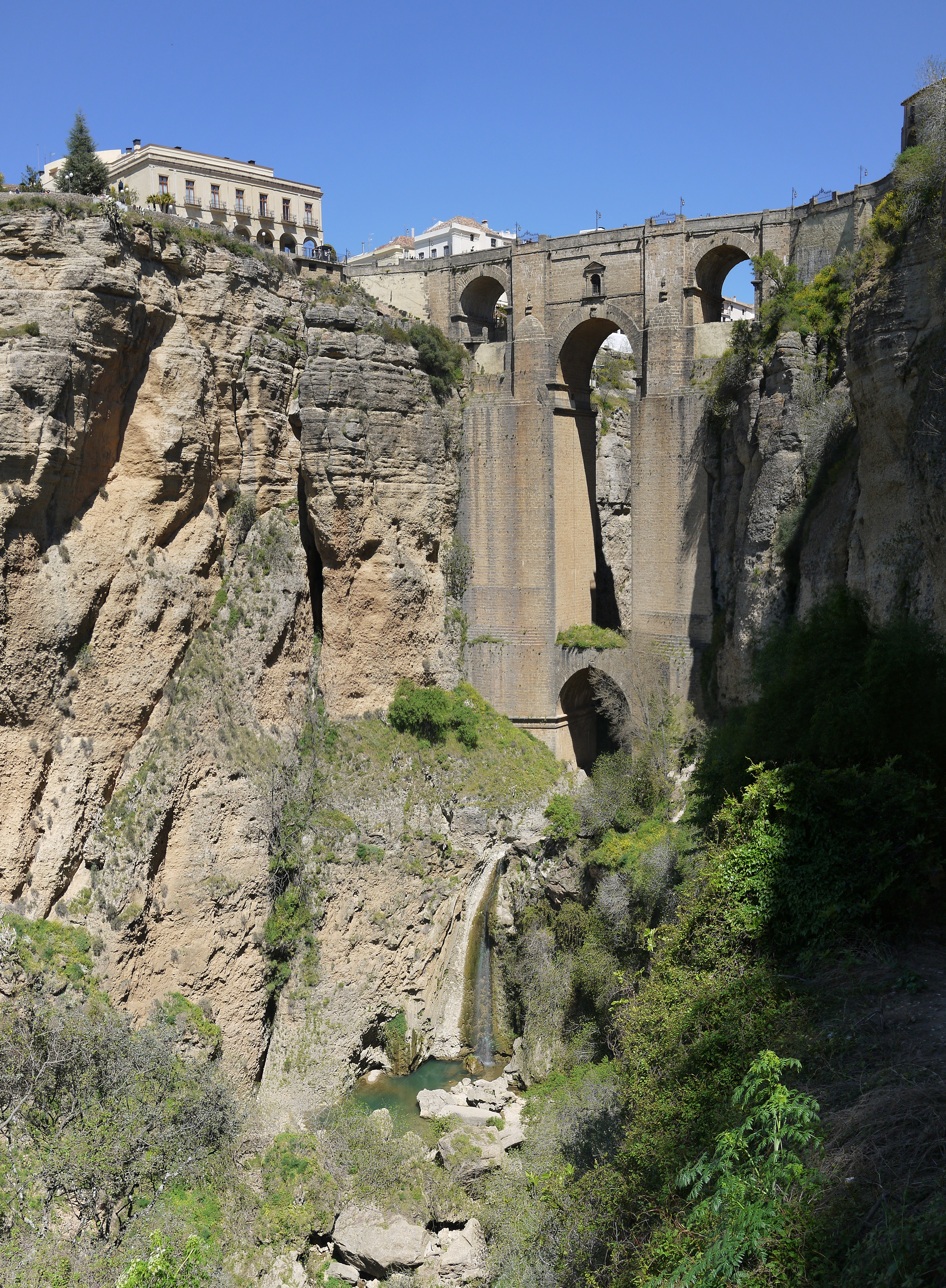
The entry to Ronda, where the Valenzuela family settled in 1485

Fernando de Valenzuela was born in Naples in 1636, only son of Francisco de Valenzuela and Leonora de Encisa y Davila. He was baptised in the church of Sant'Anna dei Lombardi on 17 January 1636.

Originally from Andalusia, in Southern Spain, the Valenzuela were middle-ranking nobility or hidalgos who served across the Spanish Empire as soldiers and administrators. During the Reconquista in 1485, his great-great grandfather, Fernando de Valenzuela Baena, took part in the capture of Ronda and was rewarded with lands and offices. They remained a prominent local family; his grandfather Gaspar Juan y de Escalante de Valenzuela was the two governor.

In 1661, Valenzuela married Maria Ambrosia de Ucedo y Prado; their son Francisco de Ucedo de la Valenzuela became a government officer in the Mexican provinces of Nueva Vizcaya and New Navarre.

== Career ==
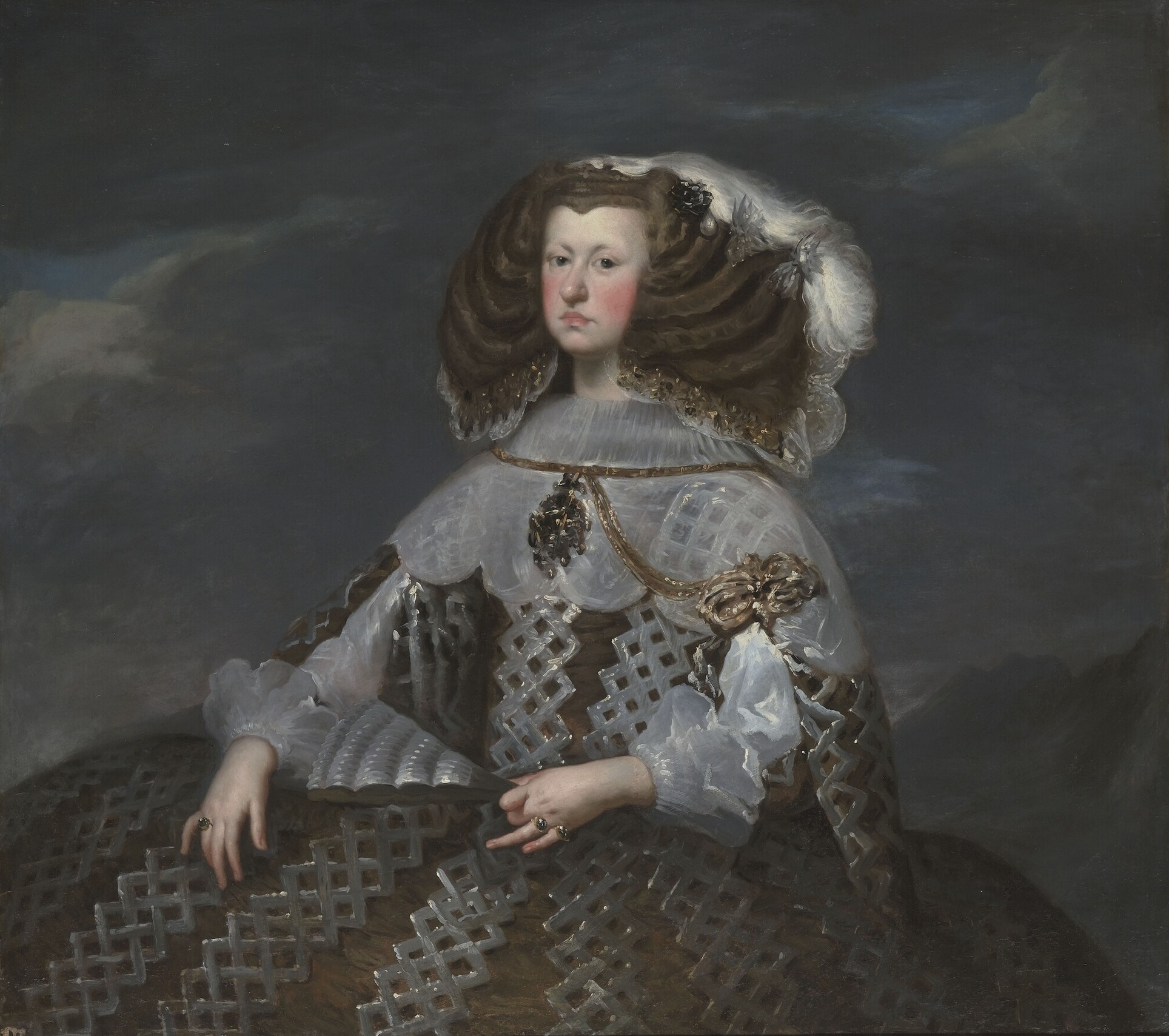
Mariana of Austria, Queen Regent; by Velázquez, 1660

Francisco de Valenzuela, the father of Fernando, served with the Spanish army in Flanders and Milan, before settling in the Kingdom of Naples, then part of the Crown of Aragon. His brother Cristobal was Governor of the town of Barletta, in Apulia and Francisco was appointed Governor or Regidor of Sant'Agata, a town in the Province of Naples.

After Francisco's death in 1640, his widowed wife Leonora, returned to Madrid and secured her son, Fernando, a position as page in the household of Duke of Infantado. From 1648 to 1655, Infantado was successively ambassador to Rome, Governor of Milán, and finally Viceroy of Sicily, before retiring to Spain, where he died in 1657.

Fernando Valenzuela served in the Spanish army in Italy, but as his career stagnated, he returned to Madrid in 1659. Two years later, he married Maria Ambrosia de Uceda, lady-in-waiting to Mariana of Austria, who gave him a position in her household as a wedding present. When Philip IV died in 1665, his son Charles II was only three years old and Mariana appointed regent by the Council of Castile. The next decade was dominated by a power struggle between Mariana and Charles' illegitimate half-brother, John of Austria the Younger, (1629-1679).

As government became more complex, individual rulers could no longer manage the administrative burden on their own and needed to delegate, hence the use of validos or privados. Often translated as 'favourite', 'trusted advisor' is a better description of the role; it was used in Spain in various forms from the 15th century to the late 18th century and formalised by Philip IV in 1620. English-language biographies of Valenzuela, such as his entry in the 1911 Encyclopædia Britannica, often reflect the 17th century view women were incapable of ruling without a man and imply a sexual relationship. Rather than depending on one person or 'valido', in reality Mariana used a number of different advisors.

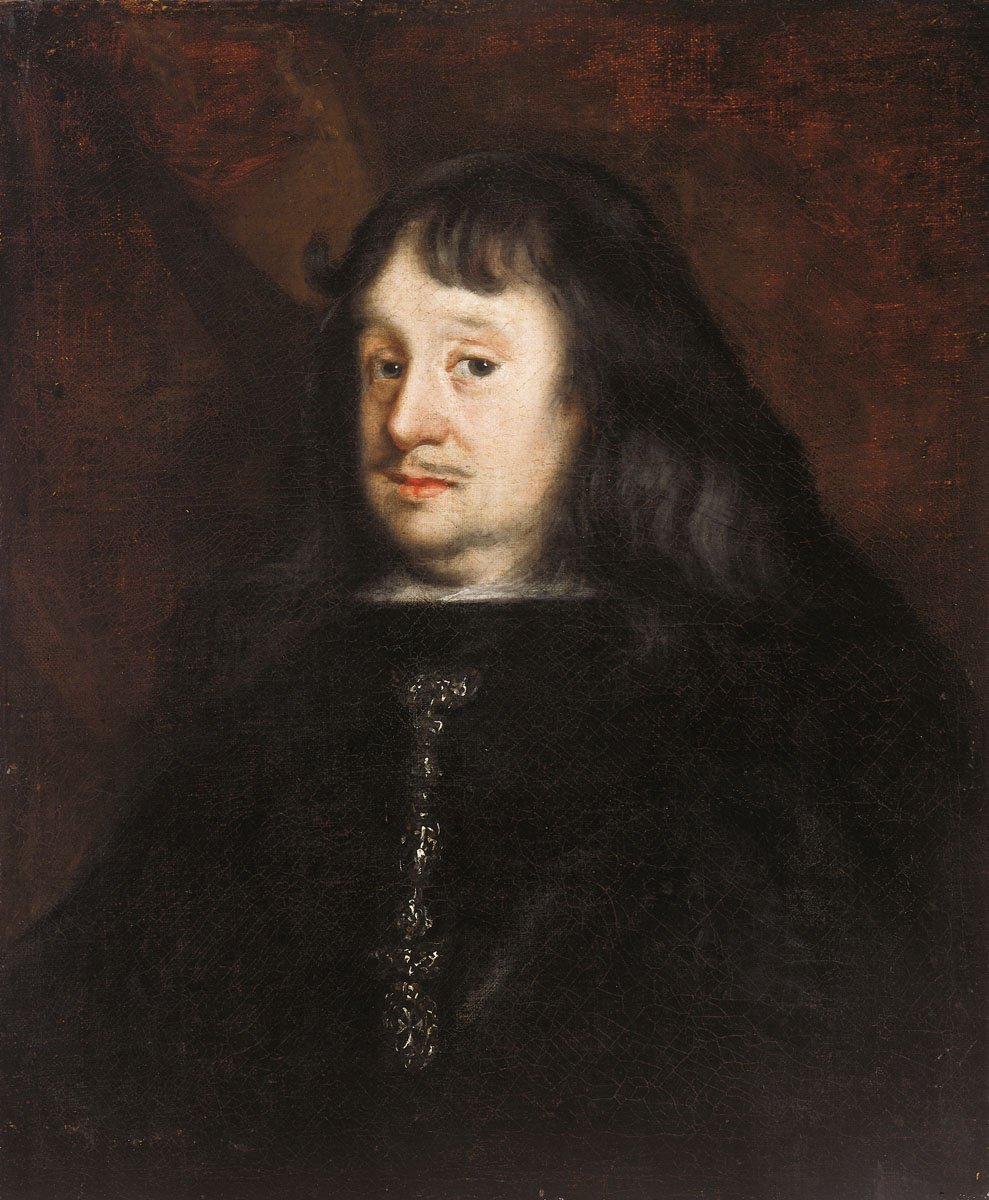
John of Austria the Younger; in 1677, he ousted Mariana and arrested Valenzuela

The instability that often accompanied royal minorities was heightened by Charles' ill-health and the likelihood he would die childless. The resulting contest between his co-heirs Louis XIV of France and Emperor Leopold split the Spanish political elite into Austrian and French factions. Mariana therefore preferred to rely on a small group of loyalists, who owed their careers to her. In addition to Valenzuela, these included her personal confessor Juan Everardo Nithard, who came with her from Vienna in 1659, and the Marquis de Aytona; all three were accused of being her lovers at one time or another.

After Nithard was forced from office in 1669, his role as 'valido' was filled by Aytona; when he died in March 1670, Valenzuela became more prominent. In 1671, he was made a knight of the Order of Santiago and appointed Introducer of Ambassadors; the position still exists and relates to protocol, rather than policy, the holder being responsible for co-ordinating acts and ceremonies related to Spanish foreign policy.

In 1673, he was appointed the Queen's Master of Horse, a major position that controlled logistics, royal processions and security. 17th century monarchies used ostentatious display to project power; Valenzuela was put in charge of public entertainments and building works, including the expansion of El Pardo, as well as sports and hunting expeditions for Charles. Such positions were normally held by grandees and in a carefully regulated and hierarchical society, this meant Valenzuela was viewed with great resentment.

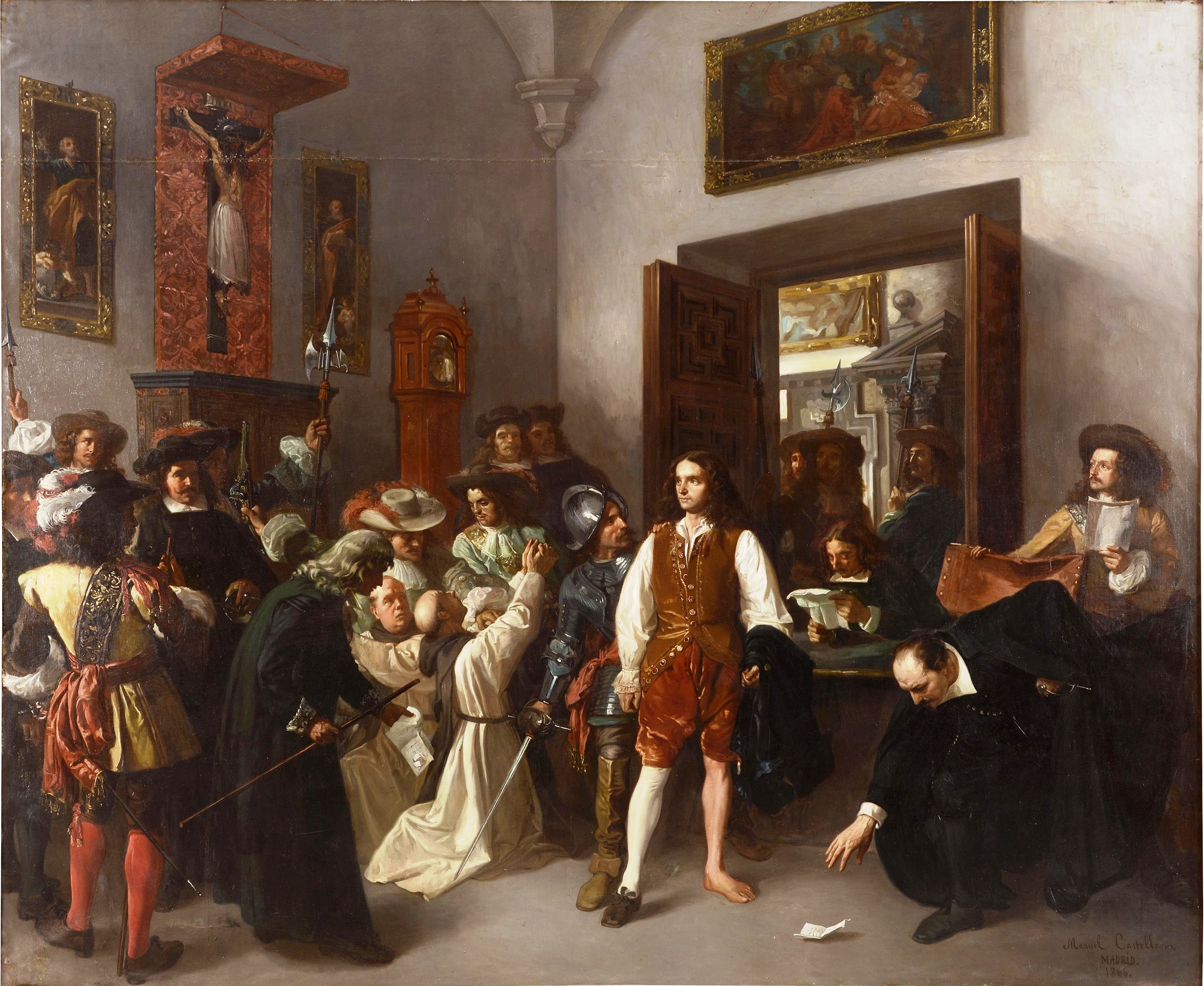
The arrest of Fernando de Valenzuela, by Manuel Castellano

The regency was formally dissolved when Charles turned 14 in 1675, although the Council of Castile agreed his disabilities required Mariana to control the decision-making process. John was sent to Sicily to put down the Messina revolt and Valenzuela made Marquis of Villasierra and Ambassador to Venice; however, he remained in Spain as Captain-General of Granada.

Valenzuela was recalled in June 1676 and made Master of Horse for the Royal Household, another post normally held by a grandee. Mariana responded to complaints by making him a grandee, then first minister in November; this was a step too far and on 24 December, a group of senior nobility issued a proclamation denouncing the administration. John was invited to take over government; in January 1677, he entered Madrid with 15,000 troops and despatched Mariana to a convent in Toledo. Valenzuela was stripped of titles and property, then exiled to the Philippines, where he was held in Fort San Felipe.

After John's death in 1679, Mariana regained control but Valenzuela was not recalled; he remained in the Philippines until September 1688, when he was allowed to settle in Mexico City. The Viceroy of New Spain was Infantado's nephew, Count Galve; with his help, Valenzuela received a pension and lived in some comfort. His title was restored, but not the grandeeship, while properties at San Bartolomé and Herradón de Pinares were returned to his wife in January 1689. He died on February 7, 1692, after being kicked by a horse.

== Legacy ==
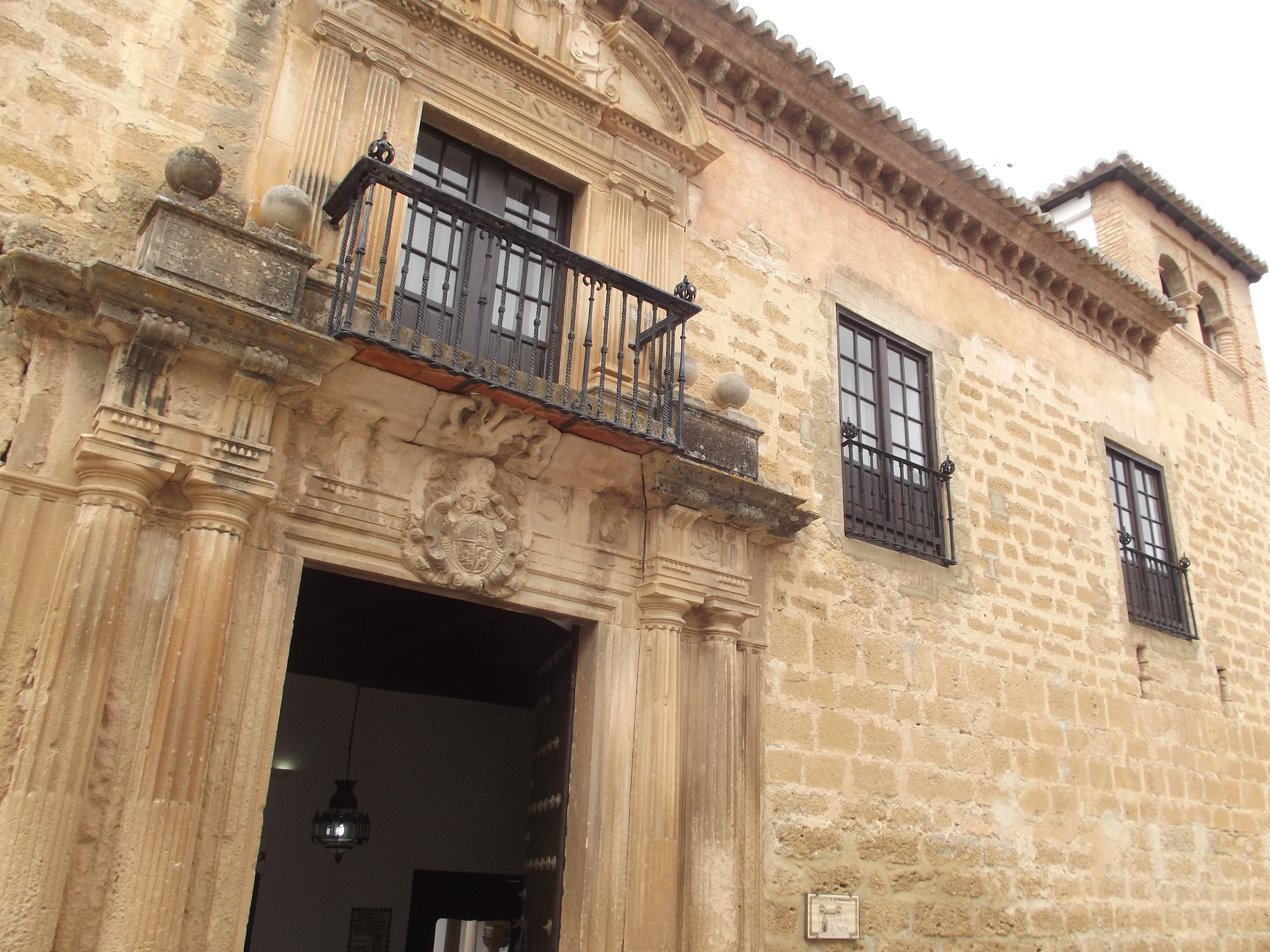
Palacio del Marqués de Villasierra, Ronda

The Palacio de Mondragón in Ronda is also known as the Palacio del Marqués de Villasierra; originally built by the Nasrid emirs, it was extensively remodelled by Fernando de Valenzuela Baena but passed out of the family until reacquired by his great-great-grandson in 1675. It is now the town museum.

It has been suggested Valenzuela was the inspiration for Victor Hugo's 1838 play Ruy Blas, although Hugo himself cites other sources. The plot closely resembles other works, including The Lady of Lyons, first played on 14 February 1838, nine months before Ruy Blas, and Molière's Les Précieuses ridicules.

== Sources ==
- Darby, Graham (2015). Spain in the Seventeenth Century. Routledge. ISBN 978-1138836440.
- Chisholm, Hugh, ed. (1911). "Valenzuela, Fernando de" . Encyclopædia Britannica. Vol. 27 (11th ed.). Cambridge University Press. p. 857.
- Contreras, Jaime (2011). Familias, poderes, instituciones y conflictos. Ediciones de la Universidad de Murcia. ISBN 978-8483719985. (Spanish language)
- Hermant, Héloïse (2012). Guerres de plumes : publicité et cultures politiques dans l'Espagne du XVIIe siècle. Casa de Velázquez. ISBN 978-8496820753. (French);
- Hilt, Douglas (1977). "Royal Favourites in Spain". History Today. 27 (6).
- Hobbs, Nicolas (2007). "Grandes de España" (in Spanish).
- Knighton, Tess (2005). Carreras Lopez, Juan José (ed.). The Royal Chapel in the time of the Habsburgs: Music and Court Ceremony in Early Modern Europe. Boydell Press. ISBN 978-1843831396.
- Mitchell, Sylvia Z (2013). Mariana of Austria and Imperial Spain: Court, Dynastic, and International Politics in Seventeenth- Century Europe. University of Miami PHD.
- Muir, Clive (2016). Ronda, a Tourist Guide for the "City of Dreams" In Andalucía (Kindle ed.). Lulu.
- Palos, Joan-Lluís; Sánchez, Magdalena (2016). Early Modern Dynastic Marriages and Cultural Transfer. Ashgate Press. ISBN 978-1472443212.
- Storrs, Christopher (2006). The Resilience of the Spanish Monarchy 1665-1700. OUP Oxford. ISBN 0199246378.

Spanish nobility
New title	Marquis of Villasierra; 1676–1692	Succeeded by Francisco de Valenzuela
