= Sant'Agata =

Sant'Agata may refer to:

== People ==
- Agatha of Sicily (Italian: Sant'Agata), an Italian Christian Saint

== Places of Italy ==
Municipalities (comuni)

- Sant'Agata Bolognese, in the Province of Bologna
- Sant'Agata de' Goti, in the Province of Benevento
- Sant'Agata del Bianco, in the Province of Reggio Calabria
- Sant'Agata di Esaro, in the Province of Cosenza
- Sant'Agata di Militello, in the Province of Messina
- Sant'Agata di Puglia, in the Province of Foggia
- Sant'Agata Fossili, in the Province of Alessandria
- Sant'Agata Feltria, in the Province of Rimini
- Sant'Agata li Battiati, in the Province of Catania
- Sant'Agata sul Santerno, in the Province of Ravenna
- Tovo di Sant'Agata, in the Province of Sondrio

Civil parishes (frazioni)

- Sant'Agata, in the municipality of Villanova sull'Arda (PC); seat of the Villa Verdi
- Sant'Agata Irpina, in the municipality of Solofra (AV)
- Sant'Agata Martesana, in the municipality of Cassina de' Pecchi (MI)
- Sant'Agata sui Due Golfi, frazione di Massa Lubrense (NA)

== Religious buildings ==
- Sant'Agata Cathedral, the cathedral of Catania
- Sant'Agata Chapel, a chapel of Pisa
- Sant'Agata dei Goti, a church of Rome
- Sant'Agata, Brescia
- Sant'Agata, Cremona

== See also ==
- Sainte-Agathe (disambiguation)
