= Roman Catholic Diocese of Massa Lubrense =

The Diocese of Massa Lubrense was a Roman Catholic diocese in Italy, located in Massa Lubrense, Naples in the ecclesiastical province of Sorrento.

== History ==
- 1024: Established as Diocese of Massa Lubrense (Dioecesis Massalubrensis)
- 27 Jun 1818: Suppressed (to Archdiocese of Sorrento)
- 1968: Restored as Titular Episcopal See of Massa Lubrense (Massalubrensis)

== Ordinaries ==
=== Diocese of Massa Lubrense ===
Erected: 1024
Latin Name: Massalubrensis

- Jacopo Scannapecora (15 Jan 1466 – 1506 Died)
- Gerolamo Castaldi (5 Jul 1506 – 1521 Died)
- Pietro de' Marchesi (12 Apr 1521 – 1544 Died)
- Gerolamo Borgia (1544 – 1550 Died)
- Giambatista Borgia (18 Mar 1545 – 1560 Died)
- Andrea Belloni (27 Jun 1560 – 1577 Died)
- Giuseppe Faraoni (9 Mar 1577 – 26 Nov 1581 Appointed, Bishop of Crotone)
- Giambattista Palma (1581 – 1594 Died)
- Lorenzo Asprella (19 Dec 1594 – 1605 Died)
- Agostino Quinzio, O.P. (17 Aug 1605 – 1611 Died)
- Ettore Gironda (24 Jan 1611 – 1626 Died)
- Maurizio Centini, O.F.M. Conv. (9 Feb 1626 – 12 May 1631 Appointed, Bishop of Mileto)
- Alessandro Gallo (24 Nov 1632 – 4 Mar 1645 Died)
- Gian Vincenzo de' Giuli (15 May 1645 – 19 Jan 1672 Died)
- Francesco Maria Neri (16 May 1672 – 10 Jan 1678 Appointed, Bishop of Venosa)
- Andrea Massarenghi (28 Mar 1678 – 29 Sep 1684 Died)
- Giovanni Battista Nepita (26 Mar 1685 – 12 Jul 1701 Died)
- Jacopo Maria Rossi (23 Jan 1702 – Jan 1738 Died)
- Giovanni Andrea Schiano (22 Jul 1738 – 12 Dec 1745 Died)
- Liborio Pisani (9 Mar 1746 – Jul 1756 Died)
- Giuseppe Bellotti (3 Jan 1757 – 11 May 1788 Died)
- Angelo Maria Vassalli, O.S.B. (18 Jun 1792 – 1797 Died)

== See also ==
- Catholic Church in Italy
