= Jacopo Scannapecora =

Italian Roman Catholic prelate

Most Reverend Jacopo Scannapecora
- Bishop of Massa Lubrense
- Church: Catholic Church
- Diocese: Diocese of Massa Lubrense
- In office: 1466–1506
- Successor: Gerolamo Castaldi

Personal details
- Died: 1506 Massa Lubrense, Naples

Jacopo Scannapecora (died 1506) was a Roman Catholic prelate who served as Bishop of Massa Lubrense (1466–1506).

== Biography ==
On 15 January 1466, Jacopo Scannapecora was appointed by Pope Paul II as Bishop of Massa Lubrense. He served as Bishop of Massa Lubrense until his death in 1506.

While bishop, he served as the principal co-consecrator of Scipione Cicinelli, Archbishop of Sorrento.

== External links and additional sources ==
- Cheney, David M. "Diocese of Massa Lubrense". Catholic-Hierarchy.org. (for Chronology of Bishops) ^{[self-published]}
- Chow, Gabriel. "Titular Episcopal See of Massa Lubrense". GCatholic.org. (for Chronology of Bishops) ^{[self-published]}

Catholic Church titles
Preceded by	Bishop of Massa Lubrense; 1466–1506	Succeeded by Gerolamo Castaldi
