= Pietro de' Marchesi =

Roman Catholic prelate

Most Reverend Pietro de' Marchesi
- Bishop of Massa Lubrense
- Church: Catholic Church
- Diocese: Diocese of Massa Lubrense
- In office: 1521–1544
- Predecessor: Gerolamo Castaldi
- Successor: Gerolamo Borgia

Personal details
- Died: 1544 Massa Lubrense, Naples

Pietro de' Marchesi (died 1544) was a Roman Catholic prelate who served as Bishop of Massa Lubrense (1521–1544).

== Career ==
On 12 April 1521, Marchesi was appointed during the papacy of Pope Leo X as Bishop of Massa Lubrense. He served as Bishop of Massa Lubrense until his death in 1544.

== External links and additional sources ==
- Cheney, David M. "Diocese of Massa Lubrense". Catholic-Hierarchy.org. (for Chronology of Bishops) ^{[self-published]}
- Chow, Gabriel. "Titular Episcopal See of Massa Lubrense". GCatholic.org. (for Chronology of Bishops) ^{[self-published]}

Catholic Church titles
Preceded by Gerolamo Castaldi	Bishop of Massa Lubrense; 1521–1544	Succeeded by Gerolamo Borgia
