= Ettore Gironda =

Roman Catholic prelate

Most Reverend Ettore Gironda
- Bishop of Massa Lubrense
- Church: Catholic Church
- Diocese: Diocese of Massa Lubrense
- In office: 1611–1626
- Predecessor: Agostino Quinzio
- Successor: Maurizio Centini

Personal details
- Died: 1626 Massa Lubrense, Naples

Ettore Gironda (died 1626) was a Roman Catholic prelate who served as Bishop of Massa Lubrense (1611–1626).

== Biography ==
On 24 January 1611, Ettore Gironda was appointed during the papacy of Pope Paul V as Bishop of Massa Lubrense. He served as Bishop of Massa Lubrense until his death in 1626.

== See also ==
- Catholic Church in Italy

== External links and additional sources ==
- Cheney, David M. "Diocese of Massa Lubrense". Catholic-Hierarchy.org. (for Chronology of Bishops) ^{[self-published]}
- Chow, Gabriel. "Titular Episcopal See of Massa Lubrense". GCatholic.org. (for Chronology of Bishops) ^{[self-published]}

Catholic Church titles
Preceded by Agostino Quinzio	Bishop of Massa Lubrense; 1611–1626	Succeeded by Maurizio Centini
