= Giambattista Palma =

Italian Roman Catholic prelate

Most Reverend Giambattista Palma
- Bishop of Massa Lubrense
- Church: Catholic Church
- Diocese: Diocese of Massa Lubrense
- In office: 1581–1594
- Predecessor: Giuseppe Faraoni
- Successor: Lorenzo Asprella

Personal details
- Died: 1594 Massa Lubrense, Naples

Giambattista Palma (died 1594) was a Roman Catholic prelate who served as Bishop of Massa Lubrense (1560–1577).

== Biography ==
In 1581, Giambattista Palma was appointed during the papacy of Pope Gregory XIII as Bishop of Massa Lubrense. He served as Bishop of Massa Lubrense until his death in 1594.

== External links and additional sources ==
- Cheney, David M. "Diocese of Massa Lubrense". Catholic-Hierarchy.org. (for Chronology of Bishops) ^{[self-published]}
- Chow, Gabriel. "Titular Episcopal See of Massa Lubrense". GCatholic.org. (for Chronology of Bishops) ^{[self-published]}

Catholic Church titles
Preceded by Giuseppe Faraoni	Bishop of Massa Lubrense; 1581–1594	Succeeded by Lorenzo Asprella
