= Gian Vincenzo de' Giuli =

Bishop of Massa Lubrense

Most Reverend Gian Vincenzo de' Giuli
- Bishop of Massa Lubrense
- Church: Catholic Church
- Diocese: Diocese of Massa Lubrense
- In office: 1645–1672
- Predecessor: Alessandro Gallo
- Successor: Francesco Maria Neri

Orders
- Consecration: 21 May 1645 by Giulio Cesare Sacchetti

Personal details
- Died: 19 January 1672 Massa Lubrense, Naples

Gian Vincenzo de' Giuli (died 19 January 1672) was a Roman Catholic prelate who served as Bishop of Massa Lubrense (1645–1672).

== Biography ==
On 15 May 1645, Gian Vincenzo de' Giuli was appointed by Pope Innocent X as Bishop of Massa Lubrense. On 21 May 1645, he was consecrated bishop by Giulio Cesare Sacchetti, Cardinal-Priest of Santa Susanna, with Alessandro Castracani, Bishop of Fano, and Papirio Silvestri, Bishop of Macerata e Tolentino, serving as co-consecrators. He served as Bishop of Massa Lubrense until his death on 19 January 1672.

== External links and additional sources ==
- Cheney, David M. "Diocese of Massa Lubrense". Catholic-Hierarchy.org. (for Chronology of Bishops) ^{[self-published]}
- Chow, Gabriel. "Titular Episcopal See of Massa Lubrense". GCatholic.org. (for Chronology of Bishops) ^{[self-published]}

Catholic Church titles
Preceded by Alessandro Gallo	Bishop of Massa Lubrense; 1645–1672	Succeeded by Francesco Maria Neri
