= Lorenzo Asprella =

Roman Catholic prelate

Most Reverend Lorenzo Asprella
- Bishop of Massa Lubrense
- Church: Catholic Church
- Diocese: Diocese of Massa Lubrense
- In office: 1594–1605
- Predecessor: Giambattista Palma
- Successor: Agostino Quinzio

Personal details
- Born: 1538 Tursien
- Died: 1605 (age 67) Massa Lubrense, Naples

Lorenzo Asprella (1538–1605) was a Roman Catholic prelate who served as Bishop of Massa Lubrense (1594–1605).

== Biography ==
Lorenzo Asprella was born in Tursien. On 19 December 1594, he was appointed during the papacy of Pope Clement VIII as Bishop of Massa Lubrense. He served as Bishop of Massa Lubrense until his death in 1605.

== See also ==
- Catholic Church in Italy

== External links and additional sources ==
- Cheney, David M. "Diocese of Massa Lubrense". Catholic-Hierarchy.org. (for Chronology of Bishops) ^{[self-published]}
- Chow, Gabriel. "Titular Episcopal See of Massa Lubrense". GCatholic.org. (for Chronology of Bishops) ^{[self-published]}

Catholic Church titles
| Preceded by Giambattista Palma | Bishop of Massa Lubrense; 1594–1605 | Succeeded by Agostino Quinzio |
