= Giambatista Borgia =

Italian Roman Catholic prelate

Most Reverend Giambatista Borgia
- Bishop of Massa Lubrense
- Church: Catholic Church
- Diocese: Diocese of Massa Lubrense
- In office: 1545–1560
- Predecessor: Gerolamo Borgia
- Successor: Andrea Belloni

Personal details
- Died: 1560 Massa Lubrense, Naples

Giambatista Borgia (died 1560) was an Italian Roman Catholic prelate who served as Bishop of Massa Lubrense (1545–1560).

== Biography ==
On 18 March 1545, he was appointed by Pope Paul III as Bishop of Massa Lubrense. He served as Bishop of Massa Lubrense until his death in 1560.

== External links and additional sources ==
- Cheney, David M. "Diocese of Massa Lubrense". Catholic-Hierarchy.org. (for Chronology of Bishops) ^{[self-published]}
- Chow, Gabriel. "Titular Episcopal See of Massa Lubrense". GCatholic.org. (for Chronology of Bishops) ^{[self-published]}

Catholic Church titles
Preceded by Gerolamo Borgia	Bishop of Massa Lubrense; 1545–1560	Succeeded by Andrea Belloni
