= Gerolamo Castaldi =

Italian Roman Catholic prelate

Most Reverend Gerolamo Castaldi
- Bishop of Massa Lubrense
- Church: Catholic Church
- Diocese: Diocese of Massa Lubrense
- In office: 1506–1521
- Predecessor: Jacopo Scannapecora
- Successor: Pietro de' Marchesi

Personal details
- Died: 1521 Massa Lubrense, Naples

Gerolamo Castaldi (died 1521) was a Roman Catholic prelate who served as Bishop of Massa Lubrense (1506–1521).

== Biography ==
On 5 July 1506, Gerolamo Castaldi was appointed during the papacy of Pope Julius II as Bishop of Massa Lubrense. He served as Bishop of Massa Lubrense until his death in 1521.

== See also ==
- Catholic Church in Italy

== External links and additional sources ==
- Cheney, David M. "Diocese of Massa Lubrense". Catholic-Hierarchy.org. (for Chronology of Bishops) ^{[self-published]}
- Chow, Gabriel. "Titular Episcopal See of Massa Lubrense". GCatholic.org. (for Chronology of Bishops) ^{[self-published]}

Catholic Church titles
Preceded by Jacopo Scannapecora	Bishop of Massa Lubrense; 1506–1521	Succeeded by Pietro de' Marchesi
