= Agostino Quinzio =

Roman Catholic prelate

Most Reverend Agostino Quinzio
- Bishop of Massa Lubrense
- Church: Catholic Church
- Diocese: Diocese of Massa Lubrense
- In office: 1605–1611
- Predecessor: Lorenzo Asprella
- Successor: Ettore Gironda
- Previous post: Bishop of Korčula (1573–1605)

Personal details
- Died: 1611 Massa Lubrense, Italy

Agostino Quinzio, O.P. (died 1611) was a Roman Catholic prelate who served as Bishop of Massa Lubrense (1605–1611) and Bishop of Korčula (1573–1605).

== Biography ==
Agostino Quinzio was ordained a priest in the Order of Preachers. On 17 June 1573, he was appointed by Pope Gregory XIII as Bishop of Korčula. On 17 August 1605, he was appointed by Pope Paul V as Bishop of Massa Lubrense. He served as Bishop of Massa Lubrense until his death in 1611.

== Episcopal succession ==
While bishop, he served as the co-consecrator of:

- Domenico Petrucci, Bishop of Strongoli (1582);
- Nicola Stridoni, Bishop of Mylopotamos (1582);
- Costanzo de Sarnano, Bishop of Vercelli (1587);
- Tadeo O'Farrell, Bishop of Clonfert (1587);
- Marcello Lorenzi, Bishop of Strongoli (1600);
- Jerónimo Bernardo de Quirós, Bishop of Castellammare di Stabia (1601);
- Paolo Isaresi della Mirandola, Bishop of Squillace (1601);
- Eustache Fontana, Bishop of Andros (1602);
- Gaspare Cardoso, Bishop of Potenza (1603);
- Angelo Baroni, Bishop of Kotor (1604);
- Azarias Friton, Archbishop of Nachitschewan (1604);
- Taddeo Sarti, Bishop of Nepi e Sutri (1604);
- Giuseppe Saladino, Bishop of Siracusa (1604);
- Marco Giustiniani, Bishop of Chios (1604);
- Diodato Gentile, Bishop of Caserta (1604);
- Martius Andreucci, Bishop of Trogir (1604);
- Giorgio Lazzari, Bishop of Minori (1604); and
- Paolo Manara, Bishop of Acerno (1604).

== External links and additional sources ==
- Cheney, David M. "Diocese of Korčula (Curzola, Cursola)". Catholic-Hierarchy.org. (for Chronology of Bishops) ^{[self-published]}
- Chow, Gabriel. "Titular Episcopal See of Korčula (Croatia)". GCatholic.org. (for Chronology of Bishops) ^{[self-published]}
- Cheney, David M. "Diocese of Massa Lubrense". Catholic-Hierarchy.org. (for Chronology of Bishops) ^{[self-published]}
- Chow, Gabriel. "Titular Episcopal See of Massa Lubrense". GCatholic.org. (for Chronology of Bishops) ^{[self-published]}

Catholic Church titles
Preceded by None	Bishop of Korčula; 1573–1605	Succeeded by Raphael Riva
Preceded by Lorenzo Asprella	Diocese of Massa Lubrense; 1605–1611	Succeeded by Ettore Gironda
