= Giovanni Battista Nepita =

Classic Roman figure

Most Reverend Giovanni Battista Nepita
- Bishop of Massa Lubrense
- Church: Catholic Church
- Diocese: Diocese of Massa Lubrense
- In office: 1685–1701
- Predecessor: Andrea Massarenghi
- Successor: Jacopo Maria Rossi
- Previous post: Bishop of Sant'Angelo dei Lombardi e Bisaccia (1680–1685)

Orders
- Ordination: 20 March 1649
- Consecration: 14 January 1680 by Alessandro Crescenzi (cardinal)

Personal details
- Born: 1624 Vastro Villari, Italy
- Died: 12 July 1701 (age 77) Massa Lubrense, Italy

Giovanni Battista Nepita (1624 – 12 July 1701) was a Roman Catholic prelate who served as Bishop of Massa Lubrense (1685–1701) and Bishop of Sant'Angelo dei Lombardi e Bisaccia (1680–1685).

== Biography ==
Giovanni Battista Nepita was born in Castrovillari, Italy, in 1624 and ordained a priest on 20 March 1649. On 8 January 1680, he was appointed during the papacy of Pope Innocent XI as Bishop of Sant'Angelo dei Lombardi e Bisaccia. On 14 January 1680, he was consecrated bishop by Alessandro Crescenzi (cardinal), Bishop of Recanati e Loreto, with Domenico Gianuzzi, Titular Bishop of Dioclea in Phrygia, and Pier Antonio Capobianco, Bishop Emeritus of Lacedonia, serving as co-consecrators. On 26 March 1685, he was appointed during the papacy of Pope Gregory XIII as Bishop of Massa Lubrense. He served as Bishop of Massa Lubrense until his death on 12 July 1701.

== External links and additional sources ==
- Cheney, David M. "Diocese of Sant'Angelo dei Lombardi e Bisaccia". Catholic-Hierarchy.org. (for Chronology of Bishops) ^{[self-published]}
- Chow, Gabriel. "Archdiocese of Sant'Angelo dei Lombardi–Conza–Nusco–Bisaccia". GCatholic.org. (for Chronology of Bishops) ^{[self-published]}
- Cheney, David M. "Diocese of Massa Lubrense". Catholic-Hierarchy.org. (for Chronology of Bishops) ^{[self-published]}
- Chow, Gabriel. "Titular Episcopal See of Massa Lubrense". GCatholic.org. (for Chronology of Bishops) ^{[self-published]}

Catholic Church titles
Preceded by Tommaso de Rosa	Bishop of Sant'Angelo dei Lombardi e Bisaccia; 1680–1685	Succeeded by Giuseppe Mastellone
Preceded by Andrea Massarenghi	Bishop of Massa Lubrense; 1685–1701	Succeeded by Jacopo Maria Rossi
