= Alessandro Gallo =

Italian Roman Catholic prelate

Most Reverend Alessandro Gallo
- Bishop of Massa Lubrense
- Church: Catholic Church
- Diocese: Diocese of Massa Lubrense
- In office: 1632–1645
- Predecessor: Maurizio Centini
- Successor: Gian Vincenzo de' Giuli

Orders
- Consecration: 8 December 1632 by Giovanni Battista Pamphili

Personal details
- Died: 4 March 1645 Massa Lubrense, Naples

Alessandro Gallo (died 4 March 1645) was a Roman Catholic prelate who served as Bishop of Massa Lubrense (1632–1645).

== Biography ==
On 24 November 1632, Alessandro Gallo was appointed by Pope Urban VIII as Bishop of Massa Lubrense. On 8 December 1632, he was consecrated bishop by Giovanni Battista Pamphili, Cardinal-Priest of Sant’Eusebio with Tommaso Cellesi, Archbishop of Dubrovnik, and Celso Zani, Bishop of Città della Pieve, as co-consecrators. He served as Bishop of Massa Lubrense until his death on 4 March 1645.

While bishop, he was the principal co-consecrator of Girolamo Martini, Bishop of Ugento (1637).

== External links and additional sources ==
- Cheney, David M. "Diocese of Massa Lubrense". Catholic-Hierarchy.org. (for Chronology of Bishops) ^{[self-published]}
- Chow, Gabriel. "Titular Episcopal See of Massa Lubrense". GCatholic.org. (for Chronology of Bishops) ^{[self-published]}

Catholic Church titles
Preceded by Maurizio Centini	Bishop of Massa Lubrense; 1632–1645	Succeeded by Gian Vincenzo de' Giuli
