= Gerolamo Borgia =

Italian Roman Catholic prelate

Most Reverend Gerolamo Borgia
- Bishop of Massa Lubrense
- Church: Catholic Church
- Diocese: Diocese of Massa Lubrense
- In office: 1544–1550
- Predecessor: Pietro de' Marchesi
- Successor: Giambatista Borgia

Personal details
- Born: 1475 Senise, Italy
- Died: 1550 (age 75) Massa Lubrense, Naples

Gerolamo Borgia (1475–1550) was a Roman Catholic prelate who served as Bishop of Massa Lubrense (1544–1550).

== Biography ==
Gerolamo Borgia was born in Senise, Italy in 1475. In 1544, he was appointed during the papacy of Pope Leo X as Bishop of Massa Lubrense. He served as Bishop of Massa Lubrense until his death in 1550.

== See also ==
- Catholic Church in Italy

== External links and additional sources ==
- Cheney, David M. "Diocese of Massa Lubrense". Catholic-Hierarchy.org. (for Chronology of Bishops) ^{[self-published]}
- Chow, Gabriel. "Titular Episcopal See of Massa Lubrense". GCatholic.org. (for Chronology of Bishops) ^{[self-published]}

Catholic Church titles
Preceded by Pietro de' Marchesi	Bishop of Massa Lubrense; 1544–1550	Succeeded by Giambatista Borgia
