= Andrea Belloni =

Italian Roman Catholic prelate

Most Reverend Andrea Belloni
- Bishop of Massa Lubrense
- Church: Catholic Church
- Diocese: Diocese of Massa Lubrense
- In office: 1560–1577
- Predecessor: Giambatista Borgia
- Successor: Giuseppe Faraoni

Personal details
- Died: 1577 Massa Lubrense, Naples

Andrea Belloni (died 1577) was a Roman Catholic prelate who served as Bishop of Massa Lubrense (1560–1577).

== Biography ==
On 27 June 1560, he was appointed during the papacy of Pope Pius IV as Bishop of Massa Lubrense. He served as Bishop of Massa Lubrense until his death in 1577.

== External links and additional sources ==
- Cheney, David M. "Diocese of Massa Lubrense". Catholic-Hierarchy.org. (for Chronology of Bishops) ^{[self-published]}
- Chow, Gabriel. "Titular Episcopal See of Massa Lubrense". GCatholic.org. (for Chronology of Bishops) ^{[self-published]}

Catholic Church titles
Preceded by Giambatista Borgia	Bishop of Massa Lubrense; 1560–1577	Succeeded by Giuseppe Faraoni
