= Gregorio Panzani =

Italian priest

Gregorio Panzani (died 1662) was an Italian Catholic priest, who became Bishop of Mileto and a papal emissary to England during the reign of King Charles I of England.

== Life ==
Gregorio Panzani received a Doctorate in utroque iure (in both civil law and canon law) at the Archiginnasio di Roma on 7 March 1625. He joined the Congregation of the Oratory, becoming a priest, but, on account of ill-health, he resigned and became a secular priest of the diocese of Arezzo. In 1634 he was chosen by Cardinal Antonio Barberini for the important and delicate task of a secret agency in London. He is described by the writer of his memoirs as a man:

...of experienced virtue, of singular address, of polite learning and in all respects well qualified for the business.

Barberini was keen to gain more information about the progress of Catholics in England and Panzani's commission was to gain first-hand information as to the state of English Catholics. English Catholics were then much divided on the question of the oath of allegiance and the appointment of a vicar Apostolic and moves were afoot to settle the differences that had arisen on these points between the seculars and regulars and to establish informal relations between Barberini's uncle Pope Urban VIII and the Government.

Panzani himself realized that the appointment of a bishop was necessary, and he resented the efforts of the Jesuits to hinder this. Though he was successful in reconciling seculars with the Benedictines and other Catholics, the Jesuits were left out of the settlement, and Panzani's subsequent efforts to bring them in were fruitless.

Panzani had repeated interviews with Windebank and Lord Cottington, the secretaries of state, enjoyed (like Rossetti) the confidence of the Queen, Henrietta Maria, and was admitted to secret audience with King Charles. He was also in communication with Richard Montagu, the Anglican Bishop of Chichester on the subject of corporate reunion.

He was recalled at the end of the year 1636 when a scheme of reciprocal agency was established between Pope Urban VIII and the Queen. Returning to Rome he was made a canon of S. Lorenzo in Damaso, and obtained a judicial position in the civil courts. On 13 August 1640, he was elected Bishop of Mileto, in the Province of Catanzaro.

== Account of his mission ==
An account of his English mission was written in Italian by someone who had access to his papers, and a copy of this was used by Charles Dodd, who, however, thought it imprudent to publish these memoirs in full. But in 1793, Joseph Berington published a translation of them with an historical introduction and supplement. Their authenticity was immediately called in question by Charles Plowden, who regarded them as a forgery by Dodd. The subsequent researches by M. A. Tierney, however, conclusively proved that the Memoirs were genuine. The original manuscript, then in the possession of Cardinal Filippo Antonio Gualterio, was purchased by the British Museum in 1854 (Add. Manuscripts 15389).

Catholic Church titles
| Preceded by Maurizio Centini | Bishop of Mileto; 1640–1660 | Succeeded by Diego Castiglione Morelli |
