= Maurizio Centini =

Roman Catholic prelate

Most Reverend Maurizio Centini
- Bishop of Mileto
- Church: Catholic Church
- Diocese: Diocese of Mileto
- In office: 1631–1639
- Predecessor: Virgilio Cappone
- Successor: Gregorio Panzani
- Previous post: Bishop of Massa Lubrense (1626–1631)

Orders
- Consecration: March 1626 by Felice Centini

Personal details
- Born: 1592 Ascoli, Italy
- Died: 14 November 1639 (age 47) Mileto, Italy

Maurizio Centini, O.F.M. Conv. (1592 – 14 November 1639) was a Roman Catholic prelate who served as Bishop of Mileto (1631–1639) and Bishop of Massa Lubrense (1626–1631).

== Biography ==
Maurizio Centini was born in 1592 in Ascoli, Italy and ordained a priest in the Order of Friars Minor Conventual. On 9 February 1626, he was appointed during the papacy of Pope Urban VIII as Bishop of Massa Lubrense. In March 1626, he was consecrated bishop by Felice Centini, Bishop of Macerata e Tolentino. On 12 May 1631, he was appointed during the papacy of Pope Urban VIII as Bishop of Mileto. He served as Bishop of Mileto until his death on 14 November 1639. While bishop, he was the principal co-consecrator of Hector de Monte, Bishop of Termoli (1626).

== See also ==
- Catholic Church in Italy

== External links and additional sources ==
- Cheney, David M. "Diocese of Mileto–Nicotera–Tropea". Catholic-Hierarchy.org. (for Chronology of Bishops) ^{[self-published]}
- Chow, Gabriel. "Diocese of Mileto–Nicotera–Tropea (Italy)". GCatholic.org. (for Chronology of Bishops) ^{[self-published]}
- Cheney, David M. "Diocese of Massa Lubrense". Catholic-Hierarchy.org. (for Chronology of Bishops) ^{[self-published]}
- Chow, Gabriel. "Titular Episcopal See of Massa Lubrense". GCatholic.org. (for Chronology of Bishops) ^{[self-published]}

Catholic Church titles
Preceded by Ettore Gironda	Bishop of Massa Lubrense; 1626–1631	Succeeded by Alessandro Gallo
Preceded by Virgilio Cappone	Bishop of Mileto; 1631–1639	Succeeded by Gregorio Panzani
