= Innico d'Avalos d'Aragona =

17th-century Catholic cardinal

His Eminence Innico d'Avalos d'Aragona
- Cardinal-Bishop of Porto e Santa Rufina
- Church: Catholic Church
- In office: 1591–1600
- Previous post: Bishop of Mileto (1566–73)

Orders
- Consecration: 13 October 1566 by Pope Pius V
- Created cardinal: 26 February 1561 by Pope Pius IV
- Rank: Cardinal-Bishop

Personal details
- Born: c. 1535 Naples, Kingdom of Naples
- Died: 20 February 1600 (aged c. 65) Rome, Papal States

Innico d'Avalos d'Aragona (1535/36–1600) was an Italian Cardinal, from Naples.

He was the son of condottiero Alfonso d'Avalos and Maria d'Aragona, from the family of the Dukes of Montalto, Spanish nobility. In 1563, he constructed the Castello d'Avalos on Procida, a small island in the Gulf of Naples.

After a period as lay administrator (he was for a while Chancellor of the Kingdom of Naples, he was made bishop of Mileto in 1566, bishop of Sabina in 1586, bishop of Frascati in 1589, bishop of Porto e Santa Rufina in 1591.

In Spain, another clergyman member of this family was cardinal Gaspar Dávalos de la Cueva.

== Episcopal succession ==
Episcopal succession of Innico d'Avalos d'Aragona

While bishop, he was the principal consecrator of:

- Francesco Cittadini, Bishop of Castro del Lazio (1569);
- Girolamo Rustici, Bishop of Tropea (1570);
- Lelio Zibramonti, Bishop of Alba (1583);
- Maffeo Venier, Archbishop of Corfù (1583);
- Scipione Gonzaga, Titular Patriarch of Jerusalem (1585);

and the principal co-consecrator of:

- Francisco Pacheco de Toledo, Bishop of Burgos (1567).

Catholic Church titles
| Preceded by Giovanni Battista Consiglieri | Cardinal-Deacon of Santa Lucia in Septisolio; 1561–1563 | Succeeded by Luigi d'Este |
| Preceded by Cesare Cibo | Administrator of Turin; 1563–1564 | Succeeded by Girolamo della Rovere |
| Preceded by Odet de Coligny de Châtillon | Cardinal-Deacon/Cardinal-Priest of Sant'Adriano al Foro; 1563–1565 (Deacon) and 1565–1567 (Priest) | Succeeded by Fulvio Giulio della Corgna |
| Preceded by Quinzio Rustici | Bishop of Mileto; 1566–1573 | Succeeded by Giovan Mario de Alessandri |
| Preceded by Fulvio Giulio della Corgna | Cardinal-Priest of San Lorenzo in Lucina; 1567–1586 | Succeeded by Marcantonio Colonna (seniore) |
| Preceded by Antoine Perrenot de Granvella | Cardinal-Bishop of Sabina; 1586–1589 | Succeeded by Tolomeo Gallio |
| Preceded by Alfonso Gesualdo di Conza | Cardinal-Bishop of Frascati; 1589–1591 | Succeeded by Tolomeo Gallio |
| Preceded by Alfonso Gesualdo di Conza | Cardinal-Bishop of Porto e Santa Rufina; 1591–1600 | Succeeded by Tolomeo Gallio |
