= Giuseppe Faraoni =

Italian Roman Catholic prelate

Most Reverend Giuseppe Faraon
- Bishop of Crotone
- Church: Catholic Church
- Diocese: Diocese of Crotone
- In office: 1581–1588
- Predecessor: Marcello Maiorana
- Successor: Mario Bolognini
- Previous post: Bishop of Massa Lubrense (1577–1581)

Personal details
- Died: 1588 Crotone, Italy

Giuseppe Faraon (died 1588) was a Roman Catholic prelate who served as Bishop of Crotone (1581–1588) and Bishop of Massa Lubrense (1577–1581).

== Biography ==
On 9 March 1577, Giuseppe Faraon was appointed during the papacy of Pope Gregory XIII as Bishop of Massa Lubrense. On 26 November 1581, he was appointed during the papacy of Pope Gregory XIII as Bishop of Crotone. He served as Bishop of Crotone until his death in 1588.

== See also ==
- Catholic Church in Italy

== External links and additional sources ==
- Cheney, David M. "Diocese of Massa Lubrense". Catholic-Hierarchy.org. (for Chronology of Bishops) ^{[self-published]}
- Chow, Gabriel. "Titular Episcopal See of Massa Lubrense". GCatholic.org. (for Chronology of Bishops) ^{[self-published]}
- Cheney, David M. "Archdiocese of Crotone-Santa Severina". Catholic-Hierarchy.org. (for Chronology of Bishops) ^{[self-published]}
- Chow, Gabriel. "Archdiocese of Crotone-Santa Severina". GCatholic.org. (for Chronology of Bishops) ^{[self-published]}

Catholic Church titles
Preceded by Andrea Belloni	Bishop of Massa Lubrense; 1577–1581	Succeeded by Giambattista Palma
Preceded by Marcello Maiorana	Bishop of Crotone; 1581–1588	Succeeded by Mario Bolognini
