= Sainte-Agathe =

Sainte-Agathe or St. Agatha may refer to the following places:

- Ste. Agathe, Manitoba, Canada, an unincorporated community
- Sainte-Agathe, Puy-de-Dôme, Thiers, France, a commune
- Sainte-Agathe-de-Lotbinière, Quebec, Canada
- Sainte-Agathe-des-Monts, Quebec, Canada
- St. Agatha, Maine, United States, a town
- St. Agatha, Ontario, a rural community in Wilmot Township, Canada
- Sankt Agatha, a municipality in Upper Austria

== See also ==
- Agatha of Sicily, a Christian saint
- Sant'Agata (disambiguation)
