= Quinzio Rustici =

Italian Roman Catholic prelate

Most Reverend Quinzio Rustici
- Bishop of Mileto
- Church: Catholic Church
- Diocese: Diocese of Mileto
- In office: 1523–1566
- Predecessor: Andrea della Valle
- Successor: Iñigo Avalos de Aragón

Orders
- Consecration: 19 March 1535 by Girolamo Grimaldi

Personal details
- Born: Rome, Italy
- Died: 1566

Quinzio Rustici (died 1566) was a Roman Catholic prelate who served as Bishop of Mileto (1523–1566).

== Biography ==
Quinzio Rustici was born in Rome, Italy. On 26 November 1523, he was appointed during the papacy of Pope Clement VII as Bishop of Mileto. On 19 March 1535, he was consecrated bishop by Girolamo Grimaldi, Cardinal-Deacon of San Giorgio in Velabro. He served as Bishop of Mileto until his death in 1566.

== External links and additional sources ==
- Cheney, David M. "Diocese of Mileto–Nicotera–Tropea". Catholic-Hierarchy.org. (for Chronology of Bishops) ^{[self-published]}
- Chow, Gabriel. "Diocese of Mileto–Nicotera–Tropea (Italy)". GCatholic.org. (for Chronology of Bishops) ^{[self-published]}

Catholic Church titles
Preceded by Andrea della Valle	Bishop of Mileto; 1523–1566	Succeeded by Iñigo Avalos de Aragón
