= Sant'Agata sui Due Golfi =

- Frazione
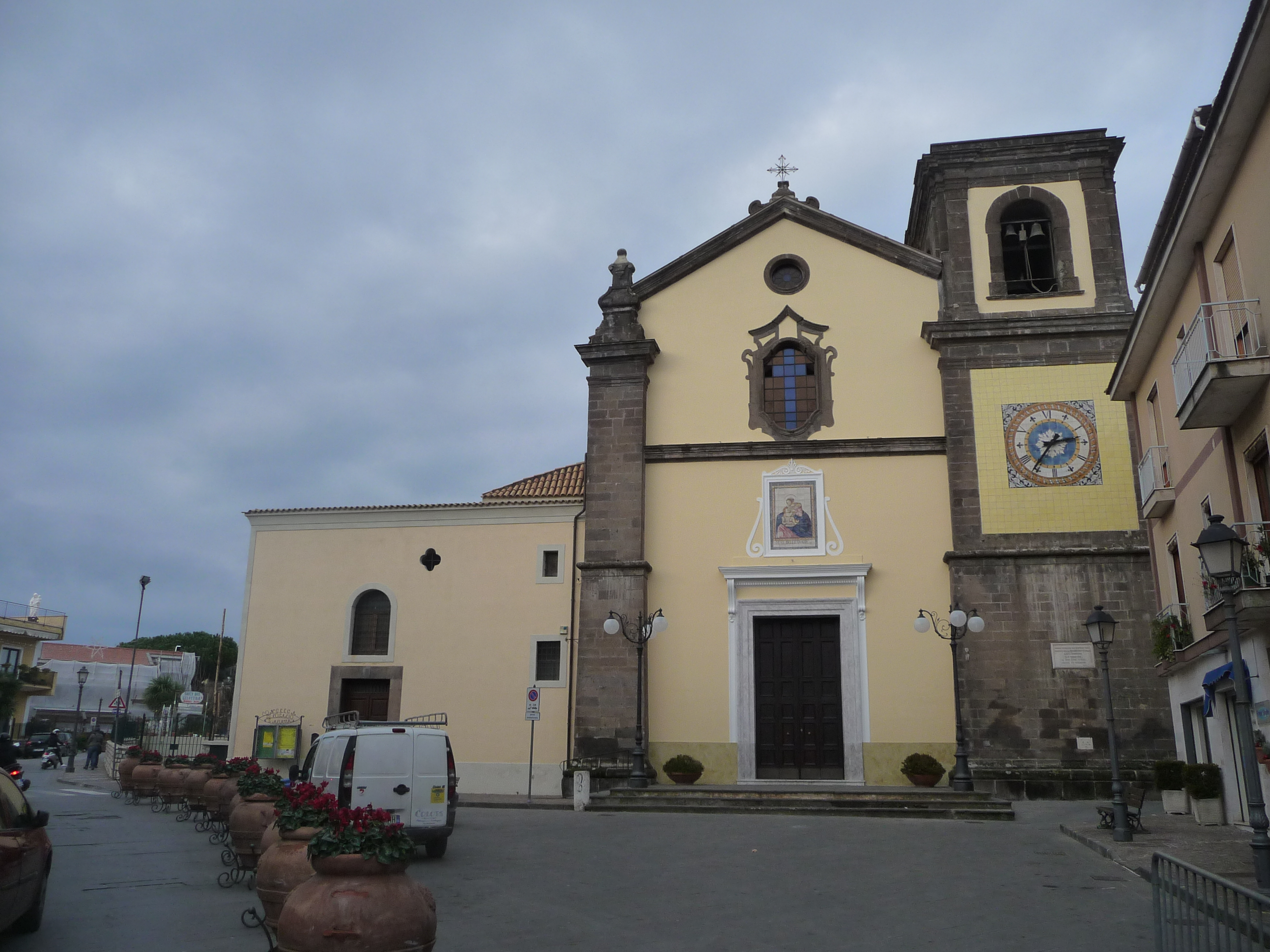
- Church of Santa Maria delle Grazie

- Location of Sant'Agata sui Due Golfi in Italy
- Coordinates: 40°36′27.24″N 14°22′25.32″E
- Country: Italy
- Region: Campania
- Province: Naples (NA)
- Comune: Massa Lubrense
- Elevation: 390 m (1,280 ft)

Population (2001)
  - Total: 3,000
- Demonym: Santagatesi
- Time zone: UTC+1 (CET)
  - Summer (DST): UTC+2 (CEST)
- Postal code: 80061
- Dialing code: (+39) 081
- Patron saint: Saint Agatha of Sicily
- Website: Official website

Sant'Agata sui Due Golfi is an Italian village, the major hamlet (frazione) of the municipality of Massa Lubrense in the Province of Naples, Campania region. It is part of the Sorrentine Peninsula and its population is around 3,000.

== History ==
The first inhabitants were Greek settlers that built a Necropolis in a place now called "Deserto".

== Geography ==
The name suffix sui due golfi (Italian for "upon two gulfs") refers to the location of Sant'Agata, that lies on a hill between the gulfs of Naples and Salerno. Near its territory, on the coast, is located the natural fjord of Crapolla.

Its main road (SS 145, directly linked to the Amalfi Drive) links Sorrento (6 km far) and Massa Lubrense (4,5 km) with Positano (17 km) and the rest of the Amalfi Coast. Sant'Agata is 24 km far from Castellammare di Stabia, 32 from Amalfi, 57 from Naples and 63 from Salerno.

== See also ==
- Crapolla
- Sirenuse
- Amalfi Coast
- Sorrentine Peninsula
