= Diocese of Mileto-Nicotera-Tropea =

Roman Catholic diocese in Italy

Coordinates: 38.6167°N 16.0667°E

Diocese of Mileto-Nicotera-Tropea Dioecesis Miletensis-Nicotriensis-Tropiensis

Catholic
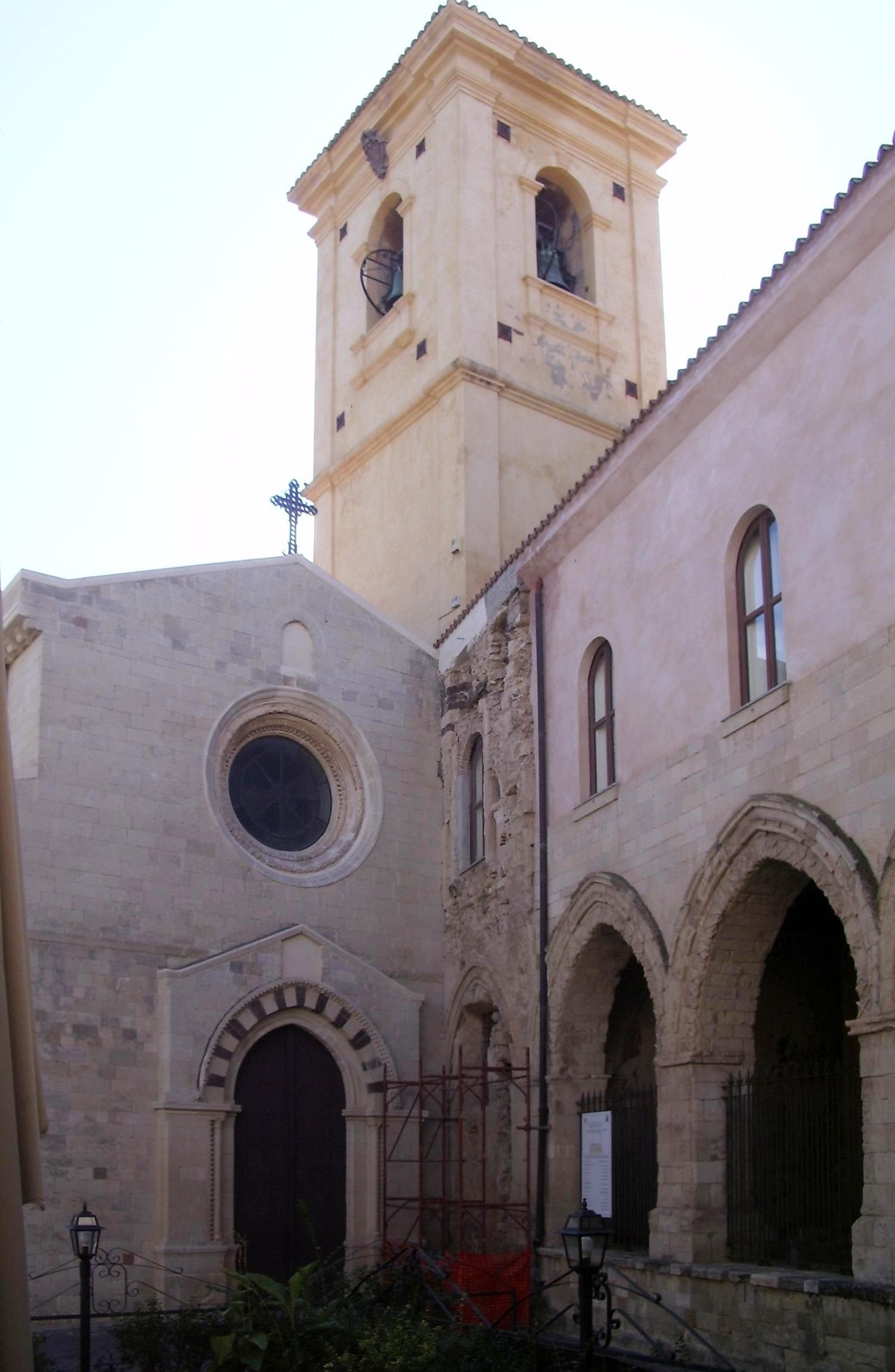
- Co-cathedral in Tropea

Location
- Country: Italy
- Ecclesiastical province: Reggio Calabria-Bova

Statistics
- Area: 943 km^{2} (364 sq mi)
- Population: Total; Catholics: (as of 2023); 170,000 (est.) ▼; 155,000 (est.) ▼
- Parishes: 133 ▲

Information
- Denomination: Catholic Church
- Rite: Roman Rite
- Established: 11th century
- Cathedral: Cattedrale di Maria SS. Assunta in Cielo (Mileto)
- Co-cathedral: Concattedrale di S. Maria Assunta (Nicotera); Concattedrale di Maria SS. di Romania (Tropea)
- Secular priests: 115 (diocesan) ▼18 ▼ (Religious Orders); 18 Permanent Deacons

Current leadership
- Pope: Leo XIV
- Bishop: Attilio Nostro
- Bishops emeritus: Luigi Renzo

Map

Website
- www.diocesimileto.it/

The Diocese of Mileto-Nicotera-Tropea (Latin: Dioecesis Miletensis-Nicotriensis-Tropiensis) is a Latin diocese of the Catholic Church in Calabria, southern Italy, created in 1986. In that year the historical Diocese of Mileto was united with the Diocese of Nicotera-Tropea. The diocese is a suffragan of the Archdiocese of Reggio Calabria-Bova.

== History ==
The town of Mileto was founded as a fortress by Roger I, Count of Sicily in 1058, and he resided there from time to time, dealing with the rebels of Calabria. It was Count Roger who petitioned the pope to create a diocese at Mileto. Mileto was made an episcopal see by Pope Gregory VII in 1073, who suppressed the diocese of Vibona permanently and transferred its territory and assets to Mileto. The Pope personally consecrated its first bishop, Arnolfo.

Pope Urban II visited Mileto in June 1091. On 3 October 1093, Urban II confirmed the privileges of the diocese of Mileto, and the suppression of the diocese of Tauriana and the diocese of Vibona.

Roger II, King of Sicily, was born and baptized in Mileto in 1095.

On 23 December 1121 Pope Callixtus II confirmed once again the union of the diocese of Mileto with the diocese of Tauriana and diocese of Vibona, the latter destroyed by the Saracens. He also granted the plea of Bishop Gaufredus that bishops of Mileto would continue in perpetuity to be consecrated by the Pope personally, as had been the case with his predecessors.

The earthquake of 1783 destroyed the cathedral, built by Count Roger, who also built the monastery of the Most Holy Trinity and St. Michael for Greek Basilian monks.

=== Diocesan reorganization ===
The Second Vatican Council (1962–1965), in order to ensure that all Catholics received proper spiritual attention, decreed the reorganization of the diocesan structure of Italy and the consolidation of small and struggling dioceses. It also recommended the abolition of anomalous units such as exempt territorial prelatures. These considerations applied to Mileto and to Nicotero e Tropea.

On 18 February 1984, the Vatican and the Italian State signed a new and revised concordat. Based on the revisions, a set of Normae was issued on 15 November 1984, which was accompanied in the next year, on 3 June 1985, by enabling legislation. According to the agreement, the practice of having one bishop govern two separate dioceses at the same time, aeque personaliter, was abolished. Instead, the Vatican continued consultations which had begun under Pope John XXIII for the merging of small dioceses, especially those with personnel and financial problems, into one combined diocese. On 30 September 1986, Pope John Paul II ordered that the dioceses of Mileto, Nicotero and Tropea be merged into one diocese with one bishop, with the Latin title Dioecesis Miletensis-Nicotriensis-Tropiensis. The seat of the diocese was to be in Mileto, and the cathedral of Mileto was to serve as the cathedral of the merged dioceses. The cathedrals in Nicotero and Tropea were to become co-cathedrals, and the cathedral Chapters were each to be a Capitulum Concathedralis. There was to be only one diocesan Tribunal, in Mileto, and likewise one seminary, one College of Consultors, and one Priests' Council. The territory of the new diocese was to include the territory of the former dioceses of Mileto, Nicotero and Tropea.

== Bishops ==
=== Diocese of Mileto ===
Erected: 11th Century
Latin Name: Miletensis
Immediately Subject to the Holy See

==== from 1073 to 1500 ====
- Arnolfo (1073–1077)
- Hiosphorus (1077–1090)
- Giraldus (attested 1093)
- Gaufridus (attested 1094)
- Eberardus (attested 1099)

Sede vacante (1104)

- Gaufridus (attested 1122)
- Reynaldus
- Anselmus (attested 1175 – 1181)

...

- Nicolaus (attested 1198 – 1200)
- Petrus (attested 1207 – 1213)
- Rogerius (attested 1216 – 1231)
- Rivibardus
- Jacobus, O.P.
- Dominicus (22 April 1252 – 1281)
- Deodatus, O.P. (25 September 1282 – 1286)
- Saba Malaspina (12 July 1286 – ? )
- Andreas, O.Cist. (1298–1312)
- Manfredus Gifoni (7 July 1312 – 5 November 1328)
- Goffredo Fazari (1329 – 1339?)
- Petrus de Valerianis (2 July 1348 – 1373)
- Tommaso de Buccamungellis (1373–1391)
- Henricus de Solana (19 September 1395 – ) Avignon Obedience
- Andreas d'Alagni ( ? –1402) Roman Obedience
- Corrado Caraccioli (2 Oct 1402 – 1411) Roman Obedience
- Astorgio Agnensi (18 September 1411 – 15 February 1413)
- Jacobus, O.Cist. (15 February 1413 – 1432?)
- Dominico (1432–1437)
- Antonio Sorbillo (26 Jul 1437 – 1463 Died)
- Cesare de Grieto, O.Cist. (1 October 1463 – 1473?)
- Narcisso de Verduno (25 June 1473 – 1476?)
- Antonio de Pazzi (26 February 1477 – 1480?)
- Giacomo della Rovere (18 Aug 1480 – 6 Mar 1504)

==== from 1500 to 1800 ====
- Francesco Alidosi (6 Mar 1504 – 26 Mar 1505)
- Sisto Franciotto della Rovere (1505 – 23 Feb 1508)
- Andrea della Valle (23 Feb 1508 – 26 Nov 1523 Resigned)
- Quinzio Rustici (26 Nov 1523 – 1566 Died)
- Iñigo Avalos de Aragón, O.S. (19 Aug 1566 – 9 Feb 1573 Resigned)
- Giovan Mario de Alessandris (9 Feb 1573 – 1585 Died)
- Marco Antonio del Tufo (21 Oct 1585 – 1606 Died)
- Giambattista Leni (4 July 1608 – 3 August 1611)
- Cardinal Felice Centini, O.F.M. Conv. (31 August 1611 – 23 September 1613)
- Virgilio Cappone (13 Nov 1613 – 1631 Died)
- Maurizio Centini, O.F.M. Conv. (12 May 1631 – 14 Nov 1639 Died)
- Gregorio Panzani, C.O. (13 Aug 1640 – 25 Jun 1660 Died)
- Diego Castiglione Morelli (26 Jun 1662 – 17 May 1680 Died)
- Ottavio Paravicino (12 May 1681 – 26 Sep 1695 Died)
- Domenico Antonio Bernardini (18 Jun 1696 – Jan 1723 Died)
- Ercole Michele d'Aragona (12 May 1723 – 27 Sep 1734
- Marcello Filomarini (27 Sep 1734 – 13 Mar 1756 Died)
- Giuseppe Maria Carafa, C.R. (19 Jul 1756 – 10 Feb 1785 Resigned)
- Enrico Capece Minutolo, C.O. (18 Jun 1792 Confirmed – 6 May 1824 Died)

==== since 1800 ====
- Vincenzo-Maria Armentano, O.P. (12 Jul 1824 Confirmed – 15 Aug 1846 Died)
- Filippo Mincione (12 Apr 1847 Confirmed – 29 Apr 1882 Died)
- Luigi Carvelli (3 Jul 1882 – 1 Jun 1888 Died)
- Antonio Maria de Lorenzo (11 Feb 1889 – 28 Nov 1898 Resigned)
- Giuseppe Moràbito (15 Dec 1898 – 4 Jul 1922 Resigned)
- Paolo Albera (9 May 1924 – 27 Oct 1943 Died)
- Enrico Nicodemo (22 Jan 1945 – 11 Nov 1952)
- Vincenzo De Chiara (30 Apr 1953 – 5 Mar 1979 Retired)
- Domenico Tarcisio Cortese, O.F.M. (15 Jun 1979 – 28 Jun 2007 Retired)

=== Diocese of Mileto-Nicotera-Tropea ===
30 September 1986: United with the suppressed Diocese of Nicotera e Tropea

- Luigi Renzo (28 Jun 2007 – 1 Jul 2021 Resigned)
- Attilio Nostro (19 Aug 2021 – )

== See also ==
Roman Catholic Diocese of Tropea

== Bibliography ==
=== Reference works ===
- Gams, Pius Bonifatius (1873). Series episcoporum Ecclesiae catholicae: quotquot innotuerunt a beato Petro apostolo. Ratisbon: Typis et Sumptibus Georgii Josephi Manz. p. 896-897; 906; 937-938. (Use with caution; obsolete)
- Eubel, Conradus, ed. (1913). Hierarchia catholica, Tomus 1 (second ed.). Münster: Libreria Regensbergiana. p. 340-341; 366; 500. (in Latin)
- Eubel, Conradus, ed. (1914). Hierarchia catholica, Tomus 2 (second ed.). Münster: Libreria Regensbergiana. p. 192; 203; 257.
- Eubel, Conradus; Gulik, Guilelmus (1923). Hierarchia catholica, Tomus 3 (second ed.). Münster: Libreria Regensbergiana. pp. 244, 258, 319–320.
- Gauchat, Patritius (Patrice) (1935). Hierarchia catholica IV (1592-1667). Münster: Libraria Regensbergiana. p. 242; 260; 347.
- Ritzler, Remigius; Sefrin, Pirminus (1952). Hierarchia catholica medii et recentis aevi V (1667-1730). Patavii: Messagero di S. Antonio. p. 267; 289-290; 392.
- Ritzler, Remigius; Sefrin, Pirminus (1958). Hierarchia catholica medii et recentis aevi VI (1730-1799). Patavii: Messagero di S. Antonio. p. 288; 310-311; 419.
- Ritzler, Remigius; Sefrin, Pirminus (1968). Hierarchia Catholica medii et recentioris aevi sive summorum pontificum, S. R. E. cardinalium, ecclesiarum antistitum series... A pontificatu Pii PP. VII (1800) usque ad pontificatum Gregorii PP. XVI (1846) (in Latin). Vol. VII. Monasterii: Libr. Regensburgiana.
- Ritzler, Remigius; Pirminus Sefrin (1978). Hierarchia catholica Medii et recentioris aevi... A Pontificatu PII PP. IX (1846) usque ad Pontificatum Leonis PP. XIII (1903) (in Latin). Vol. VIII. Il Messaggero di S. Antonio.
- Pięta, Zenon (2002). Hierarchia catholica medii et recentioris aevi... A pontificatu Pii PP. X (1903) usque ad pontificatum Benedictii PP. XV (1922) (in Latin). Vol. IX. Padua: Messagero di San Antonio. ISBN 978-88-250-1000-8.

=== Studies ===
- Avino, Vincenzio d' (1848). Cenni storici sulle chiese arcivescovili, vescovili, e prelatizie (nullius) del regno delle due Sicilie (in Italian). Naples: dalle stampe di Ranucci. pp. 511–515.
- Capialbi, Vito (1835). Memorie per servire alla Storia della Santa Chiesa Miletese Compilate da Vito Capialbi (in Italian). Napoli: Tipogr. Porcelli.
- Cappelletti, Giuseppe (1870). Le chiese d'Italia: dalla loro origine sino ai nostri giorni (in Italian). Vol. vigesimo primo (21). Venezia: G. Antonelli. pp. 437–440.
- Luzzi, Vincenzo Maria; Caprino, Nazzarino (1989). I vescovi di Mileto (in Italian). Mileto: Pro-Loco.
- Kamp, Norbert (1975). Kirche und Monarchie im staufischen Königreich Sizilien: I. Prosopographische Grundlegung, Bistumer und Bistümer und Bischöfe des Konigreichs 1194–1266: 2. Apulien und Calabrien München: Wilhelm Fink 1975.
- Kehr, Paulus Fridolin (1975). Italia pontificia. Regesta pontificum Romanorum. Vol. X: Calabria–Insulae. Berlin: Weidmann. (in Latin)
- Taccone-Gallucci, Domenico (1881). Monografia della città e diocesi di Mileto (in Italian). Napoli: tip. degli Accattoncelli.
- Ughelli, Ferdinando; Coleti, Nicolò (1717). Italia sacra: sive De episcopis Italiae et insularum adjacentium (in Latin). Vol. Tomus primus (second ed.). Venice: apud Sebastianum Coleti. pp. 942–961.
