= Crapolla =

Crapolla is a natural fjord in the area of Torca, a frazione of Massa Lubrense in the province of Naples, Italy. It was once used as a natural port.

Nowadays a little fishermen's village can be seen, as well as St. Peter's Chapel (11th century), part of an abbey. Traces of ancient Roman dwellings can be seen in the area.
