= Herradón de Pinares =

- Municipality
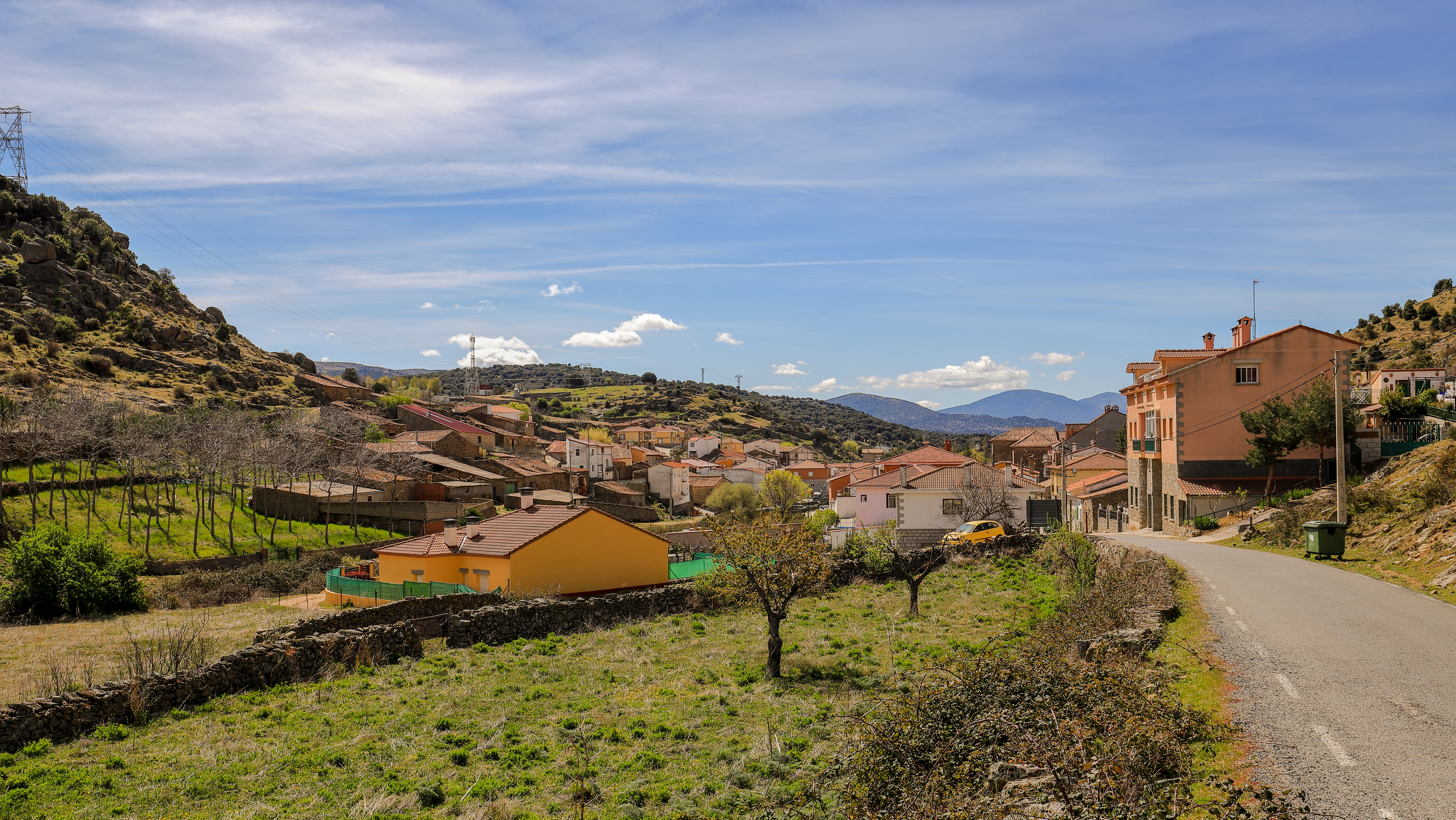
- Flag Coat of arms
- Location in Spain. Herradón de Pinares (Castile and León)
- Coordinates: 40°33′48″N 4°33′30″W
- Country: Spain
- Autonomous community: Castile and León
- Province: Ávila
- Municipality: Herradón de Pinares

Area
  - Total: 48 km^{2} (19 sq mi)

Population (2025-01-01)
  - Total: 526
  - Density: 11/km^{2} (28/sq mi)
- Time zone: UTC+1 (CET)
  - Summer (DST): UTC+2 (CEST)
- Website: Official website

Herradón de Pinares is a municipality located in the province of Ávila, Castile and León, Spain.

== Population ==
Historical population
Year	Pop.	±% p.a.
2023	487	—
2024	495	+1.64%
2025	526	+6.26%
Source: INE
