= Massa Lubrense =

Massa Lubrense Massa (Neapolitan)
- Comune
- Comune di Massa Lubrense
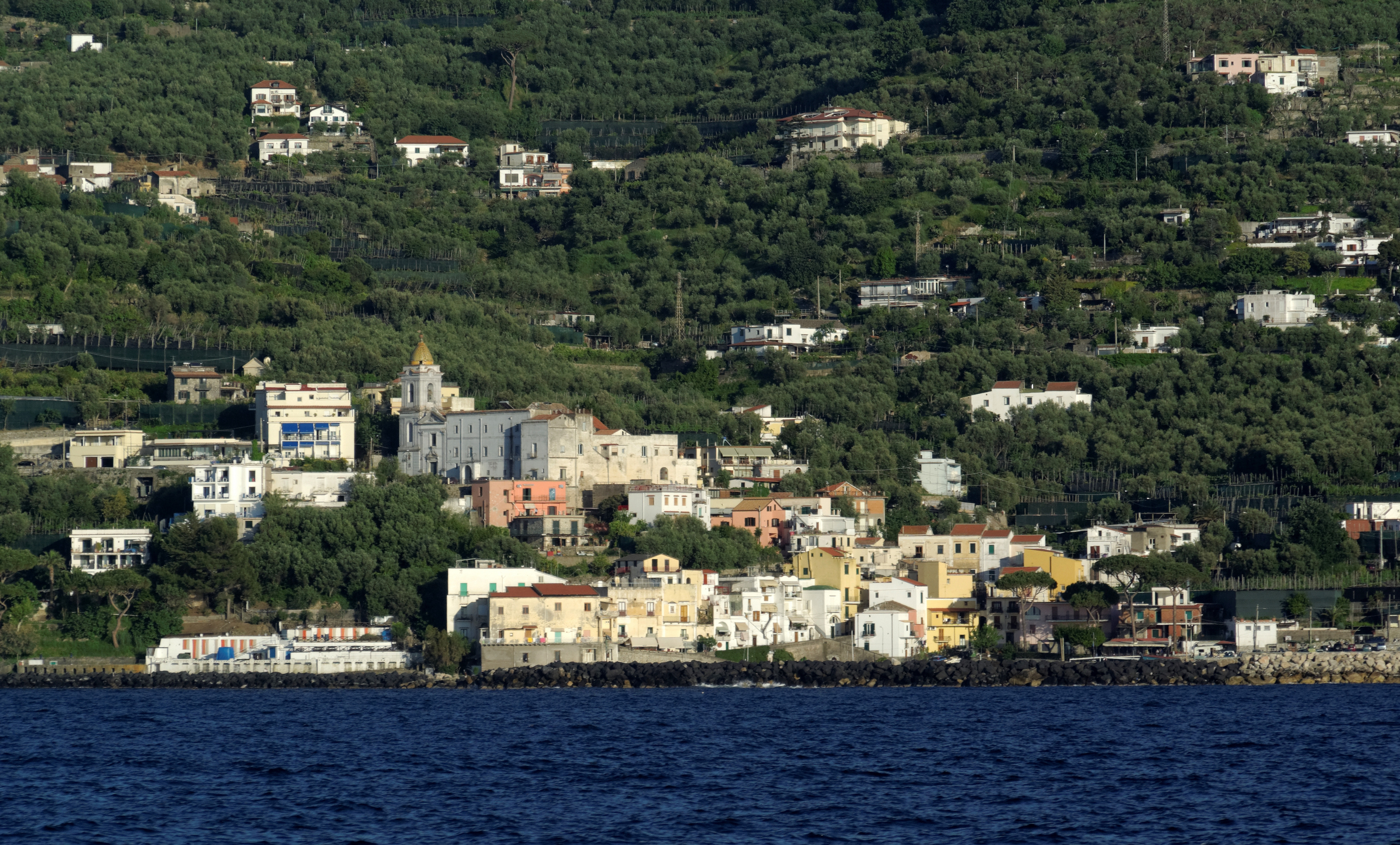

- Location within Italy Location within Campania
- Coordinates: 40°36′40″N 14°20′41″E
- Country: Italy
- Region: Campania
- Metropolitan city: Naples (NA)
- Frazioni: Acquara, Annunziata, Casa, Marciano, Marina del Cantone, Marina della Lobra, Marina di Puolo, Metrano, Monticchio, Nerano, Pastena, San Francesco, Sant'Agata sui Due Golfi, Santa Maria, Santa Maria della Neve, Schiazzano, Termini, Torca

Area
  - Total: 19.7 km^{2} (7.6 sq mi)

Population (Dec. 2017)
  - Total: 14,236
  - Density: 723/km^{2} (1,870/sq mi)
- Time zone: UTC+1 (CET)
  - Summer (DST): UTC+2 (CEST)
- Postal code: 80061 Massa Lubrense; 80060 Monticchio; 80064 Sant'Agata; 80068 Termini
- Dialing code: 081

Massa Lubrense (Neapolitan: Massa) is a comune (municipality) in the Metropolitan City of Naples in the Italian region of Campania, located about 25 kilometres (16 mi) southeast of Naples. As of 31 December 2004, it had a population of 13,404 and an area of 19.7 km^{2} (7.6 sq mi).

== Geography ==
The municipality of Massa Lubrense contains the frazioni (subdivisions, mainly villages and hamlets) of Acquara, Annunziata, Casa, Marciano, Marina del Cantone, Marina della Lobra, Marina di Puolo, Metrano, Monticchio, Nerano, Pastena, San Francesco, Sant'Agata sui Due Golfi (location of the fjord Crapolla), Santa Maria della Neve, Schiazzano, Termini and Torca.

Massa Lubrense borders only with the municipality of Sorrento.

== Demographic evolution ==
Historical population

Year	Pop.	±%
1861	8,162	—
1871	8,609	+5.5%
1881	8,185	−4.9%
1901	8,010	−2.1%
1911	8,160	+1.9%

Year	Pop.	±%
1921	8,725	+6.9%
1931	8,670	−0.6%
1936	8,769	+1.1%
1951	8,965	+2.2%
1961	9,158	+2.2%

Year	Pop.	±%
1971	9,621	+5.1%
1981	10,476	+8.9%
1991	12,029	+14.8%
2001	12,880	+7.1%

Source: Data from ISTAT

== Gallery ==
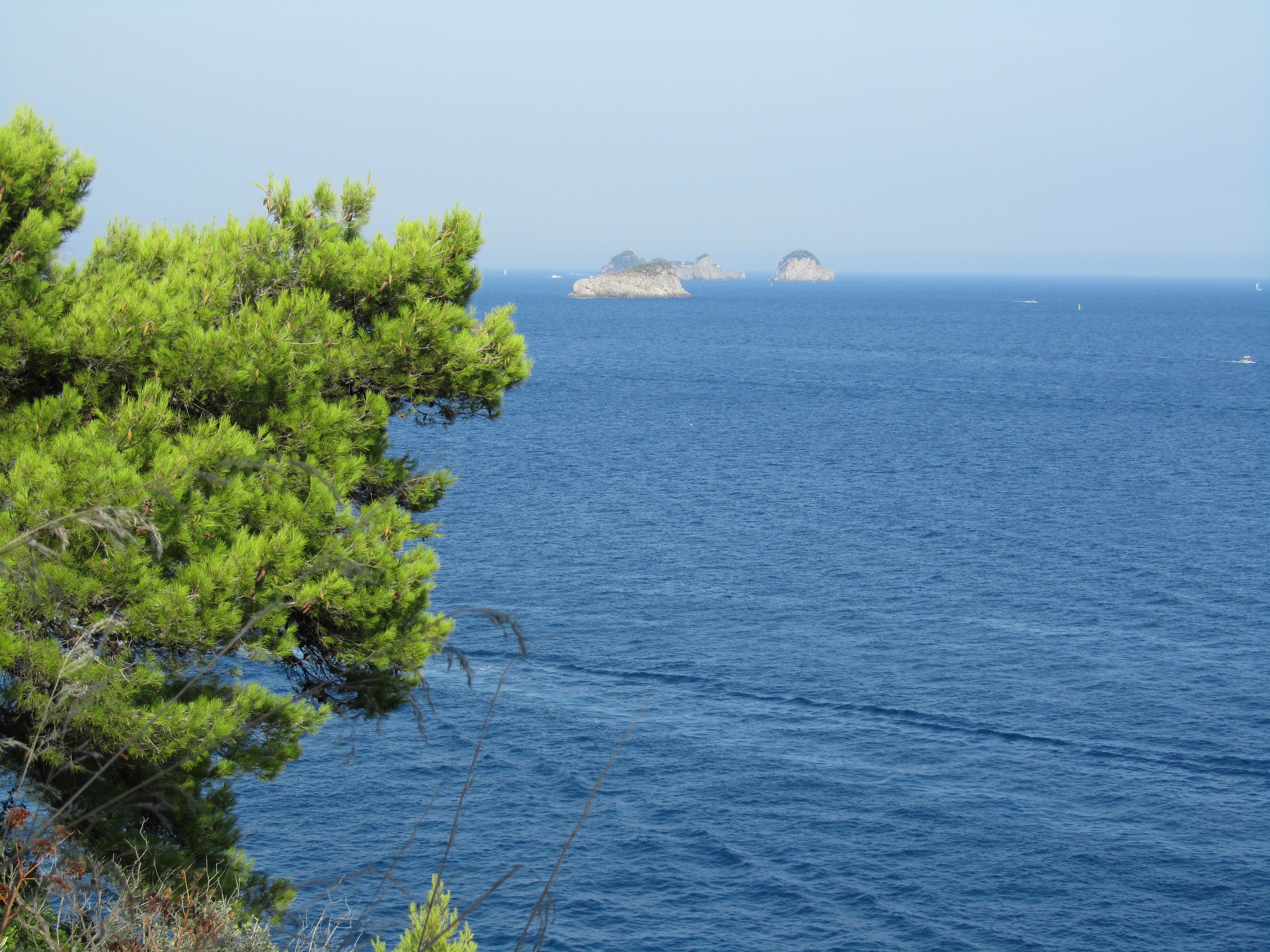

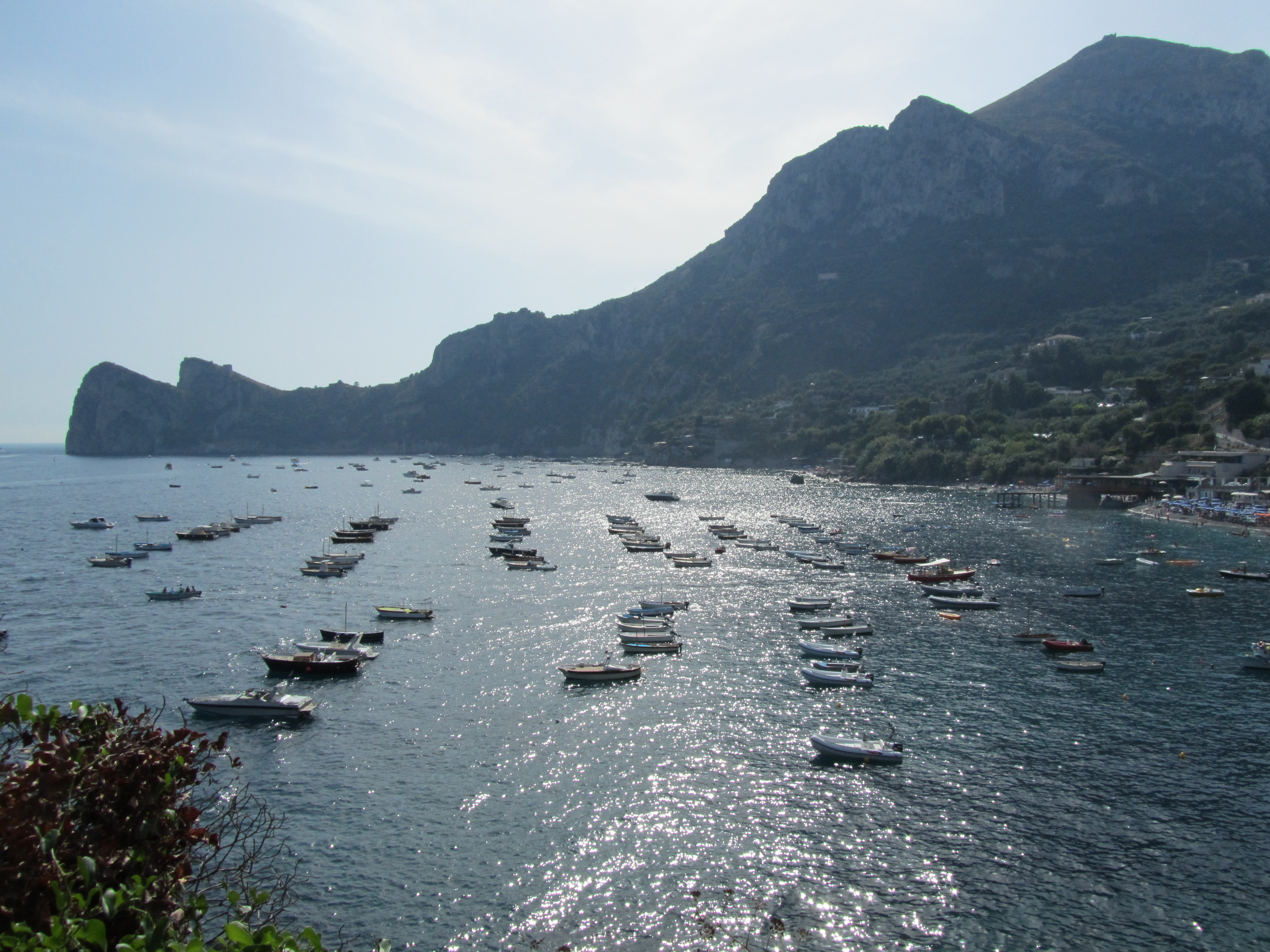

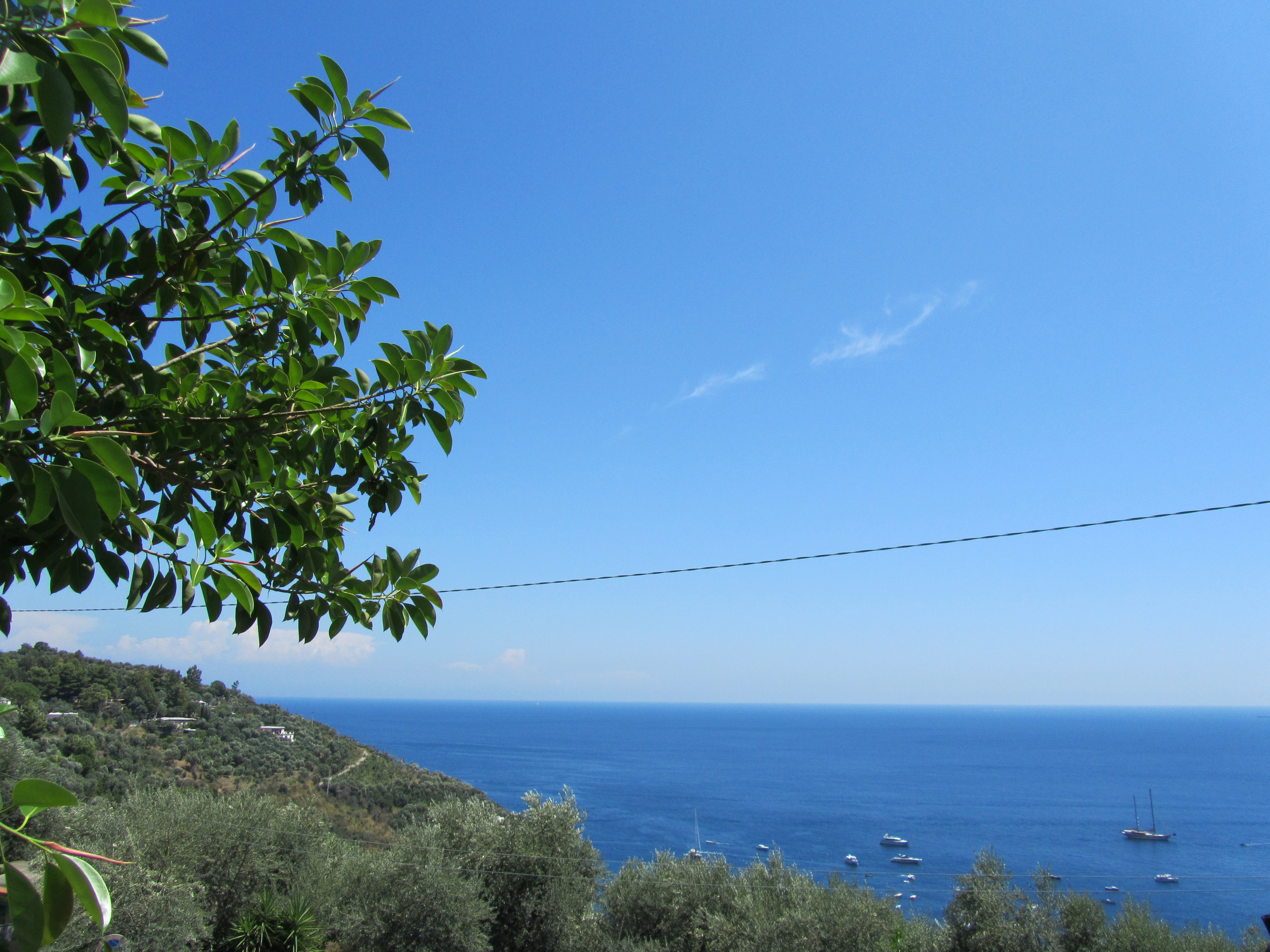

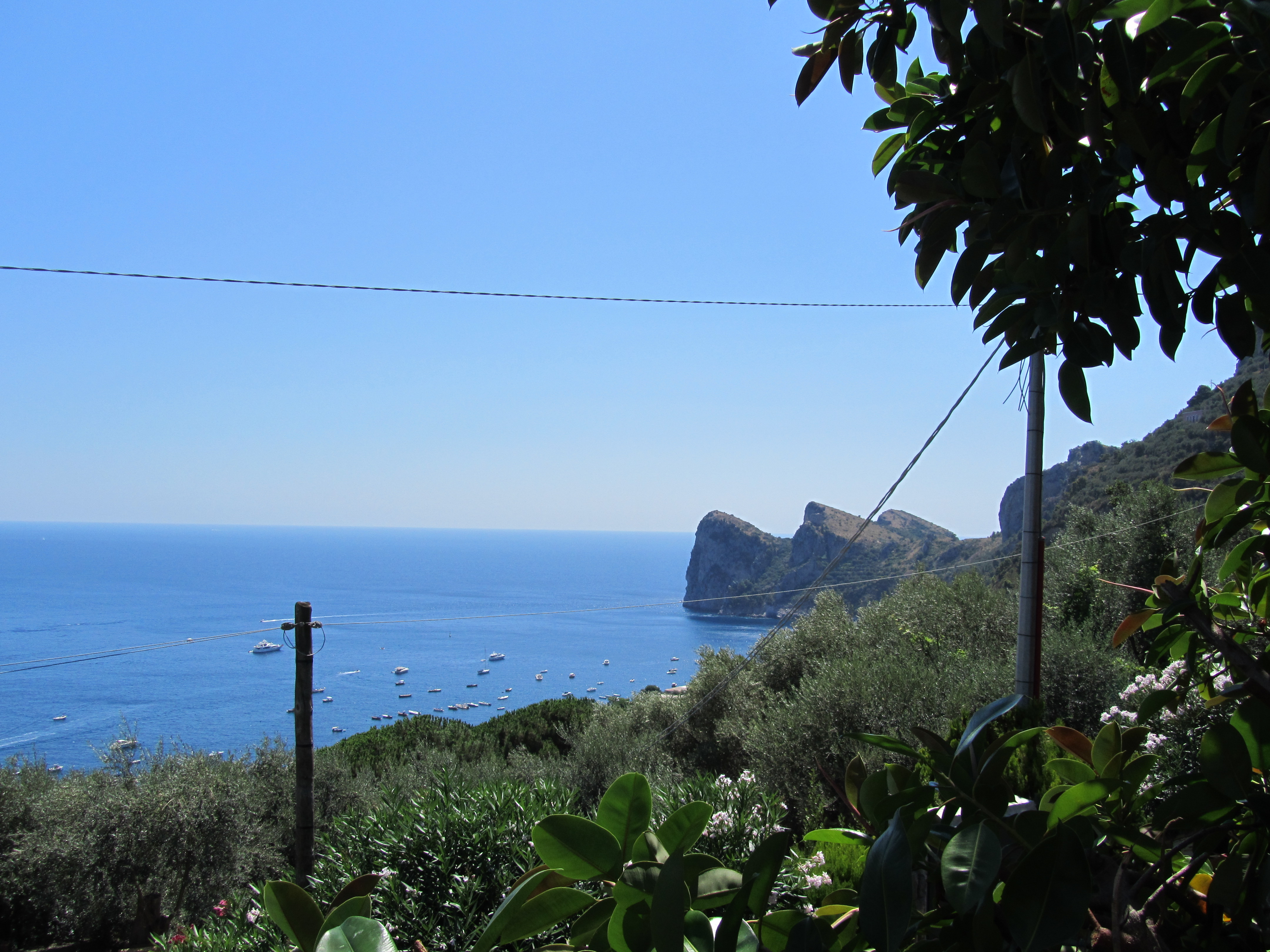

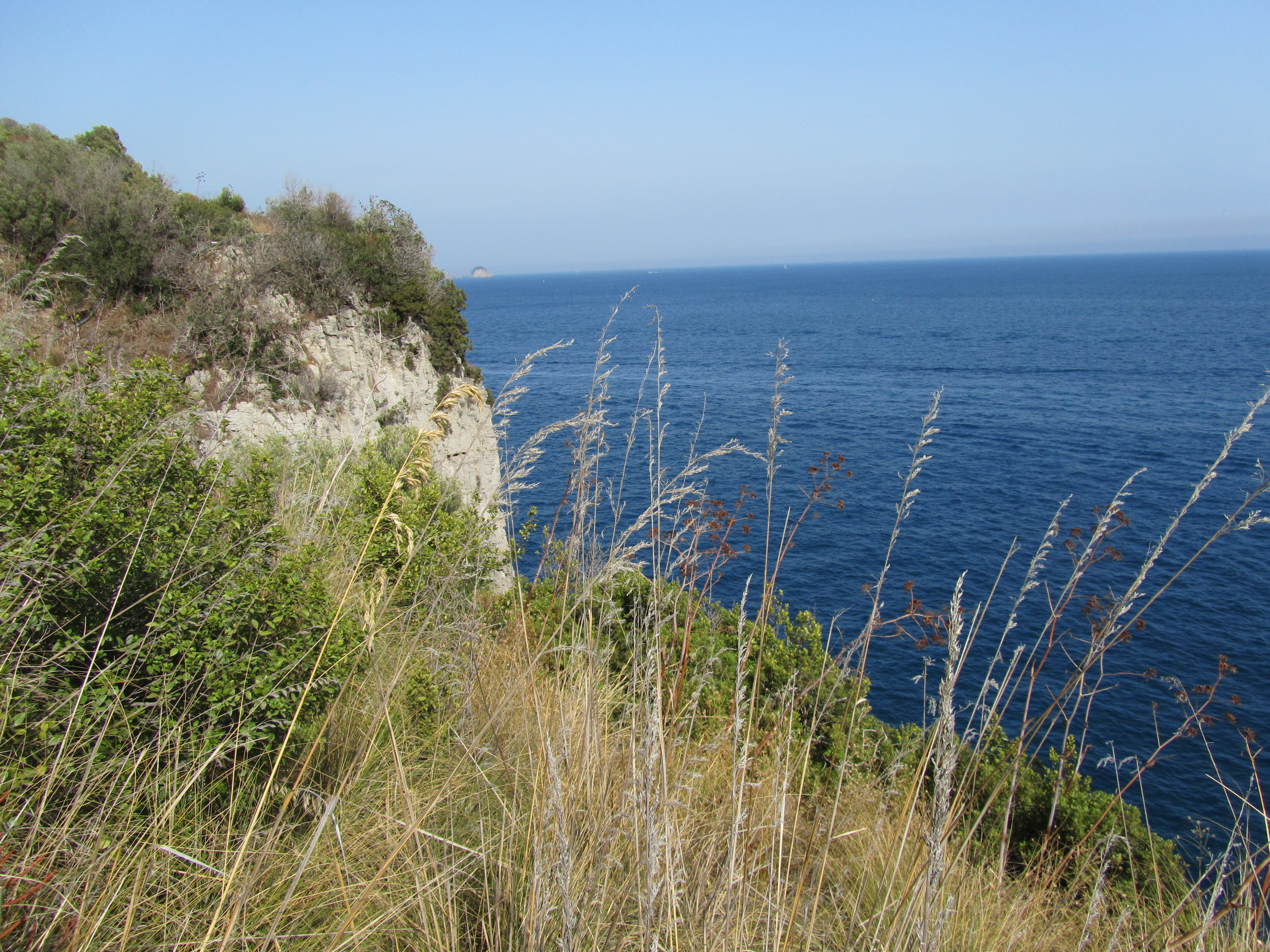

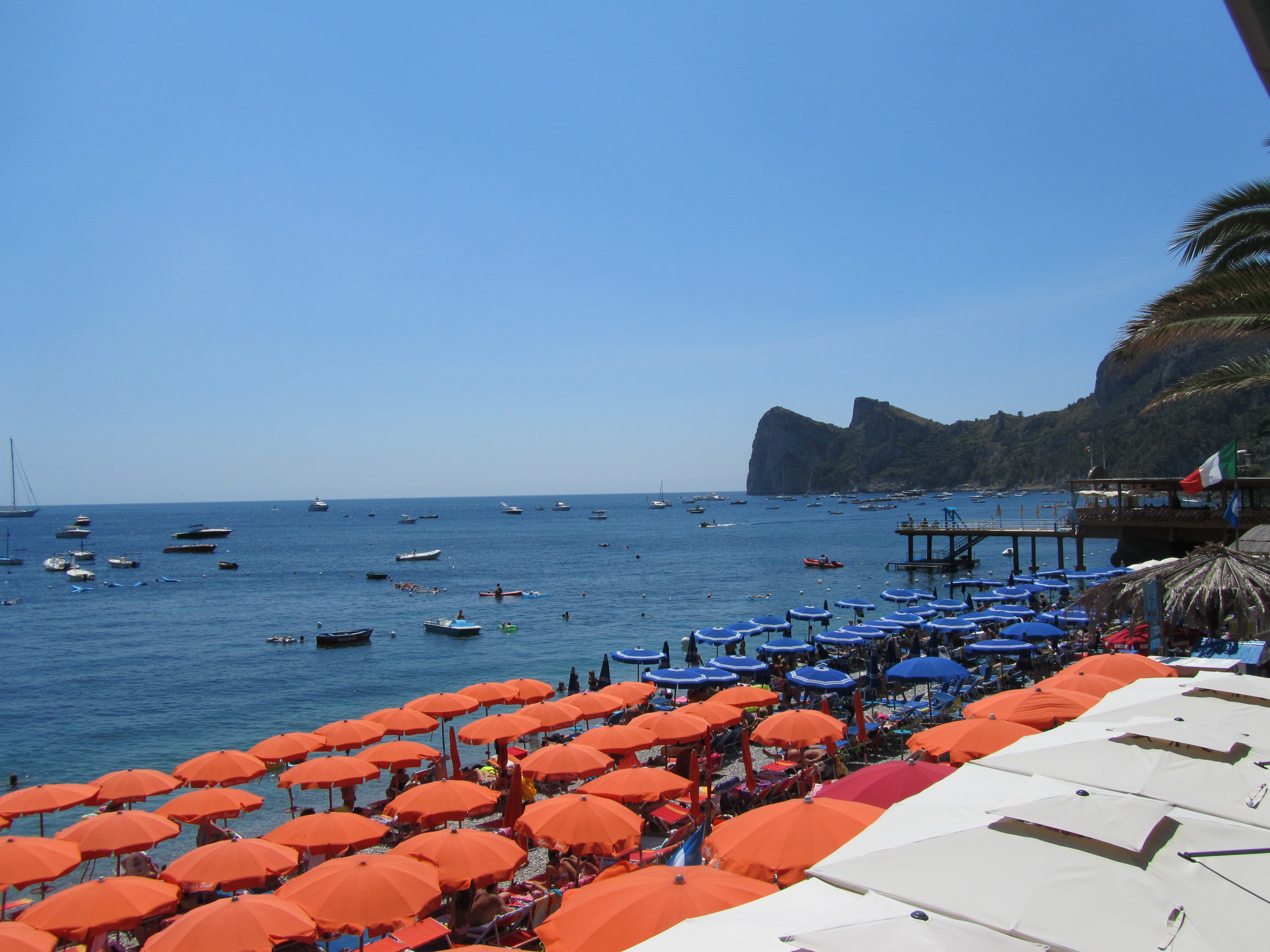

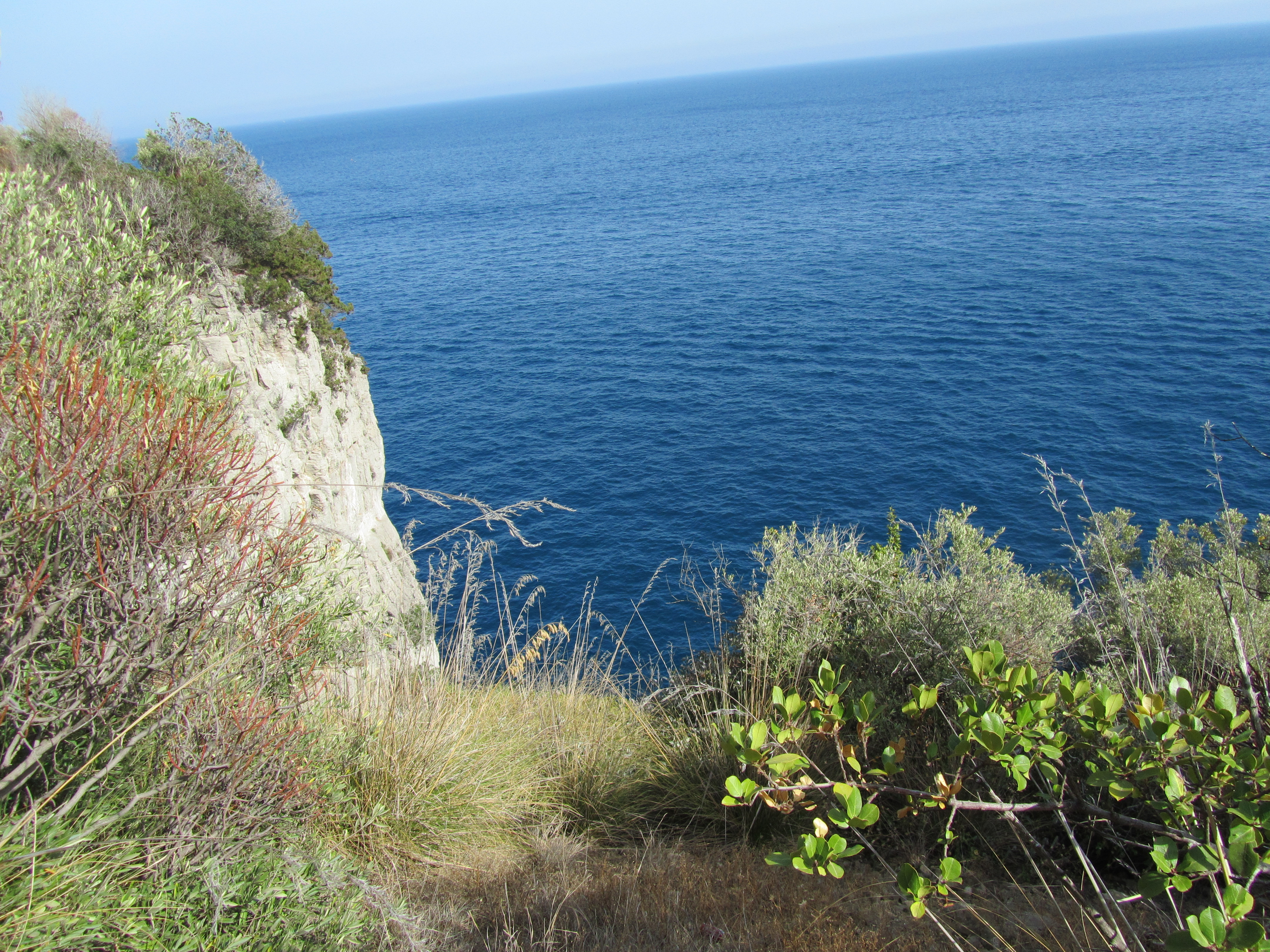

== See also ==
- Sorrentine Peninsula
- Amalfi Coast
