= 2017 Zadar flash flood =

Flood in Zadar, Croatia

On 11 September 2017, the Croatian city of Zadar and the surrounding area were affected by a mesoscale convective system producing extreme rainfall, which caused a flash flood. Around 300 millimetres (12 in) of rain, threefold the monthly average for September, was recorded during 24 hours on 10–11 September. Nearly 190 mm (7.5 in) fell in the space of two hours in the morning of 11 September. Outside Zadar, flooding occurred in Sali and Sukošan. The town of Nin was the worst hit, as the floodwaters overwhelmed its embankment, and a state of emergency was declared there. There were no fatalities. The flood caused an estimated 322 million Croatian kuna in damage (€43 million). Numerous houses, apartments and institutions were damaged, including Zadar cemetery, hospitals, roads and a shopping mall. The torrent damaged the frame of an apartment complex in construction. The roads Zadar–Ražanac and Poljica-Brig – Nin were washed out. Zadar's water treatment plant suffered 10 million kuna in damage, while the cost to repair roads was estimated to be over 4 million kuna. The salt ponds in Nin lost the year's salt harvest to the flood.

The rainfall and flooding was caused by the terrain surrounding the city. Zadar, a coastal city, lies in the flat region of Ravni Kotari. However, the Velebit mountain range extends along the coast behind Ravni Kotari, and caused the storms arriving from Tyrrhenian Sea in the west to undergo orographic lift and continually produce rain while passing over Zadar. The mesoscale convective system responsible for the flood spanned over 400 kilometres (250 mi) east–west, and reached a temperature of −65 °C (−85 °F) at the cloud tops. Over 25,000 lightning strikes were recorded near Zadar. 285 mm (11.2 in) of rain fell in Zadar proper, while 325 mm (12.8 in) was recorded in nearby Zemunik. While the rainfall amount was extremely high, it did not break Zemunik's daily record of 352.2 mm (13.87 in), which was set during the flood of 11 September 1986.

On 11 September 2017, Zadar was pronounced to have recorded the most rainfall of all meteorological stations on earth for this date, beating out rainfall totals caused by Hurricane Irma in Florida, while Gospić was placed 8th. However, the data was later corrected to include a higher total for Alabat Island, Philippines, due to Tropical Storm Maring.
