= Grbe =

Grbe may refer to:

- Grbe, Montenegro, a village near Danilovgrad
- Grbe, Croatia, a village near Nin
