= History of the Croatian Navy =

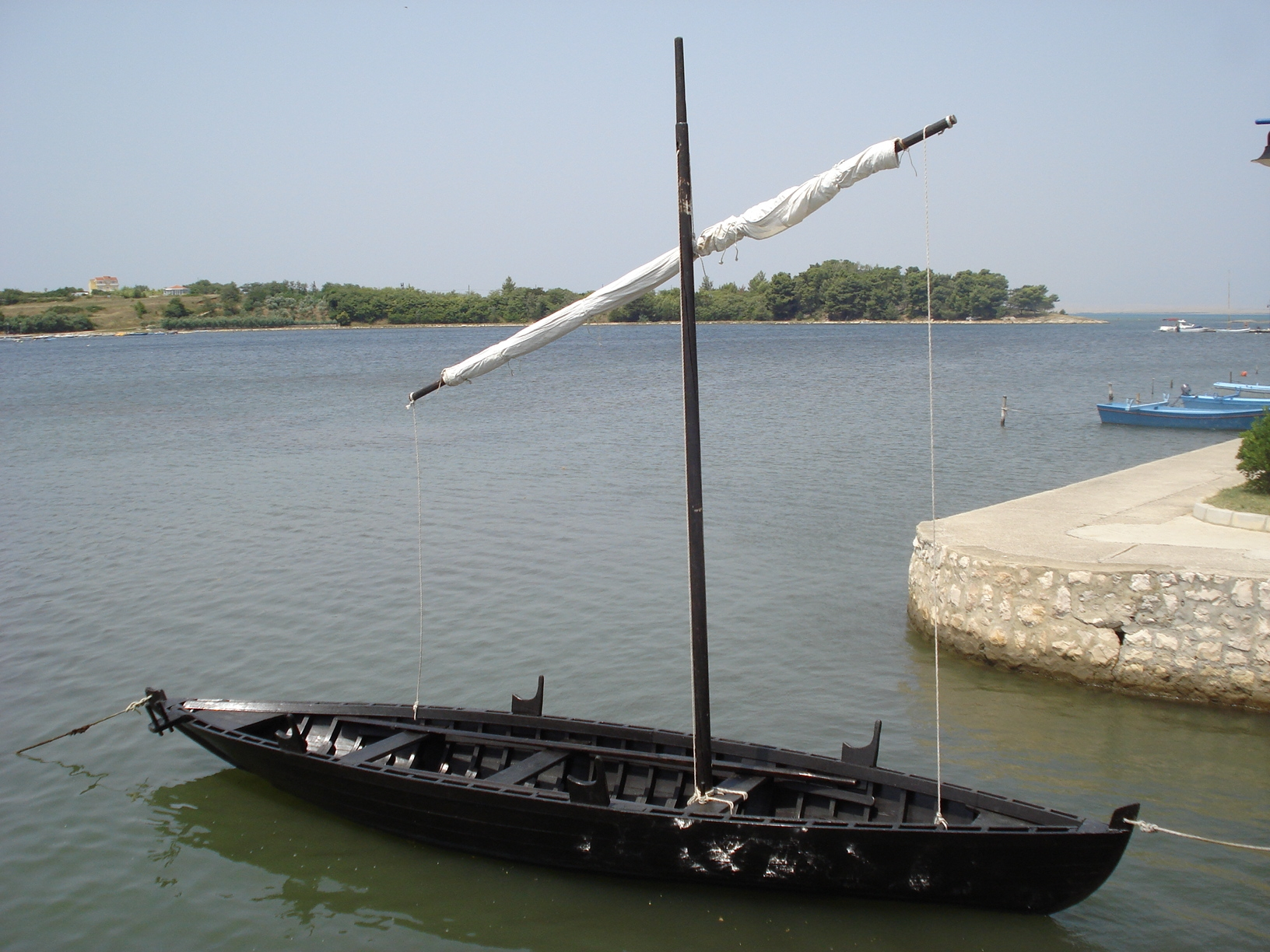
A replica of Croatian 11th century small ship called kondura.

The history of the Croatian Navy can be traced from the Middle Ages until modern times.

== Early history ==
At the time of Duke Branimir (879–892) a Croatian fleet participated in the battle against the Venetians, who were completely defeated on 18 September 887, and in which the Doge Pietro I Candiano was killed. Between 887 and 948, no new war was recorded between Venice and the Croats, which assumed that Venetians paid tribute to maintain the peace.

In the work of Constantine Porphyrogenitus, De administrando imperio it is stated that Croatia, during the reign of King Tomislav had 80 sagenas (larger ships with 40 sailors) and 100 konduras (smaller ships with 10 to 20 sailors, not counting oarsmen). The era of King Stjepan Držislav (969–996) was marked with successful maritime trade and safekeeping of maritime routes and domination of Croatia on the eastern coast of the Adriatic Sea.

The King of Croatia and Dalmatia Petar Krešimir IV (1058–1074) expanded its kingdom "on land and on sea". In his deed of donation to the convent of Saint Krševan in Zadar in 1069, it is stated that he donated the island of Maun, situated "in our Dalmatian sea" (in nostro dalmatico mari). The Duke of the Croatian Royal Navy, Rusin, is mentioned at the time and the fact that the very title of Duke could be borne only by governmental dignitaries is proof of the navy importance.

In the first year of the rule of King Dmitar Zvonimir (1074–1089) Normans invaded the Adriatic Sea. As Normans ally, Dmitar Zvonimir joined in wars against Byzantium. When Robert Guiscard, Duke of Apulia, invaded the western Balkan provinces of the empire in 1084, Zvonimir sent his fleet to his aid.

Normans conquered cities on the eastern coast. The only detail that is certain is that the island of Rab never fell. The alliance of Normans and Croats made under the influence of the Pope Gregory VII lasted from 1082 to 1084: they led together a series of naval battles against Byzantine-Venetian navy.

During the period of personal union with Kingdom of Hungary, the Croatian coast fell under Venice and its naval power deteriorated. But this is the time when the fleet of the Republic of Dubrovnik, which kept its independence, started to rise.

== Modern history ==
=== Napoleonic Wars ===
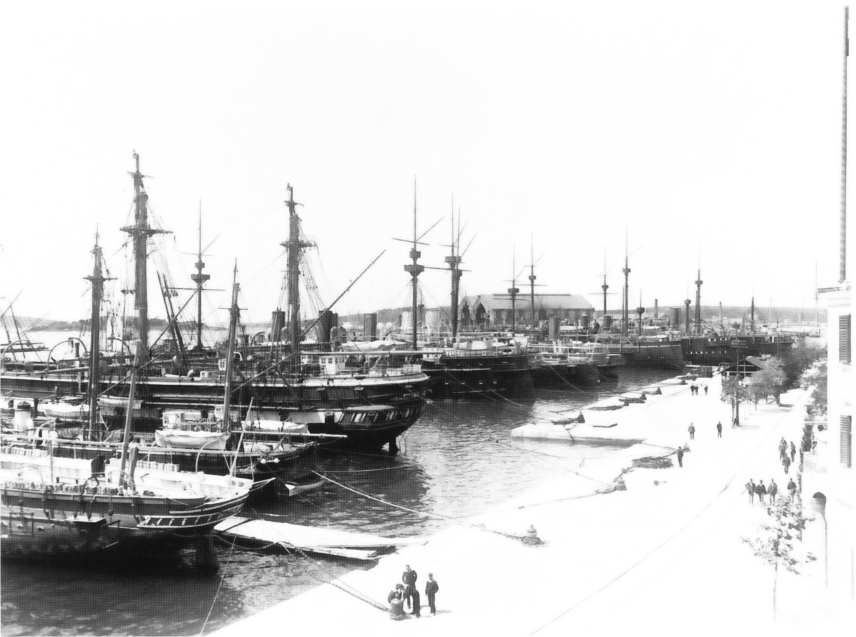
Naval base at Pula

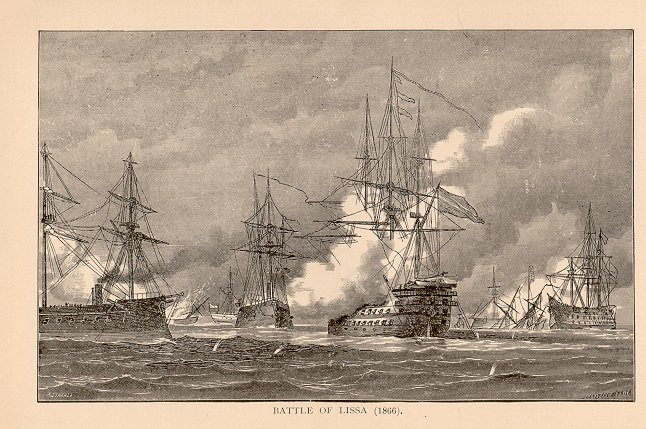
Battle of Lissa

The independence of Dubrovnik was also kept during Napoleonic Wars which shows its strength and effective diplomacy. But the strength of the Republic of Ragusa was also manifested in its maritime power. The size of the Fleet of Dubrovnik in 1800, together with fishing ships, was 673 clippers. 255 of them were bigger ships that sailed outside the territorial waters of Dubrovnik. The total number of transatlantic clippers was 230 ships. The Republic had its consulates in over 80 cities. At that time, Dubrovnik had about 7,000 seamen, shipbuilders, shipowners and members of other maritime professions.

The period from 1806 to 1813 was the era of the French rule of Marshal Marmont in Dalmatia and development of maritime trade. Napoleon's rule of Dalmatia was followed by Austro-Hungarian rule and on 2 November 1818 the first steam ship Carolina sailed the Adriatic Sea. In early 1838 the free steamship navigation in the Adriatic Sea with regular steamship route Triest-Mali Lošinj-Zadar-Šibenik-Split-Hvar-Korčula-Dubrovnik-Kotor was proclaimed. This year was also marked with cessation of the domination of the clippers and entrance of steamship in the war fleet.

=== Austro-Hungary ===
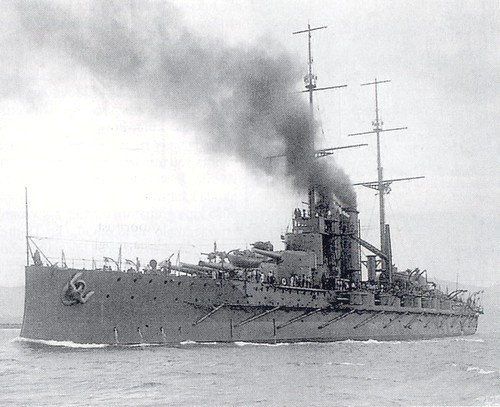
Viribus Unitis

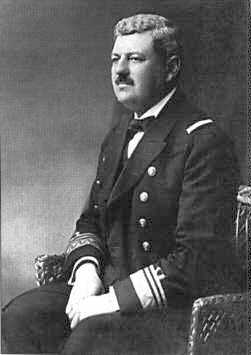
Admiral Janko Vuković

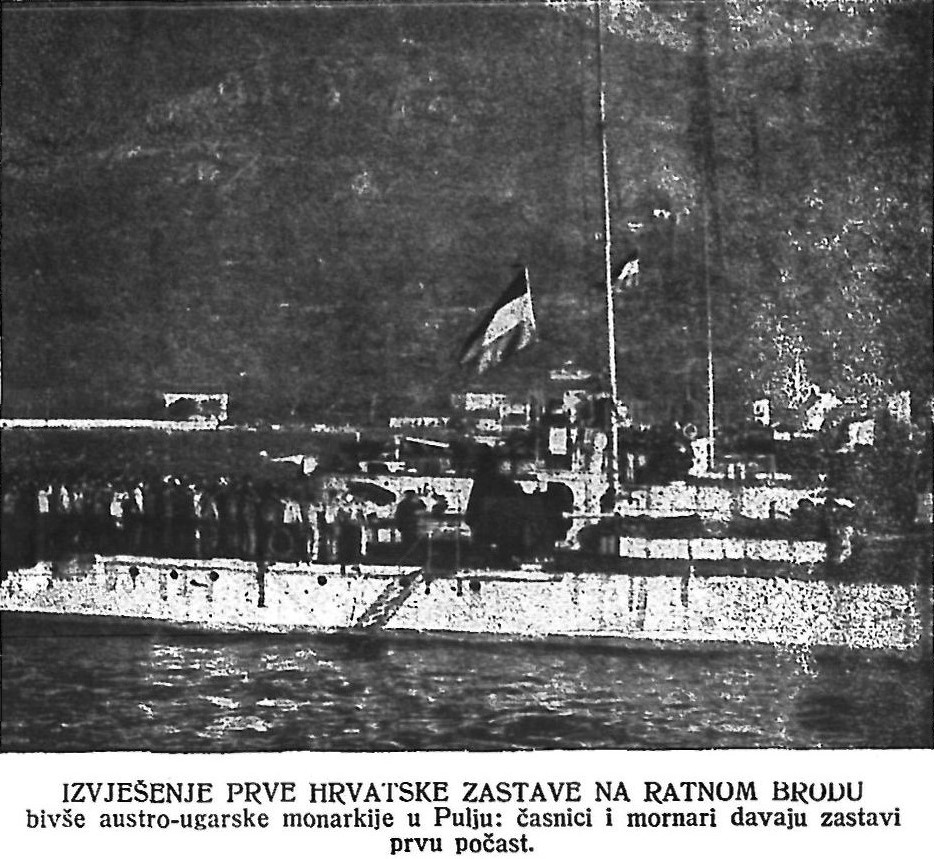
First Croatian flag ever hoisted on a naval ship, Pula, 31 October 1918, with the crews saluting the flag.

In June 1866, the Italian King Victor Emanuel II declared war on Austria (as they had many times before the Adriatic Sea was a battlefield). Both fleets fought on 20 September opening fierce artillery fire. Wilhelm von Tegetthoff, a commander of the Austrian fleet sails into the harbour of Vis with all gunboats. With victory in Battle of Lissa (Vis) Austria secured dominance on the Adriatic Sea. In 1866, a Croatian officer in the Austro-Hungarian Navy, Ivan Lupis, together with Robert Whitehead, constructed the first self-propelled torpedo in Rijeka.

In 1869, the Austrian frigate SMS Donau undertook a trip around the world. Donau displaced 2000 tons and carried 350 crew members who were sailors from islands and coast of the Eastern Adriatic, mostly Croats. The ship left Pula in July and returned in March 1871 having sailed the whole Earth. There is a ship log written by a crewmember, Matija Politeo from Stari Grad on the island of Hvar.

The period from 1911 to 1914 was especially important for the development of the Austro-Hungarian Navy in which most of the crew consisted of Croats. The biggest ships of Austro-Hungarian Navy were launched at that time: SMS Viribus Unitis, SMS Tegetthoff, SMS Prinz Eugen and SMS Szent István. This is also the period in which we can find Croats as high-ranking officers, like admiral Maximilian Njegovan (Commander-in-Chief of the Navy, 1917–1918) or admiral Janko Vuković (commander of SMS Viribus Unitis).

=== Post WWI ===
After the end of World War I, in 1918 the Austro-Hungarian navy on the admiral ship SMS Viribus Unitis in Pula was forced, under order of the Emperor Charles I of Austria, to surrender to delegates of the National Council of Slovenes, Croats and Serbs from Zagreb - Ante Tresić Pavičić, Vilim Bukšeg and Ivan Čop and members of the Local National Council in Pula. The Croatian flag was flown then. On the very same day a specially designed Italian craft called a mignatta ("leech"), similar to a guided torpedo, broke through the harbour of Pula and sank the battleship Viribus Unitis together with 250 sailors and Commander Janko Vuković. (see Raid on Pula)

=== Yugoslavia ===
The navy and merchant navy led by Croatian maritime experts continued to develop at the time of the Kingdom of Yugoslavia and later in socialist Yugoslavia. During this period, many Croats took over high duties in Yugoslav Navy whose main bases were on the territory of Croatia.

=== Modern Croatia ===
During the breakdown of Yugoslavia in 1991, by decree of the Croatian President on 12 September 1991, the new Croatian Navy was born. The first Navy commander appointed was admiral Sveto Letica. The first ship in the naval fleet was landing craft nº 103, but soon Croatia gained possession of at least 34 ex-ships of the Yugoslav navy, captured during the battle of Šibenik. A flotilla of three naval trawlers and fishing boats had been already established in Kali, Ugljan island, under the operational command of the Croatian Army's 112th Brigade on 21 August 1991. Members of this unit, after landing from a motorboat and a sailboat, the Maša and the Nirvana, disabled the Yugoslav Mirna-class patrol boat Biokovo with a Malyutka antitank missile fired from a cove at Škarda island. They also occluded the Pasman channel by unfolding tuna nets. Sources from the 112th Brigade's flotilla put this action on 10 September 1991. Biokovo was later captured by the Croatian Navy at and commissioned as PBR 61 Novigrad. Another notable action of the brand new Croatian Navy at the time was the unsuccessful ambush on the Yugoslav frigate Split by the torpedo boat TB-51 Vukovar (former TČ-222, captured at Šibenik) on the night of 10 October 1991. Under the command of Frigate Lieutenant Vojko Marelić, Vukovar launched eight torpedoes to Split, using the island of Čiovo as a radar mask to evade detection. All the torpedoes missed their target. The main fleet was established on 24 September, consisting of six ships.

- List of Croatian warships (as of 24 September 1991)
  - RTOP-402 - later Šibenik (RTOP-21)
  - TČ-222 - later TB-51 Vukovar
  - RČ-301 - later OBM 41 Dubrovnik
  - PČ-171 - later OB-63 Novigrad
  - PČ-180 - later OB-63 Cavtat
  - PČ-181 - later OB-64 Hrvatska Kostajnica

Two other warships captured by Croatia, the Osa I class RČ-310 Velimir Škorpik and the Shershen class TČ-219 Streljko were not regarded as seaworthy and were eventually sunk by the missile boats Kralj Petar Krešimir IV and OBM-41 Dubrovnik in October 1994, during a live firing exercise known as Operation Posejdon. The main actions of the new Croatian navy during the war of independence were the lifting of the Yugoslav blockade of Dalmatia and the relief of Dubrovnik.

== See also ==
- List of admirals of Croatia
