= Church of St. Nicholas, Nin =

Church of Saint Nicholas
- Croatian: Crkva svetog Nikole
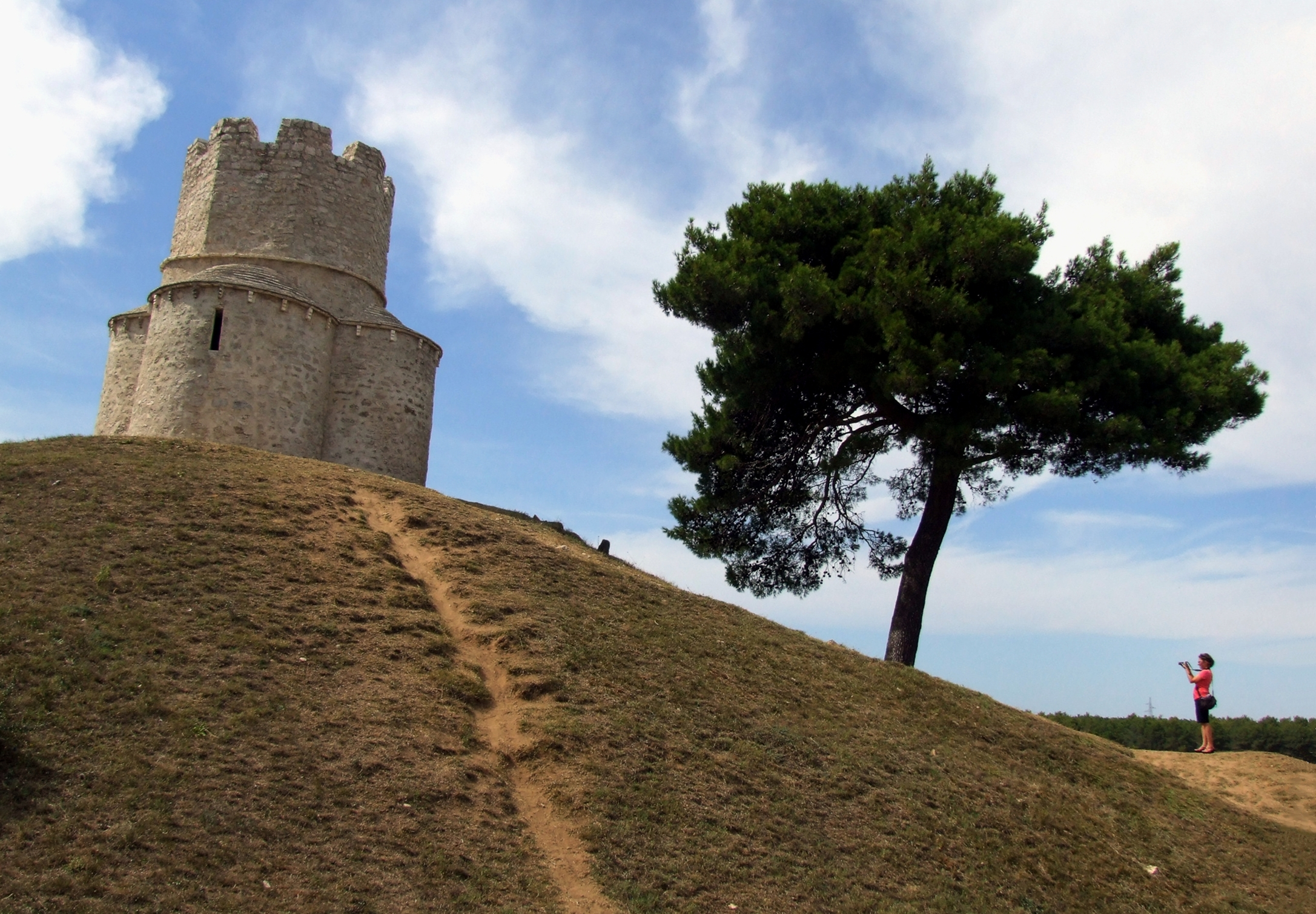
- Church of Saint Nicholas
- 44.231°N 15.178°E
- Location: Nin
- Country: Croatia
- Denomination: Roman Catholic

Architecture
- Functional status: Active
- Style: Pre-Romanesque
- Years built: 12th century AD

Specifications
- Length: 5.90 metres (232 in)
- Width: 5.70 metres (224 in)
- Height: 6 metres (240 in)
- Materials: Stone

Administration
- Archdiocese: Zadar

Clergy
- Priest

Cultural Good of Croatia
- Type: Protected cultural good
- Reference no.: Z-1336

The Church of St. Nicholas (Croatian: Crkva svetog Nikole) is a late 11th or early 12th century Pre-Romanesque style Roman Catholic church located in the field of Prahulje, one mile from Zadar, between Zaton and Nin in Croatia. It was built on the earthen pyramid mound on top of the Liburnian prehistoric tomb.

The church is the only surviving example of early Romanesque architecture in all of Dalmatia. It is dedicated to Saint Nicholas.

== Description ==
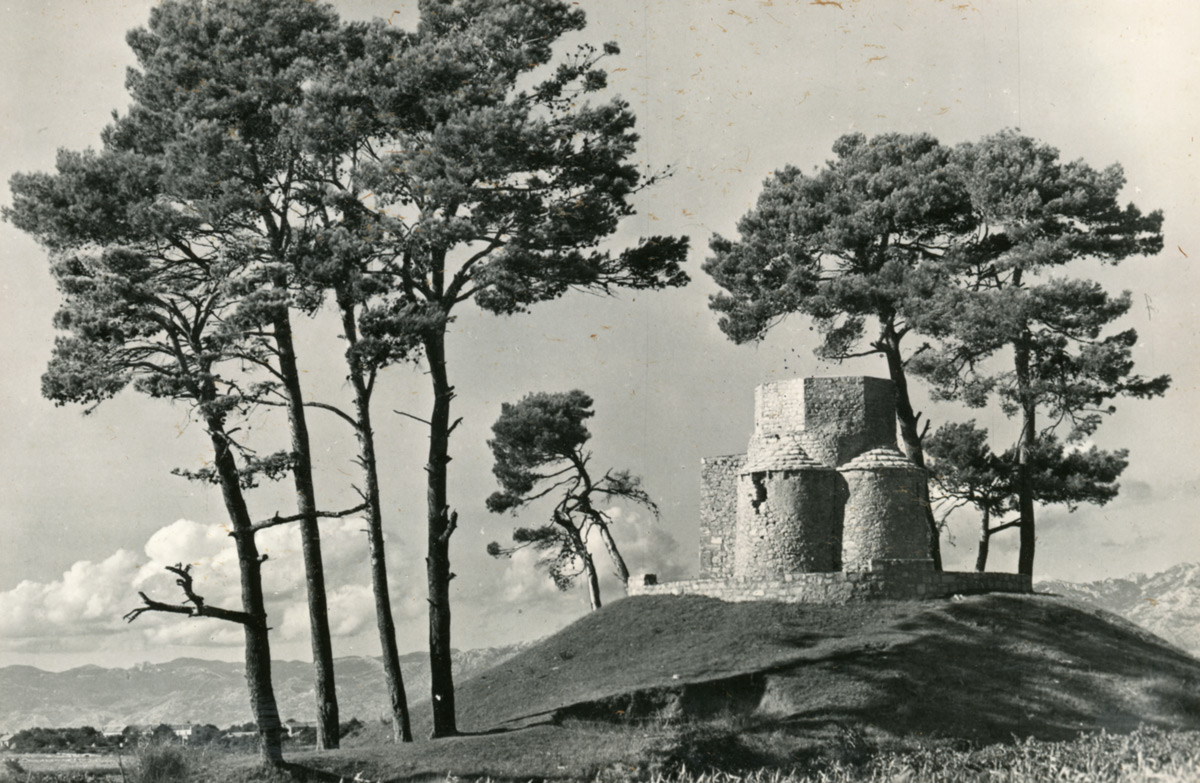
Old photograph of St. Nicholas Church.

The Church of St. Nicholas was built in form of a fortress. It has a trefoil plan with four branches arranged around a central circular core, three of which form the apse, and the fourth the input branch. Its dome-shaped vault is reinforced with circular-ribbed arches above which 8 small towers with battlement as a lookout were built in the 16th or 17th century during Hundred Years' Croatian–Ottoman War. Flanges that are resting on pilasters that are abutting onto the pylons between the apses are placed under the dome. Input branch is rectangular and roofed with a mezzanine leaning on squinch, while three other branches of semicircular conch are translated with semi calotte. The church was built of small stones and has a smooth outer surface. It has very small dimensions; length: 5.90m, width: 5.70m, height= 6m.

== Visit of Priul in 1603 ==
In 1603, Church of St. Nicholas was visited by Priul who found neatly kept Glagolitic registers of baptisms and marriages, as well as two Glagolitic missals. At the time of his visit, Brotherhood of the Holy Spirit with 28 members was active in the parish. Priul ordered brotherhood to write its rules that had to be approved by the local bishop.

== Usage ==
Church of St Nicholas from a kite

Since the Church was constructed, Mass was celebrated in it on the feast of St. Nicholas on December 6. In recent times, Mass is celebrated on the day of Saint Mark on April 25.

== See also ==
- Nin, Croatia
- Architecture of Croatia
- Church of St. Donatus
- Church of the Holy Cross, Nin
- Church of Holy Salvation, Cetina
