= Žerava =

Settlement in Zadar County, Croatia

- Settlement
- Interactive map of Žerava
- Location within Croatia
- Coordinates: 44°12′15″N 15°15′16″E
- Country: Croatia
- County: Zadar County
- City: Nin

Area
  - Total: 6.3 km^{2} (2.4 sq mi)

Population (2021)
  - Total: 192
  - Density: 30/km^{2} (79/sq mi)
- Time zone: UTC+1 (CET)
  - Summer (DST): UTC+2 (CEST)
- Postal code: 23235 Vrsi
- Area code: +385 (0)23

Žerava is a settlement in the City of Nin in Croatia. In 2021, its population was 192.

== Demographics ==
Žerava: Population trends 2011–2021
v

population	208	192
	2011	2021

Sources: Croatian Bureau of Statistics publications
