= Ninski Stanovi =

- Village
- Location within Croatia
- Coordinates: 44°13′5″N 15°13′0″E
- Country: Croatia
- County: Zadar County
- Municipality: Nin

Area
  - Total: 7.5 sq mi (19.3 km^{2})

Population (2021)
  - Total: 340
  - Density: 46/sq mi (18/km^{2})
- Time zone: UTC+1 (CET)
  - Summer (DST): UTC+2 (CEST)

Ninski Stanovi is a village in Croatia.
