= Church of the Holy Cross, Nin =

Coordinates: 44°14′35″N 15°11′04″E

Church of the Holy Cross
- Crkva svetog Križa
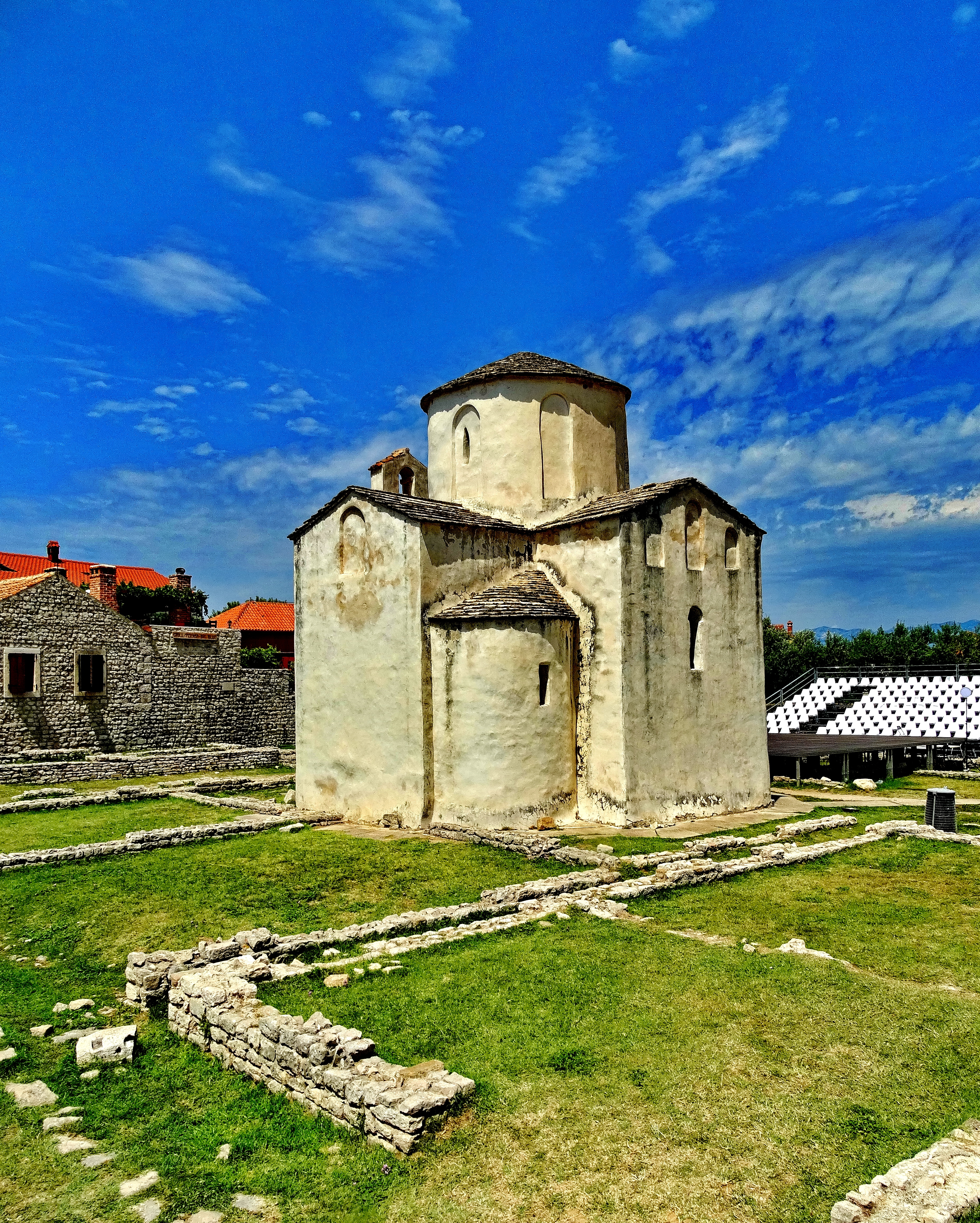
- Church of the Holy Cross
- Location: Nin, Croatia
- Denomination: Roman Catholic

Architecture
- Style: Pre-Romanesque
- Completed: 9th century

Church of the Holy Cross (Croatian: Crkva svetog Križa) is a Croatian Pre-Romanesque Catholic church originating from the 9th century in Nin.

== Description ==
The church is that of a central type, it features the Croatian interlace (or simply "troplet") and a carved name of the župan (count) of Nin "Godečaj", who administered the county of Nin during the time of the Croatian principality. He built the church next to his local seat in the 9th-century.

The church is known under the moniker of "the smallest cathedral in the world." The name comes from the fact that it was once the seat of the bishop of Nin, a historical position which ceased to exist in the 18th century.

According to a theory from an art historian Mladen Pejaković, the design has an intentionally unbalanced elliptical form designated to "follow" the position of the Sun, retaining the functionality of a calendar and sundial.

== Gallery ==
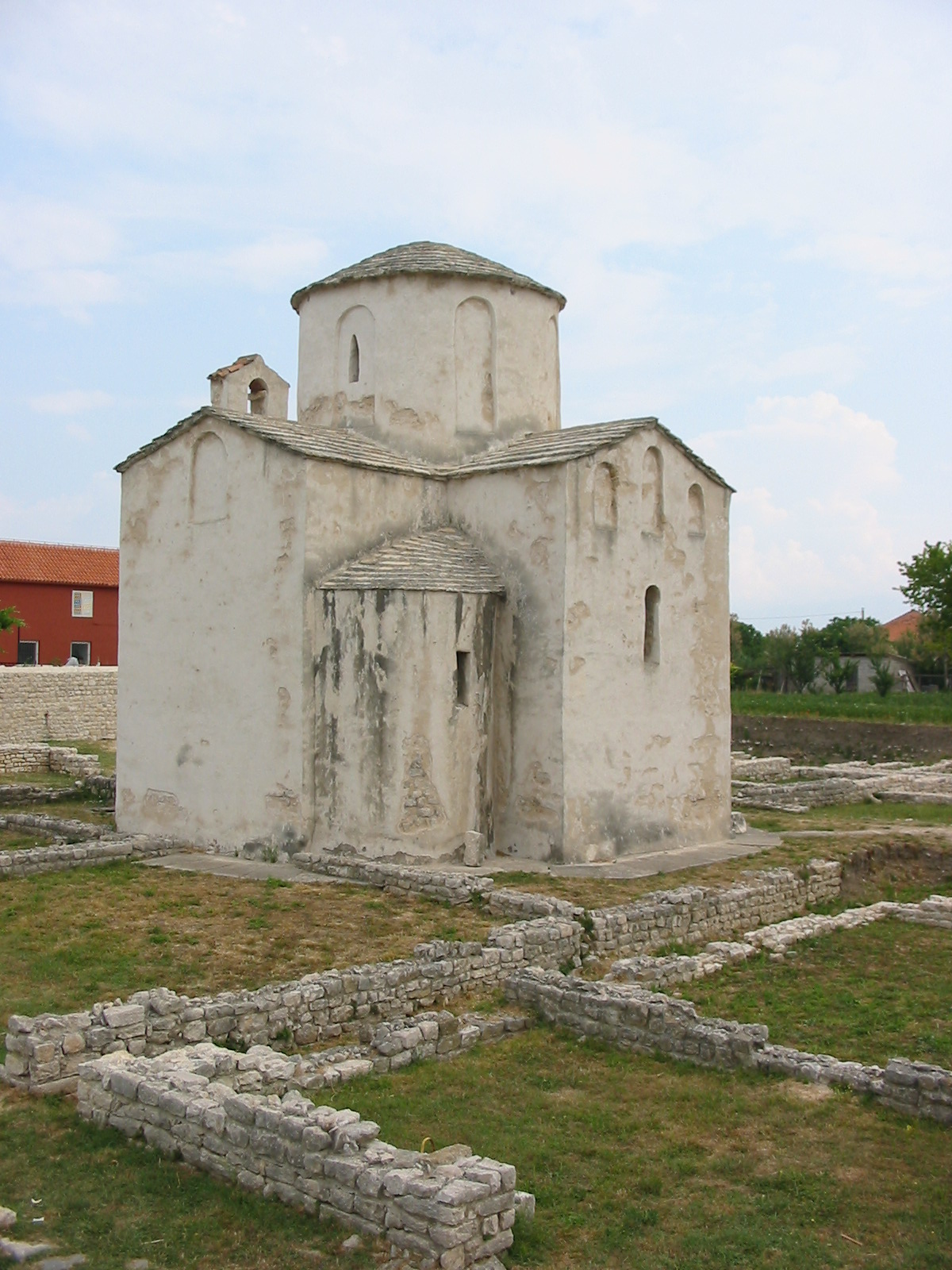
Back view

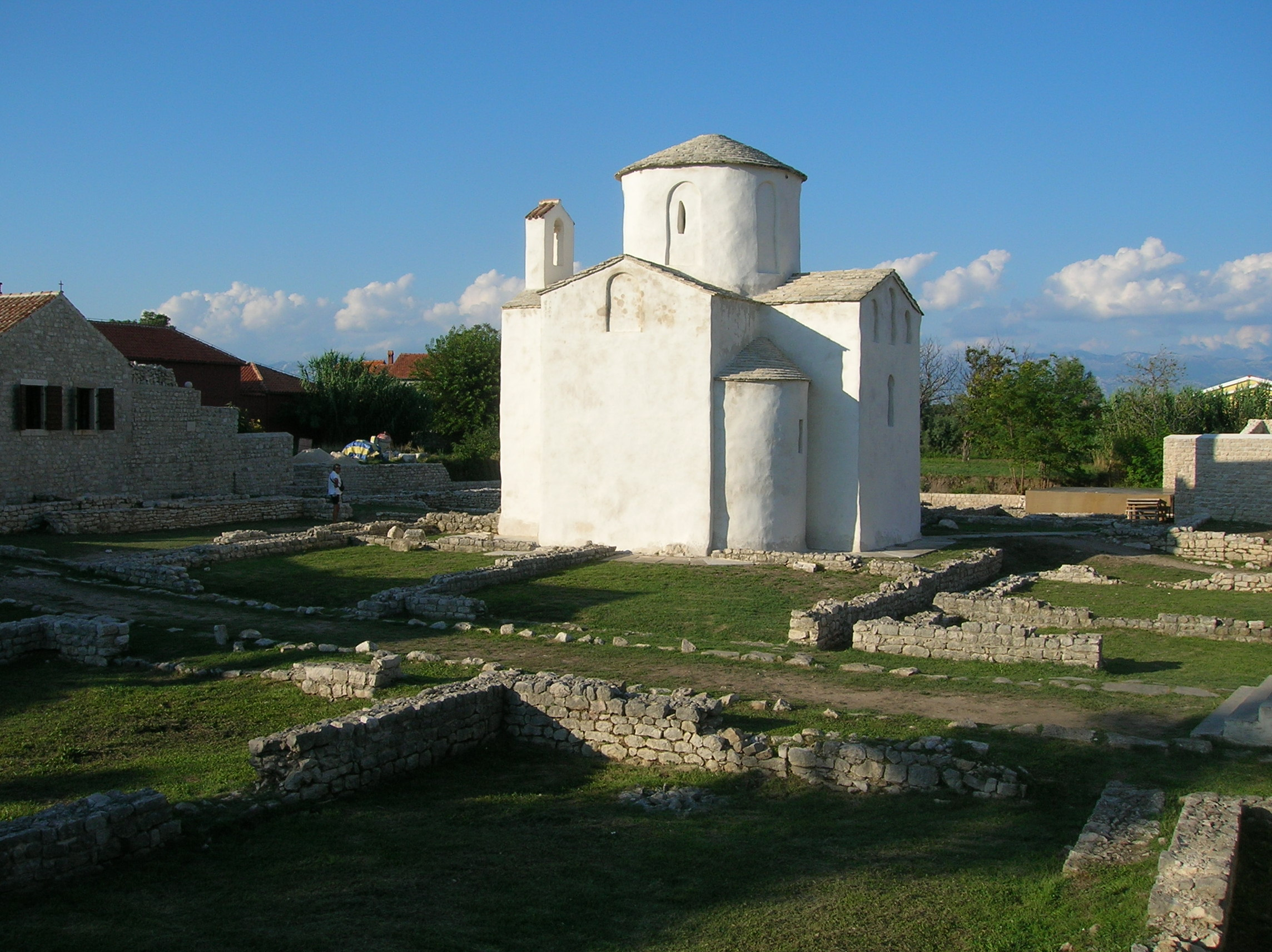
Right view

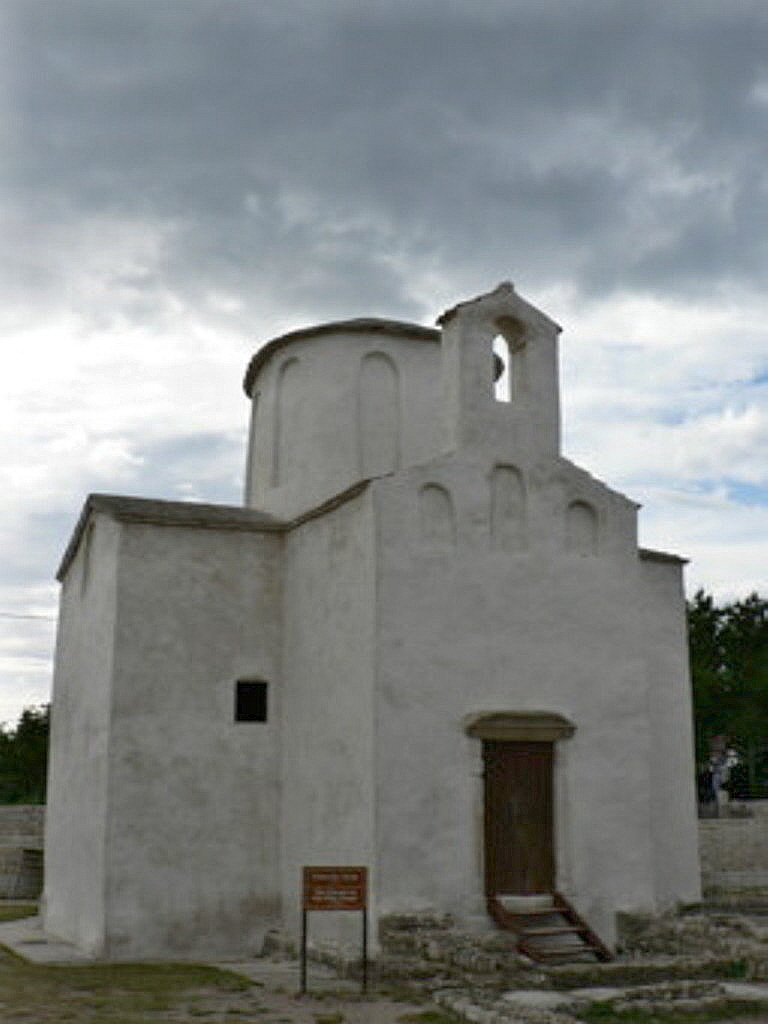
The entrance with an altar fence

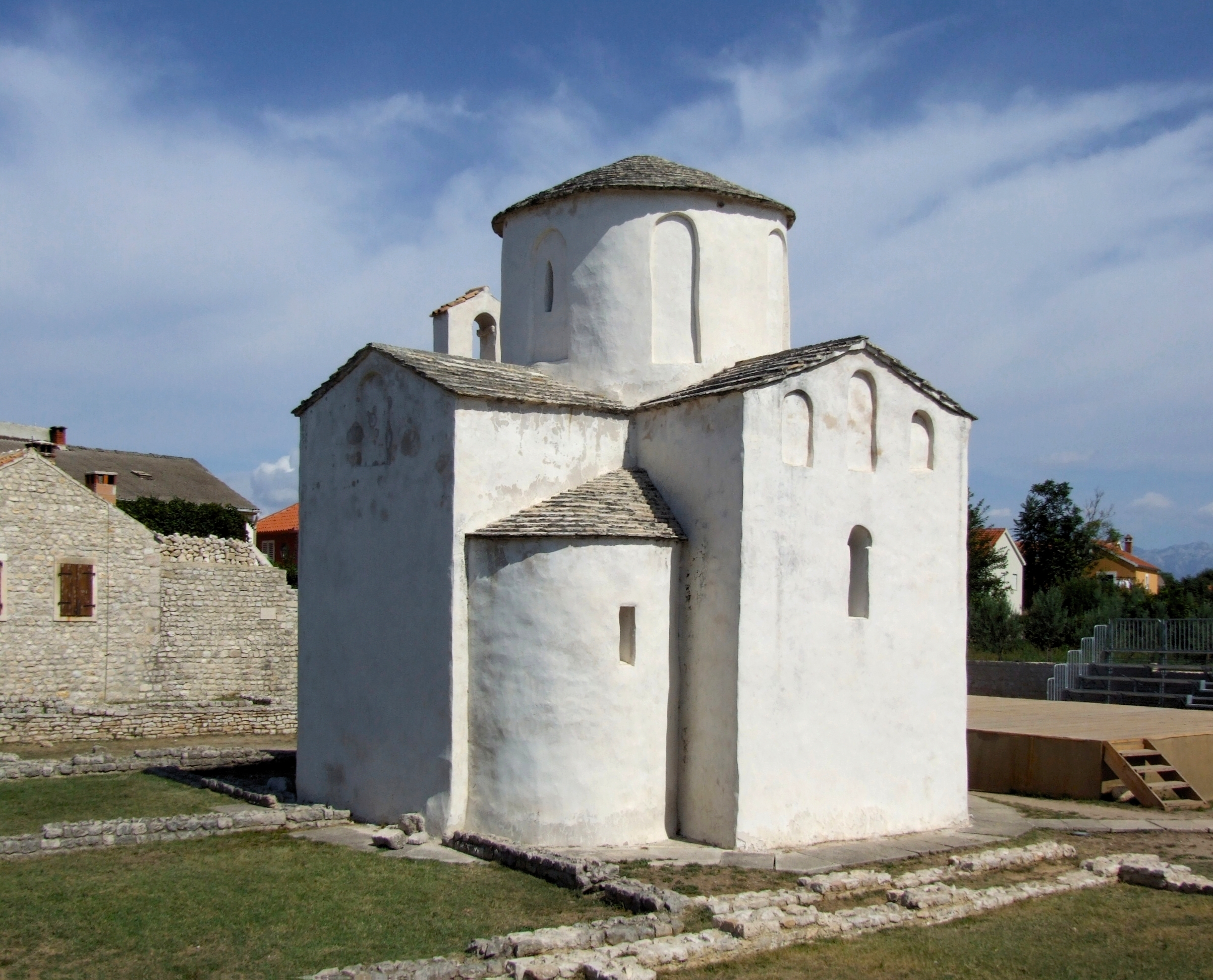

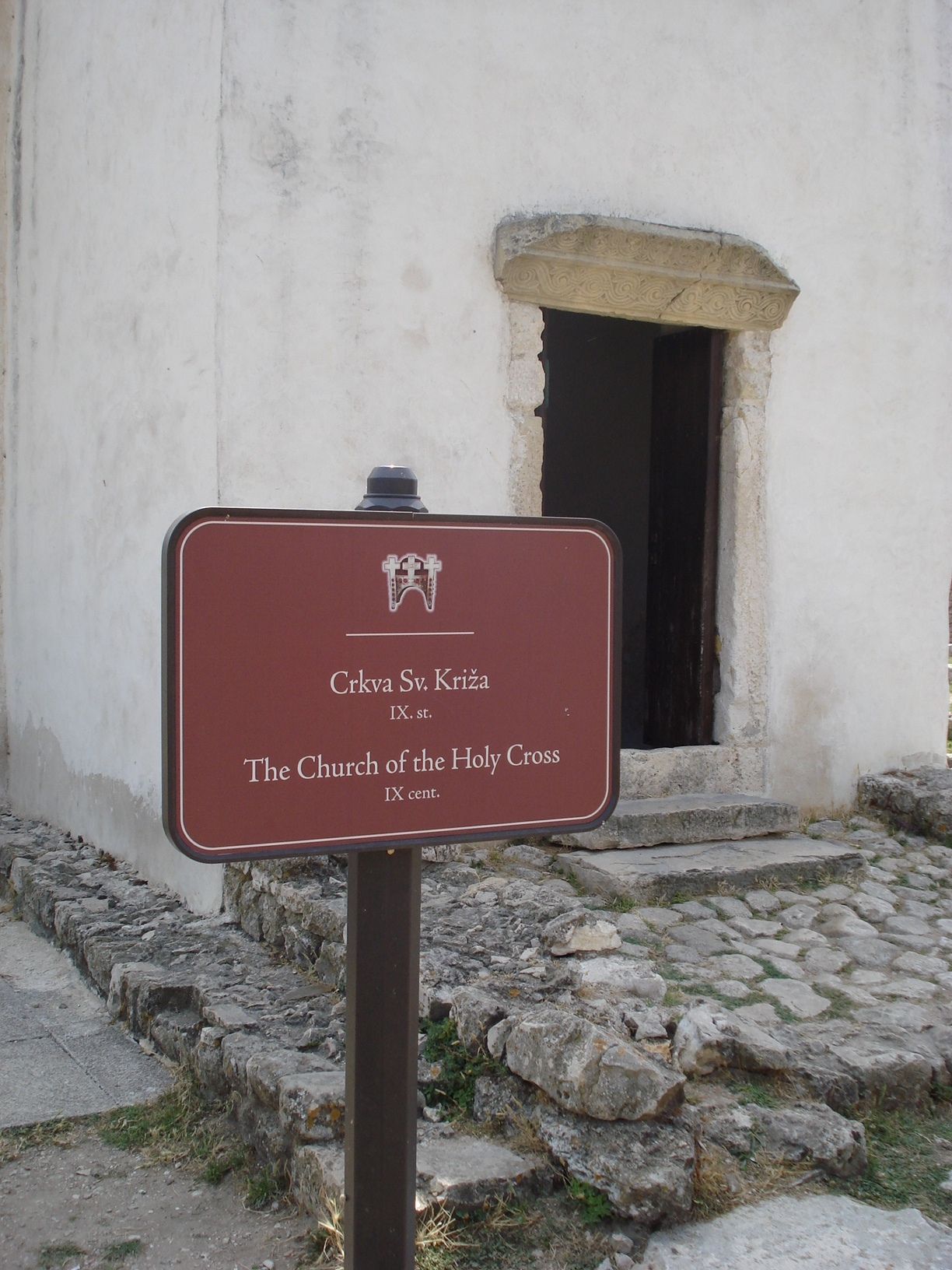
Entrance plaque

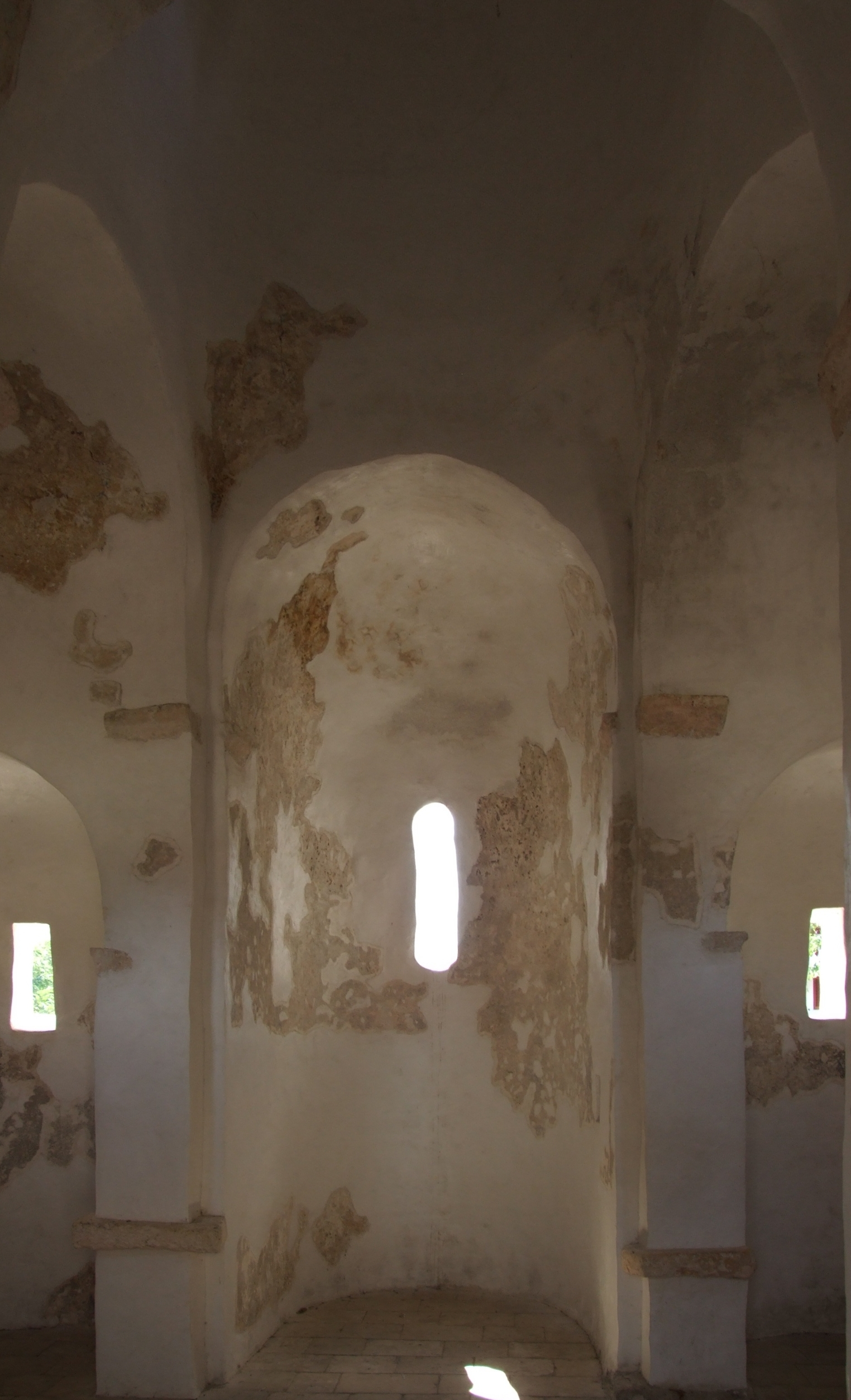
Interior

== See also ==
- Nin, Croatia
- Church of St. Nicholas, Nin
- Architecture of Croatia
- Church of St. Donatus
- Church of Holy Salvation, Cetina
