= Grbe, Croatia =

Settlement in Zadar County, Croatia

Grbe
- Settlement
- Interactive map of Grbe
- Location within Croatia
- Coordinates: 44°14′N 15°13′E
- Country: Croatia
- County: Zadar County
- City: Nin

Area
  - Total: 4.2 km^{2} (1.6 sq mi)

Population (2021)
  - Total: 173
  - Density: 41/km^{2} (110/sq mi)
- Time zone: UTC+1 (CET)
  - Summer (DST): UTC+2 (CEST)
- Postal code: 23232 Nin

Grbe is a settlement in the City of Nin in Croatia. In 2021, its population was 173.

== Demographics ==
Grbe: Population trends 2011–2021
v

population	190	173
	2011	2021

Sources: Croatian Bureau of Statistics publications
