= Poljica-Brig =

Settlement in Zadar County, Croatia

- Settlement
- Interactive map of Poljica-Brig
- Location within Croatia
- Coordinates: 44°13′09″N 15°17′06″E
- Country: Croatia
- County: Zadar County
- City: Nin

Area
  - Total: 6.2 km^{2} (2.4 sq mi)

Population (2021)
  - Total: 304
  - Density: 49/km^{2} (130/sq mi)
- Time zone: UTC+1 (CET)
  - Summer (DST): UTC+2 (CEST)
- Postal code: 23235 Vrsi
- Area code: +385 (0)23

Poljica-Brig is a settlement in the City of Nin in Croatia. In 2021, its population was 304.

== Demographics ==
Poljica-Brig: Population trends 1857–2021
v

| population | 341 | 383 | 395 | 472 | 526 | 618 | 770 | 768 | 1017 | 1065 | 1082 | 1183 | 997 | 1139 | 945 | 276 | 304 |
| | 1857 | 1869 | 1880 | 1890 | 1900 | 1910 | 1921 | 1931 | 1948 | 1953 | 1961 | 1971 | 1981 | 1991 | 2001 | 2011 | 2021 |

Sources: Croatian Bureau of Statistics publications
