= Nin, Croatia =

Nin
- Town
- Grad Nin; Town of Nin
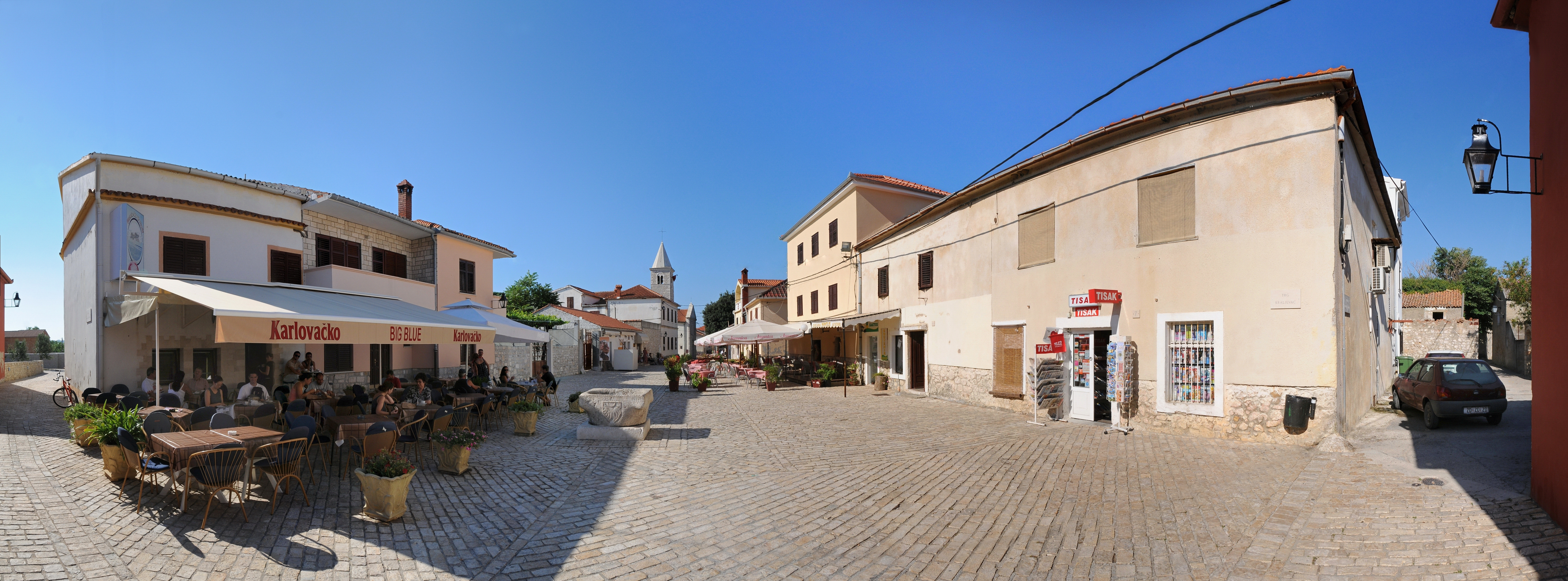
- Nin town center
- Interactive map of Nin
- Location of Nin within Croatia
- Coordinates: 44°14′N 15°10′E
- Country: Croatia
- Region: Dalmatia
- County: Zadar County

Government
  - Mayor: Emil Ćurko (HDZ)
  - Council: 13 members: • HDZ (7); • SDP, HNS, MODES (4); • Independents (2)

Area
  - Town: 53.3 km^{2} (20.6 sq mi)
  - Urban: 8.0 km^{2} (3.1 sq mi)

Population (2021)
  - Town: 2,705
  - Density: 50.8/km^{2} (131/sq mi)
  - Urban: 1,101
  - Urban density: 140/km^{2} (360/sq mi)
- Time zone: UTC+1 (CET)
  - Summer (DST): UTC+2 (CEST)
- Postal code: 23232
- Area code: 023
- Website: grad-nin.hr

Nin (pronounced [nȋːn]; Italian: Nona, Latin: Aenona or Nona) is a town in the Zadar County of Croatia.

Nin was historically important as a centre of a medieval Christian Diocese of Nin. Nin was also the seat of the Princes of Dalmatia.

== Geography ==
Nin's historical center is located on an islet only 500 meters (yards) in diameter. Nin is situated in a lagoon on the eastern shore of the Adriatic Sea, surrounded by natural sandy beaches and linked with the mainland by two stone bridges from the 16th century.

== History ==
According to historians the area of Nin appears to have been settled 10,000 years ago. The present-day town on the islet developed 3,000 years ago and is one of the older towns on the eastern Adriatic. The area of Nin was first colonized by immemorial people of the Mediterranean.

Since the 9th century B.C. the civilization of the Illyrian tribe of Liburnians was present before the Romans came, who had a strong sea and trade center called Aenona (this morphed in the Middle Ages into Nona). The rich archeological finds prove strong sea links with Greece and the Hellenistic world: recent explorations revealed a rarity, a very well preserved Byzantine mosaic on the floor of a Roman villa.

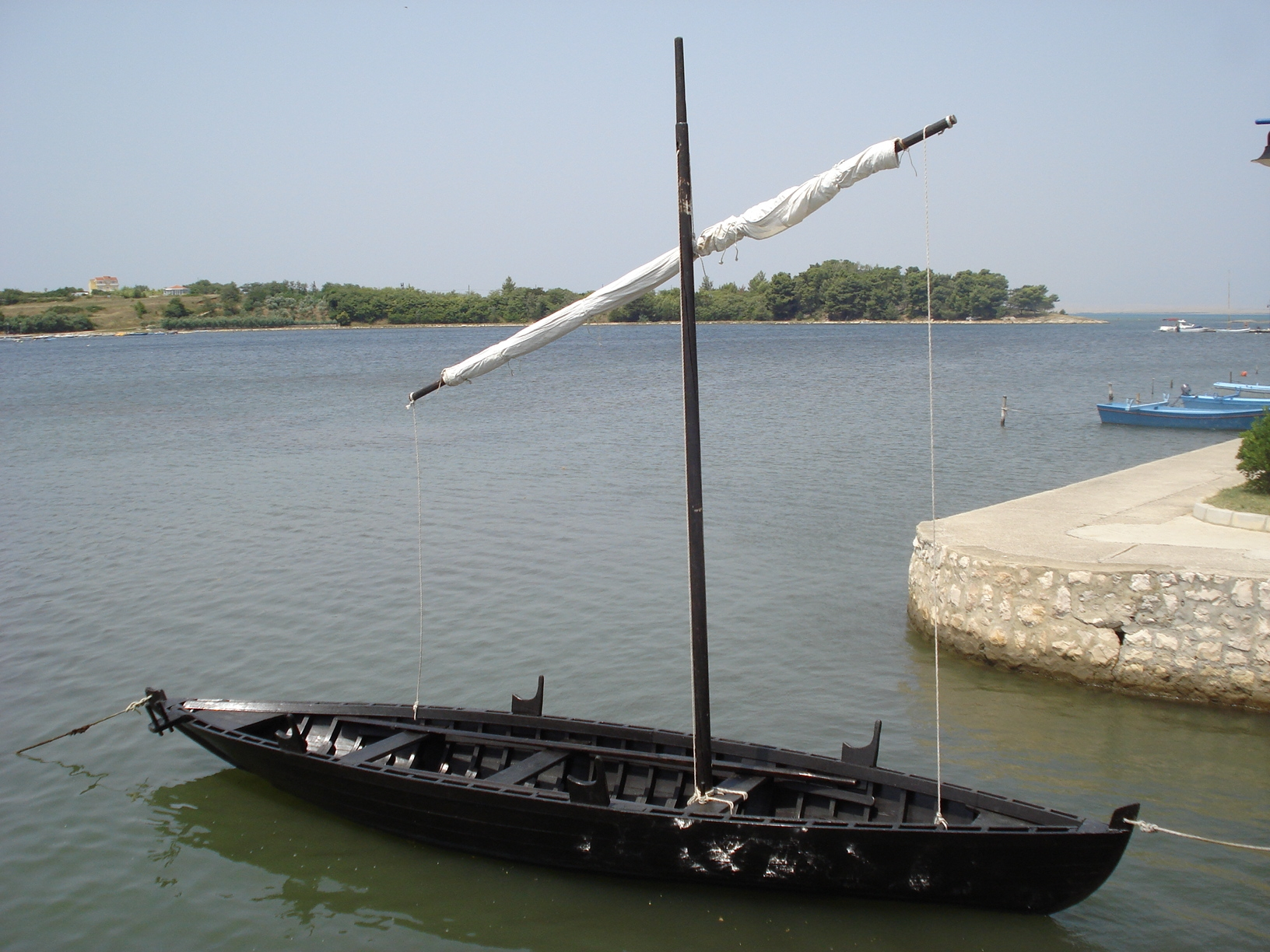
A replica of Condura Croatica – Croatian boat from the 10th century in the Nin lagoon.

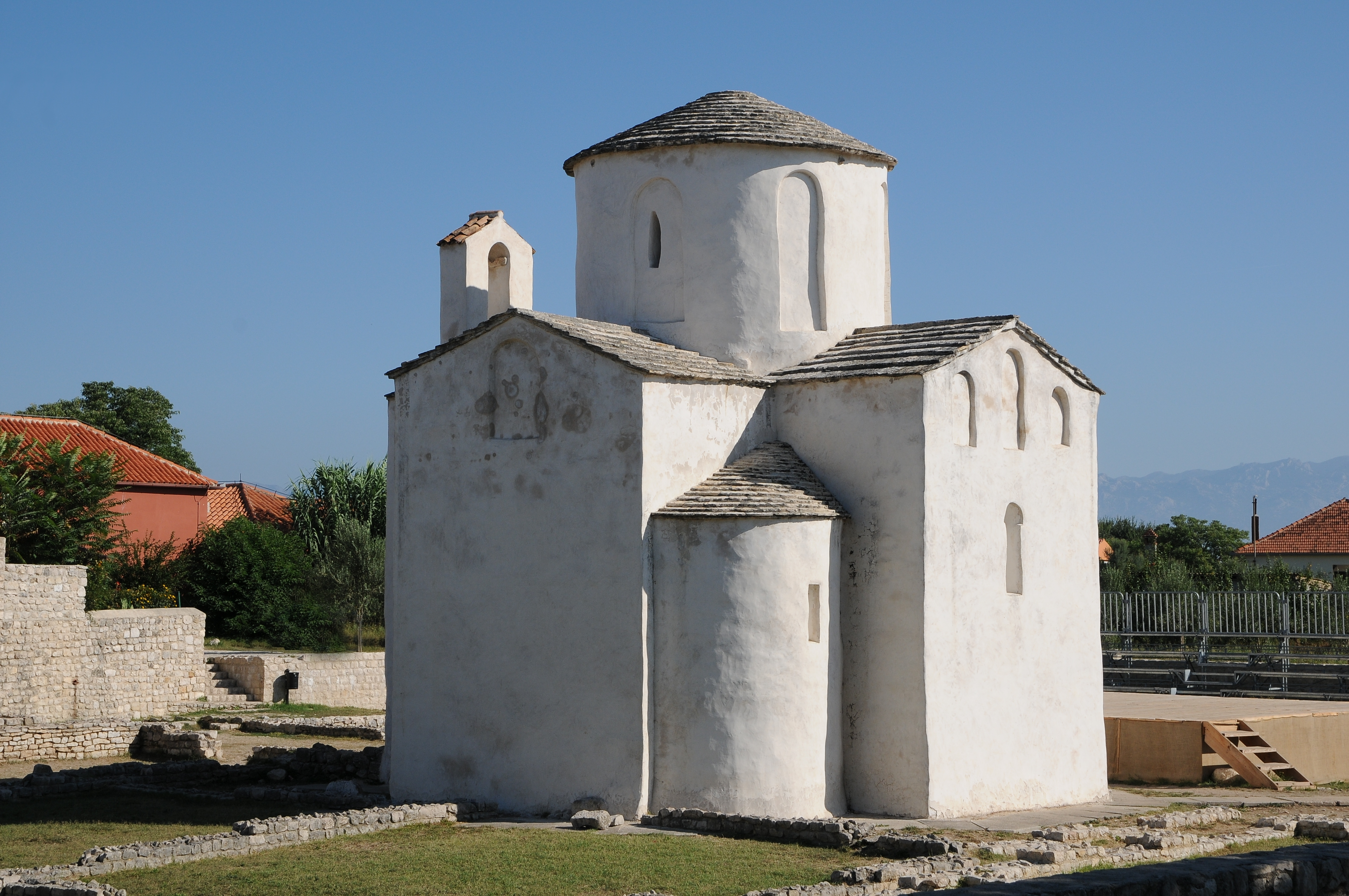
The Church of the Holy Cross in Nin originates from the 9th century.

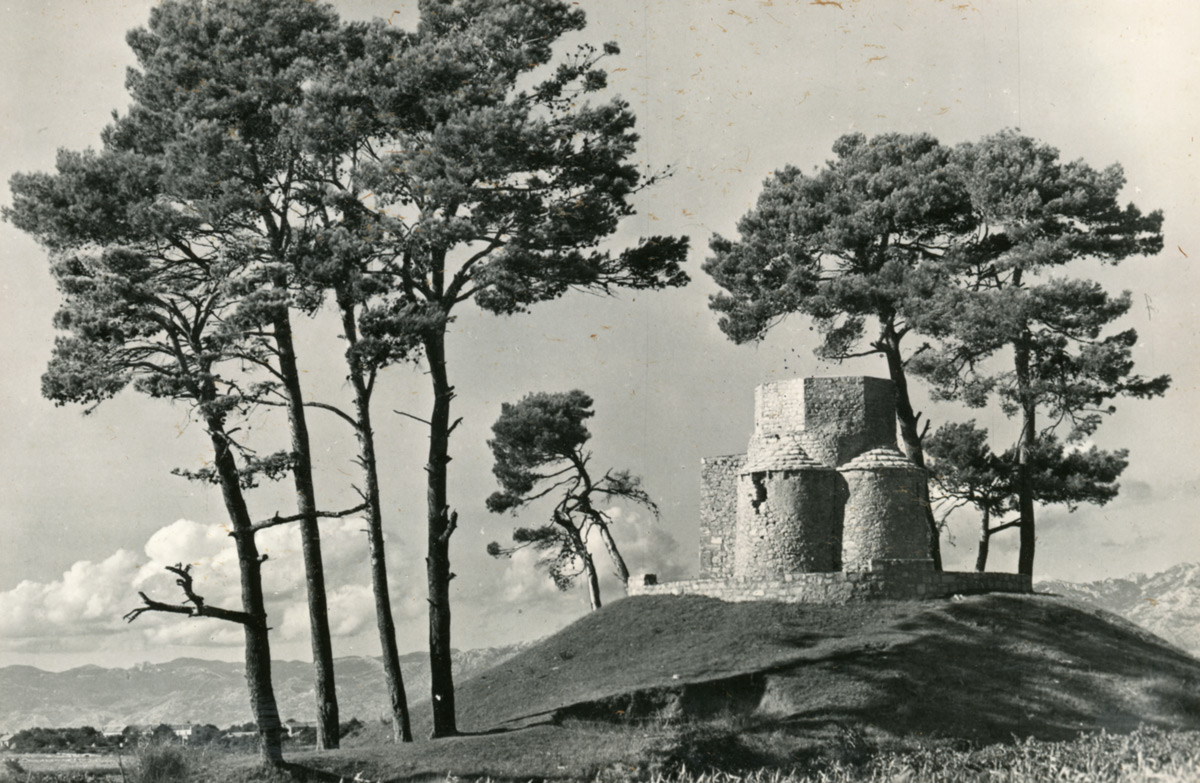
Church of St. Nicholas, Nin

The Croats arrived in Nin in the 8th century. The first Croatian state community was formed in the 9th century. Nin was the first Croatian royal town, with its period of glory being from the 7th to the 13th centuries. In the 9th century Nin became the seat of the first Croatian bishop. Bishops from Nin played a great role in the country's religious, a cultural and a political sense. Significant rulers connected with the history of Nin include Prince Višeslav, Prince Branimir, King Tomislav, King Petar Krešimir IV, King Zvonimir. Up to the abolition and Latinization imposed by King Tomislav in the first half of the 10th century, Nin was the centre of the autonomous Croatian branch of the Church. The Bishop Gregory of Nin (Grgur Ninski) was an important figure in the 10th century ecclesiastical politics of Dalmatia.

At the time of the Turkish wars, Nin found itself on the battlefield. After the selling of Dalmatia to Venice (1409), the city came under the control of the Republic of Venice. The town was economically exploited but not protected militarily. Subsequently, the town was destroyed twice.

The first destruction was in 1571 and the second in 1646. On both occasions, the Venice government gave an order to burn the town and destroy it systematically before abandoning it, so that the Ottomans could not use it as a stronghold. After the 1646 destruction, Nin was never restored to its former condition, and lost its original importance.

The economic development of Nin began after World War II. Since 1969, Nin has been developing as a tourist destination. Nin today is a historical and tourist town which looks for its development in the valorization of its historical heritage. In recent years, many monuments have been restored. Because of the importance of Nin in the history of Croatia, tourists visit from Croatia and elsewhere in Europe. They come especially to visit two symbols of the old town: the church of Holy Cross from the 9th century, called “the smallest cathedral in the world”, and the coronation church.

After 1980 near Nin a high power medium wave broadcasting station was built.

== Population ==
In the 2011 census, there were a total of 2,744 inhabitants in the area of the City of Nin, in the following settlements:

- Grbe, population 190
- Nin, population 1,132
- Ninski Stanovi, population 358
- Poljica-Brig, population 276
- Zaton, population 580
- Žerava, population 208
Town of Nin: Population trends 1857–2021
v

population	1605	1647	1928	1980	2223	2698	3800	3596	4874	5263	5321	5413	4425	6055	4603	2744	2705
	1857	1869	1880	1890	1900	1910	1921	1931	1948	1953	1961	1971	1981	1991	2001	2011	2021

Sources: Croatian Bureau of Statistics publications

== Politics ==
=== Minority councils and representatives ===
Directly elected minority councils and representatives are tasked with consulting tasks for the local or regional authorities in which they are advocating for minority rights and interests, integration into public life and participation in the management of local affairs. At the 2023 Croatian national minorities councils and representatives elections Serbs of Croatia fulfilled legal requirements to elect 15 members minority councils of the Town of Nin but the elections were not organized due to the absence of candidatures.
