= Kondura (ship) =

Type of ship

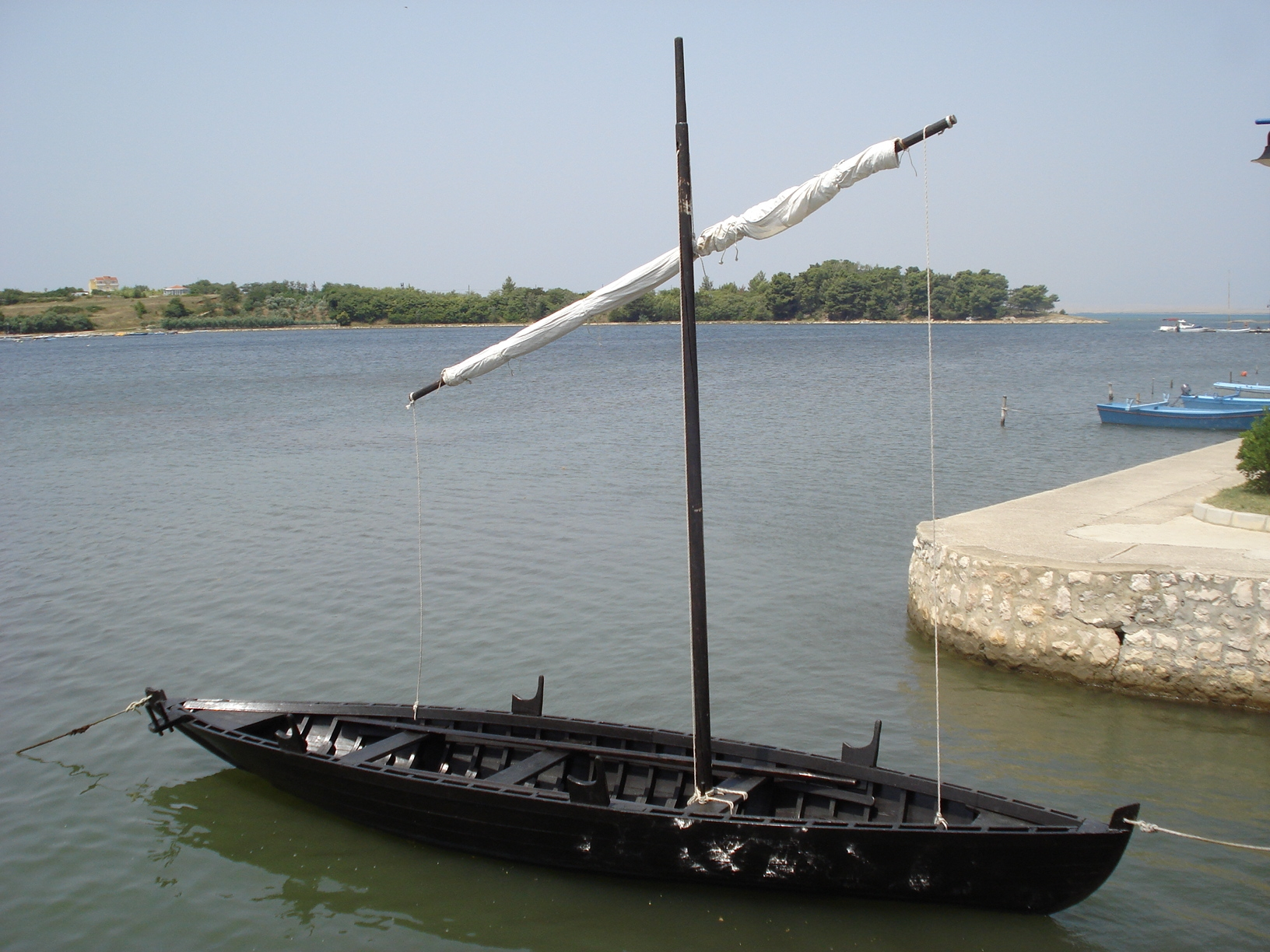
Condura replica

Kondura or Condura (Greek: κονδοῦρα) was a type of ship used on the eastern shores of the Adriatic. It is first mentioned and described in the 10th century as part of the medieval Croatian navy. It is also mentioned in the 14th century as a type of ship used by the Republic of Ragusa. The condura was 7 to 8 metres (23 to 26 ft) long.

== Condura Croatica ==
In 1966, remains of two ships were accidentally found by the port of Nin, which, in 1974, were taken out and transferred to Zadar to restore and conserve the remains. Through radiocarbon dating, it was established that these ships sailed from the end of 11th century to the start of 12th century.

== Etymological similarities with gondola ==
The gondola is the most famous Venetian boat. The etymology of its name is uncertain, it could be a portmanteau word between the verb dondolare (to rock gently) and the Middle Age Greek kondura, short-tailed boat - ancient gondolas, indeed, had a less soaring stern than today's ones - or maybe from Latin cunula, rocking crib.
