= Grbe, Montenegro =

Grbe Грбе
- Village
- Location within Montenegro
- Coordinates: 42.496329°N 19.204819°E
- Country: Montenegro
- Municipality: Danilovgrad

Population (2011)
  - Total: 1,730
- Time zone: UTC+1 (CET)
  - Summer (DST): UTC+2 (CEST)

Grbe (Montenegrin: Грбе) is a village in the municipality of Danilovgrad, Montenegro. It is located along the road from Podgorica to Danilovgrad.

== Demographics ==
According to the 2011 census, its population was 1,730.

Ethnicity in 2011
Ethnicity	Number	Percentage
Montenegrins	978	56.5%
Serbs	462	26.7%
Albanians	54	3.1%
Bosniaks	14	0.8%
Macedonians	7	0.4%
Roma	17	1.0%
other/undeclared	198	11.4%
Total	1,730	100%
